= Sachi Matsumoto =

Japanese voice actress (born 1973)

- 松本 さち
- Born: March 29, 1973 (age 53); Kyoto Prefecture, Japan
- Occupation: Voice actress
- Years active: 1990–present
- Agent: Kenyu Office
- Website: sachiouji.daa.jp

Sachi Matsumoto (松本 さち, Matsumoto Sachi; born March 29, 1973) is a Japanese voice actress. She began acting in 1990, and has been affiliated with Kenyu Office as of April 1, 2006, after leaving Arts Vision.

She has notably voiced Link and Aryll in The Legend of Zelda: The Wind Waker, Link in The Legend of Zelda: Four Swords Adventures and The Legend of Zelda: Phantom Hourglass, and Toon Link in Super Smash Bros. Brawl, Super Smash Bros. for Nintendo 3DS and Wii U, Hyrule Warriors and Super Smash Bros. Ultimate. In anime, she has provided the voice of characters such as Naoto Yamada in A Penguin's Troubles, Sewashi in Doraemon, and Takashi Horimachi in Taro the Space Alien, She also voiced Haruka Kyoda in The Daichis, Hasumodai in Fantastic Children, Pike in Princess Tutu, and Yuuhi Shinatsuhiko in Yozakura Quartet.

== Biography ==
Although she had been shy since she was a child, she loved to express herself during nursery school recitals and elementary school plays. She learned how fun reading aloud could be when her teacher praised her reading of "Faithful Elephants" in third grade.

She had a vague desire to pursue a career in performing arts, such as theater. Around the same time, she also took piano lessons, wanted to become a manga artist, and loved singing, so aimed to become a singer too. After seeing Castle in the Sky in theaters during her junior high school days, she learnt from the promotional pamphlet that Mayumi Tanaka, who voiced the protagonist Pazu, had also voiced Kappei Sakamoto, the main protagonist of Dash Kappei, which inspired her to pursue a career as a voice actress, singer, and performer.

She graduated from the Kyoto Prefectural Rakusui High School and the Japan Narration Acting Institute.

She transferred from Arts Vision to Kenyu Office.

== Filmography ==
=== Anime ===
List of voice performances in anime
Year	Title	Role	Notes	Source
1996	Those Who Hunt Elves	Elf		
1996	Kiko-chan's Smile	Mori 守		
1998	Marvelous Melmo	Totoo	Renewal version	
1998	Sorcerous Stabber Orphen	Boy		
1998	Saber Marionette J to X	Mitsuhiko		
1999	Gokudo	Momotaro		
1999	Orphen Revenge	Woman		
1999	Jibaku-kun	Tama		
1999	The Big O	Forensics		
2000	Inspector Fabre ja:ファーブル先生は名探偵	Brunco, Claude		
2000	Taro the Space Alien	Takashi Horimachi		
2001	Shingu: Secret of the Stellar Wars	Hikaru Inagaki		
2001	Trotting Hamtaro	Roberto Arvelo		
2001	Crush Gear Turbo	Takanami Yamaburo, Saubor Furuyama 多古山太郎 / 多古山三郎		
2002	Beyblade V-Force	Jusuf		
2002	Cheeky Angel	Tomo		
2002	Denkō Chō Tokkyū Hikarian – Lightning Attack Express	Lightning West		
2002	Princess Tutu	Pike		
2002	Mobile Suit Gundam SEED	Asagi Caldwell		
2003	Zentrix	Marf マーフ		
2003	Astro Boy	Ken	Ep. 6	
2003	D.C. Da Capo	Rich lady	Ep. 16	
2003	Rumic Theater	Nakagawa, Kenta Hirooka		
2003	Mermaid Saga	Child		
2003	Galaxy Railways	To~uriru		
2004	Soreike! Zukkoke Sanningumi	Shotaro "Hakase" Yamanaka		
2004	Burst Angel	Charlie		
2004	Fantastic Children	Hasmodye		
2004	Major	Esaka 江角	1st series	
2005–06	Fushigiboshi no Futagohime series	Solo ソロ	Also Gyu!	
2005	Doraemon	Sewashi		
2006	Crash B-Daman	Young Jubee Sanada		
2006	Baked Goods, Sweet Tree	Jiro 次郎		
2007	Deltora Quest	Young Jard ジャード（少年時代）		
2007	Hayate the Combat Butler	Baseball Boy 野球少年		
2007	Claymore	Claymore		
2007	Love Com	Elementary school student 小学生		
2007	Hero Tales	Lien		
2008–11	Penguin no Mondai series	Naoto Yamada		
2008–13	Yozakura Quartet series	Yūhi Shinatsuhiko	2 seasons and specials	
2009	Sōten Kōro	Liú Jì		
2009	Nyan Koi!	Komatsa コマサ		
2009	Aoi Bungaku	Philostratos フィロストラトス		
2013	Chihayafuru 2	Yukimasa Osaka 逢坂恵夢		
2017	Blue Exorcist	Nishiki Hōjō		
2019	Shimajirō no Wow!	Mugitarō		
2022	Deaimon	Miyu's mother	Ep. 7	
2025	Tougen Anki	Demon Child, Mei's mother	Demon Child in Ep. 5, Mei's mother in Eps. 6-7, 10	

=== Film ===
List of voice performances in film
Year	Title	Role	Notes	Source
2002	The Day When I Was Born	Nurse		
2003	Pa-Pa-Pa the Movie: Perman	Girl		
2003	Detective Conan: Crossroad in the Ancient Capital	Kendo Boy		
2004	Doraemon: Nobita in the Wan-Nyan Spacetime Odyssey	Mii-chan		
2007	Doraemon: Nobita's New Great Adventure into the Underworld ~The 7 Magic Users~	Sewashi		
2009	Penguin no Mondai: Shiawase no Aoi Tori de Go-Pen-nasai	Naoto Yamada		
2013	Doraemon: Nobita's Secret Gadget Museum	Sewashi		
2014	Stand by Me Doraemon	Sewashi		

=== Video games ===
List of voice performances in video games
Year	Title	Role	Notes	Source
1998	Let's go for a tour party graduation trip ツアーパーティー 卒業旅行にいこう	Akiko Akitsuki	PS2, Sega Saturn	
1998	Yuwaku Office Ren'ai Ka ja:ゆうわくオフィス恋愛課	Akiko Akitsuki 秋月杏子	PlayStation	
1998	Zeus Carnage Heart Second	Reina Sakimoto レイナ・サキモト	PS1 / PS2	
2000	The Legend of Zelda: Majora's Mask	Skull Kid		
2001	Zone of the Enders	Boy, Reporter	PS1 / PS2	
2002	Crush Gear Turbo	Takanomiyama Taro 多古山太郎	PS1 / PS2	
2002	Star Mahoroba 星のまほろば	Mikaboshi ミカボシ	PS1 / PS2	
2002	The Legend of Zelda: The Wind Waker	Link, Aryll		
2003	The Legend of Zelda: A Link to the Past and Four Swords	Link		
2004	Doraemon: Nobita in the Wan-Nyan Spacetime Odyssey	Mi-chan		
2004	The Legend of Zelda: Four Swords Adventures	Link, Shadow Link		
2004	The Legend of Zelda: The Minish Cap	Link		
2005	Toppo Nerae! Gunbuster	Linda Yamamoto	PS2	
2007	The Legend of Zelda: Phantom Hourglass	Link	DS	
2008	Super Smash Bros. Brawl	Toon Link	Wii	
2009	Muramasa: The Demon Blade	Kazekami 風神	Wii	
2010	CLOCK ZERO ~ One second of demise ~ ja:CLOCK ZERO 〜終焉の一秒〜	Rook	PS2, also ExTime in 2015	
2014	Hyrule Warriors	Toon Link, Skull Kid		
2014	Super Smash Bros. for Nintendo 3DS and Wii U	Toon Link, Skull Kid	3DS, Wii U	
2015	Atelier Sophie: The Alchemist of the Mysterious Book	Makelet	PS3, other	
2016	Atelier Firis: The Alchemist and the Mysterious Journey	Makelet		
2018	Super Smash Bros. Ultimate	Toon Link, Skull Kid		
2020	Mobile Legends: Bang Bang	Hilda, Nana, Floryn	Android, iOS	

=== Tokusatsu ===
List of voice performances in tokusatsu
Year	Title	Role	Notes	Source
2004	Tokusou Sentai Dekaranger	Barisien Attika Alpachi Jr.	Ep. 24	
2005	Mahou Sentai Magiranger	Hades Beastman Peewee the Harpy	Ep. 26	
