= The Legend of Zelda: Tri Force Heroes =

2015 video game

- Developers: Nintendo EPD; Grezzo (Note: Development Cooperation by 1-UP Studio)
- Publisher: Nintendo
- Director: Hiromasa Shikata
- Producer: Eiji Aonuma
- Designer: Yoichi Yamada
- Programmer: Shiro Mouri
- Artist: Keisuke Umeda
- Composer: Ryō Nagamatsu
- Series: The Legend of Zelda
- Platform: Nintendo 3DS
- Release: JP: October 22, 2015; NA/EU: October 23, 2015; AU: October 24, 2015
- Genre: Action-adventure
- Modes: Single-player, multiplayer

The Legend of Zelda: Tri Force Heroes (Note: Japanese: ゼルダの伝説 トライフォース3銃士, Hepburn: Zeruda no Densetsu: Toraifōsu San-jūshi; lit. "The Legend of Zelda: The Three Triforce Musketeers") is a 2015 action-adventure game developed by Nintendo EPD and Grezzo and published by Nintendo for the Nintendo 3DS. The second original Nintendo 3DS entry in The Legend of Zelda series after A Link Between Worlds, this game is the third installment in the franchise to prominently feature a multiplayer campaign after Four Swords and Four Swords Adventures, albeit this time with only three players as opposed to four and a stronger emphasis on cooperation rather than competition.

The story follows the same incarnation of Link from the aforementioned A Link Between Worlds, who this time is called forth along with two other Links by the fashion-obsessed kingdom of Hytopia to lift a curse placed on their princess, Styla, from the evil Drablands Witch.

Tri Force Heroes was released worldwide in October 2015 and received generally mixed reviews from critics. While the game's presentation, soundtrack and multiplayer were praised, many reviewers criticized the game's single-player mode and its online functionality and matchmaking features. The game sold over 1.36 million copies worldwide.

== Gameplay ==
The top screen shows the three colored Links forming a totem pole in order to bomb a cracked box. The bottom screen's interface allows the player to communicate with others.

The Legend of Zelda: Tri Force Heroes is a cooperative action-adventure game in which three players control differently colored versions of series protagonist Link and join forces to fight enemies and solve puzzles. Similar to previous multiplayer Zelda titles, such as Four Swords Adventures, players must work together, using the items they receive at the start of each level to help each other progress. One of the key puzzle-solving techniques is stacking the three player characters in a totem pole, allowing the top player to reach higher elevations, attack enemies, be thrown across gaps, and perform other actions. Another game mechanic involves collecting items in order to craft outfits that grant the characters various abilities. Players share a heart meter, with all players losing one of their life fairies should the meter run out.

A particular mechanic of the game is the costumes; these costumes grant special and hidden abilities, such as upgrading an item's ability, health capacity, or stamina limit.

The game supports both local and online multiplayer gameplay, wherein players use icons on the touch screen to communicate with each other, as well as a competitive Coliseum mode. A single player can also play the game by controlling doll-like companions called "Doppels" in place of additional players, though the main mode does not support two players without a third. Tri Force Heroes features a visual style mixing A Link Between Worlds's and The Wind Waker's.

=== Downloadable content ===
Nintendo released free downloadable content (DLC) for Tri Force Heroes, which introduced a new dungeon called "The Den of Trials" and two additional costumes. "The Den of Trials" contained a greater number of stages than the original dungeons and players must defeat all enemies in each of its stages in order to progress. The update was released on December 2, 2015.

== Plot and setting ==
Tri Force Heroes is set several years after A Link Between Worlds and centers on Link, who was originally planned on appearing with the same design as the main protagonist of A Link Between Worlds. This was ultimately replaced with the "Toon Link" design in the final version, as the developers felt it made the models easier to see on the smaller screens of the 3DS. However the Tri Force Heroes main protagonist and the A Link Between Worlds main protagonist are still the same Link. In the series' official timeline, Tri Force Heroes takes place in the "Defeated Hero" timeline that results from the Hero of Time's potential failure in Ocarina of Time, leading to the events of A Link to the Past. It is the fifth title on this timeline branch (the Oracle of Seasons and Oracle of Ages as a joint title), taking place between A Link Between Worlds and Echoes of Wisdom. It is the eighteenth title in The Legend of Zelda chronology.

Tri Force Heroes begins as Link arrives in the kingdom of Hytopia in the middle of a crisis surrounding its fashion obsession; its princess Styla has been cursed by "The Lady" to wear a brown jumpsuit. Her father, King Tuft, sends out a call for a hero to save the princess depending on a prophecy's characteristics. Link, fitting perfectly, is sent with two teammates across the Drablands, where they travel to The Lady's lair and defeat her, lifting Styla's curse. Link is then celebrated by Hytopia for his actions.

== Development ==
The Legend of Zelda: Tri Force Heroes is similar to Marvelous: Mōhitotsu no Takarajima, and is considered a spiritual successor. The inspiration for Tri Force Heroes originated in 2009 from a portion of The Legend of Zelda: Spirit Tracks in which Princess Zelda is able to possess phantoms. Tri Force Heroes director Hiromasa Shikata, who had also worked on Spirit Tracks, explained: "That element [the ability to control phantoms] really intrigued me and brought out the idea that I wanted to try multiplayer as well". Shikata's interest in working on a multiplayer Zelda game "was sort of revitalized and came out of hibernation" during the development of A Link Between Worlds. The game was originally going to not include a single player option, as Shikata believed the game should be kept multiplayer only, but series producer Eiji Aonuma personally requested it. Shikata later admitted that not including a single player option would have been a huge mistake.

Regarding Link's ability to don a dress typically worn by Zelda in other installments in the series, Shikata said they consulted with folks in the U.S. and in Japan, and asked 'Do we think we're going [to get] too much of a negative reaction by having Link wear a dress?'" The development team arrived at the conclusion that having a cross-dressing Link would not be an issue. Shikata expressed the team's hope that having the dress and similar outfits in the game would widen its appeal to young female gamers.

== Reception ==
Reception

Aggregate scores
Aggregator	Score
Metacritic	73/100
OpenCritic	35% recommend

Review scores
Publication	Score
Destructoid	7/10
Electronic Gaming Monthly	6/10
Game Informer	7.25/10
GameRevolution	3/5
GameSpot	5/10
GamesRadar+	3.5/5
GameTrailers	6.5/10
IGN	8.5/10
Nintendo Life	6/10
VideoGamer.com	7/10

Tri Force Heroes received "mixed or average" reviews, according to review aggregator website Metacritic. Fellow review aggregator OpenCritic assessed that the game received fair approval, being recommended by 35% of critics. At its showing at E3 2015, it won the Game Critics Awards Best Handheld/Mobile Game and IGN's Best 3DS Game awards. While the game's presentation, soundtrack and multiplayer gameplay were praised, many reviewers criticized its single-player mode and lack of a two player option. Many reviewers also criticized the game's online functionality and matchmaking features. The game has sold over 1.36 million copies worldwide as of December 2020.
