= Four Swords =

Four Swords can refer to one of a number of video games in Nintendo's The Legend of Zelda series.

- A Multi-player addition to the Game Boy Advance port The Legend of Zelda: A Link to the Past and Four Swords in 2002 and later released as a standalone title for the DSiware service in 2011 as The Legend of Zelda: Four Swords Anniversary Edition
- The Legend of Zelda: Four Swords Adventures (2004), for the Nintendo GameCube
