= Marvelous: Mōhitotsu no Takarajima =

1996 video game

- Developer: Nintendo R&D2
- Publisher: Nintendo
- Director: Eiji Aonuma
- Producer: Masayuki Uemura
- Programmer: Yasunari Soejima
- Composer: Yuichi Ozaki
- Platform: Super Famicom
- Release: JP: October 26, 1996
- Genres: Adventure, RPG
- Mode: Single-player

Marvelous: Mōhitotsu no Takarajima (マーヴェラス ～もうひとつの宝島～; lit. "Marvelous: Another Treasure Island") is a 1996 video game developed and published by Nintendo for the Super Famicom. It is the first title directed by Eiji Aonuma.

Two special versions of the game, BS Marvelous: Time Athletic (BSマーヴェラス タイムアスレチック, BS Māvuerasu Taimu Asurechikku) and BS Marvelous: Camp Arnold (BSマーヴェラス キャンプアーノルド, BS Māvuerasu Kyanpu Anorudo) were released for the Satellaview.

== Gameplay ==
Dion, Max and Jack lifting a pot in order to unblock the path forward

The game was influenced by The Legend of Zelda: A Link to the Past. It is controlled from a top-down viewpoint, and a cursor can be used to search objects on screen.

The player controls the three boys, with one leading while the other two follow. A command window will pop up when the player encounters an object or person, and will give them choices on what to do, such as picking up objects, talking, or reading.

The BS Marvelous games are based on stamp collecting. Stamps are obtained from non-player characters in the gameworld, but must be retrieved in a specific order. Clues to the location of the next stamp are given in-game and via SoundLink voice. The goal is to collect as many stamps as possible in the time available; players could compete against each other by sending in their scores to win prizes.

== Plot ==
Long ago, the seas were ruled by treasure-seeking pirates, the most famous being the legendary Captain Maverick, who supposedly left behind a great treasure known as "Marvelous", guarded by unsolvable puzzles and bizarre creatures. Countless adventurers have gone looking for "Marvelous", but none have seen it and returned alive. Many years later, a group of twelve-year-old children, consisting of Dion, Max, and Jack, are on a field trip and land on the island, which is rumored to be the location of "Marvelous".

=== Main characters ===
Dion (ディオン) (in red and brown) – He is short but spirited, and is a fast runner and good pitcher. His small size allows him to access places that the other two cannot fit into. Putting him at the head of the team will make them walk faster.

Max (マックス, Makkusu) (in green) – He is the largest and strongest of the three, and is good at boxing and can lift heavy objects. He likes to eat, but also likes to play soccer and swim.

Jack (ジャック, Jakku) (in blue and red, wears glasses) – He is the smartest of the three, and likes to build and work with machines. He is a good jumper and is taller than the others, which allows him to access areas the other two cannot.

Ms. Gina (ジーナ先生, Jīna sensei) – She is the teacher of the three boys, who gives them a Leader Hat, which signifies the group's leader, and the Whistle, which allows the leader to call and bring the other two back to him.

== Development ==
Marvelous was the first game directed by Eiji Aonuma. Aonuma wanted to work on a Zelda game since playing The Legend of Zelda: A Link to the Past, and made Marvelous as close to Zelda as he could. The game uses the engine from The Legend of Zelda: A Link to the Past.

In a move which Aonuma attributes to his position on the Marvelous team, Miyamoto recruited him to join the development team for the Zelda series. Aonuma then worked on The Legend of Zelda: Ocarina of Time.

== Release ==
Marvelous: Another Treasure Island was released on October 26, 1996, for the Super Famicom, exclusively in Japan. A reason for this was that the game was released late into the Super Famicom's lifespan, when Nintendo was not investing into language localizations for the system outside of Japan. At this time, Nintendo wanted to focus instead on the newly released Nintendo 64. The poor sales of Earthbound is cited as another reason.

BS Marvelous: Time Athletic was considered for re-release in 2003 as a stand-alone game, which became The Legend of Zelda spinoff title Tetra's Trackers. Although Tetra's Trackers was ultimately cancelled, the game's code was included in The Legend of Zelda: Four Swords+, the Japanese version of The Legend of Zelda: Four Swords Adventures, as the Navi Trackers minigame. Among the oxbow code remaining in The Legend of Zelda: Four Swords+ is 3D character models for the original camp instructor from the BS Marvelous games as well as maps from BS Marvelous: Time Athletic.

Marvelous: Mōhitotsu no Takarajima was released on the Japanese Virtual Console for the Wii U on February 12, 2014. In 2016, an English language fan translation of the game was released.

== Legacy ==
In 2014, IGN placed the game as 118 on their list of 125 top Nintendo developed games of all time.

The Nintendo 3DS title The Legend of Zelda: Tri Force Heroes is considered to be a spiritual successor to Marvelous: Another Treasure Island.

Dion, Max, and Jack appear as a singular unlockable "Spirit" in Super Smash Bros. Ultimate.
