= Eiji Aonuma =

Japanese video game designer and producer (born 1963)

- 青沼 英二
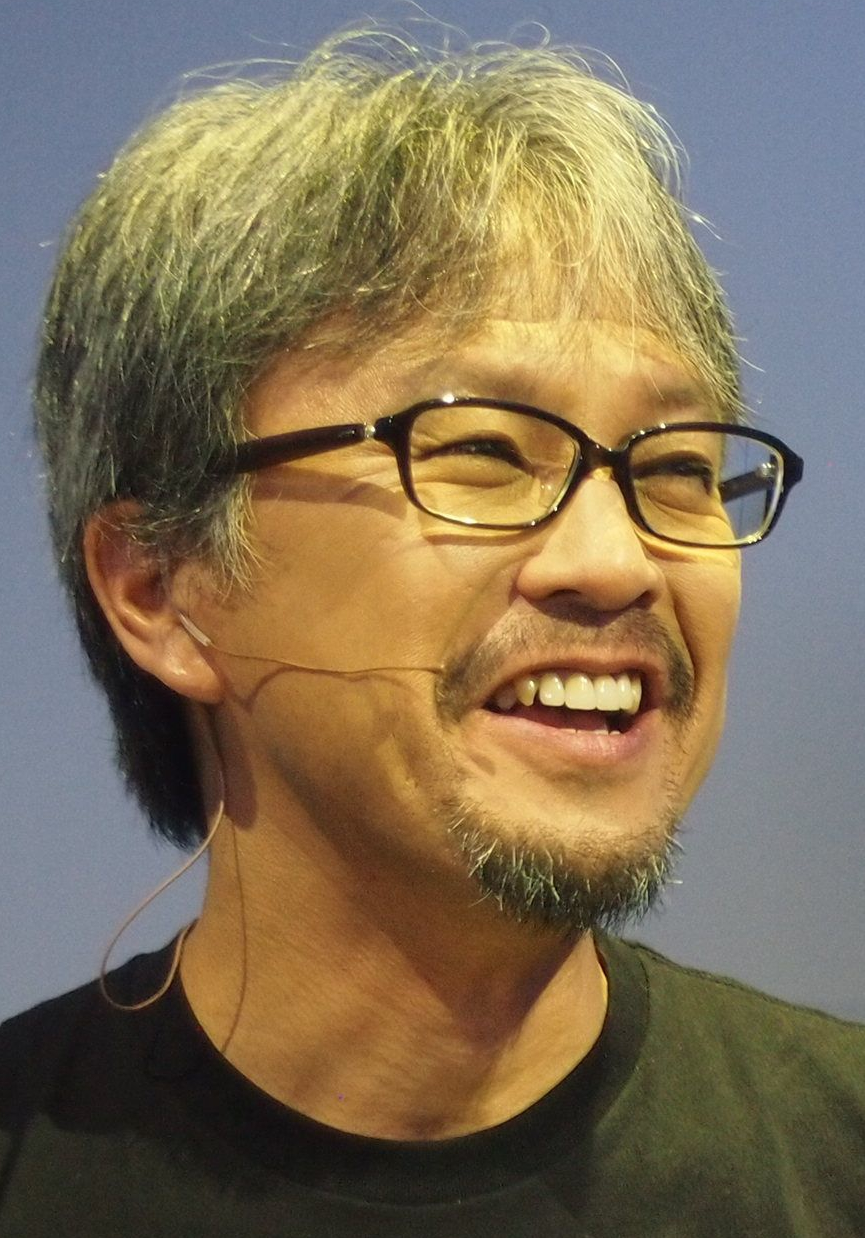
- Aonuma in 2013
- Born: Eiji Onozuka (小野塚 英二); March 16, 1963 (age 63); Nagano Prefecture, Japan
- Education: Tokyo University of the Arts
- Occupations: Video game designer, director, producer
- Employer: Nintendo (1988–present)
- Works: The Legend of Zelda
- Title: Senior Officer, Nintendo EPD
- Awards: Lifetime Achievement; (Golden Joystick Awards)

Eiji Aonuma (Japanese: 青沼 英二, Hepburn: Aonuma Eiji; born March 16, 1963) is a Japanese video game designer, director, and producer at Nintendo. He is a senior officer within their Nintendo EPD division. He serves as the producer of the Legend of Zelda franchise and has worked on the title since 1998.

== Career ==
Eiji Onozuka was born in Nagano Prefecture, Japan on March 16, 1963. He graduated from the Tokyo University of the Arts in 1988 with a master's degree in composition design, working on animated puppets called karakuri. After graduating, Onozuka was interviewed at Nintendo. He met Shigeru Miyamoto during the interview, and showed Miyamoto samples of his college work. Onozuka got a job at Nintendo without ever having played a video game before. He asked his girlfriend about video games, and she introduced him to two Yuji Horii games, Dragon Quest (1986) on the Famicom and The Portopia Serial Murder Case (1983) on the PC-8801, which were the first video games he ever played. His first projects involved graphic art, creating sprites for Nintendo Entertainment System games such as 1991's NES Open Tournament Golf. Onozuka was director on 1996's Marvelous: Mōhitotsu no Takarajima for the Super NES.

Miyamoto later recruited Onozuka to join the development team for The Legend of Zelda series. Onozuka served as the game scenario director and dungeon designer for The Legend of Zelda: Ocarina of Time. With his surname changed to Aonuma, he served as the director for The Legend of Zelda: Majora's Mask. Following work on The Legend of Zelda: The Wind Waker, Aonuma considered moving on to other projects, but was convinced by Miyamoto to continue with the series. Aonuma has since led the production of The Legend of Zelda: Twilight Princess, Phantom Hourglass, Spirit Tracks, Link's Crossbow Training, Skyward Sword, A Link Between Worlds, Breath of the Wild, and Tears of the Kingdom.

Aonuma plays percussion as a founding member of the Wind Wakers, a brass band formed in 1995. The band comprises over 70 Nintendo employees who perform a few concerts a year. He was promoted to the position of deputy general manager within the company's Entertainment Planning & Development (EPD) division in June 2019. By 2023, Aonuma had been promoted to senior officer at EPD.

== Recognition ==
Aonuma received a lifetime achievement award at the 2016 Golden Joystick Awards. In 2023, the Ministry of Culture in France chose to distinguish Aonuma with the Order of Arts and Letters.

== Ludography ==
Year	Title	Role
1991	NES Open Tournament Golf	Graphic artist
1996	BS Super Mario USA Power Challenge	Graphic artist
1996	Marvelous: Mōhitotsu no Takarajima	Director, graphic artist
1998	The Legend of Zelda: Ocarina of Time	Director, dungeon design
2000	The Legend of Zelda: Majora's Mask	Director
2002	The Legend of Zelda: The Wind Waker	Director
2004	The Legend of Zelda: The Minish Cap	Supervisor
2004	The Legend of Zelda: Four Swords Adventures	Producer
2006	The Legend of Zelda: Twilight Princess	Director
2007	Link's Crossbow Training	Producer
2007	The Legend of Zelda: Phantom Hourglass	Producer
2009	The Legend of Zelda: Spirit Tracks	Producer
2011	The Legend of Zelda: Ocarina of Time 3D	Producer
2011	The Legend of Zelda: Four Swords Anniversary Edition	Producer
2011	The Legend of Zelda: Skyward Sword	Producer
2013	The Legend of Zelda: The Wind Waker HD	Producer
2013	The Legend of Zelda: A Link Between Worlds	Producer
2014	Hyrule Warriors	Supervision
2015	The Legend of Zelda: Majora's Mask 3D	Producer
2015	The Legend of Zelda: Tri Force Heroes	Producer
2016	Hyrule Warriors Legends	Supervision
2016	The Legend of Zelda: Twilight Princess HD	Producer
2017	The Legend of Zelda: Breath of the Wild	Producer
2018	Hyrule Warriors: Definitive Edition	Supervision
2019	The Legend of Zelda: Link's Awakening	Producer
2020	Hyrule Warriors: Age of Calamity	Supervision
2021	The Legend of Zelda: Skyward Sword HD	Producer
2023	The Legend of Zelda: Tears of the Kingdom	Producer
2024	The Legend of Zelda: Echoes of Wisdom	Producer
2025	Hyrule Warriors: Age of Imprisonment	Supervision
2026	The Legend of Zelda: Ocarina of Time	Producer
