= The Legend of Zelda: A Link Between Worlds =

2013 video game

- North American box art featuring the main character Link (right) merged to a wall and his main weapon, the Master Sword (center)
- Developer: Nintendo EAD
- Publisher: Nintendo
- Director: Hiromasa Shikata
- Producer: Eiji Aonuma
- Designer: Kentaro Tominaga
- Programmer: Shiro Mouri
- Artist: Koji Takahashi
- Writers: Tatsuya Hishida; Mari Shirakawa
- Composer: Ryō Nagamatsu
- Series: The Legend of Zelda
- Platform: Nintendo 3DS
- Release: EU/NA: November 22, 2013; AU: November 23, 2013; JP: December 26, 2013
- Genre: Action-adventure
- Mode: Single-player

The Legend of Zelda: A Link Between Worlds (Note: Japanese: ゼルダの伝説 神々のトライフォース2 (Zeruda no Densetsu: Kamigami no Toraifōsu Tsū) (translated as: The Legend of Zelda: Triforce of the Gods 2) ゼルダの伝説 神々のトライフォース (Zeruda no Densetsu: Kamigami no Toraifōsu) is the Japanese title for A Link to the Past which its translated name being Triforce of the Gods.) is a 2013 action-adventure game developed and published by Nintendo for the Nintendo 3DS. The game is the 17th in The Legend of Zelda series and is a spiritual sequel to the 1991 title The Legend of Zelda: A Link to the Past. Announced in April 2013, A Link Between Worlds was released in Australia, Europe, and North America in November, and in Japan a month later.

The story is set many years after the events of A Link to the Past. Players assume the role of Link, who sets out to restore peace to the kingdom of Hyrule after the evil sorcerer Yuga captures Princess Zelda and escapes through a rift into the parallel world of Lorule. Yuga desires to kidnap the Seven Sages and use their power to resurrect the demon king Ganon. Shortly into his adventure, Link obtains a magic bracelet that grants him the ability to merge into walls as a 2D painting, which allows him to reach new areas and travel between the worlds of Hyrule and Lorule.

Concept development began with a small team in 2009, shortly following the completion of Spirit Tracks. During this phase, the game mechanic of Link merging onto walls was prototyped. However, development suffered several setbacks and ceased entirely in late 2010 as core team members were reassigned to different projects. Development restarted in 2011 and the game entered full production in 2012. At the request of series creator Shigeru Miyamoto, the game's world and setting were based on A Link to the Past, though with many of the areas significantly reworked. The game's designers sought to rethink the established conventions of the series, leading to two key changes in the game's structure: allowing players to clear the majority of dungeons in any order they choose, and the introduction of the item rental system.

A Link Between Worlds received critical acclaim, with praise towards its soundtrack, engaging gameplay and new features, and nostalgic feeling, though the art style received mixed reviews. The game also received multiple awards and nominations. It sold over 2.5 million copies worldwide in its first five months, and over 4.26 million copies worldwide by 2022. It received a direct sequel, Tri Force Heroes, in October 2015.

== Gameplay ==
Link's ability to merge onto walls allows the player to enter Lorule and reach previously inaccessible areas.

The Legend of Zelda: A Link Between Worlds is an action-adventure game presented in stereoscopic 3D polygonal graphics, with gameplay predominantly experienced from a top-down perspective. Players control a young boy named Link, who embarks on an adventure to rescue the Seven Sages and defeat Yuga, the primary antagonist. The game is set in two kingdoms—Hyrule and Lorule—both of which bear a nonlinear structure and similar layout, but contrast in style and tone. A Link Between Worlds is a successor to the 1991 Super Nintendo Entertainment System game A Link to the Past, and is similar in many aspects. The worlds of Hyrule and Lorule in A Link Between Worlds are analogous to A Link to the Past's depiction of Hyrule and the Dark World. A number of items, enemies, and audio tracks featured in A Link to the Past return in A Link Between Worlds.

The top screen of the Nintendo 3DS displays hearts, an energy gauge, and an action icon. Link's life energy decreases when he is hit by an enemy and can be replenished by collecting hearts that can be found in a variety of ways, such as defeating enemies, breaking pots, or cutting shrubbery. The energy gauge governs item and ability usage; it depletes on use and replenishes over time. The action icon notifies the player of interactive objects. A map of the kingdoms is displayed on the bottom screen of the 3DS, showing Link's current position and marked locations. The bottom screen is also used to view and select Link's gear and items.

Friendly and enemy non-player characters inhabit the two worlds. Friendly characters can provide Link with assistance or side quests to complete. Link wields a sword and shield, which can be used to defeat enemies and deflects their attacks. Other combat items from past Zelda games return, such as the bow, the fire rod, and bombs. Unlike previous games, the methods for obtaining and using these items is different. Rather than finding them in dungeons, they are rented or purchased from the merchant Ravio. If Link dies, his rented items will be returned to Ravio. They also do not require ammunition; instead, their use is limited by a shared energy gauge. Link's total life energy can be increased by collecting heart pieces. His weapons can be upgraded by completing a long term side quest that involves searching for small hidden creatures and returning them to their parent. Link can also participate in several minigames to earn rupees, Hyrule's primary currency.

As with many previous The Legend of Zelda games, solving puzzles and clearing dungeons is a fundamental part of gameplay. Progression through A Link Between Worlds is more open-ended than previous titles, with the possibility of tackling many of the dungeons in any order. Certain dungeon obstacles will require the use of the rented or purchased items. Towards the end of each dungeon, Link will encounter a boss that must be defeated. A unique mechanic is Link's ability to merge onto walls and move horizontally along them. Link is presented as a mural when he is merged on a wall, and the perspective shifts to a side view to follow Link around corners. While merged to a wall, Link's energy gauge will deplete. The mechanic can be used to traverse the environment, solve puzzles, avoid hazards, reach previously inaccessible areas, and travel between Hyrule and Lorule via fissures that connect the two kingdoms.

The game uses the 3DS's Play Coin and StreetPass systems. Play Coins can be used to request a tip from Hint Ghosts that are located at points of interest. If another system that has played the game is passed by via StreetPass, a shadow version of their Link will appear somewhere on the field. Players can fight against these Links, which are AI-controlled opponents based on their game's data. Winning against Shadow Link earns a rupee bounty based on their difficulty, and achievements can be earned for fulfilling certain conditions. A more challenging "Hero Mode" is unlocked upon completing the main adventure, wherein the player takes four times the damage.

== Synopsis ==
=== Setting ===
The Legend of Zelda: A Link Between Worlds takes place in a fictional fantasy setting. Within the series's chronology, A Link Between Worlds falls in the "Defeated Hero" timeline, taking place some time after the events of A Link to the Past and falling between the Oracle games and the original The Legend of Zelda. The game is set in Hyrule, a location used in many past Zelda games, and Lorule, a new kingdom that acts as Hyrule's dark twin. An ancient Hyrulean legend tells of the events prior to A Link Between Worlds. Ganon sought to dominate the kingdom using the power of the sacred Triforce, but he was defeated by a legendary hero and sealed away by the Seven Sages. The Triforce was divided into three pieces to prevent evil from rising again. One part stayed with the royal family, one part was returned to Ganon, and the third part took its rightful place in the heart of the hero and his descendants. Lorule is a kingdom that once possessed a Triforce, which was destroyed to stop Lorule's people from fighting for its power. Without a Triforce, Lorule decayed and became a ruined land. In A Link Between Worlds, Princess Zelda rules Hyrule, while her counterpart Hilda rules Lorule.

=== Plot ===
Link, the apprentice of a blacksmith, goes to deliver a sword to a captain at Hyrule Castle, only to encounter a mysterious figure named Yuga, who transforms a descendant of one of the Seven Sages, Seres, into a painting. Link underestimates Yuga and is defeated. A merchant, Ravio, proposes help to Link and gives him a bracelet and his items. To Ravio's advice, Link reports the events to Princess Zelda. She gives him the Pendant of Courage; in Hyrule exist three Pendants of Virtue that, once found, give the power to wield the Master Sword. During his search, Link finds Yuga turning another descendant of the Seven Sages, Osfala, into a painting and defeats him but is trapped within a wall, allowing the latter to flee. Yuga's curse is contained into Ravio's bracelet, giving Link the ability to break free and merge into structures at will.

Link uses his new power to find the other Pendants of Virtue; successful, he finds the Master Sword and visits Zelda, only to witness Yuga capturing her into a painting and confronts him once more. Yuga flees into a dimensional crack leading to Lorule. The captured sages are used to resurrect Ganon, whom Yuga merges with. Lorule's princess Hilda assists Link by trapping Yuga.

To Hilda's orders, Link treks through Lorule to rescue the Seven Sages across the kingdom's dungeons. Each rescued Sage is brought to the Chamber of Sages. With the Seven Sages rescued, their combined powers conjure the Triforce of Courage for Link, worthy of wielding it. Link returns to Lorule Castle to confront Yuga. However, before he could do so, Hilda steals Zelda's Triforce of Wisdom and reveals her goal: long ago, Lorule was once a peaceful kingdom until her ancestors destroyed its Triforce to end a civil war, causing Lorule to fall into its current ruined state. Deciding to use Hyrule's Triforce, she sent Yuga to steal the Triforce of Courage from Link, to no avail; she tricked Link into finding it himself for her. With the complete Triforce, Yuga betrays Hilda by trapping her in a painting to get the Triforce for himself. Link confronts Yuga and finally defeats him, restoring the two princesses. During Hilda's apology, Ravio suddenly appears, revealing himself as Link's counterpart. He and Hilda make amends and decide to help each other in rebuilding Lorule.

Link and Zelda return to Hyrule, and use its Triforce to grant their wish; Lorule's Triforce is restored and the kingdom returns to its former glory. Link returns the Master Sword to its pedestal and leaves with both the returned Sages and Zelda. (Note: As depicted in the game's secret "Hero Mode".)

== Development ==
=== Concept and production ===
In late 2009, following the completion of Spirit Tracks for the Nintendo DS, the majority of its development team were assigned to work on Skyward Sword for the Wii. Three members of the Spirit Tracks team began working on a new handheld Zelda game for the upcoming Nintendo 3DS console. Two of the three members working on the new game were Hiromasa Shikata and Shiro Mouri. During this early phase, they had not considered developing a sequel to A Link to the Past; instead they were building a game around the theme of "communication". Around six months into the project, they presented their concept for the game to series creator Shigeru Miyamoto, who called the idea outdated. The three then decided to rethink the concept.

Shikata proposed the idea of Link having the ability to enter and merge onto walls; this feature would eventually become one of the unique gameplay aspects. Within a day, Mouri had created an initial prototype to demonstrate the feature, and seeing it in action led to an influx of ideas. Link was able to transform from a 3D character to a 2D character by entering walls, and then move smoothly around corners to reach places he previously could not. This ability opened up possibilities for creating new puzzles and using new mechanics. At this stage in the project, they still considered the game an extension of the DS Zelda games and used the same viewpoint and design of Link from Spirit Tracks. Around October 2010, the prototype was presented to Miyamoto, who approved of the new concept. However, within two weeks of entering production, core members of the development team were reassigned to work on launch games for Nintendo's Wii U console which was scheduled for release in 2012. With the team disbanded, development ceased.

In November 2011, Skyward Sword was released for the Wii, and Zelda series producer Eiji Aonuma began thinking about the next project in the series. While Nintendo had released a remake of Ocarina of Time for the 3DS, demand for an original Zelda game on the 3DS was growing. Aonuma chose to revisit the idea of Link entering walls. With Shikata and Mouri still engaged in the development of Wii U launch games, Aonuma decided to revive the project without its core members, 13 months after it was shelved. Kentaro Tominaga was brought onto the team to continue where Shikata had left off. He refined the system of entering walls and designed some small dungeons, which he presented to Miyamoto in May 2012. Tominaga planned to create 50 more small dungeons that would use the wall-entering mechanic, but Miyamoto criticised this approach and suggested basing the new game on A Link to the Past. Aonuma proposed combining the wall-entering mechanic with the top-down perspective and landforms of A Link to the Past. He felt that the shift in perspective when entering a wall would be complemented by the stereoscopic 3D capabilities of the 3DS. Aonuma converted the two-dimensional landforms of A Link to the Past into three-dimensional space and the team placed Link into the setting with the wall-entering mechanic to test the feature. After several more presentations to Miyamoto, development of the project was allowed to progress in July. The development team began expanding before the end of 2012, with people joining from finished projects; Shikata rejoined as director and Mouri returned as assistant director and lead programmer. Development was completed in October 2013.

=== Technical and design ===
Implementing the top-down perspective became a particular problem and resulted in a lot of trial and error. With a true top-down view, players would be unable to see characters' faces and bodies. To circumvent this issue, objects in the world were slanted at an angle so they were more visible. Mouri requested that the game run at 60 frames per second instead of 30 to stabilize the stereoscopic 3D and smoothen movement animations. While doubling the frame rate increased the processing load, it allowed the developers to implement a feature where players could select items by dragging and dropping them from their inventory using the Nintendo 3DS's touchscreen and stylus; at 30 frames per second, this feature felt too sluggish for the stylus's movement.

Rethinking the conventions of Zelda became an important theme as development progressed. In previous Zelda games, the player would go into a dungeon, obtain a new item, and then move onto the next dungeon in a specific order. The development team felt that this formula was flawed as a player could get stuck on a dungeon and be unable to progress. They wanted to give the player more freedom in the ways they could advance, allowing them to tackle dungeons in any order and clear multiple dungeons in parallel, but this meant that the method for acquiring items had to be changed. They opted for a system where players could rent or purchase items using rupees. In the final game, rented items are returned to the merchant when the player is defeated, but the team had considered other ideas for returning rented items, such as setting a timer on the rental period and imposing fees if they were returned late. The development team found out about the Nintendo 2DS during production. As the Nintendo 2DS lacked 3D capabilities, the team decided to revise some of the dungeon designs to be certain that they could be completed without the 3D effect.

The designers thought that Link's appearance should change when Link entered a wall and the perspective switched from a top-down view to side view. They chose to make Link a mural while he was on a wall; this led to the creation of the antagonist Yuga, a sorcerer that can transform himself and others into paintings. Aonuma mentioned that the idea of Link turning into a mural was inspired by Phantom Ganon jumping into paintings during his encounter in Ocarina of Time. As the story takes place long after the events of a A Link to the Past and the player travels between the two worlds of Hyrule and Lorule, the development team chose A Link Between Worlds instead of A Link to the Past 2 for the English-language title.

=== Audio ===
A Link Between Worlds features original music along with tracks from A Link to the Past. Ryo Nagamatsu composed and orchestrated new music for A Link Between Worlds, and played the flute music featured in the milk bar. He also composed arrangements and adapted Koji Kondo's original music from A Link to the Past. Nagamatsu wanted to balance arrangements of past music with new music to please both old and new players. He began by revisiting old tracks and thinking how he could best adapt them for A Link Between Worlds. He was eager to include choral performances as a way to add tension to the eerie and unpleasant scenes. Nagamatsu performed the vocals and made use of multitrack recording to layer the different vocals tracks. The audio team decided not to use a live orchestra; the primary reason for this was to create optimal sound for the 3DS. The reverberations and low-pitch sounds created by a live orchestra were not suitable for the 3DS speakers. The majority of the music was created digitally, but with the intent of making it sound live recorded. Most strings were made using a synthesizer, and various guitar and flute renditions of tracks found elsewhere in the game were performed live, with Nagamatsu playing the flute and Toru Minegishi playing guitar.

== Release ==
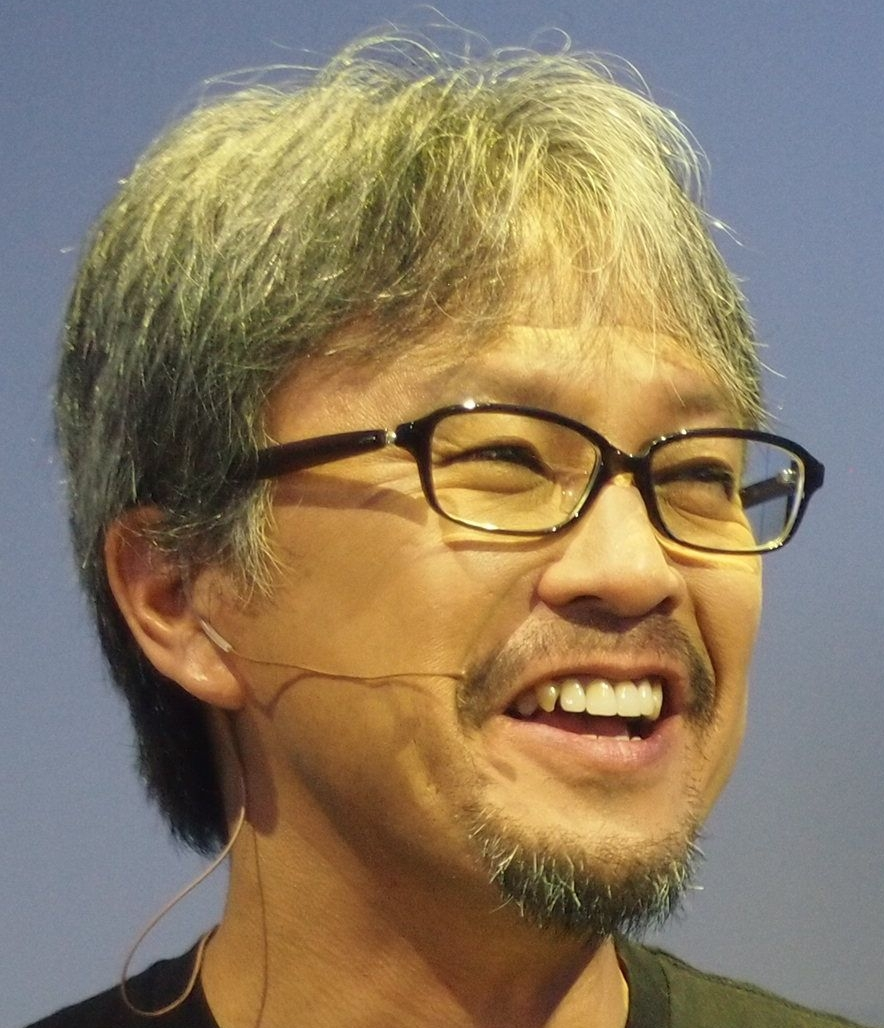
Producer Eiji Aonuma at E3 2013

In April 2013, during a Nintendo Direct presentation, a new The Legend of Zelda game was announced for the 3DS with a late 2013 release date. It was described by Nintendo as a successor to A Link to the Past, set within the same world but featuring new mechanics, new dungeons, and an original story. Shortly after the presentation, Nintendo released a gameplay video on the Nintendo eShop. Later in June, at the E3 expo, the English title was revealed as The Legend of Zelda: A Link Between Worlds. In Japan, it was titled The Legend of Zelda: Triforce of the Gods 2. At the Seattle showing of The Legend of Zelda: Symphony of the Goddesses Second Quest concert tour the same year, A Link Between Worlds was playable along with The Legend of Zelda: The Wind Waker HD.

A Link Between Worlds was released in Europe and North America on November 22, 2013, in Australia the following day, and later in Japan on December 26. The European version of the game contained a reversible cover sleeve; the inside cover featuring multicoloured art and the outside cover featuring the golden-hued version. Nintendo released a bundle including a copy of the game and a themed Nintendo 3DS XL with the Triforce logo. In 2015, A Link Between Worlds was rereleased under the Nintendo Selects label in Europe, along with five other Nintendo 3DS games. Earlier that year, Nintendo released the original soundtrack for A Link Between Worlds on CD in Europe via Club Nintendo. Music from the soundtrack was included in the concert tour The Legend of Zelda: Symphony of the Goddesses Master Quest.

== Reception ==
Reception

Aggregate scores
Aggregator	Score
Metacritic	91/100
OpenCritic	90% recommend

Review scores
Publication	Score
Computer Games Magazine	6/10
Destructoid	6.5/10
Eurogamer	8/10
Famitsu	10/10, 9/10, 10/10, 9/10
Game Informer	10/10
GameRevolution	9/10
GameSpot	9/10
GamesRadar+	4.5/5
Hardcore Gamer	4.5/5
IGN	9.4/10
Nintendo Life	10/10
Nintendo World Report	9.5/10
Polygon	9.5/10
The Guardian	4/5
USgamer	4/5

The Legend of Zelda: A Link Between Worlds received "universal acclaim" according to the review aggregator Metacritic, and it was 2013's second highest scoring 3DS game behind Fire Emblem Awakening. It is also the fourth highest scoring 3DS game of all time on Metacritic. Fellow review aggregator OpenCritic assessed that the game received "mighty" approval, being recommended by 90% of critics, making it the highest-rated 3DS game on the site. Sales tracker Media Create reported that A Link Between Worlds was the top selling video game during its first week of launch in Japan, surpassing 224,000 sales. As of December 31, 2022, A Link Between Worlds has sold 4.26 million copies worldwide.

Many critics saw A Link Between Worlds as a worthy successor to A Link to the Past, but also remarked that it was outstanding in its own right. It was commended for making enhancements to core and traditional elements of the series. New additions and changes to the established formula were also welcomed. Polygon called it the best Zelda game in 20 years, and GamesRadar said it was essential for every 3DS owner. Kotaku felt the story was one of the best and darkest in the series, showing Link in a very different light from previous games. Reception towards the puzzles was positive; praise was directed towards how well the wall-merging mechanic had been incorporated into dungeon puzzles and integrated into every area. IGN thought A Link Between Worlds was Nintendo's best puzzle game. Game Informer wrote some of the dungeons and boss encounters were among the best in the franchise's history. The level of difficulty present in the puzzles and dungeons was met with approval; the challenge was described as a perplexing experience rather than a frustrating one by GameSpot.

Discussing the usage of A Link to the Past's version of Hyrule in A Link Between Worlds, GamesRadar thought that while revisiting familiar places was a nostalgic experience, the mystery of exploring new areas was absent and having to retread the same game world again was "somewhat unsatisfying". GameSpot called the loose structure and openness a "revelatory change", and was glad to see that some restrictions in previous Zelda games were not present. The item rental system was well received, with many reviewers pointing out that the system granted players with more freedom. Game Informer enjoyed having items available from the beginning, saying that it allowed them to experiment in combat. IGN and Polygon agreed that losing rented items upon defeat added another layer of challenge and consequence. Nintendo Life found streamlining the item system allowed a greater emphasis on aspects such as exploration, solving puzzles and boss fights. However, GamesRadar expressed that the missing excitement of finding key items in dungeons was a drawback of the system.

While reviewers agreed that A Link Between Worlds excelled at using the console's 3D capabilities, the art direction was divisive among critics. Some writers disliked the graphics, and others called them gorgeous. Game Informer called the game's soundtrack one of the best in gaming, and GamesRadar thought it was some of the best in the series, praising both the new compositions and the adapted renditions music from A Link to the Past.

=== Awards ===
List of awards and nominations
Award	Category	Result	Ref.
14th Annual Game Developers Choice Awards	Best Design	Nominated	
14th Annual Game Developers Choice Awards	Best Handheld/Mobile Game	Won	
17th Annual D.I.C.E. Awards	Game of the Year	Nominated	
17th Annual D.I.C.E. Awards	Adventure Game of the Year	Nominated	
17th Annual D.I.C.E. Awards	Handheld Game of the Year	Won	
The Daily Telegraph's Video Game Awards 2013	Best Level Design	Nominated	
EGM's Best of 2013	Best Game	Third	
EGM's Best of 2013	Best of 2013: Reader's Choice	Fourth	
Famitsu Awards 2013	Excellence Award	Won	
Game Informer's Best of 2013 Awards	Best 3DS Exclusive	Won	
GameSpot's Game of the Year 2013 Awards	3DS Game of the Year	Won	
GameSpot's Game of the Year 2013 Awards	Overall Game of the Year	Won	
Giant Bomb's 2013 Game of the Year Awards	Best Game	Second	
Giant Bomb's 2013 Game of the Year Awards	Best Music	Won	
The Guardian's Top 25 video games of 2013	Best Game	Sixth	
IGN's Best of 2013	Best 3DS Action-Adventure Game	Won	
IGN's Best of 2013	Best 3DS Game	Won	
IGN's Best of 2013	Best 3DS Music	Won	
IGN's Best of 2013	Best 3DS Story	Nominated	
IGN's Best of 2013	Best Overall Action-Adventure Game	Nominated	
IGN's Best of 2013	Best Overall Game	Nominated	
IGN's Best of 2013	Best Overall Music	Won	
Nintendo Life's Staff Awards 2013	3DS Retail First-Party Game of the Year	Won	
Nintendo Life's Staff Awards 2013	Overall 3DS Game of the Year	Won	
Nintendo Life's Staff Awards 2013	Overall Game of the Year – Wii U and 3DS	Second	
Official Nintendo Magazine's Awards 2013	3DS Game of the Year	Won	
Official Nintendo Magazine's Awards 2013	Best Audio	Won	
Polygon's Games of the Year 2013	Best Game	Second	
Spike's VGX 2013	Best Handheld Game	Won	

== Legacy ==
A Link Between Worlds has been prominently represented in other Zelda-related media since its original release. In 2016, Ravio and Yuga appeared as downloadable playable characters in the 2014 game Hyrule Warriors. In December 2017, Ravio’s hood appeared in Breath of the Wild as a wearable clothing item added with the DLC The Champions’ Ballad, and later reappeared in the sequel Tears of the Kingdom.

Several music tracks from the game feature in the Super Smash Bros. series on stages based on The Legend of Zelda. In addition, Princess Zelda's design in Super Smash Bros. Ultimate is partially based on her incarnation from A Link Between Worlds, replacing her previous incarnations from Ocarina of Time and Twilight Princess in the previous games.

The game also received a direct continuation in Tri Force Heroes, revealed at E3 2015 and released for the 3DS later that year in October 2015. It featured the same incarnation of Link from A Link Between Worlds travelling to the nearby kingdom of Hytopia, and prominently featured multiplayer gameplay. It received generally mixed reviews and sold over 1.36 million copies worldwide as of December 2020.
