= The Legend of Zelda: Spirit Tracks =

2009 video game

- Promotional artwork
- Developer: Nintendo EAD
- Publisher: Nintendo
- Director: Daiki Iwamoto
- Producer: Eiji Aonuma
- Designers: Hiromasa Shikata; Yohei Fujino; Arisa Hosaka
- Programmers: Shiro Mouri; Masahiro Nitta
- Artists: Koji Takahashi; Koji Kitagawa
- Composers: Toru Minegishi; Manaka Kataoka; Asuka Hayazaki; Koji Kondo
- Series: The Legend of Zelda
- Platform: Nintendo DS
- Release: NA: December 7, 2009; AU: December 10, 2009; EU: December 11, 2009; JP: December 23, 2009
- Genre: Action-adventure
- Mode: Single-player, multiplayer

The Legend of Zelda: Spirit Tracks (Note: Japanese: ゼルダの伝説 大(だい)地(ち)の汽(き)笛(てき), Hepburn: Zeruda no Densetsu: Daichi no Kiteki; lit. "The Legend of Zelda: Train Whistle of the Wide World") is a 2009 action-adventure game developed and published by Nintendo for the Nintendo DS handheld game console and the direct sequel to the 2007 Nintendo DS game Phantom Hourglass. Set a century after the events of Phantom Hourglass, the storyline follows a new Link and the great-great-granddaughter of Tetra, Princess Zelda, as they explore the land of New Hyrule to prevent the awakening of the Demon King Malladus. Players navigate New Hyrule, completing quests that advance the story and solving environmental and dungeon-based puzzles, many requiring use of the DS's touchscreen and other hardware features. Navigation between towns and dungeons is done using a train, which features its own set of mechanics and puzzles.

Production began in 2007 following the release of Phantom Hourglass, with half the team including director Daiki Iwamoto and producer Eiji Aonuma returning. Aonuma got the concept from a children's book and incorporated some of its elements into the game. Originally planned as a quickly produced sequel similar to Majora's Mask, production took two years because of the new features. The character of Zelda was given more agency and a key role in both the narrative and several puzzles, breaking away from her earlier passive characterisations. The game was lauded by critics from both dedicated video game outlets and general journalistic sites. Praise was directed towards its narrative and gameplay concepts.

== Gameplay ==
Link operating the Spirit Train along the Spirit Tracks in the overworld

Spirit Tracks continues its style of gameplay from Phantom Hourglass, in which players use the stylus to control Link and use weapons and items. The game is divided into an overworld, which Link traverses using the Spirit Tracks, and towns and dungeons which he travels by foot. The player alternates between exploring the overworld and exploring towns and dungeons in order to complete the game's main story, but may opt to complete sidequests for further rewards. In the overworld and dungeons, the player is able to make notes on their current map as an aid in puzzle solving and continuing the story.

In the overworld, Link is able to direct his train across land, with the ability to control speed and forward or reverse direction, to turn at track intersections, and to blow the train's whistle to scare animals off the tracks. The player is able to automatically set a route for the train by drawing on the map, though not all locations are immediately available. Later, Link is given a cannon that he can use to defend the train from attacks. Link also eventually gains a cargo car, which he can use to move goods between towns. Some missions require Link to transport a passenger along the rails and require the player to keep the passenger happy.

As the game progresses, the player opens more of the map. In towns and dungeons, the player controls Link using the stylus, directing the character where to go. The stylus is also used to perform attacks and dodges and to select items such as bombs and a boomerang, used for combat and puzzle solving. Certain items, in particular Zelda's pan flute, require the player to blow into the DS's microphone. In the case of the pan flute, completing songs can unlock new magical songs, reveal hidden secrets, heal Link, or restore more of the Spirit Tracks. In certain dungeons, the ethereal Zelda can inhabit Phantom Guardians. The player can direct the possessed Phantom along a stylus-drawn path to attack enemies or simply follow Link. Several puzzles of the game require the player to manipulate Link and the Zelda-possessed Phantom to complete a goal. In towns, the player can have Link speak to its residents, buy goods at local stores, and learn helpful tips.

Unlike Phantom Hourglass, Spirit Tracks does not feature Nintendo Wi-Fi Connection multiplayer. Instead, up to four players can play via DS Download Play, using only one game card, and only one game system per player. This multiplayer mode is non-canonical, as all four players play as different Links, each with different-colored tunics (a style that was used in The Legend of Zelda: Four Swords Adventures). Each player attempts to collect as many Force Gems (of varying sizes, value and number) as possible within a set time limit. Opposition includes the other players, a varying number of non-partisan Phantoms, who will attack any player on sight; and the play stages themselves, with environmental hazards. Results of the most recent game played will show up on a bulletin in most in-game towns and cities. "Tag Mode", an item trading system, is also available between local players.

Similarly to Phantom Hourglass, Spirit Tracks features a central dungeon, which uses a spiral staircase to access upper floors instead of having the player traverse the same floors multiple times as in the previous game. Also, although safe zones are still present, being used to hide from Phantoms, the dungeon does not feature a curse that Link needs to protect himself from for a limited amount of time.

== Synopsis ==
Spirit Tracks is the third and last game in the Adult Era of the "Victorious Hero" timeline within the Zelda continuity; it takes place a century after the events of Phantom Hourglass. Long ago, the Spirits known as Lokomos escaped their realm to end a war with the Demon King Malladus by sealing him away below the Tower of Spirits with the Spirit Tracks, a network of chains that runs across the region. Following the events of Phantom Hourglass, Link, Tetra and the pirates settled the land, with Tetra christening it as New Hyrule after the flooded Hyrule. The inhabitants of New Hyrule develop steam trains that can travel on the Spirit Tracks.

A century later, a new Link successfully graduates as Royal Engineer. At his graduation ceremony in Hyrule Castle, he meets Tetra's great-great-granddaughter Princess Zelda and her chancellor Cole. Zelda befriends Link and asks for his aid in escaping Hyrule Castle to investigate the vanishing Spirit Tracks. On their way to the Tower of Spirits, the source of the Spirit Tracks' power, it is revealed that Cole is a demon serving Malladus. With his accomplice Byrne, Cole disembodies Zelda's spirit from her body. As only a host with sacred blood can sustain Malladus, Cole plans to allow Malladus to possess Zelda's body. Spirit-Zelda flees to New Hyrule Castle, while the Tower of Spirits fragments as the disappearing rails loosen Malladus' bonds. Link attempts to attack Cole, but is knocked unconscious by Byrne.

Link awakens back in Hyrule Castle, where he meets the disembodied Zelda. They manage to enter the Tower of Spirits, and meet the Lokomo Anjean, a friend of Tetra who instructs the two to restore the Tower of Spirits and the Spirit Tracks. Link is almost killed by a Phantom, a guardian of the tower, but Zelda saves him by possessing the Phantom. Together, Link and Zelda discover glyphs that restore the Spirit Tracks, facilitating travel to the regions of New Hyrule. Anjean entrusts Link and Zelda with the Spirit Train, which they use to travel throughout New Hyrule, and the Spirit Flute, a magical pan flute that Link uses to duet with Lokomos across New Hyrule to restore more Spirit Tracks. Together, Link and Zelda defeat servants of Malladus that have corrupted temples in New Hyrule and successfully repair the Tower of Spirits.

On their return, Link and Zelda are ambushed by Byrne, revealed to be a Rogue Lokomo. Anjean battles him and teleports Link and Zelda away. Despite the Tower of Spirits being repaired, Malladus is resurrected into Zelda's body and betrays Byrne before fleeing into the Dark Realm. Anjean instructs the group to find the Bow of Light and Compass of Light. Link does so and Anjean gives him the Lokomo Sword which can kill Malladus. Link and Zelda enter the Dark Realm and remove Malladus from Zelda's body. A reformed Byrne sacrifices himself in the process and Malladus possesses Cole in an final desesperate attempt to destroy the entire world. Calling on the power of the Lokomos via the Spirit Flute, Link and Zelda use the Lokomo Sword and the Bow of Light in tandem to defeat Malladus for good. Anjean, the Lokomos, and Byrne's spirit return to the Spirits' Realm as Link and Zelda hold hands.

A post-credits scene shows Zelda writing in her room; depending on a dialogue choice, Link returns as an engineer to whom Zelda waves from her window, either becomes a royal guard as Zelda watches training, or vanishes on an unknown path.

== Development ==
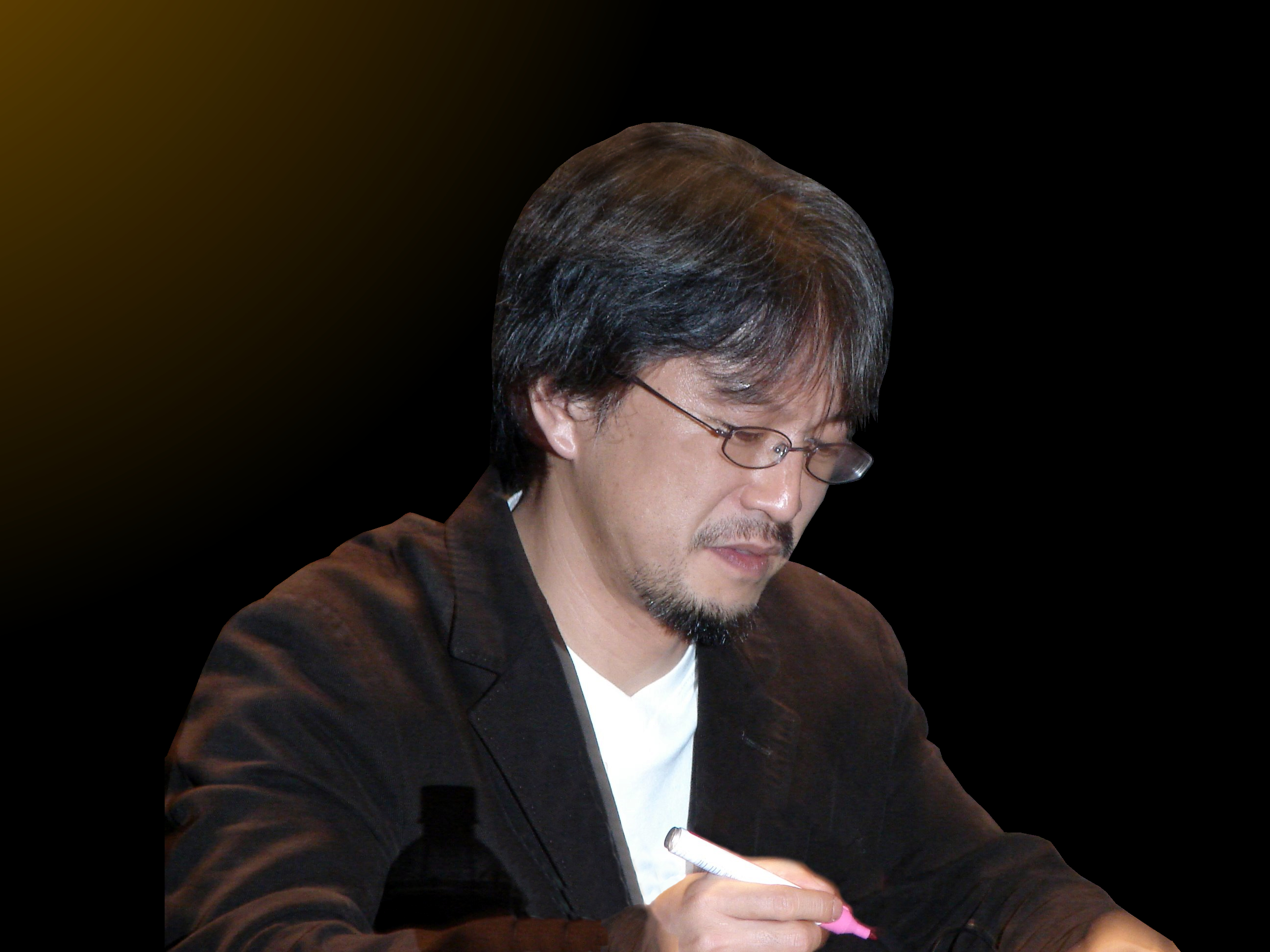
Spirit Tracks producer Eiji Aonuma at the 2007 Game Developers Conference

The Legend of Zelda: Spirit Tracks was developed by Nintendo EAD. It was developed by one part of the Legend of Zelda team, the other working on Skyward Sword. Director Daiki Iwamoto and producer Eiji Aonuma returned from Phantom Hourglass, along with half the original staff. The team were so pleased with the touchscreen design of Phantom Hourglass that they wanted to develop a sequel on the same platform. Their plan was to produce Spirit Tracks on a short schedule, similar to Ocarina of Time sequel Majora's Mask, using ideas that had been proposed and not implemented in Phantom Hourglass. Due to a number of factors, development was extended to two years, double the estimated time. Despite the increased production time, Aonuma described this as a smooth production compared to other protracted or turbulent development cycles of earlier Zelda games. The graphics were chosen, similarly to Phantom Hourglass, as a result of the decision that toon shading would be best to deliver the games on their chosen platform. Aonuma commented that with realistic graphics, it would make the characters poorly scaled to their surroundings, adding that though possible, it was not ideal. The music in the game was composed by Toru Minegishi, Manaka Tominaga, and Asuka Ota. Minegishi wrote the main overworld music and shared the work on field, character and event themes with Tominaga. Series sound composer Koji Kondo contributed the ending theme, while Ota was responsible for some of the music in the multiplayer mode.

The concept for Spirit Tracks came to Aonuma while he was reading a children's book to his son. The book, titled Senro wa tsuzuku, (Note: せんろはつづく; lit. "The Tracks Go On And On") concerned a group of children creating a railway line in a magical countryside region. Iwamoto felt that Spirit Tracks should not be too like other Zelda titles, citing an argument that occurred that the train was not a good fit for the series, splitting the staff between those who thought the train should be changed, and those who successfully fought to keep the train. Aonuma felt that the team had created new ways of playing, while retaining several elements from the series. Aonuma commented that because the puzzles were designed by a designer who was formerly a programmer, they felt different to him. The use of the train was fixed early on, but the concept of players building train tracks was discarded as Aonuma saw it as a "nightmare" to manage. The Tower of Spirits was originally going to function the same way as the Temple of the Ocean King from Phantom Hourglass, requiring the player to climb the tower each time they restore a new floor by going through the tower again from the bottom until they reach it. As development neared its end, Aonuma made a comment about this never giving the feeling of climbing a tower, resulting in the spiral staircase included in the final design.

Using feedback from Phantom Hourglass, the team adjusted the controls so players would find performing Link's actions on the touchscreen easier. They also removed elements that had met with negative feedback from players, such as the time limit imposed on players when going through the previous game's main dungeon. The Spirit Flute was brought up early in the game's development. Because the microphone capabilities were featured so prominently in the game, the team decided to incorporate it into the flute. At an early stage, the team decided to focus on the ability to control and work cooperatively with a Phantom, originally used in Phantom Hourglass as a Wi-Fi battle mode-exclusive character. In questioning why an enemy character would aid Link, the team came up with the idea that a second character would take control of the Phantom; Zelda was ultimately chosen because she was "an interesting and appropriate character". The multiplayer was incorporated based on Miyamoto's liking for The Legend of Zelda: Four Swords, wanting something more than the earlier game's battle mode.

A survey conducted in the United States signified consumers preferred more independent female characters, including Zelda's alter egos Sheik (from Ocarina of Time) and Tetra (from The Wind Waker and Phantom Hourglass). Iwamoto expressed an interest in making Zelda "a more integral part" of Spirit Tracks, in addition to being a more independent character. As a result, Zelda actively adventures alongside Link in spirit form, in sharp contrast to the damsel-in-distress role she fulfills in some earlier installments in the series. There was also a conscious effort to contradict the "princess" aspect of Zelda's character to defy the player's expectations. She was designed and written to behave like any girl her age would, despite her royal status, particularly in her friendship with Link. This is particularly displayed in several comedic scenes early in the game when she is still getting used to being a ghost, and when she becomes hysteric over her missing body.

Aonuma felt that the inclusion of Zelda as Link's partner in both storyline and gameplay was his favourite part of the game, commenting that Spirit Tracks highlights her personality and characteristics better than other titles in the series. While taking place in the same continuity as The Wind Waker and Phantom Hourglass, all the characters except supporting character Niko were new; Niko was used to explain the game's history and setting to players. The team were careful not to focus too much on events from The Wind Waker and Phantom Hourglass, allowing first-time players to enjoy the game. The Japanese names of Lokomos characters were all puns on either train parts or specific models of trains. The antagonists were written to have more personality than in previous entries, with Byrne and Cole being played as contrasting rivals while also being Link's main opponents. Despite the clear signs of peace being restored, the ending was left a little ambiguous so players could imagine what Link and Zelda were doing, and were given a little choice with the question Zelda asks before the final battle.

== Release ==
The game was officially confirmed in March 2009. The game's subtitle differed between English and Japanese. The English version was decided early on before the Japanese subtitle Daichi no Kiteki (Train Whistle of the Wide World) was finalized. Originally using the Spirit Flute, known in Japanese as the "Whistle of the Wide World", was used in the subtitle. Feeling this title would be too long, and after toying with using the English title as inspiration, the current subtitle instead emphasised the train travel across large areas. The Japanese names of world regions paid homage to the subtitle. A limited edition tin was released in Europe for Spirit Tracks. It features a tin box that contains two models from the game—Link and a Phantom.

== Reception ==
=== Pre-release ===
When it was revealed, the fan reaction to Spirit Tracks was stronger than the reaction to the Nintendo DSi reveal beforehand. In his impressions, IGN's Craig Harris found the storyline to be "compelling" with an "interesting premise". He felt that the gameplay was much like Phantom Hourglass, and the plot was enough to get him "jazzed" about Spirit Tracks. IGN UK's Emma Boyes, in her impressions of the multi-player mode, commented that how players can lose the majority of their Force Gems in one hit makes the mode have tension and balance. She called the single and multi-player modes a "huge amount of fun". IGN's Mark Bozon commented that it had a lot of "déjà vu" as well as several great additions to the series. He commented that the controls for Princess Zelda were simple, though her "constant chatter" and "slow movement speed" caused the game to slow down at some parts, but ultimately felt that it was overall a good addition. IGN commented that Spirit Tracks was set to be a "worthy sequel" to Phantom Hourglass. In discussing its potential appearance at E3, IGN's Craig Harris felt that if a playable demo was not featured for it, Nintendo would show an "absolutely epic trailer that will bring fanboys to tears in the same way the company did with Twilight Princess in 2004". They awarded it Best Action game for the Nintendo DS at E3 2009, as well as runner-up for best DS game E3 2009 and best handheld game at E3 2009.

GameSpot's Sophia Tong commented that it was "well on its way to being a worthy sequel" to Phantom Hourglass, adding that the ability of the characters to "convey the mood" of the game was well-done enough without using voice acting. She also praised its improved visuals over Phantom Hourglass. Fellow GameSpot writer Tom Mc Shea commented that it looked as "charming" as its predecessors. Crave Online's Erik Norris called it "hilarious and awesome". He praised the change from sea to land, calling it a "guaranteed must-buy". GamesRadar's Brett Elston questioned the inclusion of train travel, considering how much criticism sailing received, but noted that it would be a strong addition to the series, though only if they were "no more obnoxious than sailing". In his hands-on of Spirit Tracks, Eurogamer's Christian Donlan described the train travel as "natural", calling the railways a "perfect fit" for the cel-shaded world of Spirit Tracks. He called it "another chunk of simple delight; another sweet-natured adventure". It was nominated for best-of-show at the 2009 Gamescom.

The Daily Telegraph included it as one of the top 20 most anticipated games of E3, calling its cel-shaded visuals "beautiful" and "innovative" touch-screen controls. Ars Technica's Ben Kuchera praised it for how it exudes a "very pleasant mood and feel". He adds that he has always anticipated it, but the Phantom and train mechanics give it a "flavor of its own". He also commented on the E3 2009 trailer, stating that fans of the series will "be in heaven". Kotaku's Stephen Totilo criticized the use of the microphone for items, specifically the "Whirlwind" item, commenting that it would make it difficult to play on the subway with dignity. In his "sneak peek" at Spirit Tracks, Toronto Sun's Steve Tilley called it one of his "must-have" video game for the holidays, calling it both "very Zelda-y" and "very fresh". The Independent's Michael Plant called it "hotly-anticipated". Wired named it the third best portable game at E3 2009, with Gus Mastrapa praising it for its "killer dungeons" and "challenging puzzles".

=== Post-release ===
Reception

Aggregate score
Aggregator	Score
Metacritic	87/100

Review scores
Publication	Score
1Up.com	A−
Computer and Video Games	9.1/10
Eurogamer	9/10
Game Informer	8/10
GameRevolution	A−
GameSpot	8.5/10
GameSpy	4.5/5
GamesRadar+	4.5/5
GameTrailers	9/10
Giant Bomb	4/5
IGN	9.3/10
Nintendo Life	9/10
Nintendo Power	9.5/10
Nintendo World Report	9/10
Official Nintendo Magazine	91%
PALGN	9/10
VideoGamer.com	8/10

The Legend of Zelda: Spirit Tracks received generally positive reception, according to review aggregator Metacritic. Nintendo Power called it one of the best handheld The Legend of Zelda titles, commenting that fans of the series would get it either way. Games Master called it "delightful" in spite of how similar it was to Phantom Hourglass. IGN's Mark Bozon commented that while it can "drag on from time to time", praising it as superior to Phantom Hourglass as well as praising it for its bosses, dungeons, and challenge. Computer and Video Games's Mike Jackson commented that while it "doesn't rewrite the rules", it was "engrossing". He also called it an exception to the DS' library in 2009, which was otherwise not exciting.

Official Nintendo Magazine's Fred Dutton agreed with it being familiar, calling it a "wonderful game nonetheless". 1UP.com's Jeremy Parish commented that it "doesn't simply coast along on its legacy", calling it a "fine game in its own right". GameRevolution's Blake Morse called it a "fun take on Zelda games", as well as praising how Princess Zelda accompanies Link. However, he criticized the stylus control issues and when the train rides take too long. Eurogamer's Oli Welsh called it a "tighter and more rounded game" than both Phantom Hourglass and even "most modern games for grown-up consoles". He also commented that the environments are "sometimes shockingly basic", while the characters were "so detailed, so expressive, so exquisitely animated". GamesRadar's Dave Meikleham called it "one of the best Zelda games yet", calling its control scheme intuitive. He adds that the best use of the DS' controls were its items, specifically citing the Spirit Pipes which make use of the DS's microphone. Fellow GamesRadar writer Brett Elston praised the overworld theme, commenting that it put him in an "adventurous mindset", as well as calling it similar to the overworld themes of Phantom Hourglass and The Wind Waker.

Nintendo World Report's Neal Ronaghan praised the addition of the train and the quality of the dungeon designs, though criticizing the lessened exploration and control issues, but he specifically praised the Phantom controls. PALGN's Jeremy Jastrzab commented that while it does not stray from its predecessor much, it features "genuine improvements" over it, citing specifically the flute as a major addition to the gameplay. Despite praising some aspects, he commented that it was not right for a portable game. GameTrailers commented that it "addressed the shortcomings" of Phantom Hourglass, calling it "one of the better outings in the series". GameSpy's Brian Altano praised the game's dungeons and bosses as "some of the most imaginative" in the series. He also called it "one of the series' shining moments", but he criticized the train travel, saying that it makes backtracking tedious. GameSpot's Randolph Ramsay called the dungeons "exciting and well-designed", while also praising its side-quests, boss fights, multi-player, and Phantom gameplay, which he says "adds new depth to the series". Video Gamer's Wesley Yin-Poole praised the controls for Link and Zelda, as well as the visual quality of the characters, but criticized the train mechanic and its "tired features", commenting that the series needs changes to structure and gameplay rather than visuals.

Game Informer's Andrew Reiner commented that he has not seen a game that "fluctuates between highs and lows as frequently" as Spirit Tracks. He called it his least favourite title in the series, praising its controls, while also praising the inclusion of Zelda's effect on the gameplay. However, he criticized Zelda's character, describing her as teenage-angsty Hannah Montana than the calm-yet-troubled princess in previous series iterations. He added that this makes the adventure "taken off course". In a second opinion, fellow Game Informer staff member Phil Kollar similarly called the game mixed, comparing its reception to the NES video game Zelda II: The Adventure of Link. He adds that while glad that Nintendo did something different, it hurt the game more than it helped. RPG Fan's Kyle E. Miller commented that he went into Spirit Tracks with "low expectations", expecting a similar reaction to Phantom Hourglass, which he described as "far from amazing". On the other hand, he still found the title disappointing due to the train mechanic, which he states was a "foolish" idea by the developers to build a game around. He adds that while the dungeons and puzzles are good, it all feels "a little tired, brief, and empty", calling it "most likely the series' worst entry". Giant Bomb's Jeff Gerstmann also found it disappointing in some ways, though he added that the flaws were offset by "terrific puzzle design and a great, fun story that feels noticeably different from the standard "save the princess" saga that series fans are used to seeing".

GamePro's Aaron Koehn praised it for its use of the DS's capabilities, calling the game's offerings a "deep experience", but criticized it for taking too long to get going in the beginning and for doing little to differentiate itself from Phantom Hourglass. RPGamer's Adriaan den Ouden praised the gameplay, commenting that it was "refined" from Phantom Hourglass; on negative side, he criticized its travel as "slow and tedious", also calling the side-quests "weak delivery subquests". Ars Technica's Ben Kuchera praised the train travel, calling it a "solid length" game and praising it for its touch screen usage. He did however criticize it for its slow beginning and lack of innovation. Stephen Totilo praised the characters and towns, commenting that the characters have "good senses of humor". He also praised the train travel, commenting that while it feels long to use the train sometimes, it can be fun if players multi-task. He called it one of the five best-looking games for the DS, but criticized some aspects of it, specifically its flute item, which he says can be unusable if players are playing on a train for instance. IGN UK's Matt Wales called it a "stunningly presented package", praising the graphics as "packed with personality". He called its soundtrack one of the "franchise's best audio offerings in ages". The Daily Telegraph's Nick Cowen called it both one of the best DS games of 2009 and the best video game for all ages of 2009, calling it "challenging and fun" and "chock-full of side-quests". The Daily Telegraph also included it as the ninth best Christmas gift for teenagers, while Cowen and fellow writer Tom Hoggins included it as their honourable mentions in their top 10 list of video games for 2009.

The Guardian's Adam Boult commented that while it was not a "huge leap" from Phantom Hourglass, it is "brimming with innovation", strongly recommending it. While he admits that train travel seems restrictive compared to Phantom Hourglass, these restrictions are eventually "put to good use", making traveling an "engaging challenge". Fellow The Guardian writer Greg Howson found Spirit Tracks to be enjoyable, though criticizing the execution of the Spirit Flute. He listed it as his second favourite DS game.

USA Today's Jinny Gudmundsen called it an excellent game for kids who enjoy the intellectual challenge of puzzles inside a captivating fantasy story filled with interesting characters. She also commented that kids are able to control both a hero and a heroine. The Independent's Rebecca Armstrong called it "endlessly inventive" with "new features galore", citing its usage of the microphone for items. She also called it "pacy, absorbing and very, very playable".

=== Awards and nominations ===
Spirit Tracks was nominated for best handheld game at the Game Developers Choice Awards. It was nominated for the BAFTA GAME Award of 2009 through a reader's choice nomination. Nintendo Life named it runner-up for best Nintendo DS game of 2009, and its readers chose it as their runner-up for best game of the year. It was nominated for several DS-related awards, including best action game, visual excellence, sound excellence, best story, best multiplayer game, and game of the year. It was the readers' choice in every category except for best multiplayer game. IGN, however, named it only one of the runners-up in all of these categories. During the 13th Annual Interactive Achievement Awards, the Academy of Interactive Arts & Sciences nominated Spirit Tracks for "Portable Game of the Year".

=== Sales ===
Spirit Tracks ranked second in its debut week in Japan, selling 291,496 copies. The next week, it fell to third place, selling approximately 126,000 copies. It fell to fifth place the following week, selling approximately 49,000 copies, and falling to eighth place next week, selling approximately 22,000. For the first half of 2010, Spirit Tracks ranked as the 14th best-selling game in Japan, selling 376,054 copies with total sales at the time at 696,995.

Forbes' Brian Caulfield anticipated that Spirit Tracks would strengthen DSi sales for December. IGN predicted that DSi sales would remain steady, due to Spirit Tracks in part. Nintendo listed Spirit Tracks as a title that will have appeal to a wider age group in its financial report. Former Nintendo of America Executive Vice President of Sales and Marketing Cammie Dunaway used Spirit Tracks as a show of its holiday contenders in 2009. Spirit Tracks was anticipated to be the best-selling video game of December 2009 in North America by video game sales analyst Michael Pachter. GamePro predicted that Spirit Tracks would be the fourth best-selling game of December, expecting sales in excess of 725,000 copies. For its debut week, it ranked number one for Nintendo DS games. It retained its position in the following week. Spirit Tracks debuted at 12th place in the United Kingdom's video game sales chart. It was the fourth best-selling DS game in the UK. As of March 2010, Spirit Tracks has sold over 2.61 million copies.
