= The Legend of Zelda: Phantom Hourglass =

2007 video game

- North American box art
- Developer: Nintendo EAD
- Publisher: Nintendo
- Director: Daiki Iwamoto
- Producer: Eiji Aonuma
- Designers: Hajime Takahashi; Yutaka Hiramuki
- Programmer: Shiro Mouri
- Artist: Michiho Hayashi
- Writer: Hidemaro Fujibayashi
- Composers: Kenta Nagata; Toru Minegishi
- Series: The Legend of Zelda
- Platform: Nintendo DS
- Release: JP: June 23, 2007; NA: October 1, 2007; AU: October 11, 2007; EU: October 19, 2007
- Genre: Action-adventure
- Modes: Single-player, multiplayer

The Legend of Zelda: Phantom Hourglass (Note: Japanese: ゼルダの伝説 夢(む)幻(げん)の砂(すな)時(ど)計(けい), Hepburn: Zeruda no Densetsu: Mugen no Sunadokei; lit. "The Legend of Zelda: Hourglass of Dreams") is a 2007 action-adventure game developed and published by Nintendo for the Nintendo DS handheld game console. It is the fourteenth installment in The Legend of Zelda series and the direct sequel to the 2002 GameCube game The Wind Waker. Phantom Hourglass was released worldwide in 2007, with the exception of South Korea in April 2008. It was re-released for the Wii U via the Virtual Console service in the PAL region in November 2015, in North America in May 2016, and in Japan in August 2016.

The game features 3D graphics with cel shading and an overhead camera perspective. It employs controls involving the console's touchscreen and microphone, and took advantage of the Nintendo Wi-Fi Connection for online play until the service was discontinued in 2014. The game's story is set some time after the events of The Wind Waker, focusing on series main character Link's journey to save his friend Tetra from the story's primary antagonist, Bellum, with the help of Linebeck and his ship, the S.S. Linebeck.

Phantom Hourglass received critical acclaim, with praise for its control scheme, world design, and graphics, while some criticized its online features, which were considered too simple. The game received several video game industry awards, including the Nintendo DS Game of the Year award from GameSpot, GameSpy, and IGN. Phantom Hourglass was the best-selling game in its first month in Japan, with 302,887 copies sold. In the United States, it was the fifth-best-selling game in the month it debuted, with 262,800 copies sold. 4.13 million copies of Phantom Hourglass were sold worldwide by March 2008. A sequel, Spirit Tracks, was released in December 2009.

== Gameplay ==
When sailing in Phantom Hourglass, a path can be drawn on the map using the stylus, creating a blue line for the ship to follow.

The Legend of Zelda: Phantom Hourglass is an action-adventure game with gameplay similar to the other games in The Legend of Zelda series. The player controls Link and explores the world to find new items, information, and allies to help him save his friend Tetra and defeat the antagonist Bellum. The game is divided into two gameplay types: sailing between islands, and exploring the islands and their dungeons on foot. While on land, Link discovers and utilizes many items, including the classic boomerang, bow, and bombs. When sailing, the game shows a map of the area on the Nintendo DS's top screen, and a 3D top-down view of Link and his nearby surroundings on the lower touchscreen. The player can bring down the map from the top screen to the lower screen to make notes. During certain events, including most boss battles, a 3D view is shown on both screens, allowing the player to have a wider view of their surroundings. The player controls Link with the stylus, moves him by pointing to the sides of the screen, and uses the stylus to interact with objects and people or attack foes by pointing at them. To travel between islands on the Great Sea, the player controls a paddle steamer called the S.S. Linebeck. The player can plot a course by drawing on a sea chart, redraw the course to make any necessary alterations, shoot at enemies that attack the ship using a cannon, and jump to avoid obstacles.

The game includes a one-on-one multiplayer battle mode. In an arena, one player controls Link, while the other player, on defense, controls three Phantom Guardians. Players of both sides are aided by power-up items that appear on the playing field. Link's goal is to grab a Force Gem and carry it to his base. The other player, controlling the three Phantom Guardians, must find and catch Link before he returns any Force Gems. When Link is caught, or if the round is over, players switch sides. Each multiplayer game consists of three rounds, and in each round, each player takes a turn at both sides. The maximum length of a multiplayer game is 12 minutes, assuming Link does not get caught. The game supports multiplayer both locally and online through the Nintendo Wi-Fi Connection, as well as Download Play. The game is the third The Legend of Zelda game to include multiplayer, following Four Swords and Four Swords Adventures.

Phantom Hourglass introduces the game mechanic of a large dungeon central to the game's story, in this case the Temple of the Ocean King. Link visits the Temple multiple times during the course of the game's story, in order to obtain sea charts that allow him to sail to other parts of the ocean. Throughout the game, the Temple has a curse placed on it that drains Link's life whenever he is inside, but upon obtaining the Phantom Hourglass, Link is able to explore the Temple without being affected by the curse for a limited amount of time. In addition to the curse, Link must contend with Phantoms, a type of enemy exclusive to the Temple. Phantoms are invincible for the most part, necessitating the use of stealth in order to get past them. "Safe zones" are scattered throughout the Temple, and allow Link to avoid both the Phantoms and the Temple's curse. As Link progresses through the game, he is able to access deeper levels of the Temple and stay inside for longer. The Temple, including the puzzles within, will reset whenever Link leaves, but as he obtains new items, he can unlock new routes and shortcuts that enable him to travel through the Temple quicker. All this is done similarly to a dungeon crawler.

== Plot ==
Some time after the events of The Wind Waker, (Note: The Wind Waker ends with Ganondorf petrified into the now-flooded Hyrule, called the Great Sea.) Link and Tetra travel the Great Sea aboard Tetra's ship to find new land when they encounter the Ghost Ship, a ragged ship that appears from a sudden mist. Tetra enters it and is heard screaming. Link fails to come to her help and falls into the ocean as the Ghost Ship vanishes. Washed ashore on Mercay Island, Link meets the fairy Ciela and her adoptive grandfather Oshus, who agree to help him rescue Tetra. Link enlists Linebeck, a miserly treasure hunter who believes the Ghost Ship houses great treasure.

Oshus explains that the Temple of the Ocean King contains sea-glyphs that function as maps, though they are guarded by fierce Phantoms. To access them, Link must free the three spirits from the temples of Power, Wisdom, and Courage. After freeing the Spirit of Power, Link obtains the Phantom Hourglass, a vessel for the Sand of Hours that enables him to explore the Temple of the Ocean King without draining his life force.

Upon rescuing the Spirit of Courage, the group notices its similarity to Ciela. Oshus arrives and reveals that Ciela is one half of the Spirit of Courage; Oshus split Ciela's soul into two after she was attacked by the Evil Phantom Bellum, a demon who consumes all life. With the three Spirits rescued, Link locates the Ghost Ship and finds Tetra, only to find her lifeless and petrified. Oshus reveals that he is the Ocean King and that he took human form after battling Bellum, whom he trapped in the depths of his Temple. He instructs Link to seek three pure metals which can be crafted into the Phantom Sword, a blade capable of defeating Phantoms and Bellum; only by defeating Bellum can Tetra be restored to life. Linebeck is devastated that there is no treasure aboard the Ghost Ship, but continues to help Link when the Ocean King promises to grant him one wish in return for his aid.

After acquiring the Phantom Sword, Link defeats Bellum in the Temple of the Ocean King's depths. He is teleported to Linebeck's ship, where he reunites with a revived Tetra, only for Bellum to take Tetra away to the Ghost Ship. Link destroys the Ghost Ship using Linebeck's cannon, but Bellum possesses Linebeck and forces him to fight Link. In the course of battle, Link kills Bellum, frees Linebeck and rescues Tetra, though Linebeck's ship is destroyed and the Phantom Hourglass's sand whisks from the Phantom Sword into the sea. The Ocean King returns to his true form as a white whale and leaves with the Spirits, granting Linebeck his wish; Linebeck forgoes his wish for treasure to have his ship restored. Link and Tetra are teleported back to Tetra's ship, but Tetra's crew insists their adventure was only a ten-minute dream. Link holds the empty Phantom Hourglass in his hands, confused; looking to the horizon, he smiles by seeing Linebeck's restored ship and believes everything was real.

== Development ==
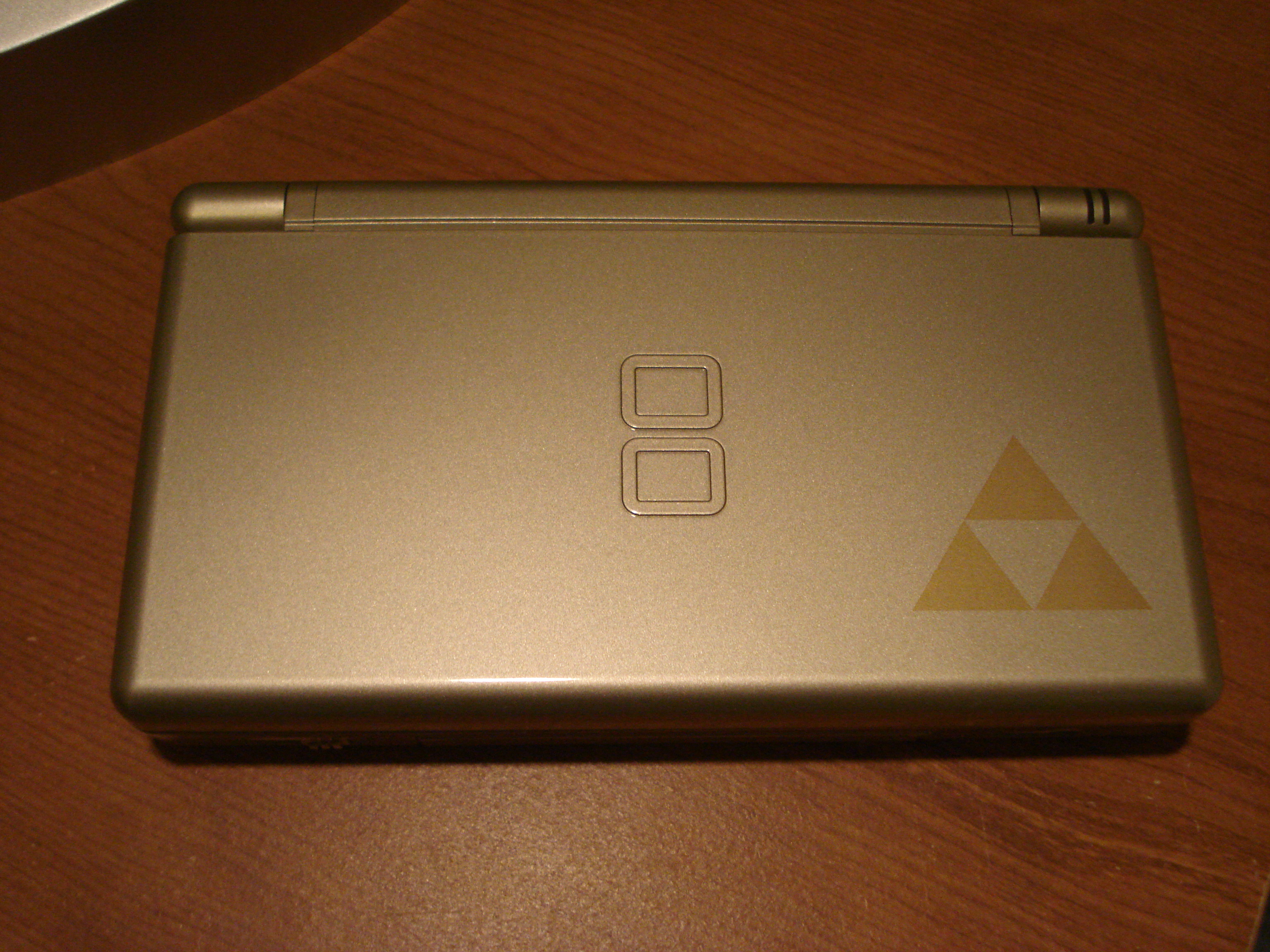
The Gold edition Nintendo DS Lite is emblazoned with The Legend of Zelda's signature Triforce logo.

The development started in May 2004, at which point the game still had gameplay similar to Four Swords Adventures. At a press conference in Japan for the Nintendo DS in October, Shigeru Miyamoto of Nintendo said that they were thinking of bringing Four Swords to the DS, which was later confirmed by Eiji Aonuma at E3 2005. In 2006, Nintendo presented the keynote address at the annual Game Developers Conference, where they also revealed Phantom Hourglass for the first time and presented a demo. Nintendo also revealed that the game would be released in late 2006. For the holiday season, Nintendo launched two special edition Nintendo DS bundles, each in a different color, on November 23, 2007. One of the bundles, the Gold edition, was emblazoned with The Legend of Zelda's signature Triforce logo and sold alongside Phantom Hourglass.

The same development team that worked on Four Swords Adventures also worked on what would become Phantom Hourglass. In the game's first prototype, the action took place in the upper screen while the touchscreen was a flat map that allowed Link to be controlled. However, the developers believed that this interface caused the player to be too disconnected from the game's action, thereby prompting them to switch the two screens. They felt that this interface would appeal to Japanese players, who they said prefer simple interfaces. The developers added a battle mode that was played over Wi-Fi to appeal to American players.

The game takes advantage of the Nintendo DS's stylus in several different ways. The player can draw shapes to open certain doors and plot out the path of ships on the ocean, among other tasks. The device's touchscreen can also be used to direct Link's boomerang. Phantom Hourglass features cel-shaded graphics similar to those of The Wind Waker, with some influence from Four Swords Adventures. Link and Zelda's appearances in Phantom Hourglass resemble those from The Wind Waker.

At E3 2007, Aonuma said that Phantom Hourglass "opened up the [Zelda] series and [gave] a fresh, new control scheme to the aging Zelda formula". He also said that, despite the disappointing sales of The Wind Waker affecting him personally, he still wished to continue the game's style in another Zelda iteration, leading to the inspiration for Phantom Hourglass. Aonuma believed that the game's simple controls, with the help of the Nintendo DS's touchscreen, helped make Phantom Hourglass the first Zelda game to attract casual gamers.

== Reception ==
Reception

Aggregate scores
Aggregator	Score
GameRankings	88.82%
Metacritic	90/100

Review scores
Publication	Score
1Up.com	A
Computer and Video Games	10/10
Edge	9/10
Eurogamer	9/10
Famitsu	10/10, 10/10, 10/10, 9/10
Game Informer	9.5/10
GamePro	5/5
GameRevolution	A−
GameSpot	9/10
GameSpy	5/5
GameTrailers	8.9/10
GameZone	9.3/10
IGN	9/10
Nintendo Life	9/10
Nintendo Power	9.5/10
Nintendo World Report	7.5/10
Official Nintendo Magazine	95%
X-Play	4/5
The A.V. Club	A

Phantom Hourglass was released in Japan on June 23, 2007, in the rest of the world in October, and in South Korea on April 3, 2008. According to Metacritic, it received "universal acclaim". Praise focused on the use of the Nintendo DS features, while criticism targeted its more casual gameplay compared to the previous games in The Legend of Zelda series. Phantom Hourglass was the best-selling game in its debut month of June 2007 in Japan, selling 302,887 copies. In the United States, Phantom Hourglass was the fifth best-selling game in its debut month of October 2007, selling 262,800 copies. As of March 2008, 4.13 million copies of the game have been sold worldwide, with 910,000 of those copies in Japan.

Computer and Video Games called Phantom Hourglass one of the few "masterpieces" on the Nintendo DS, which made it "worth every penny". Believing that Phantom Hourglass improves on everything that was great about its predecessor, The Wind Waker, GamePro predicted that the sequel would be another successful game in the franchise. Although feeling that the game does not live up to the standards set in Twilight Princess, Game Informer still felt that the adventure is worthy of The Legend of Zelda series, and noted that it "has enough great stuff going for it" for them to consider it one of the year's best video game adventures. GameZone enjoyed the "spectacular blend of touch-screen combat, brilliant puzzles, and Wind Waker beauty" in Phantom Hourglass, calling it a "can't-miss adventure" and one of Nintendo's and the year's best games. Hyper's Jonti Davies commended Phantom Hourglass for its "perfect controls and supreme world and dungeon designs", but criticized the game for only giving around 30 hours of gameplay.

GameRevolution appreciated the game's graphics, and noted that it uses the Nintendo DS's features better than any other game for the console. Praising its "innovative" and "fun" control scheme, GameSpot felt that Phantom Hourglass gave a new life to several of the series' age-old concepts. X-Play wrote that Phantom Hourglass definitely felt like a The Legend of Zelda game, calling it another successful video game for the franchise and a "must-have" for anyone that owns a Nintendo DS. The Onion's entertainment newspaper The A.V. Club remarked that Phantom Hourglass exploits the Nintendo DS's touchscreen to the fullest extent in an imaginative and genuinely fun way. In a perfect 5-star review, Empire stated that Phantom Hourglass is one of Nintendo's greatest achievements and a contender for the best handheld adventure in console history.

Issues that were mentioned in reviews regarding the game included its more casual gameplay compared to the previous The Legend of Zelda games, which was not well received by some. GameSpy felt that the game was both easy and approachable enough for casual gamers to play, but sufficiently rewarding and challenging to satisfy hardcore fans of The Legend of Zelda series. IGN believed the game to be "more casual than we'd like", but still found it captivating, entertaining, and "a true adventure worthy of the Zelda name", calling it "different, but it's still the real deal". GameTrailers stated that the short dungeon levels and hand-holding exploration are "outright disappointing", but when comparing Phantom Hourglass to the other Nintendo DS games, they conceded that it was still an impressive game, but just a good game when compared to The Legend of Zelda standards. 1UP.com pointed out that the biggest problem with Phantom Hourglass is that it falls back on using innovations from the previous The Legend of Zelda games, rather than including new and original ideas.

Finding it difficult for hardcore gamers to fully enjoy Phantom Hourglass, Nintendo World Report claimed that the game's lack of alternative control schemes was a telling sign that Nintendo did not have The Legend of Zelda fans in mind when creating the game. They still described the game as "decent", but felt that it departs from the rest of the series and that Nintendo should have taken the risk in creating innovations for this game. The American newspaper The New York Times enjoyed Phantom Hourglass for the most part, but complained about the timer in the Temple of the Ocean King as unnecessary and gimmicky, remarking that the game's dungeons are only "fun to go through once, but none of them are fun enough to go through 20 times". They noted that the time spent traveling through dungeons "removed all thoughts of it being perfect".

Several websites named Phantom Hourglass the 2007 DS Game of the Year, including IGN and GameSpy. It was also mentioned in Best of the Year lists from Wired, Time, and Edge. The game received Editor's Choice awards from GameSpot and IGN. It was also named Best Adventure Game by 1UP.com. The game was designated the Best Handheld Game at the 2008 Golden Joystick awards, the 2008 Game Developers Choice Awards, the 2007 GamePro Editors' Choice awards, and the 2007 Spike Video Game Awards. At E3 2006, Phantom Hourglass was designated as the Best Nintendo DS Game by GameSpot and the Best Handheld Game at the Game Critics Awards. In 2008, the Academy of Interactive Arts & Sciences awarded Phantom Hourglass with Handheld Game of the Year, along with a nomination for Outstanding Achievement in Gameplay Engineering. The game placed 38th in Official Nintendo Magazine's 100 Greatest Nintendo Games of All-Time.
