= Taro the Space Alien =

Manga and anime series

うちゅう人田中太郎 (Uchūjin Tanaka Tarō)
- Manga
- Written by: Yasunari Nagatoshi
- Published by: Shogakukan
- Magazine: CoroCoro Comic
- Original run: August 1998 – September 2004
- Volumes: 14
- Anime television series
- Directed by: Yorifusa Yamaguchi
- Produced by: Ryoji Shimizu
- Written by: Michihiro Tsuchiya; Koji Ueda
- Music by: Cher Watanabe
- Studio: Studio Hibari
- Licensed by: NA: Viz Media; (canceled)
- Original network: TV Tokyo
- Original run: April 17, 2000 – March 30, 2001
- Episodes: 24

Taro the Space Alien (Japanese: うちゅう人田中太郎, Hepburn: Uchūjin Tanaka Tarō) is a manga series created by Yasunari Nagatoshi. In 2000, the manga received the Shogakukan Manga Award for children's manga.

Viz Media is the licensor of the series in the United States. The series has not had a release in English.

The series' protagonist is Takashi Horimachi (堀町 タカシ, Horimachi Takashi), a fifth grader at "Anytown" Elementary School. A transfer student named Taro Tanaka (田中 太郎, Tanaka Tarō) enters Takashi's class. Taro Tanaka turns out to be a space alien. Takashi becomes obsessed with trying to figure out the origins of Taro.

== Summary ==
Takashi is just a regular fifth grader when a new student, Taro Tanaka, appears. Later Takashi realizes that Taro is an alien and tries to find out more about him. He has many adventures with Taro. Takashi soon gets into much trouble and starts to have a bad reputation because of Taro such as giving his childhood friend Kyoko an explosive bomb for her birthday (which Taro had switched with a Taro doll Takashi had meant to give Kyoko). Taro also constantly makes Takashi annoyed, like one time Taro invited Takashi to his birthday party, but Taro made Takashi walk to the end of a long hallway to go to his room (at the end of the hall was a sign that said turn around). When they went back to the beginning of the hall, Takashi finds that Taro's room was hidden near the entrance of Taro's house. Taro also makes Takashi really embarrassed like for example, Taro somehow made the entrance to a bathroom of an amusement park turn into a rollercoaster ride where all Takashi's clothes flew off and he was stuck up there the entire day, hanging on for life.

== Characters ==
Taro Tanaka (田中太郎, Tanaka Tarō)
Voiced by: Punch UFO

The main character of this work. A mysterious alien who suddenly transferred to Tonari Elementary School. He is from Magnum, the 15th planet of the Galactica Nebula, 200 light years away from Earth. He has horns on his head and always wears an orange T-shirt with the word "ta" written in red. When you turn the handle on the back, the capsule comes out from the buttocks, the arm can be extended (however, there is a limit, and near the final episode, it can only be extended once), the head can be exchanged, and the head with various expressions can be created. There are many actions that are alien to humans, such as holding someone else's face, turning someone else's face into a beautiful face, and transforming into multiple Taro squads alone. He confuses two birds with one stone with one stone and two birds. His first person is "boku". Due to the above properties, there is a theory that he is actually a robot, and Takashi actually said such a thing in the second reading. His school grades are excellent. He swings around Takashi, but he often mentions in the play that he is seriously "best friends" and "feels friendship". His family has many appearances such as his brother, sister, and grandfather, but for some reason his parents turn their heads and switch between father and mother. However, in Volume 12, Part 4, his father and mother appeared separately. In the final episode, he returned to space with Hanako and others to transfer to his hometown Phantom Elementary School, and after helping Takashi, who was beaten by a delinquent, with an arm that can only be stretched one more time (he says he wants to stretch it when it's more important), "We will always be friends," he said goodbye.

Takashi Horimachi (堀町タカシ, Horimachi Takashi)
Voiced by: Sachi Matsumoto

A fifth-grade boy who seems to be everywhere. A relatively common sense person and a thrust against Taro. Takashi is always caught up in the turmoil caused by Taro, but seriously thinks of him as a close friend and somehow gets along with him. Takashi never tends to get a good grades in school in contrast to Taro's, but he's fast. He also has erotic books hidden in his room. He has a knack for jumping, and he almost always jumps Taro (or his companions) several times per episode. In addition, he once became Kitaro of Taro Corps (because Kitaro caught a cold). His birthday is August 8 (from the twelfth volume, part 5). When Takashi found out that Taro had returned to space the next day when I was resting due to a cold in the final episode, at first he thought it was a usual joke and didn't believe it, but when I heard Kyoko's story, it was true. I was convinced that there was something, and I was convinced that the reason for the transfer was due to the abusive language I spewed. After that, after watching a message video delivered to the club room of the club that Taro once presided over, he visited the house where Taro used to live, but was shocked to find that the house had been sold. He lost his ambition and was scolded by his homeroom teacher, saying he was "out of his mind." After that, when I was thinking about the future dream composition given by my homeroom teacher, I got angry at the delinquent who insulted the alien and started a fight. I realize that I was helping by laughing and playing gags. After that, he falls into a pinch of desperation, but his arm, which Taro said he wanted to stretch at the last moment, appears from space and saves him. With tears in his eyes, he sees off Taro's arm as he returns to space, and decides to become an astronaut in the future and meet Taro again. In the special edition published in "Korokoro Aniki", after 15 years of hard work, he became an astronaut and reunited with Taro on Taro's home planet.

Kyoko Asada (浅田きょう子, Asada Kyoiko)
Voiced by: Chinami Nishimura

Popular in Takashi's class. She's usually kind, but when she's angry, she's frightening, and sometimes gets angry with Takashi and Taro. She had wavy semi-long hair in the early days of the original, but later she had straight hair (in the anime, she has twin tails). She was also very popular in her early days, and Takashi liked her and invited her on a date at first, but from the latter period, her turn decreased and Takashi became less conscious of her. rice field. In the future, she married Taro and had a child named Tarosuke, but this setting was discarded when Hanako appeared later.

Yutaka Matsunouchi (松野内ユタカ, Matsunouchi Yutaka)
Voiced by: Hyo-sei

Takashi's classmate and friend. He is laid-back and gluttonous. Since he is mostly a supporting character, there are few lines in the manga, and his name itself was not set in the early days. He appears relatively frequently in anime.

Yuji (ユウジ, Yūji)
Voiced by: Kurumi Mamiya

It is an anime original character and does not appear in the original work. A rich boy who wears glasses and is Takashi's classmate. Although he is well-educated, he has a sarcasm personality and looks down on Takashi and Yutaka.

Masami (マサミ, Masami)
Voiced by: Sawa Ohno

One of the anime original characters that does not appear in the original. A classmate of Takashi Horimachi and a friend of Rie, who is also an anime original character, and plays the role of Tsukkomi. She is a boyish girl with a masculine personality, and she often criticizes Rie, who has a lot of natural stupid behavior. Her family is a fishmonger, and her father is one of the few people who laughs at her teacher's dad jokes.

Rie (リエ, Rie)
Voiced by: Mayuko Omimura

One of the anime original characters that does not appear in the original. A classmate of Takashi Horimachi and a friend of Masami, who is also an anime original character. Her surname is "Tomosaka". She has an easy-going personality, and she's quite a natural blur and glasses girl who goes at her own pace. She often speaks and acts naturally and is reproached by Masami. She has a penchant for extraterrestrial beings and mysterious things such as Taro and Alien Mechawar, so-called Fushigi-chan. While the classmates around her are swayed by Taro's turmoil, she is often the only one with shining eyes and is excited, and she often tsukkomi to Masami and her other classmates. It is Her family consists of a gentleman-like father in a tuxedo and a low-key mother in Japanese clothes. Her club activity is the archery club.

Teacher (先生, Sensei)
Voiced by: Showtaro Morikubo

Homeroom teacher of Takashi's class. His hobby is playing gags, and his students don't like him, but Taro loves him.

Principal (校長先生, Kouchou)
Voiced by: Toshihide Tsuchiya

The principal of Tonari Elementary School. In the original work, he has a stern face and does not appear often, but in the anime, he has a big-hearted personality that always keeps a smile on his face. He was also transformed into a young, tall and beautiful figure by Taro's skill.

Vice Principal (教頭先生, Kyōtō-sensei)
Voiced by: Yuko Kato

The vice-principal of Tonari Elementary School. She always accompanies the principal. She has chignon hair and glasses, and has a great style. She has a strict personality when it comes to her education, scolding Takashi for being late.

Aliens

James (Frog) (ジェームズ（カエル）, Jēmuzu (Kaeru))

A frog-shaped alien cousin of Taro. In terms of ecology, it likes flies, and when it was a child, it was a tadpole. Like Taro, he has several family members.

Uncle of the Ramen Shop (ラーメン屋のおじさん, Rāmen-ya no Ojisan)

The owner of the ramen shop "UFO Ramen". He is a mysterious alien who rides a saucer to deliver ramen from everywhere and open shops. The ramen made by his uncle is a favorite of Taro and James.

Alien Mechawar (メチャワル星人, Mechawaru Hoshibito)
Voiced by: Kenyu Horiuchi

An alien who came from the "Mechawar Planet" to "destroy the Earth". He adds "~mecha" to the end of his words. He had his spaceship destroyed by Taro, so he decided to stay on Earth. His personality isn't as bad as his name suggests, and if anything, he's good. Originally, he was only scheduled to appear once, but due to his popularity, he appeared several times in the middle. He appears only in one frame even in the final episode. He has also appeared in the special episode of 'Miracle Ball' only once.

Gorgeous Aiko (ゴージャスあいこ, Gōjasu Aiko)
Voiced by: Haruna Ikezawa

A young lady who collects bad taste dolls. She has a selfish and domineering personality, and she competes with Taro. She is described as "Ojou-sama" in the credits.

Hanako Tanaka (田中花子, Tanaka Hanako)

Taro's wife, appearing in Volume 8. She freaks out when she sees a human crotch. In the punch line of her first read-only manga, a person with the same name appears. She also enrolled as a transfer student in place of Taro. She doesn't appear in the anime as a setting.

== Staff ==
- Original Production by Shogakukan Production Co., Ltd.
- Created by Yasunari Nagatoshi
- Originally Published by Shogakukan Inc.
- Executive Producer: Masakazu Kubo
- Producer: Ryoji Shimizu
- Director: Yorifusa Yamaguchi
- Scripts by Michihiro Tsuchiya, Koji Ueda
- Animation Production: Studio Hibari
- Animation Producers: Seji Mitsunobu, Jiro Saito
- Character Designer: Masaru Oshiro
- Art Director: Yoji Yoshikawa
- Music by Cher Watanabe (credited as Cheru Watanabe)
- Music Producer: Takashi Yoshida
- Sound Recording Production: HALF H·P STUDIO (credited as HALF H · P STUDIO)
- Sound Recording Director: Shigeru Chiba

== Theme Songs ==
Opening Song "Tanaka de Shubiduwa"
Lyrics: Kondoria Mito / Composition/Music Arrangement: Cher Watanabe (credited as Cheru Watanabe)
Ending Song "Tanaka Taro no Uta"
Lyrics: Kondoria Mito / Composition/Music Arrangement: Cher Watanabe (credited as Cheru Watanabe)
