= The Legend of Zelda: The Minish Cap =

2004 video game

- North American box art
- Developers: Capcom; Flagship (Note: The Legend of Zelda: The Minish Cap was co-produced by Nintendo Entertainment Analysis & Development.)
- Publisher: Nintendo
- Director: Hidemaro Fujibayashi
- Producer: Keiji Inafune
- Programmers: Toshihiko Honda; Nobuhito Shimizu; Yoshiyuki Fujikawa; Nobuaki Minomiya; Yohei Doi; Koji Yoshida
- Artists: Takenori Kimoto; Haruki Suetsugu
- Composer: Mitsuhiko Takano
- Series: The Legend of Zelda
- Platform: Game Boy Advance
- Release: JP: November 4, 2004; EU: November 12, 2004; NA: January 10, 2005; AU: April 7, 2005
- Genre: Action-adventure
- Mode: Single-player

The Legend of Zelda: The Minish Cap (Note: Japanese: ゼルダの伝説 ふしぎのぼうし, Hepburn: Zeruda no Densetsu: Fushigi no Bōshi; lit. "The Legend of Zelda: The Mysterious Cap") is a 2004 action-adventure game developed by Capcom and Flagship and published by Nintendo for the Game Boy Advance. The twelfth entry in The Legend of Zelda series, The Minish Cap was released for the Game Boy Advance in Japan and Europe in 2004 and in North America and Australia the following year.

The Minish Cap serves as a prequel to Four Swords, telling the origins of the titular Four Sword and the villain Vaati. The game retains many elements common to previous Zelda games, especially top-down predecessors such as A Link to the Past, and includes new features and mechanics. Chiefly, the protagonist Link acquires a magical talking cap named Ezlo, who can shrink Link to the diminutive size of a Minish.

The Minish Cap was well received among critics. It was named the 20th best Game Boy Advance game in an IGN feature and was selected as the 2005 Game Boy Advance Game of the Year by GameSpot. The game was re-released on the Wii U Virtual Console in 2014 and on the Nintendo Classics service in February 2023.

== Gameplay ==
A screenshot of the top-down view used in The Minish Cap

The Minish Cap features gameplay similar to previous Zelda installments. Link must explore an overworld and complete multiple dungeons, acquiring new items and abilities throughout the game.

The titular Minish Cap refers to a new ability that allows Link to transform into "Minish size" using portals throughout the world. Link's smaller size changes his ability to traverse his environments. For instance, a small portal inaccessible to Link in his normal size can be used by Minish-sized Link. A puddle that Link can normally walk over will be too deep for Minish-sized Link to traverse.

Along with items common to Zelda games (such as bombs and arrows), The Minish Cap introduces three new items: the Mole Mitts (allowing Link to dig through earthen walls), the Gust Jar (which sucks up enemies and other objects), and the Cane of Pacci (which flips objects upside-down). In certain areas, the player can create multiple copies of Link; although The Minish Cap is a single-player game, this ability is inspired by the multiplayer-focused Four Swords games. The player can also collect "Kinstones", artifacts that are broken into two fragments. Finding matching Kinstone pieces can progress the game or award other prizes.

== Story ==
=== Setting ===
Within the Zelda chronology, The Minish Cap takes place between Skyward Sword and Four Swords, making it the second story in that timeline. As a prequel to Four Swords, The Minish Cap tells the backstory of Vaati and the creation of the Four Sword, which both feature in Four Swords and its sequel Four Swords Adventures.

=== Plot ===
Centuries ago, Hyrule was ravaged by evil forces until the Picori, a race of tiny creatures, bestowed a young hero with the Picori Sword and the Light Force, using both to trap the world's evils in a chest. The grateful people of Hyrule would hold an annual Picori Festival, with legends stating that a door between their worlds would open every 100 years, allowing the Picori to return. In the present, Link accompanies his childhood friend Princess Zelda to the Picori Festival to deliver a sword for the sword fighting champion who gets to touch the Picori Sword. However, this year's champion, Vaati, destroys the Picori Sword and opens the chest, releasing evil monsters across Hyrule. He then turns Zelda to stone but leaves after seeing that the chest did not contain the Light Force he seeks. As only children can see the Picori, King Daltus orders Link to find them so that the Picori Sword can be reforged to stop Vaati and restore Zelda. Traveling to Minish Woods, Link encounters Ezlo, a magical talking cap, who decides to accompany Link and grants him the ability to shrink to Picori size. The Picori, who call themselves Minish, then task Link with retrieving the Four Elements, magic stones needed to restore the Picori Sword.

Ezlo eventually explains that he was once a Minish sage who created the Minish Cap, a cap capable of granting wishes, but his apprentice Vaati stole the cap and became a powerful sorcerer. Fascinated by evil and seeking the Light Force's power, Vaati used his new abilities to trap Ezlo in his current form. Meanwhile, Vaati disguises himself as King Daltus and takes control of Hyrule Castle. After Link retrieves the Four Elements and infuses them into the reforged White Sword, turning it into the Four Sword, Link and Ezlo learn that the Light Force is passed down within Hyrule's princesses. Vaati overhears this and begins siphoning the Light Force from Zelda.

Link returns to the castle and confronts Vaati, who uses the extracted Light Force to become all-powerful, but Link overcomes Vaati and restores Zelda to normal. Vaati transforms into a demonic form, only to be vanquished by Link, restoring Ezlo to normal. After Zelda uses the Minish Cap to undo all the damage done by Vaati, sacrificing the cap in the process, Ezlo thanks Link for his help, giving him a new green cap as a parting gift, and departs through the door to the Minish Realm before it seals itself for another century.

== Development and promotion ==
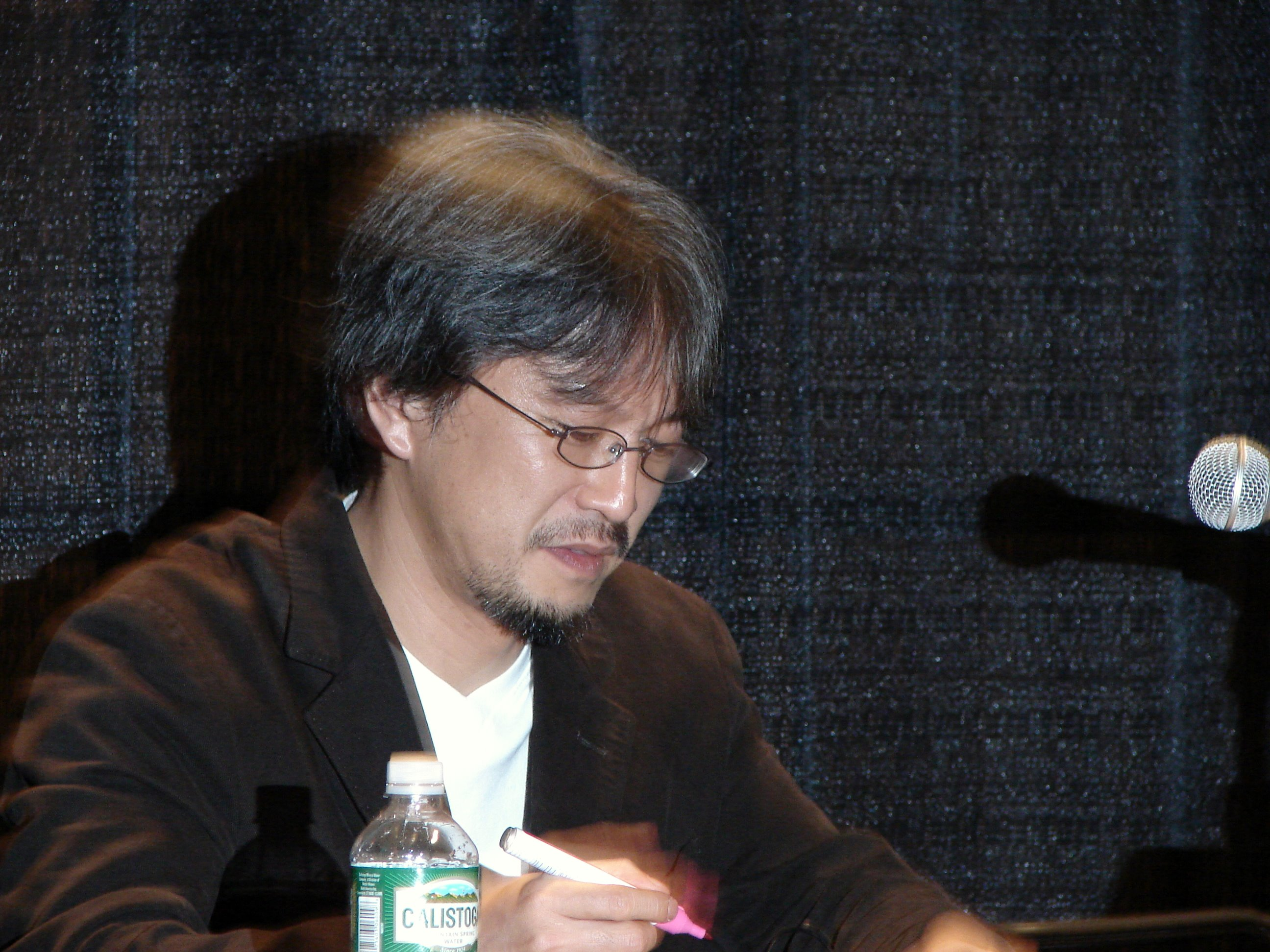
The Legend of Zelda producer Eiji Aonuma speaking at Game Developers Conference, 2007

After Capcom and its scenario writing subsidiary Flagship had finished developing Oracle of Seasons and Oracle of Ages for the Game Boy Color, they began work on a new Zelda game for the Game Boy Advance. Work on the title was suspended to allow the teams to focus on Four Swords, but in February 2003 Shigeru Miyamoto and Eiji Aonuma revealed that development of what would later be called The Minish Cap was "well underway". Nintendo launched a website for The Minish Cap in September 2004, showing concepts of Link's shrinking ability. The game had a cartoonish art style similar to The Wind Waker, as it has a fairy tale setting similar to said game, within "the world of tiny fairies, a universal fairytale story". An effort was made to make Hyrule Town, the overworld's central city hub, feel like a living breathing city with people going about their ordinary lives. This combined with Link's ability to shrink in size allowed for unique angles on the perspective of a "safe town", turning the town itself into a dungeon of sorts for the player. Aonuma was reportedly impressed by what the development team was able to achieve with Hyrule Town, particularly given the restrictions of a 2D game, commenting that it even surpasses Clock Town in Majora's Mask. The game's gust jar was inspired by a gourd that can suck up anything from the novel Journey to the West. Several other aspects of the gameplay were inspired or directly lifted from Four Swords and Four Swords Adventure, both of which Minish Cap serves as a prequel to. For example, the gameplay concept of shrinking to Minish size in The Minish Cap is a fleshed out extension of the function of the Gnat Hat from Four Swords, a hat which allowed Link to shrink in to the size of a gnat.

A first in the Zelda series, the game was released in European territories before North America. The main cited reason for this was the Nintendo DS: with the European DS Launch scheduled for Spring 2005, Nintendo of Europe pushed to make The Minish Cap its handheld Christmas "killer app". Conversely, Nintendo of America held back on its release so not to "cannibalize" the DS market. The game is included in the list of Game Boy Advance games that is now available for download for the Nintendo 3DS's Virtual Console by Nintendo 3DS Ambassadors.

In Europe, the game was available either as a standalone packaged game, or as part of a special pack, which included one of only 25,000 limited edition, Zelda-themed Game Boy Advance SP. The Triforce SP is matte gold in color, with a Triforce logo stamped on the lid, and the Hyrule royal family crest printed on the lower right face. As a launch promotion, Nintendo Europe also produced seven 24-carat gold plated Game Boy Advance SP consoles, with six given away to people who found a golden ticket inside their Triforce SP package, and a seventh as a magazine promotion. Thirty were autographed by Miyamoto himself at the opening of the Nintendo World Store in New York.

== Reception and awards ==
Reception

Aggregate scores
Aggregator	Score
GameRankings	90.36% (67 reviews)
Metacritic	89/100 (56 reviews)

Review scores
Publication	Score
1Up.com	A
AllGame	4.5/5
Edge	8/10
Electronic Gaming Monthly	A+
Game Informer	9.5/10
GamePro	4.6/5
GameSpot	9.1/10
IGN	9/10
Nintendo Life	9/10
X-Play	5/5

Awards
Publication	Award
IGN	20th best GBA game.
GameSpot	Best of 2005–GBA Game of the Year
GameSpy	Editors' Choice; 2005 GBA Game of the Year. 2005 GBA Adventure of the Year.
Nintendo Power	2005 GBA Game of the Year. 24th best game on a Nintendo console.

The Minish Cap was the best-selling game in its debut week in Japan, selling 97,000 copies. It became the 62nd best-selling game of 2004 with 196,477 copies, and had a total of 350,000 copies overall in the country. In North America, The Minish Cap sold 217,000 copies in its debut month of January 2005, being the fourth best-selling game of the month. It remained among the five best-selling games in February and March. The Minish Cap closed the year as the seventh best-selling game of 2005. By March 2005, the game already had sold 1 million units worldwide. In the United States alone, The Minish Cap sold 680,000 copies and earned $21 million by August 2006. During the period between January 2000 and August 2006, it was the 37th highest-selling game launched for the Game Boy Advance, Nintendo DS or PlayStation Portable in that country. The game ended up selling 1.76 million copies worldwide.

The game received critical acclaim. IGN praised the game for continuing the legacy of the successful series, while GameSpot also praised the game for this aspect, saying that "classic Zelda gameplay and flavor will please fans". The graphical style especially—which continues the whimsical style of Wind Waker—was welcomed by most reviewers. The music of the game was commended by most sites; GameSpy stated that "even the music is outstanding, featuring some of the highest quality tunes to ever come out of the GBA's little speakers". Despite the criticism of the dungeon lengths, 1UP.com praised the dungeon design, proclaiming it as superior to that of other Zelda games.

The main criticism of the game among reviewers is the length of the game. Eurogamer says that "it's too short", while RPGamer state that "the typical player can fly through the game's six relatively short dungeons in about ten hours". There are also various other complaints from reviewers: IGN claims that the kinstone system is overly repetitive; Nintendo World Report criticises the game's visuals on a Game Boy Player, and RPGamer details the game's low difficulty level as a disadvantage. Despite this, IGN's Craig Harris liked the way that the ability to become tiny had been incorporated to create fresh puzzles in the Zelda series. He continued to comment that "it's an idea that's so well-conceived that I'd love to see worked in the series' 3D designs somewhere down the line".

The Minish Cap won the 'Best Game Boy Advance of 2005' by GameSpot over such finalists as Fire Emblem: The Sacred Stones and WarioWare: Twisted!; GameSpot labelled it as "the Game Boy Advance game we remember the most". In March 2007, the game was ranked as the 20th best Game Boy Advance game by IGN. In the acknowledgement, IGN commented that "the inclusion of the ability to shrink and grow was explored to some really good results". The game was ranked 47th in Official Nintendo Magazine's "100 Greatest Nintendo Games" feature. The Minish Cap received an average score of 90 percent from GameRankings, a site that compiles media ratings from several publishers to give an average score. During the 9th Annual Interactive Achievement Awards, the Academy of Interactive Arts & Sciences nominated The Minish Cap for "Handheld Game of the Year", which was ultimately awarded to Nintendogs.
