= The Legend of Zelda: A Link to the Past and Four Swords =

2002 video game

- North American box art
- Developers: Nintendo R&D2; Flagship; Grezzo (DSi)
- Publisher: Nintendo
- Directors: Yoichi Yamada; Hidemaro Fujibayashi
- Producers: Takashi Tezuka; Noritaka Funamizu; Katsuhiro Sudo
- Designers: Hidemaro Fujibayashi; Su Chol Lee; Mitsuaki Araki; Joko Kazuki
- Artist: Haruki Suetsugu
- Writer: Kensuke Tanabe
- Composer: Yuko Takehara
- Series: The Legend of Zelda
- Platforms: Game Boy Advance; Nintendo DSi
- Release: December 2, 2002: Game Boy Advance; NA: December 2, 2002; JP: March 14, 2003; EU: March 28, 2003; DSiWare (Four Swords Anniv. Ed.); WW: September 28, 2011
- Genre: Action-adventure
- Modes: Single-player, multiplayer

The Legend of Zelda: A Link to the Past and Four Swords (Note: Known in Japan as Zeruda no Densetsu: Kamigami no Toraifōsu ando Yotsu no Tsurugi (ゼルダの伝説 神々のトライフォース&4つの剣; lit. The Legend of Zelda: Triforce of the Gods & Four Swords).) is a 2002 action-adventure game compilation developed by Nintendo R&D2 and Flagship and published by Nintendo for the Game Boy Advance. The game was released in December 2002 in North America and in March 2003 in Japan and Europe. The cartridge contains a modified port of A Link to the Past, originally released for the Super Nintendo Entertainment System in 1991, and an original multiplayer-only game titled Four Swords, which serves as the ninth installment in The Legend of Zelda series.

A stand-alone port of Four Swords was released for a limited time on Nintendo's DSiWare service as The Legend of Zelda: Four Swords Anniversary Edition (Note: Known in Japan as Zeruda no Densetsu: Yotsu no Tsurugi 25 Shūnen Kinen Edishon (ゼルダの伝説 4つの剣 25周年記念エディション; lit. The Legend of Zelda: Four Swords 25th Anniversary Edition).) on September 28, 2011; this version includes new content, such as a single-player mode and additional areas.

== Gameplay ==
=== A Link to the Past ===
Gameplay of The Legend of Zelda: A Link to the Past. The game has received little modification from the original Super NES version.

=== Four Swords ===
Four Swords is the first Zelda game with a multiplayer element.

Four Swords is the multiplayer portion of the cartridge. Four Swords features gameplay similar to A Link to the Past, with a focus on multiplayer; in it, two to four players must cooperatively work through a series of puzzle-laden dungeons, while competing to collect rupees. The player with the most rupees at the end of a level wins a special prize, though all rupees are shared together in the long run. All players are given respective colors – player one is green, player two is red, player three is blue, and player four is purple. Once all players are connected, player one chooses one of the four stages available to play on. All dungeons are randomized before play. Each dungeon has three levels, with a portal at the end of each level. the first player to reach the portal will be rewarded with a Heart Container, an item that increases the player's health meter. The third level is not a traditional dungeon, but rather, a boss battle. Once the boss is defeated, players will return to the hub area.

Unlike in A Link to the Past, where Link has an inventory of items he has collected, Four Swords only allows a player to have one item at any given time, switching them out at item pedestals. An original item called the Gnat Hat appears, causing Link to shrink and be able to access areas he could not normally reach. This idea was expanded on in the form of a magical talking cap named Ezlo in a later game, The Minish Cap. Creating a file for the Game Boy Advance game will give players a profile in both A Link to the Past and Four Swords. Some features are linked between the two games. For example, when players learn a new sword move, it is transferred between games. When both games are completed, players may access a dungeon called "Palace of the Four Sword" in A Link to the Past.

== Plot ==
=== A Link to the Past ===
The plot of A Link to the Past is the same as the original Super NES version, in which the player assumes the role of Link as he journeys to save Hyrule, defeat the wizard Agahnim and the Demon King Ganon, and claim the Triforce to rescue Princess Zelda and the descendants of the Seven Sages.

=== Four Swords ===
Taking place after the events of The Minish Cap and before the events of Ocarina of Time, the prologue shows Link and Princess Zelda approaching a sword in a pedestal, called the Four Sword. After Zelda explains its history and the evil sorcerer sealed within it, the sorcerer named Vaati breaks free, capturing Zelda to marry her. Link is encountered by three fairies who instruct Link to pull the Four Sword out. Link pulls the Four Sword out, inadvertently creating three copies of himself that fight alongside him. As the game begins, the four Links are tasked with finding three Great Fairies, who together will grant them access to Vaati's palace. After finding the three Great Fairies and entering the palace the four Links battle Vaati. After Vaati is thoroughly weakened, he is trapped in the Four Sword. Link and Zelda return the Four Sword back in its pedestal.

== Development ==
The Legend of Zelda: A Link to the Past & Four Swords was a collaborative development effort between Nintendo and Capcom, the process supervised by Minoru Narita, Yoichi Yamada, Takashi Tezuka and Yoshikazu Yamashita from Nintendo Entertainment Analysis and Development. The A Link to the Past portion re-used the art assets from the Super NES version. Alterations include tweaks to item locations to prevent exploiting the game, a reduction of the viewable playing area, and the inclusion of voice samples from Ocarina of Time. Capcom had begun development of The Minish Cap in 2001, but temporarily suspended it to free up resources for the Four Swords multiplayer component. The company designed the multiplayer portion to force cooperation between players in order to progress. The developers designed the levels to adjust the puzzles to the number of players participating; if two or four players are connected, then a puzzle will require two and four characters, respectively, to complete it. Four Swords differs graphically from the other portion and features a style similar to The Wind Waker, which was released around the same time. Though Four Swords was not initially planned as the first title in a subseries, the story, intended to be the earliest in the series' chronology at the time of its release, was already considered to influence future games.

== Release ==
The game was first revealed at E3 2002 by series developer Shigeru Miyamoto, who demonstrated the multiplayer mode along with Capcom's Yoshiki Okamoto, Namco's Kaneto Shiozawa and Sega's Toshihiro Nagoshi. It was tentatively titled The Legend of Zelda GBA. In January 2003, the game was displayed at the Osaka World Hobby Convention as The Legend of Zelda: A Link to the Past & Four Swords. It was initially released in North America on December 3, 2002, while it was released the next year in Japan and Europe, on March 14 and 28 respectively. Shigeru Miyamoto made a public appearance in London in February 2003, in which he signed Nintendo products and gave away ten signed copies of A Link to the Past & Four Swords a month before it was released in the United Kingdom. Following the Japanese release, Nintendo displayed the game at TV Kumamoto's TKU 15th Day (第15回TKUの日, Dai Juugoe TKU no Hi), an annual event hosted by the Japanese television station in Kumamoto Prefecture. In 2006, it was re-released in Nintendo's second run of Player's Choice titles at a reduced price.

The game was released on the Nintendo Classics service on June 18, 2024.

=== Four Swords Anniversary Edition ===
To celebrate the 25th anniversary of The Legend of Zelda series, Nintendo rereleased The Legend of Zelda: Four Swords Anniversary Edition on DSiWare as a free limited-time only download for the Nintendo DSi and Nintendo 3DS users between September 28, 2011, and February 20, 2012. The game was made available free for a limited time from January 31 to February 2, 2014, in celebration of their then latest released game, A Link Between Worlds.

Developed by Grezzo, this enhanced port of the once multiplayer-only game includes a new single-player mode where players have the ability to control two Links and switch between them to progress through the levels. There are two new areas that can be unlocked: the "Realm of Memories", which features levels resembling those in The Legend of Zelda, A Link to the Past, and Link's Awakening, and the Hero's Trial, which features harder difficulty.

As previously with Ocarina of Time 3D, to promote the game, commercials were made featuring actor and comedian Robin Williams with his daughter Zelda Williams.

== Reception ==
=== Pre-release ===
Nintendo World Report's Max Lake called the announcement of a multiplayer mode "exciting". In IGN's Best of E3 awards for the Game Boy Advance, they named it the runner-up to Best of Show below Metroid Fusion, calling it a "close one", but ultimately gave the award to Fusion due to it not being a remake. They described the multiplayer component as resembling Diablo or Gauntlet. They gave it the award for Biggest Surprise, citing its multiplayer mode, calling it a "brilliant addition" and "well worth the price of four Legend of Zelda cartridges". IGN's Craig Harris, in his preview of the game, called the port of A Link to the Past "faithful". Although he noted that the controls would have to be modified due to the GBA's lack of two buttons that were both used in the Super NES version, he found the new controls to be adequate and praised the visuals for holding up well. IGN reported that based on their then new wishlist tool, A Link to the Past & Four Swords was consistently the second most anticipated Game Boy Advance game for the five weeks before its release.

=== Post-release ===
Reception

Aggregate scores
Aggregator	Score
GameRankings	91.70%
Metacritic	95/100

Review scores
Publication	Score
1Up.com	A
Electronic Gaming Monthly	9.5/10, 9.5/10, 9.5/10
GameSpot	9.2/10
IGN	9.7/10

Since its release, The Legend of Zelda: A Link to the Past & Four Swords has been met with highly positive reception. It holds an aggregate score of 91.70% and 95 at GameRankings and Metacritic respectively, indicating "universal acclaim". It is the highest rated Game Boy Advance game on the sites. The game was a top seller in Japan following its release. It was the second highest title in number of sales the week of its release, and was number six the following week with 0.04 million units. It sold 1.63 million copies in North America as of December 2007, and 0.29 million in Japan as of December 2009. GamePro's Star Dingo called it a "masterpiece", as well as an "important part of the Grand Renaissance of the Second Dimension". He praised the overworld for its secrets and "quirky random characters", adding that playing it required patience and exploring. G4TV praised it for being good for anyone anticipating The Legend of Zelda: The Wind Waker. IGN's Craig Harris praised the game, giving the gameplay and lasting appeal perfect scores. They praised both modes' puzzle designs, calling the Super NES game the best 2D video game ever, while praising the replay value for offering unlockables to keep players playing.

IGN included it in their Game Boy Advance Holiday Buyers Guide for 2002, calling its inclusion of multiplayer a "big deal" and that it was the most requested Super NES port for the Game Boy Advance. IGN named it the third best Game Boy Advance game, praising the Game Boy Advance for handling the game so well, and citing the multiplayer component for making the game "truly awesome". They included it on their list of most-wanted Nintendo DSi Virtual Console games, a hypothetical service that in IGN's view would offer handheld games similar to the Wii's Virtual Console. They once again praised the multiplayer mode, questioning why Nintendo has yet to make a follow-up game on the Nintendo DS or DSiWare. Eurogamer's Tom Bramwell praised it, commenting that the port held up over the years, calling it "amazingly deep" and a "gateway drug into the genre". In reviewing the multiplayer component, he commented that while it was not as good as A Link to the Past, it was still remarkable, but he found fault in the difficulty of finding three other players with Game Boy Advances and copies of the game to play it with.

During the 6th Annual Interactive Achievement Awards, the Academy of Interactive Arts & Sciences nominated A Link to the Past and Four Swords for "Handheld Game of the Year".

=== Audiovisuals ===
GamePro's Star Dingo praised the port of A Link to the Past's ability to retain its visuals. He specifically praised its "clean sprites", calling its overworld a "colorful, happy place", sarcastically calling it "kiddy". Writing for IGN, Craig Harris praised Four Swords' visuals and further called The Legend of Zelda's overture "breathtaking", applauding the Game Boy Advance for recreating the graphics and audio for A Link to the Past from the original Super NES game. He gave praise to the music of the multiplayer mode as well, calling the compositions of A Link to the Past's music superior. Eurogamer's Tom Bramwell commented that while the graphics do not stand up against fellow Game Boy Advance game Golden Sun, they were a better precursor to the then-upcoming The Wind Waker than visuals similar to Ocarina of Time, citing its cartoon lining. He praised it for ensuring that the changes to adjust to the Game Boy Advance's smaller screen were unnoticeable. Dingo called the sound effects "indelible", though he noted that they were "a little dated". Eurogamer's Tom Bramwell criticized the audio, calling the sound tinnier than the Super NES version, and specifically describing Link's voice as "contemptible".

== Legacy ==
Four Swords was followed in 2004 by a GameCube sequel, Four Swords Adventures, which continued the story and expanded upon the gameplay concepts while including a single-player adventure. In 2005, the Four Swords prequel The Minish Cap for the Game Boy Advance became the next handheld Zelda game, also co-developed with Capcom. A sequel was announced for the Nintendo DS entitled The Legend of Zelda: Four Swords DS, but was cancelled and replaced by Phantom Hourglass.
