= The Legend of Zelda: Four Swords Adventures =

2004 video game

- North American box art
- Developer: Nintendo EAD
- Publisher: Nintendo
- Director: Toshiaki Suzuki
- Producers: Shigeru Miyamoto; Eiji Aonuma
- Programmer: Yasunari Soejima
- Artist: Masanao Arimoto
- Writers: Aya Kyogoku; Daiji Imai
- Composers: Koji Kondo; Asuka Ohta
- Series: The Legend of Zelda
- Platform: GameCube
- Release: JP: March 18, 2004; NA: June 7, 2004; EU: January 7, 2005; AU: April 7, 2005
- Genre: Action-adventure
- Modes: Single-player, multiplayer

The Legend of Zelda: Four Swords Adventures (Note: Released as The Legend of Zelda: Four Swords+ (Japanese: ゼルダの伝説 4つの剣+, Hepburn: Zeruda no Densetsu: Yottsu no Tsurugi+) in Japan.) is a 2004 action-adventure game developed and published by Nintendo for the GameCube. It is the eleventh installment in The Legend of Zelda series. It was released in 2004 in Japan on March 18, and in North America on June 7. In 2005, the game was released in Europe on January 7, and in Australia on April 7. The Game Boy Advance handheld game console can be used as a controller when using the GameCube – Game Boy Advance link cable bundled with the game in North America and Europe.

Similar to its predecessor Four Swords in terms of gameplay and presentation, the game takes Link and his three clones created by the magic Four Sword on an adventure to restore peace to Hyrule after learning that an evil counterpart of himself, Shadow Link, has been created. Four Swords Adventures was considered the 48th-best game made for a Nintendo system by Nintendo Power, and received an aggregated 86 out of 100 from Metacritic. It was the third best-selling game of June 2004 in North America, with 155,000 units, and has since sold 250,000 copies; it has sold 127,000 units in Japan.

== Gameplay ==
The main mode of Four Swords Adventures is "Hyrulean Adventure", an episodic cooperative multiplayer adaptation of conventional The Legend of Zelda gameplay. "Shadow Battle" is a competitive multiplayer battle mode. "Navi Trackers", present only in the Japanese version of the game, is a multiplayer stamp rally race.

Screenshot depicting the diamond formation during single-player play

=== Hyrulean Adventure ===
Hyrulean Adventure is the main campaign of Four Swords Adventures, and can be played by one to four players. It consists of eight worlds, each with three stages and a boss battle. The graphics are similar to that of the previously released Four Swords for the Game Boy Advance (GBA), but the maps are static rather than randomly generated, the top-down view is taken from A Link to the Past, and gameplay includes effects from The Wind Waker. The graphics include enhanced atmospheric effects such as cloud shadows that slowly move across the ground, heat shimmer, dust storms, and fog. Music is based on that of A Link to the Past, but is rearranged in places.

In Hyrulean Adventure, most of the same mechanics as Four Swords are used. The multiplayer version requires each player to have a GBA, which is used as a controller and to which the action transfers when that player's character goes off the main screen, but the single-player game may be played with either a GameCube controller or a GBA. There are always four Link characters (differentiated by colors: green, red, blue and purple) in play, regardless of the number of people playing; "extra" Links are attached to those directly controlled and positioned around the controlling character. Normally, the extra Links follow the player, but players can separate an individual Link and control him independently, or put the four Links into formations. These techniques are required to solve puzzles and defeat enemies. Players are encouraged to work together to gather enough Force Gems to empower the Four Sword, and failing to do so by the time the boss is defeated or the dark barrier is reached results in having to go back to the beginning of the stage to collect more. However, once the requisite gems are collected, players are automatically transported to the dark barrier and therefore do not have to repeat the entire stage.

Players can play minigames in multiplayer mode at Tingle's Tower, which appears in every world, to gain extra multiplayer lives. These eight games are earned by playing though certain stages in multiplayer mode. The minigames include horse racing, hammer tag, monster hunting and five others.

=== Shadow Battle ===
Screenshot depicting the GBA-link feature

In Shadow Battle, two or more players battle each other until only one is left standing. Each player uses a different-colored Link character and wields various tools to attack the other Links. Initially, there are five stages which players can choose as the battle's arena. Five bonus maps are unlocked upon completion of Hyrulean Adventure (these "dark stages" are almost the same as the first five maps, but portals to the dark world appear and the player has limited vision). In each stage, items randomly appear, and are usually similar to the items in Hyrulean Adventure. There are many special objects in each stage, which can be used to the player's advantage. There is a time limit; when it reaches zero, the game is tied.

=== Navi Trackers ===
Navi Trackers (formerly planned as a stand-alone game titled Tetra's Trackers) is a game only present in the Japanese version of Four Swords Adventures (Four Swords +). Multiple players use a combination of the television screen and Game Boy Advances to search for members of Tetra's pirate crew to gain as many stamps as possible within a given time limit. Action takes place on the Game Boy Advance used by each player, with the television screen showing a basic map and Tetra narrating the action. A single-player mode is available, which allows players to either collect alone or compete against Tingle.

== Plot ==
=== Setting ===
Four Swords Adventures is the third and last game in the Child Era of the "Victorious Hero" timeline, which takes place centuries after the events of Twilight Princess. The game features a different incarnation of Ganondorf to the one whose backstory is shown in Ocarina of Time, something which is unique to Four Swords Adventures.

=== Story ===
Fearing that Vaati's seal is weakening, which has caused strange happenings through Hyrule, Princess Zelda summons Link as a guard while she and the Shrine Maidens open the portal to the Four Sword Sanctuary. Shadow Link suddenly appears and kidnap the Maidens. Link wields the Four Sword, creating three clones of himself, and inadvertely releases Vaati, wreaking havoc on Hyrule. The four Links then depart to restore peace to Hyrule. The four Links discover that Vaati's release is only a small part in a larger plot to conquer Hyrule, and that the dimension of the Dark World suddenly appears and abducts people, including the four knights of Hyrule, and the castle is taken over.

The four Links discover that Ganon is the cataclyst of the events, after stealing a powerful trident containing dark energy; in a hope to succeed into his plan, Ganon created Shadow Link with the Dark Mirror, who tricked Link into releasing Vaati. With the Dark Mirror, Ganon has abducted people to turn them into his minions. The Links rescue the Maidens, retrieves the Dark Mirror, and defeat Shadow Link. In the Palace of Wind, the four Links defeat both Vaati and Ganon, and use the Shrine Maidens' power to seal the latter. Peace returns into Hyrule as all trace of evil is vanquished for good. Link returns the Four Sword and the four Links become one once again, the Maidens then create a barrier around the Four Sword.

== Development ==
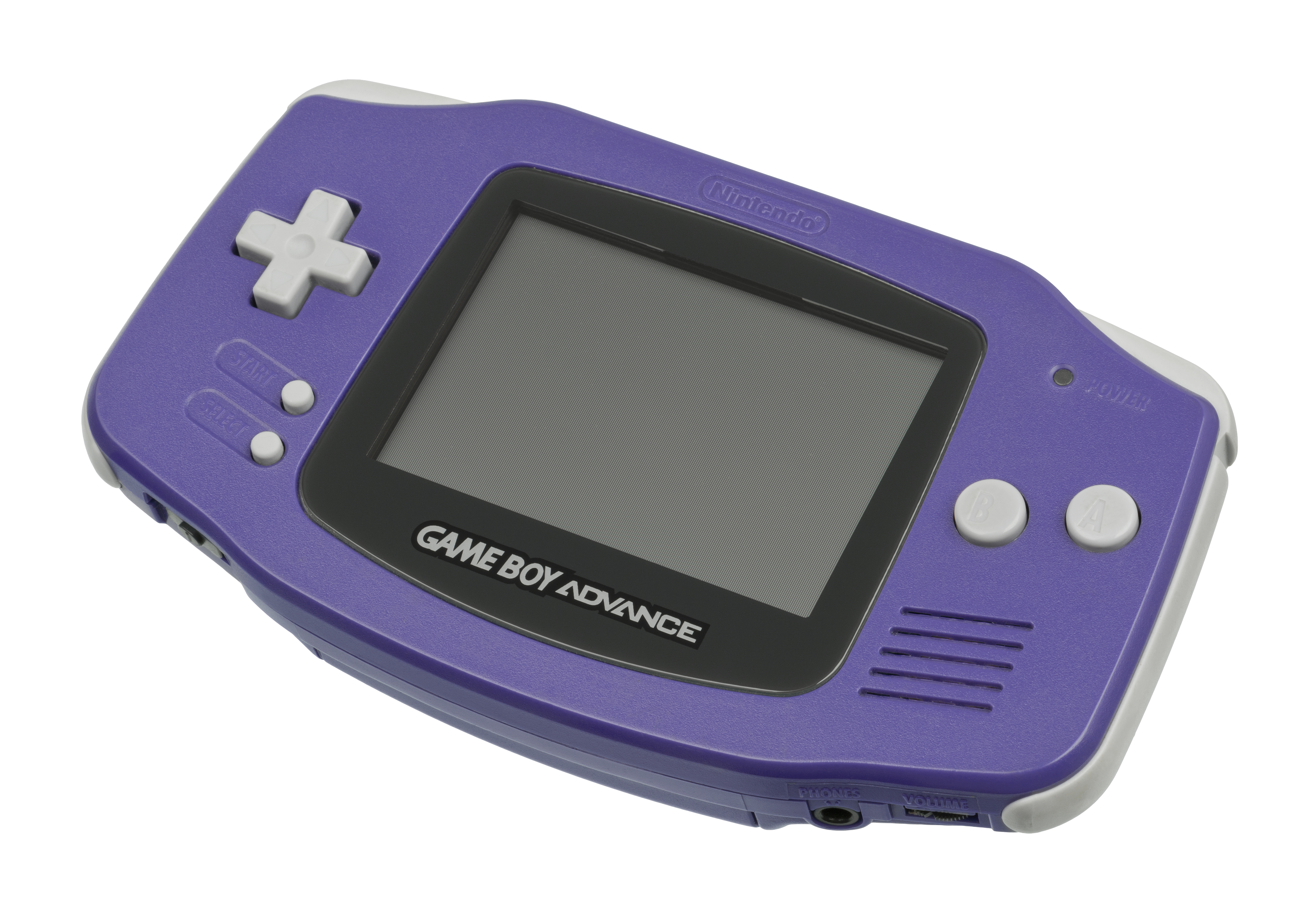
The Legend of Zelda: Four Swords Adventures can be played on a Game Boy Advance.

At E3 2003, Nintendo showcased two Zelda games which would make use of the Game Boy Advance connectivity, Four Swords and Tetra's Trackers. In December of the same year, both games were expected to be together in a single disc, Four Swords +, along with a third, Shadow Battle. Four Swords Adventures was released in Japan with "Hyrule Adventure", "Shadow Battle", and "Navi's Trackers" as three individual games bundled together. In June 2004, however, "Hyrule Adventures" and "Navi's Trackers" were scheduled to be sold as two separate titles in the United States, while the retail status of "Shadow Battle" was still unknown. This decision was later changed to bundle "Hyrule Adventure" with "Shadow Battle", and to not release "Navi's Trackers" in the United States.

Despite the fact that translations for the PAL version were finished in October, the game was not released in Europe until early January 2005. A possible reason for this is so that the game did not compete with The Minish Cap for sales, which in turn was released pre-Christmas in Europe because, unlike North America, it would not cannibalize Nintendo DS sales.

Early on the development of Navi Trackers, it was decided that it would include a speech navigation system that talks and advises the player during mini-games. Players type in their name and the system calls players by their name during the game in order to notify them of their turn.

== Reception ==
Reception

Aggregate scores
Aggregator	Score
GameRankings	85% (67 reviews)
Metacritic	86/100 (55 reviews)

Review scores
Publication	Score
Electronic Gaming Monthly	8.5/10
Eurogamer	8/10
Famitsu	33/40
Game Informer	8/10
GamePro	4/5
GameSpot	8.1/10
GameSpy	4.5/5
IGN	8.7/10
Nintendo Power	4.8/5

In 2006, Nintendo Power rated Four Swords Adventures the 48th best game made on a Nintendo system. It received a score of 86 out of 100 based on 55 aggregated reviews from Metacritic, and an average score of 85% based on 67 reviews from GameRankings.

GameSpot praised the game's connectivity feature with the Game Boy Advance, claiming that this is "a truly compelling reason to invest in a GameCube-to-GBA link cable" and that "using the Game Boy Advance as a controller has an appreciable impact on the experience". They praised the story and said, noting that the differences between the original Four Swords and Adventures is a more persistent narrative. The game was applauded, with critic remarking that Adventures improved on the original Four Swords' visuals, making the Wind Waker-derived visual style more reminiscent of the cel-shaded adventure of Link. The audio was noted, with a review remarking that the sound design for Four Swords Adventures is familiar to anyone who has played any The Legend of Zelda game, including The Wind Waker. GameSpot later named it the best GameCube game of June 2004.

Four Swords Adventures also received criticism. GameRevolution's review about the game was particularly critical of the graphics, calling it an odd mix of cheap 2D SNES sprites and nice GameCube particle effects, believing that it created an inconsistent feel. They also criticized the requirement of the link cable, saying that the required use of the GBA for multiplayer limits the play potential.

Four Swords Adventures was the third best-selling game of June 2004 in North America with 155,000 units, and has since sold 250,000 copies, becoming a part of the Player's Choice line. The game also sold 127,000 units in Japan. Producer Eiji Aonuma felt the game's sales were disappointing due to each player needing a Game Boy Advance and a Link Cable, which made it difficult to convince consumers that they needed to play the game.

== See also ==
- Characters in The Legend of Zelda series
- The Legend of Zelda: A Link to the Past and Four Swords
- The Legend of Zelda: Tri Force Heroes
