= Navi (The Legend of Zelda) =

Fictional character in The Legend of Zelda

- The Legend of Zelda character
- Artwork of Navi in The Legend of Zelda: Ocarina of Time
- First game: The Legend of Zelda: Ocarina of Time (1998)
- Created by: Yoshiaki Koizumi
- Designed by: Yoshiaki Koizumi
- Voiced by: English; Lisa Reimold (2026 remake); Japanese; Kaori Mizuhashi

In-universe information
- Species: Fairy

Navi (Note: Japanese: ナビィ, Hepburn: Nabī) is a fictional fairy who acts as series protagonist Link's navigator throughout the 1998 Nintendo 64 video game The Legend of Zelda: Ocarina of Time. She was voiced by Kaori Mizuhashi in Japanese and Lisa Reimold in English for the 2026 remake. Navi performs a variety of functions within the game, including being a companion and guide to Link, providing the player with advice and being a focal point for the game's Z-lock targeting combat system. Other characters in The Legend of Zelda series have served in similar roles, including Tatl, Midna, and Fi. When designing the reticle for the game, designer Yoshiaki Koizumi made a ball of light with wings, naming it "Fairy Navigation System" before naming it Navi. She is a polarizing character, who has been criticized by players and critics for her repetitive interruptions in gameplay, particularly with the prompt "Hey! Listen!", though others have argued that she was a valuable companion in the game.

== Concept and creation ==
Navi was originally created as a marker for targeting an opponent in battle in The Legend of Zelda: Ocarina of Time. Game designer Yoshiaki Koizumi stated in an interview that he wanted to use something more than a simple triangular marker, so he came up with the idea of a fairy. However, due to the limitations of the Nintendo 64, he created the fairy as a ball of light with wings. He named it the "Fairy Navigation System", which led to the character being named Navi, from "navigation". Coming up with the name helped them come up with other ideas, such as her color changing to indicate the threat level of someone and having her be a story guide. Navi was designed as the focal point of the game's Z-lock targeting system, which gives the player the ability to combat more than one enemy at a time by locking on to them using the Z button. Using this system, Link is able to move freely around the enemy's fixed position, with Navi allowing the camera to follow his movements.

Shigeru Miyamoto explained in a strategy guide published by Japanese magazine Famitsu in April 1999 that Navi had been purposefully designed to provide simple advice, due to limited developer time and manpower. This resulted in Navi repeating the same advice throughout the game, which became the main reason for players branding the character as annoying. Miyamoto also felt that Navi's advice was a major weakness of Ocarina of Time, wanting to remove her altogether, but worrying about turning off fans who may get lost if they return to the game after a period of time and would be lost without her. Various concepts were developed for Ocarina of Time and later abandoned. An old Nintendo 64 demo cartridge holding F-Zero X revealed files for a 1997 Zelda demo build, which featured a magical Soul Medallion that gave Link the ability to "become Navi and fly around". The Great Deku Tree had also been originally intended as a prison for fairies, creating the need for Link to save Navi during the game.

In Ocarina of Time, Navi is voiced by Japanese voice actress Kaori Mizuhashi.

== Appearances ==
Navi first appears in Ocarina of Time, where she is instructed by the Great Deku Tree in Kokiri Forest to assist Link in his quest to stop Ganondorf, which took both of them seven years into the future via time travel. All Kokiri have companion fairies, but because Link is actually a Hylian, he never received one until Navi joins him near the beginning of the events of the game. In gameplay terms, Navi functions primarily as a guide to Link that helps the player learn the controls and advance in the game. Throughout the game, she offers various advice, such as how to use items or defeat enemies, which is repeatedly preceded by various prompts, such as "Hey!" and "Listen!". She can also be used to lock onto enemies as part of the game's Z-targeting system. She is unable to help Link battle against Ganondorf, but is able to return during the final fight in his Ganon transformation. After Link defeats Ganon and returns to the past, Navi flies off, leaving Link behind. This leads to Link traveling into the Lost Woods to look for her in Majora's Mask, which caused him to find himself in the land of Termina, though he is ultimately unable to find her. A fairy named Navi appears in the North American release of the spin-off title Hyrule Warriors, but is named "fairy" in other languages. She appears in other video games, including as part of Young Link's taunt in Super Smash Bros. Ultimate.

The manga adaptation of Ocarina of Time has Navi serve a similar role as the video game, the two of them forming a mutual bond. An official, non-canonical book titled Link and the Portal of Doom also features Navi. The plot takes place after the events of Ocarina of Time and involves Navi helping Link close a portal that threatens Hyrule.

== Reception ==
Navi in Ocarina of Time
Many publications described Navi as annoying for persistently saying "Hey! Listen!"

The character drew a strongly negative response from many critics and players, with GamesRadar+ writer Mikel Reparaz criticizing her habit of saying "Hey!" and "Listen!", with these quotes being noted as often quoted following the game's release to annoy people. The website also listed her "Hey! Listen!" quote as one of the 40 most repeated game quotes. She has generally been regarded as an annoying character, with author Chris Bateman described Navi as the "most famous, and most famously annoying, instance of an explicit funneling companion." Characters have been compared to Navi, either as a positive or negative comparison. These comparisons include Fi, Link's companion and helper from Skyward Sword. Camden Jones of GameRevolution considered Navi to be a symptom of the poor direction and difficulty in navigating Ocarina of Time, feeling that she was there to "patch up the holes" in the game's story by including a character to give Link hints. A source port of Ocarina of Time titled Ship of Harkinian was created, which allows the user to disable Navi's gameplay interruptions.

In the character's defense, Brendan Main, writing for The Escapist, argues that while Navi is undeniably annoying, she is also indispensable in the game and extremely useful, citing her role in the Z-targeting system and her role as a gameplay prompt through physically changing colours near secrets and danger. He even goes as far as claiming that Navi is the greatest partner to grace a videogame. IGN's Chris Reed also stressed her utility, feeling it important to have a character who helps the player get unstuck. Ryan Lambie, writing for Den of Geek, called her a "recognizable and important character in the Zelda canon."

In a 2011 interview with Kotaku, director Eiji Aonuma defended Navi when asked if he finds the character annoying: "Going on an adventure by yourself is lonely and dull. Navi may seem "annoying" at times, but it's hard to imagine Ocarina of Time without communication with Navi, and communication partners like Navi have been employed in different forms in subsequent games in the Zelda series".

=== In popular culture ===
Navi is featured saying her phrase "Hey! Listen!" in a sample at the beginning of "If I Die Tonight" by Japanese rapper Kohh.

Ship Wrek and Zookeepers used the “Hey! Listen!” sound effect in their 2016 track “Ark”, released on NoCopyrightSounds.

Navi’s well known exclamations are also featured throughout UMI’s song “Friendzone”.

== See also ==
- Characters of The Legend of Zelda
