= Yudai =

Yudai may refer to:

- Yudai Township, a township in Wanyuan, Sichuan, China
- Jade Belt Bridge, also known as Yudai Bridge, a bridge in Summer Palace, Beijing, China
- Yūdai, a masculine Japanese given name
- Yudai (kickboxer), Japanese kickboxer, winner of the K-1 Japan U-18 Tournament at K-1 PREMIUM 2007 Dynamite!!
