= Linkle =

Character from The Legend of Zelda

- The Legend of Zelda character
- Linkle, as she appears in Hyrule Warriors
- First game: Hyrule Warriors Legends (2016)
- Designed by: Chris Pranger
- Voiced by: Mikako Komatsu

Linkle (Japanese: リンクル, Hepburn: Rinkuru) is a fictional character who appears in various versions of Hyrule Warriors, a non-canon spin-off title in Nintendo's The Legend of Zelda series, starting with the 2016 Nintendo 3DS release of Hyrule Warriors Legends. She was originally featured in concept art for Hyrule Warriors, and was conceived as Link's sister, though this idea was rejected by The Legend of Zelda designer Eiji Aonuma who felt this conflicted with Link's sister, Aryll, in The Legend of Zelda: The Wind Waker.

The decision to include her in Hyrule Warriors Legends was due to a strong response to the concept art. Reception towards Linkle was generally positive, though it was mixed across different groups. Western fans showed more excitement for her than Japanese fans. There were also disagreements with regard to how Linkle was executed, namely with the concept of a female Link.

== Concept and creation ==
Concept artwork of Linkle wielding a red and silver crossbow was first seen in the official art book for Hyrule Warriors, with a note that a female Link was considered for the game. A later tweet from Hyrule Warriors developer Koei Tecmo's Twitter account pondered whether they should include her due to the attention she received. A trailer for the Nintendo 3DS re-release Hyrule Warriors Legends showed a red-and-silver crossbow, prompting speculation that she would be added in this version. Linkle was officially revealed for Legends in November 2015, complete with attire similar to The Legend of Zelda series protagonist Link.

While Linkle does not have any relation to Link, she was originally meant to be his sister. This was proposed by Hyrule Warriors designers at Koei Tecmo, but The Legend of Zelda franchise designer Eiji Aonuma felt that this conflicted with Link's sister Aryll in The Legend of Zelda: The Wind Waker, who is the only sister he has in the series. Linkle was designed in part to add greater diversity to the game. She is the last character written by Chris Pranger before leaving Nintendo, with Pranger stating that he "wanted her to be special." A scene where Linkle rescues Tingle from Ghirahim was cut from the final game due to the designers feeling like it clashed with Linkle's heroic attributes. When asked if she would appear in future games, Aonuma remarked that they would keep her in mind. She is described as "boundlessly cheerful", kind and naive, and "she always stops to help those in need". She is voiced by Mikako Komatsu.

== Appearances ==
Linkle's only official appearance is as a playable character in the 2016 video game Hyrule Warriors Legends, an expanded re-release of the original Hyrule Warriors, as well as its Nintendo Switch port, Hyrule Warriors: Definitive Edition. Linkle lives in a small village in Hyrule and cares for Cuccos, aspiring to be a hero from her childhood due to a compass from her Grandmother that has been passed down for generations, which she believes proves her hero status. She goes on a quest, though finds herself easily lost. She journeys with other The Legend of Zelda characters, such as Midna, as well as dealing with antagonistic characters like Skull Kid.

== Reception ==
When she originally appeared in concept art for the original Hyrule Warriors, the team received such a strong fan response that it caused her to be added in the 3DS re-release. Upon her reveal, Linkle received an "overwhelmingly positive" response from fans. American fans viewed Linkle as positive representation of women, influenced by what professor Kathryn Hemmann viewed as an openly hostile industry to women, while Japanese fans were not as concerned due to a more open work environment for women. She also discussed Linkle's design, particularly her zettai ryōiki, identifying how this design and Linkle's personality ("optimistic enthusiasm and physical clumsiness") fits the moe aesthetic. Jonathan Holmes of Destructoid noted that reception for her was mixed across different groups, speculating Linkle was meant to appeal to women more.

Maddy Myers of The Mary Sue noted that while she "loves Linkle", she feels that she is not enough, criticizing the designers for not making her Link and feeling that she seemed like a "one-off" and "novelty" made to sell more copies of Hyrule Warriors Legends. Writer Anita Sarkeesian felt that her "cutesy name and appearance" made clear that she was separate from Link, and that this reinforced the idea that male was the default. Vice writer Mike Diver disagreed with the negative sentiment Sarkeesian provided, calling Linkle a "considerable step into the unknown" for Nintendo, hoping that Linkle would appear in Breath of the Wild. Thomas Whitehead of Nintendo Life found her to be a "clumsy introduction to a female Link", but felt that she would open the door for better attempts in the future. Brian Ashcraft of Kotaku enjoyed her depiction, and appreciated that she did not boil down to just being a female Link. He expressed hope that she would appear in canon The Legend of Zelda games.

An unofficial modification of The Legend of Zelda: Breath of the Wild was created that replaced Link with Linkle. This modification adds Linkle's model, as well as new voice acting, facial expressions, and dialogue.
