= Triforce =

Fictional artifact in The Legend of Zelda series

- The Legend of Zelda element
- A depiction of the Triforce as it appears in The Legend of Zelda franchise
- Publisher: Nintendo
- First appearance: The Legend of Zelda (1986)
- Genre: High fantasy action-adventure

In-universe information
- Type: Divine artifact
- Owners: Ganon (Triforce of Power); Zelda (Triforce of Wisdom); Link (Triforce of Courage)
- Function: Grants any wish to its bearer

The Triforce (Japanese: トライフォース, Hepburn: Toraifōsu) is a fictional artifact and icon of Nintendo's The Legend of Zelda video game franchise. It first appeared in the original The Legend of Zelda video game (1986) and has appeared in almost every subsequent game in the series. It consists of three equilateral triangles that are joined to form a large equilateral triangle. In-universe, it represents the essences of the Golden Goddesses—Din, Nayru, and Farore—who created Hyrule. Imbued with divine power, it is capable of granting any wish to anyone who possesses it.

The three pieces of the Triforce are often in the possession of the three main characters of the series, Ganon, Zelda, and Link, who each embody one of its virtues: power, wisdom, and courage. Obtaining the Triforce is a frequent objective in the series, requiring the player to search for its shards and protect it from Ganon, who seeks its power for evil purposes.

The Triforce is a central motif of The Legend of Zelda series, frequently appearing in Zelda iconography and merchandise. It has appeared in related media, including manga, video games, and an animated television series. Due to its prominence and significance within the mythology of the Zelda series, the Triforce has become a widely recognizable symbol in gaming.

== Background ==
The mon of the Hōjō clan, from which the Triforce's design is derived.

Although the Triforce has become associated with The Legend of Zelda series, an identical symbol originated nearly 1,000 years before in medieval Japan. The symbol takes historical reference from the Hōjō clan, a family that took control of Japan in the 13th century. Its emblem (mon) was the mitsuuroko, or "three scales". The symbol also appears frequently in contemporary Japanese culture. It appears on the logos for large and small businesses and can be found on temples and family memorials. Since the release of The Legend of Zelda video game in 1986, the Triforce has become a recognizable icon of The Legend of Zelda series, appearing in every game in some form, particularly as part of the heraldry of the Kingdom of Hyrule.

== Concept and creation ==
Shigeru Miyamoto, creator of The Legend of Zelda series, explained his vision for the first game in an interview with Gamekult. He said that the Triforce fragments were originally supposed to be electronic chips, as the game was intended to be set in both the past and the future. This early futuristic concept was abandoned and replaced by a heroic fantasy. In The Legend of Zelda video game, the Triforce was simply described as magical triangles of great power, but its significance was expanded in subsequent games. The first game established it as an object of desire and a central plot device that binds the three characters. Initially comprising two pieces, the third piece, the Triforce of Courage, was introduced in Zelda II: The Adventure of Link.

== Characteristics ==
The Triforce consists of three equilateral triangles that are joined to create a large equilateral triangle. Its design resembles the Sierpiński triangle. The three pieces are the Triforce of Power, the Triforce of Wisdom, and the Triforce of Courage, which represent the qualities of the Golden Goddesses: Din, the Goddess of Power; Nayru, the Goddess of Wisdom; and Farore, the Goddess of Courage. In the creation myth of the series, they created Hyrule and the Triforce and entrusted both to the Goddess Hylia. As a divine relic infused with the power of the goddesses, the Triforce is an object of limitless power, capable of granting any wish to anyone who touches it. Its place of origin is known as the Sacred Realm.

The Triforce can only be wielded by someone who possesses a balance of the three virtues in their heart: power, wisdom, and courage. Conversely, if held by someone with an imbalanced heart, it splits into three pieces, with each piece bestowed on a person who represents that quality. The three virtues of the Triforce are often distributed amongst the series' three main characters: Ganon, Princess Zelda, and Link. In some Zelda games, it manifests as a symbol on the hand of the bearer of one of the pieces. The trinity within the Triforce creates a moral balance, with evil seeking power, and wisdom and courage being the opposing forces for good. A recurring theme of the series is Ganon's plan to steal the Triforce from the Sacred Realm in order to use its power to conquer Hyrule, which is ultimately thwarted by Link and Zelda. This places the three characters in an endless battle that is repeated across the fictional timeline within a reincarnation cycle.

== Appearances ==
=== The Legend of Zelda series ===
Link holds the Hylian Shield in The Legend of Zelda: Skyward Sword. The Triforce is set above the Crimson Loftwing in the Hyrule Royal Crest.

The Triforce is a common symbol found in the series. It is connected with the Royal Family of Hyrule and displayed as part of the Hyrule Royal Family's signature crest, which combines the Triforce with a fictional bird called a Crimson Loftwing. It is also found on various objects within the games such as the Master Sword and the Hylian Shield and on sacred sites, such as the Temple of Time.

In 1986, the original The Legend of Zelda video game introduced the Triforce, which consisted of two pieces, as a central plot device. It involves the hero, Link, embarking on a quest to save Hyrule from the evil Ganon, who has stolen the Triforce of Power. After Princess Zelda splits the Triforce of Wisdom into eight fragments and scatters them across the land, Link must search for the fragments and reassemble them to rescue Princess Zelda and defeat Ganon.

Zelda II: The Adventure of Link (1987) established the Triforce of Courage as the third piece of the Triforce. The game's instruction manual tells the backstory of Princess Zelda being placed in a magical sleep by a wizard and sets Link's fate as the hero who will wake her by marking the back of his hand with the Triforce. The story involves Link obtaining six crystals and then claiming the Triforce of Courage from the Great Palace. Using the three pieces of the Triforce, he is able to awaken sleeping Zelda from her curse.

The third game in the series titled A Link to the Past (1991) introduces a detailed fictional lore for the Triforce. In Japan, it was released with the title Triforce of the Gods. The game's instruction booklet provides the creation myth explaining how three Golden Goddesses named Din, Nayru, and Farore descended to create the land of Hyrule and then created the Triforce and imbued it with the essence of their power. In the game's backstory, Ganon enters the Sacred Realm to steal the Triforce and plunges it into darkness, creating the Dark World. To prevent Ganon from escaping and destroying the Light World, Link saves Zelda and the Sages. In the final scenes, he uses the Triforce to wish for the characters in the game to be restored.

Ganon, in his humanoid form of Ganondorf, pursues his goal of obtaining the Triforce in Ocarina of Time (1998). Ganondorf manages to gain entry to the Sacred Realm and takes over Hyrule, plunging it into chaos. After a seven-year sleep, Link awakens as an adult and sets off to protect the Triforce from Ganondorf by travelling back and forth in time. With the help of adult Zelda and the Sages, he successfully defeats Ganondorf by sealing him in the Sacred Realm, now the Evil Realm. The game established the trinity of the characters each embodying one of the virtues of the Triforce.

When the game duo titled The Legend of Zelda: Oracle of Seasons and Oracle of Ages (2001) were conceived, they were originally intended to be a trilogy, with each story centred on one of the three virtues of the Triforce. In each game the Triforce initiates the adventure by summoning Link and transporting him to the worlds of Holodrum and Labrynna to collect eight Essences of Nature or Time in order to defeat the games' villains, Onox and Veran.

In The Wind Waker (2002), Link must collect eight pieces of the Triforce of Courage, which are scattered across the islands on the map, before he is ready to confront Ganondorf. The Triforce hunt, which was described by GameSpot as "infamous", is a lengthy process involving finding the chart locations, returning to Tingle and then finding the Triforce of Courage shards. Due to the tedious nature of the task, it was later simplified in The Wind Waker HD. In the finale, Ganondorf unites the Triforce, but before he can make his wish to bring Hyrule back to the surface, the last King of Hyrule's spirit touches it and wishes to wash Ganondorf and Hyrule away, resulting in a final battle pitting Link and Zelda against Ganondorf.

The Triforce does not play a major role in Twilight Princess (2006). At the beginning of the game, each of the three main characters is shown to be in possession of their individual component by glowing triangles that appear on their hands, but otherwise the Triforce only appears on murals and buildings.

Skyward Sword (2011) again focuses on the creation of the Triforce by the three Goddesses. In the game's backstory, demonic creatures rise from cracks in the earth led by Demon King Demise with the intention of claiming the Triforce. To protect it, the goddess Hylia commands an army of the world's people to fight Demise. She seals him away and after becoming mortal, sends the humans to live above the surface world in Skyloft. She hides the Triforce in the sky to await the hero, Link, who recovers the three Triforce pieces from the Sky Keep and uses its powers to defeat Demise.

In A Link Between Worlds (2013), another version of the Triforce was introduced in the fictional universe. In Japan, the game is known as Triforce of the Gods 2, as it is a spiritual sequel to A Link to the Past. It takes place in two mirrored worlds, the Light World (Hyrule) and the Dark World (Lorule). Unlike Hyrule, Lorule has crumbled, caused by its people destroying its own Triforce, due to it being the cause of war. To save her world, Princess Hilda plots to steal Hyrule's Triforce. By the end of the game, she sympathises with Hyrule and allows Link and Zelda to return there with their Triforce. In an act of compassion, the two use the Hyrulean Triforce to recreate Lorule's Triforce.

Nintendo published Tri Force Heroes (2015) for the 3DS, a cooperative multiplayer game involving three Links dressed in red, blue and green. Hiromasa Shikata, the game's director, explained that the concept for the game was a "triangular relationship between three players".

Despite its prominence in the Zelda series, the Triforce plays no part in the storyline of Breath of the Wild (2017). It appears in various places within the game and manifests itself on the hand of Zelda in the battle against Calamity Ganon. The three virtues of the Triforce are present in the form of three springs located in different regions of the map, namely the Spring of Power, the Spring of Wisdom, and the Spring of Courage. The Triforce continued to be absent from the series as a plot device with the release of Tears of the Kingdom (2023), although it appears on in-game architecture and as a tattoo on the arm of the character Sonia. This led to speculation amongst players that it has been abandoned as a major element of the series.

In Echoes of Wisdom (2024), the Triforce appears again but is described as "Prime Energy". In a Famitsu interview, Aonuma explained that he decided to "bring out the Triforce" because it was necessary for the story. The development team knew that the game would end with obtaining the Triforce but felt that its image was too strong. For this reason, they set the story in an undefined time period to give the impression that the inhabitants had forgotten the Triforce and had only a vague idea of its existence.

=== Television series ===
In The Legend of Zelda animated series the Triforce consists of two pieces, with Ganon possessing the Triforce of Power and Zelda possessing the Triforce of Wisdom. The plot of each episode revolves around Ganon's attempts to gain control of both Triforce pieces so that he can become the ruler of Hyrule. The series gave the Wisdom and Power pieces a voice and a role in the story. Phil Harnage, one of the show's writers explained that this dialogue was used to explain the show's events. The cartoon's voice cast included Elizabeth Hanna as the Triforce of Wisdom and Allen Stewart-Coates as the Triforce of Power.

=== Manga and comics ===
Following the release of The Legend of Zelda video game, a companion manga book titled The Hyrule Fantasy was released in Japan by Wanpaku Comics in September 1986. It follows the game's story, involving the eight fragments of the Triforce. In 1992, a Choose Your Own Adventure-style book was released in Japanese titled The Legend of Zelda: The Triforce of the Gods. It was based on A Link to the Past, though some story elements deviated from the game. Two manga adaptations of A Link to the Past were also published by Ataru Cagiva in 1995 and Akira Himekawa in 2005 with the Japanese title Triforce of the Gods. Akira Himekawa also produced a manga book published by Viz Media, which is based on Ocarina of Time and follows the game's plot involving Link's quest to protect the Triforce from Ganondorf. In the early 1990s, Valiant Comics published The Legend of Zelda comic book based on the animated series. In the third issue, Link is corrupted by the Triforce of Power and attacks Zelda to obtain the Triforce of Wisdom. In the fifth issue, the second storyline is titled "The Day of the Triforce", which involves Link battling without his Triforce power due to its disappearance.

=== Video games ===
The Triforce has appeared in various other video games. In the series spin-off hack and slash video game Hyrule Warriors (2014), the Triforce is the objective for one of the main antagonists, Cia. Originally a guardian of the Triforce, she is corrupted by Ganon after displaying affections for Link and builds an army to obtain the Triforce. It also appears in the Super Smash Bros. series. In Super Smash Bros. Brawl, Link uses the Triforce in his Final Smash. In Super Smash Bros for Nintendo 3DS and Wii U, Link's and Toon Link's final smash is the Triforce Slash, which traps enemies in the Triforce before relentlessly slashing at them. In Super Smash Bros. Ultimate, the Triforce Slash appears in Toon Link's and Young Link's "Final Smash" attack. In the same game, Zelda uses the Triforce of Wisdom as her Final Smash, which produces a glowing triangle that sucks in opponents and deals damage. In Sonic Lost World's The Legend of Zelda DLC stage, Sonic the Hedgehog travels through Hyrule in search of the Triforce. In Mario Kart 8's The Legend of Zelda × Mario Kart 8 expansion pack and its enhanced Nintendo Switch port, one of the grand prix cups is known as the "Triforce Cup" with custom vehicle parts including the Triforce Tires. The Triforce was used in Splatoon 3 by Nintendo to promote Tears of the Kingdom prior to its release in May 2023. In the Triforce Splatfest, players were asked to choose Power, Wisdom or Courage as their team. The Tricolor Turf War was fought on a triangular map to represent the shape of the Triforce.

=== Other media ===
In 2017, Nintendo rolled out an escape room experience across eight cities in North America titled "Defenders of the Triforce".

"Triforce" is also a name given to an arcade board system that was a joint venture from three companies; Namco, Nintendo and Sega using a combination of Nintendo GameCube and Sega GD-ROM hardware inside a Namco cabinet.

=== In popular culture ===
The Triforce has been used as a shibboleth and a meme to embarrass newer users of the imageboard website 4chan. Experienced users write it using Unicode characters, but copying and pasting the Triforce results in the symbol becoming misaligned.

Due to its simple design and popularity with gamers, the Triforce has become one of the most popular gaming tattoos. Professional wrestler Cody Rhodes, a longtime Legend of Zelda fan, formerly had the Triforce on his wrestling boots in his early career with the WWE.

The Triforce has inspired the production of Zelda-themed products, including a beer named Triforce IPA.

In 2023, the British metal band DragonForce released a single titled "Power of the Triforce", which is a tribute to The Legend of Zelda series.

== Merchandise ==
The Triforce regularly appears on official Zelda merchandise, including clothing and accessories. It is prominently displayed on the cover of The Legend of Zelda Encyclopedia, which is published by Dark Horse. In 2023, it was recreated as a logic puzzle for Nintendo by a Japanese toy manufacturer. Images of the Triforce appear on a set of official t-shirts that were released for the Triforce-themed Splatfest.

== Reception ==
The Triforce has become a recognisable icon of The Legend of Zelda series. It has been carved into headstones and used as a family crest. Brian Ashcraft of Kotaku commented that, although the inspiration for the Triforce is unknown, the symbol is found on the grave of Japanese video game designer Gunpei Yokoi, creator of the Game Boy, as his family crest or "kamon" (家紋). Florent Gorges, author of The History of Nintendo, opined that the symbol is so ubiquitous in Japan that Yokoi's protégé, Shigeru Miyamoto, could not have ignored it and had reused the design for the Zelda series. Ashcraft also remarked that the Triforce had such an impact on the younger Japanese generation, that the crest is now widely recognised, not as the mitsuuroko symbol, but as the icon of The Legend of Zelda series. In 1999, the Triforce in Ocarina of Time became the centre of a hoax, where a user account successfully convinced the Zelda fandom that the Triforce could be acquired, by posting a series of fake hints that were eventually debunked. Kotaku described it as "one of the greatest hoaxes in video game history". In 2016, Kate Gray of TechRadar noted that players persisted in their search for the Triforce in Ocarina of Time, using various methods of play in the hope of recovering it.

Stephen Totilo, writing for Kotaku, highlighted that in 2016 Zelda series producer Eiji Aonuma used the Triforce to reinforce the fixed gender roles of the three main characters in the series. Aonuma stated that the concept of creating a female version of Link, "would mess with the balance of the Triforce" and had been rejected by Nintendo for that reason. Jacob Kastrenakes of The Verge strongly disagreed by commenting that, although the three characters possess and embody the three virtues of the Triforce, the pieces could "theoretically be held by others in Hyrule" and that none of the Triforce pieces relate to gender.

The Triforce has been the subject of interpretation with regards to its significance within the Zelda series. Luke Cuddy considered that the Triforce can be interpreted as a lesson in morality that can be applied in the real world, as each of the three Triforce pieces is equal and could be used by the three main characters for good or evil, depending on how they choose to act. Anthony Bean opined that the Triforce is a symbol of the self in Jungian psychology, because it "serves as a connection between Hyrule (the conscious, mortal realm) and the goddesses (the unconscious, divine realm) just as the self serves as a meeting point for the ego and the unconscious". Edge staff commented that the Triforce is the deus ex machina of The Legend of Zelda series, stating that, of all the world-saving devices in gaming, it is "the most visually iconic and symbolically potent one" and noted its Christian similarities: "salvation through a trinity that is also one".

Luke Plunkett of Kotaku opined that the Triforce is "one of the most iconic designs in the history of video games" and "the object that lies at the heart of The Legend of Zelda". Eurogamer staff commented that the Triforce symbolises "Zelda's perpetually cycling legend" and is the blueprint for every game in the series, with Link representing "agency, curiosity, the eternal innocence", Ganon representing "selfishness, megalomania, destruction" and Zelda representing "insight and direction". Nicole Carpenter for Polygon commented that the Triforce has become a ubiquitous symbol that is widely recognised amongst gamers. She highlighted that it creates a sense of community for many isolated gamers and also provides personal significance to those who find comfort and meaning in its symbolism.

== See also ==
- Universe of The Legend of Zelda
- Sierpiński triangle
