= Nagano (surname) =

- Language: Japanese

Other names
- Variant forms: 永野; 長野

Nagano (永野, 長野) is a Japanese surname.

== Notable people ==
- Fuka Nagano (長野 風花; born 1999), Japanese women's footballer
- Hideki Nagano (永野 英樹; born 1968), Japanese classical pianist
- Hiroshi Nagano (長野 博; born 1972), singer and actor, member of V6
- Kent Nagano (born 1951), American orchestral conductor
- Makoto Nagano (長野 誠; born 1972), Japanese fisherman
- Mamoru Nagano (永野 護; born 1960), Japanese manga artist
- Mei Nagano (永野 芽郁; born 1999), Japanese actress
- Osami Nagano (永野 修身; 1880–1947), Imperial Japanese Navy admiral
- S. Nagano (長野 S), one of the two manga artists under the pen name Akira Himekawa (姫川 明輝)
- Serina Nagano (長野 せりな; born 1994), Japanese Idol, member of Idoling
- Shigeichi Nagano (長野 重一; 1925–2019), Japanese photographer
- Shoki Nagano (長野 星輝; born 2002), Japanese footballer
- Takeshi Nagano (永野健; born 1985), Japanese volleyball player
- Yudai Nagano (disambiguation), multiple people
- Yukimi Nagano (born 1982), Swedish singer
