= Nagano =

Nagano may refer to:

== Places ==
- Nagano Prefecture, a prefecture in Japan
  - Nagano (city), the capital city of the same prefecture
    - Nagano 1998, the 1998 Winter Olympics
- Nagano Station, a railway station in Nagano, Japan

== People ==
- Nagano (surname), list of people with the surname Nagano
- nagano (illustrator), illustrator and author who created the Chiikawa series
