= The Legend of Zelda (disambiguation) =

The Legend of Zelda is a series of video games by Nintendo.

The Legend of Zelda may also refer to:

- The Legend of Zelda (video game), a 1986 game for the Nintendo Entertainment System and the first entry in the series
- The Legend of Zelda (manga), comics based on the franchise
- The Legend of Zelda, an animated segment from The Super Mario Bros. Super Show!
- The Legend of Zelda (film), an upcoming film from Sony Pictures
