= The Legend of Zelda: Twilight Princess =

2006 video game

- Developer: Nintendo EAD (Note: Nvidia Lightspeed Studios developed the Nvidia Shield version. Twilight Princess HD was developed by Tantalus Media and Nintendo EPD.)
- Publisher: Nintendo
- Director: Eiji Aonuma
- Producer: Shigeru Miyamoto
- Artists: Yusuke Nakano; Satoru Takizawa
- Writers: Aya Kyogoku; Takayuki Ikkaku; Mitsuhiro Takano; Eiji Aonuma
- Composers: Toru Minegishi; Asuka Ota
- Series: The Legend of Zelda
- Platforms: Wii; GameCube; Wii U; Nvidia Shield TV
- Release: November 19, 2006: Wii; NA: November 19, 2006; JP: December 2, 2006; AU: December 7, 2006; EU: December 8, 2006 GameCube; JP: December 2, 2006; NA: December 11, 2006; EU: December 15, 2006; AU: December 19, 2006 Wii U; NA/EU: March 4, 2016; AU: March 5, 2016; JP: March 10, 2016 Nvidia Shield TV; CHN: December 5, 2017
- Genre: Action-adventure
- Mode: Single-player

The Legend of Zelda: Twilight Princess (Note: Japanese: ゼルダの伝説 トワイライトプリンセス, Hepburn: Zeruda no Densetsu: Towairaito Purinsesu) is a 2006 action-adventure game developed and published by Nintendo for the GameCube and Wii. Originally planned for release exclusively on the GameCube in November 2005, Nintendo delayed the release to refine the game, add more content and port it to the Wii. The Wii version was a launch game in North America in November 2006 and in Japan, Europe and Australia the following month. The GameCube version was released in December 2006 as the final first-party game for the console. (Note: Aonuma 2007, Eiji Aonuma's GDC 2007 Presentation)

The game takes place over a century after Majora's Mask, in an alternate timeline from The Wind Waker. Players control Link, who tries to prevent Hyrule from being engulfed by a corrupted parallel dimension, the Twilight Realm. He takes the form of both a Hylian and a wolf and is assisted by a mysterious imp named Midna.

Twilight Princess received critical acclaim, with praise for its art direction, combat, level design and story. It received numerous game of the year awards, and has been called one of the greatest video games ever made. By 2015, it had sold 8.85 million copies worldwide, making it the best-selling Zelda game until Breath of the Wild (2017). In 2011, the Wii version was rereleased under the Nintendo Selects label. A high-definition remaster based on the GameCube version, The Legend of Zelda: Twilight Princess HD, developed by Tantalus Media and Nintendo EPD, was released for the Wii U in March 2016. An eleven-volume manga series based on Twilight Princess by Akira Himekawa was published between 2016 and 2022.

== Gameplay ==
An arrow points at an enemy whom Link is targeting as he prepares to swing his sword (GameCube version).

The Legend of Zelda: Twilight Princess is an action-adventure game focused on combat, exploration and puzzle-solving. It uses the basic control scheme introduced in Ocarina of Time, including context-sensitive action buttons and L-targeting (Z-targeting on the Wii), a system that allows the player to keep Link's view focused on an enemy or important object while moving and attacking. Link can walk, run and attack and he will automatically jump when running off of or reaching for a ledge. Link uses a sword and shield in combat, complemented with secondary weapons and items, including a bow and arrows, a boomerang and bombs. While L-targeting, projectile-based weapons can be fired at a target without the need for manual aiming.

The context-sensitive button mechanic allows one button to serve a variety of functions, such as talking, opening doors and pushing, pulling and throwing objects. The on-screen display shows what action, if any, the button will trigger, determined by the situation. For example, if Link is holding a rock, the context-sensitive button will cause Link to throw the rock if he is moving or targeting an object or enemy or place the rock on the ground if he is standing still.

The GameCube and Wii versions feature several minor differences in their controls and gameplay. The Wii version uses the motion sensors and built-in speaker of the Wii Remote. The speaker emits the sounds of a bowstring when shooting an arrow, Midna's laugh when she gives advice to Link, and the series' trademark "chime" when discovering secrets. The player controls Link's sword by swinging the Wii Remote. Other attacks are triggered using similar gestures with the Nunchuk. In the GameCube version, players can control the camera freely, without entering a special "lookaround" mode required on the Wii; however, in the GameCube version, only two of Link's secondary weapons can be equipped at a time, as opposed to four in the Wii version. (Note: Pelland 2006, p. 168)

The game features nine dungeons—large, contained areas where Link battles enemies, collects items and solves puzzles. Link navigates these dungeons and fights a boss at the end in order to obtain an item or otherwise advance the plot. The dungeons are connected by a large overworld, across which Link can travel on foot; on his horse, Epona; or by teleporting with Midna's assistance.

When Link enters the Twilight Realm, the void that corrupts parts of Hyrule, he transforms into a wolf. He is eventually able to transform between his Hylian and wolf forms at will. As a wolf, Link loses the ability to use his sword, shield, or any secondary items; he instead attacks by biting and defends primarily by dodging attacks. "Wolf Link" gains several key advantages in return—he moves faster than he does on foot as a human, digs holes to create new passages, and uncover buried items, and has improved senses, including the ability to follow scent trails. On his back, he also carries Midna, a small imp-like creature who gives him hints, uses an energy field to attack enemies, helps him jump long distances and eventually allows him to "warp" to any of several preset locations throughout the overworld. Using Link's wolf senses, the player can see and listen to the wandering spirits of those affected by the Twilight, as well as hunt for enemy ghosts named Poes. (Note: Pelland 2006, p. 153)

The artificial intelligence of enemies in Twilight Princess is more advanced than that of enemies in The Wind Waker. Enemies react to defeated companions and to arrows or slingshot pellets that pass by, and they can detect Link from a greater distance than was possible in previous games.

== Story ==
=== Setup ===
Twilight Princess is set over a century after the events of Majora's Mask. It is the second game in the Child Era of the "Victorious Hero" timeline that connects to an alternate reality scenario where the Hero of Time successfully defeats Ganondorf in Ocarina of Time and returns to his childhood to use the wisdom he has gained to warn young Zelda of the horrifying fate of Hyrule.

=== Plot ===
A young adult named Link works as a ranch hand in Ordon Village. One day, Bulblins take away the village's children. Link pursues and encounters a wall of Twilight. A Twilight monster pulls him beyond the wall into the Twilight-shrouded forest, where he is transformed into a wolf and imprisoned. Link is soon freed by an imp named Midna, who offers to help him if he obeys her unconditionally. She guides him to Princess Zelda, who explains that Zant, the usurper king of the Twili, invaded Hyrule Castle and forced her to surrender. The kingdom became enveloped in Twilight, turning all its inhabitants besides Link and Zelda into invisible spirits. To save Hyrule, Link, aided by Midna, must first revive the Light Spirits by entering the Twilight-covered regions and recovering the Spirits' light from the Twilight beings that have stolen it. Once revitalized, each Spirit returns Link to his Hylian form and informs Link and Midna of the hidden location of a Fused Shadow, one of the fragments of a powerful relic that will have to be used to match Zant's power to defeat him.

During his journey, Link finds Ordon Village's children and assists the monkeys of Faron, the Gorons of Eldin, and the Zoras of Lanayru. After restoring the Light Spirits and obtaining the Fused Shadows, Link and Midna are ambushed by Zant, who takes away the fragments and reveals that his power comes from another source, which he uses to trap Link in his wolf state. Failing to persuade Midna into joining forces with him, Zant attempts to dispose of her by exposing her to the light of Lanayru's light spirit. Bringing a dying Midna to Zelda, Link learns from her that he needs the Master Sword to remove Zant's curse. She proceeds to sacrifice herself to heal Midna, vanishing mysteriously. Moved by Zelda's act of selflessness, Midna starts to care more about Link and the fate of his world.

After gaining the Master Sword, Link is cleansed of the curse that kept him in wolf form. Deep within the Gerudo Desert, Link and Midna search for the Mirror of Twilight, the only known gateway between Hyrule and the Twilight Realm, but discover that it is broken. The Sages there explain that Zant tried to destroy it, but only managed to shatter it into fragments; only the true ruler of the Twili can completely destroy the mirror. They also relate that they once used it to banish Ganondorf, the king of the Gerudo who attempted to steal the Triforce, to the Twilight Realm after failing to execute him. Link and Midna set out to retrieve the missing shards of the mirror. Once it has been fully restored, the Sages reveal to Link that Midna is actually the true ruler of the Twili, usurped and cursed into her current form by Zant. Confronting Zant, Link and Midna learn that he forged a pact with Ganondorf, who asked for his assistance in subjugating Hyrule. After Link defeats Zant, Midna recovers the Fused Shadows and kills Zant after learning that only Ganondorf's defeat can release her from her curse.

Returning to Hyrule, Link and Midna find Ganondorf in Hyrule Castle, with a lifeless Zelda suspended above him. Ganondorf fights Link by possessing Zelda and then transforming into a gigantic boar-like beast known as Dark Beast Ganon, but Link defeats him by using his wolf form and the power that Midna received from Zelda is able to resuscitate her. Ganondorf revives and Midna teleports Link and Zelda outside the castle so she can hold him off with the Fused Shadows. However, as Hyrule Castle collapses, Ganondorf emerges victorious from it, crushing the Fused Shadow piece that Midna wore on her head, and pursues Link on horseback. Assisted by Zelda and the Light Spirits, Link eventually knocks Ganondorf off his horse, before dueling him sword to sword on foot and eventually running the Master Sword through Ganondorf's chest. With Ganondorf dead, the Light Spirits revive Midna and restore her to her true form. After bidding farewell to Link and Zelda, Midna returns home and destroys the Mirror of Twilight, ultimately severing the bond between Hyrule and the Twilight Realm. As Hyrule Castle is rebuilt, Link leaves Ordon Village, heading to parts unknown.

== Development ==
=== Inception as a GameCube game ===
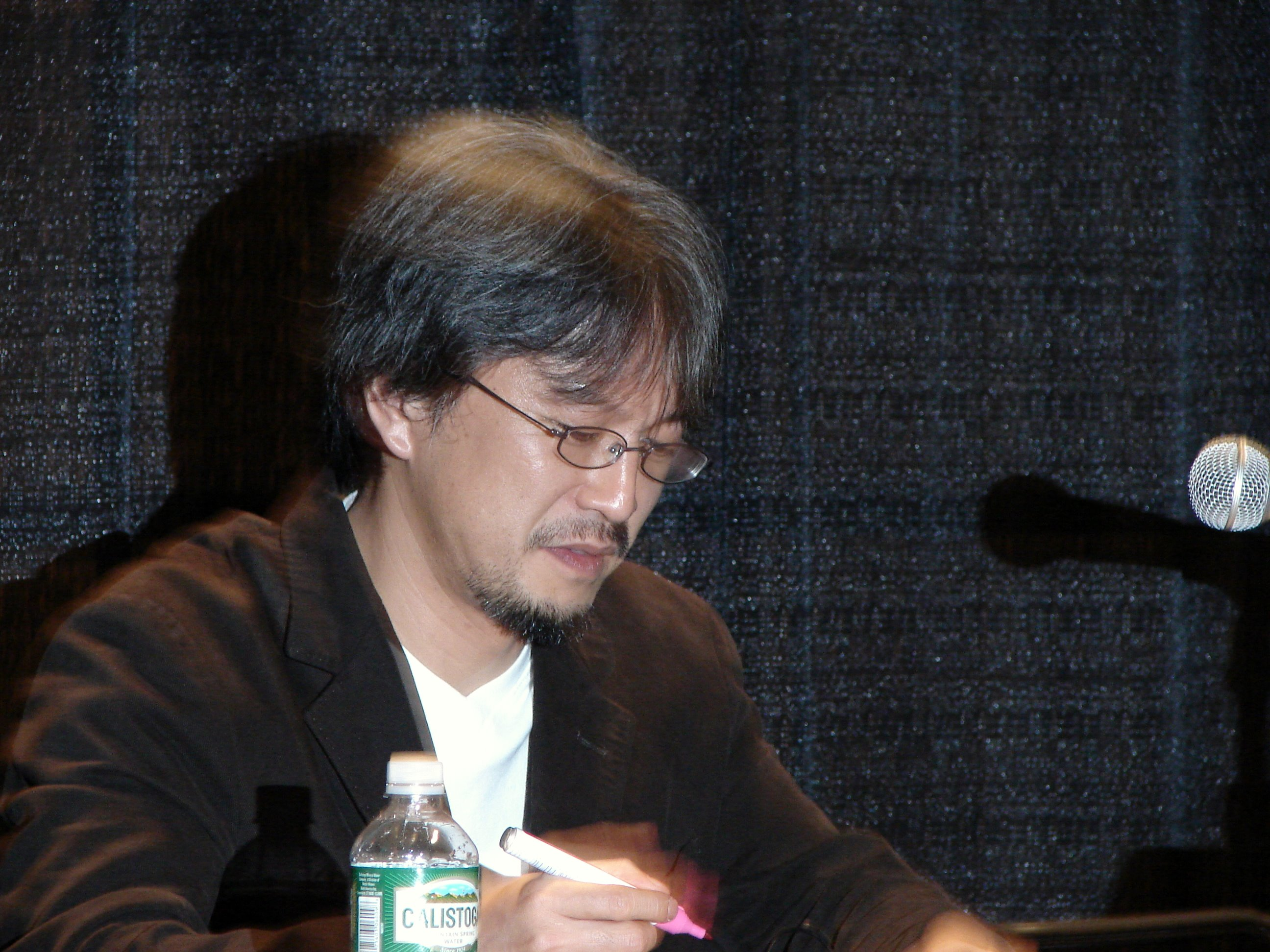
Eiji Aonuma, the director of Twilight Princess, at the 2007 Game Developers Conference

In 2003, Nintendo announced a new Zelda game for the GameCube by the same team that had created the cel-shaded The Wind Waker. At the following year's Game Developers Conference, director Eiji Aonuma unintentionally revealed that it was in development under the working title The Wind Waker 2, with a similar graphical style. Nintendo of America told Aonuma that North American sales of The Wind Waker were sluggish because its cartoon appearance created the impression that it was designed for a young audience. (Note: Aonuma 2007, The fate of Wind Waker 2) Aonuma expressed to producer Shigeru Miyamoto that he wanted to create a realistic Zelda game that would appeal to the North American market and meet Miyamoto's original vision of realism for the series. Miyamoto, hesitant about solely changing the presentation, suggested the team should focus on gameplay innovations. He advised that Aonuma should start by doing what could not be done in Ocarina of Time, particularly horseback combat. Early development of what would become Twilight Princess began and special care was taken to improve the realism of the horseriding, with lead character designer Keisuke Nishimori riding a horse for himself to feel what it was like.

Just as the original Legend of Zelda was inspired by J. R. R. Tolkien's The Lord of the Rings novels, the aesthetic of Twilight Princess was inspired by the Lord of the Rings films, as they had just come out and were generally well received at the time. It was developed with a large world in mind, whose scale was to meet the expectation for fantasy worlds that audiences had become accustomed to with The Lord of the Rings.

In four months, Aonuma's team managed to present realistic horseback riding, which Nintendo later revealed to the public with a trailer at E3 2004 that was met with enormous praise. The game was scheduled to be released the next year and was no longer a follow-up to The Wind Waker; a true sequel to it was released for the Nintendo DS in 2007, in the form of Phantom Hourglass. Miyamoto explained in interviews that the graphical style was chosen to satisfy demand and that it better fit the theme of an older incarnation of Link. The game runs on a modified The Wind Waker engine.

Prior Zelda games have employed a theme of two separate, yet connected, worlds. In A Link to the Past, Link travels between a "Light World" and a "Dark World"; in Ocarina of Time, as well as in Oracle of Ages, Link travels between two different time periods. The Zelda team sought to reuse this motif in the series' latest installment. It was suggested that Link transform into a wolf, much like he metamorphoses into a rabbit in the Dark World of A Link to the Past. (Note: Aonuma 2007, A lupine direction and Minish Cap) The concept for Link to transform into a wolf and its surrounding narrative elements came from a dream that Aonuma had while overseas on a business trip. He dreamt that he was a wolf, locked inside a cage, and, after he woke up, he was confused and disoriented and it took a while for him to remember where he was. The story was created by Aonuma, and it later underwent several changes by scenario writers Mitsuhiro Takano and Aya Kyogoku. Takano created the script for the story scenes, while Kyogoku and Takayuki Ikkaku handled the actual in-game script. Originally, Link was planned to be a wolf from the start to bluntly contrast the Ocarina of Time formula, but this was changed so that new players could be eased into the Zelda series' traditional gameplay and narrative formula. The narrative premise in the story regarding the children of Ordon village being kidnapped was an example of the darker story elements.

The Twilight Realm portions were inspired by the fact that prior Zelda games had always distinctively separated dungeons from the overworld. The team wondered what the result would be if a traditional Zelda dungeon was placed inside the open world instead. This resulted in the hunt for Tears of Light the player partakes in when in the Twilight-covered world. The atmosphere of the Twilight-covered Hyrule, as well as the Twilight Realm dungeon later in the game, were intended to make players feel uncomfortable. Special care was taken, however, to ensure that this was balanced right, so that it did not make the player so uncomfortable that they did not want to progress further or could not enjoy the experience.

Aonuma left his team working on the new idea while he produced The Minish Cap for the Game Boy Advance. When he returned, he found the Twilight Princess team struggling. Emphasis on the parallel worlds and the wolf transformation had made Link's character unbelievable. Aonuma also felt the gameplay lacked the caliber of innovation found in Phantom Hourglass, which was being developed with touch controls for the Nintendo DS. At the same time, the Wii was under development with the code name "Revolution". Miyamoto thought that the Revolution's pointing device, the Wii Remote, was well suited for aiming arrows in Zelda, and he suggested that Aonuma consider using it. (Note: Aonuma 2007, E3 2005 and 120% Zelda)

=== Transition to the Wii ===
Aonuma had anticipated creating a Zelda game for what would later become the Wii, but had assumed that he would need to complete Twilight Princess first. His team began work developing a pointing-based interface for the bow and arrow, and Aonuma found that aiming directly at the screen created a new feel, just like the DS control scheme for Phantom Hourglass. Aonuma felt confident this was the only way to proceed, but worried about consumers who had been anticipating a GameCube release. Developing two versions would mean delaying the previously announced 2005 release, still disappointing the consumer. Nintendo President Satoru Iwata felt that having both versions would satisfy users in the end, even though they would have to wait for the finished product. Aonuma then started working on both versions in parallel. (Note: Aonuma 2007, A Revolutionary idea)

Transferring GameCube development to the Wii was relatively simple, since the Wii was being created to be compatible with GameCube software. At E3 2005, Nintendo released a small number of Nintendo DS game cards containing a preview trailer for Twilight Princess. They also announced that a Zelda title would appear on the Wii (then codenamed "Revolution"), but were not clear to the media if this meant Twilight Princess or a different game.

The team worked on a Wii control scheme, adapting camera control and the fighting mechanics to the new interface. A prototype was created that used a swinging gesture to control the sword from a first-person viewpoint but was unable to show the variety of Link's movements. When the third-person view was restored, Aonuma thought it felt strange to swing the Wii Remote with the right hand to control the sword in Link's left hand, so the entire world map was mirrored for the Wii version. (Note: Aonuma 2007, The first attempt at Wii control) Details about Wii controls began to surface in December 2005 when British publication NGC Magazine claimed that when a GameCube copy of Twilight Princess was played on the Revolution, it would give the player the option of using the Revolution controller. Miyamoto confirmed the Revolution controller-functionality in an interview with Nintendo of Europe and Time reported this soon after. However, support for the Wii controller did not make it into the GameCube release. At E3 2006, Nintendo confirmed that both versions would be available at the Wii launch, and had a playable version of Twilight Princess for the Wii. Later, the GameCube release was pushed back to a month after the launch of the Wii.

Nintendo staff members reported that demo users complained about the difficulty of the control scheme. Aonuma realized that his team had implemented Wii controls under the mindset of "forcing" users to adapt, instead of making the system intuitive and easy to use. He began rethinking the controls with Miyamoto to focus on comfort and ease. (Note: Aonuma 2007, E3 2006 lesson) The camera movement was reworked and item controls were changed to avoid accidental button presses. (Note: Aonuma 2007, Camera and item controls) In addition, the new item system required use of the button that had previously been used for the sword. To solve this, sword controls were transferred back to gestures—something E3 attendees had commented they would like to see. This reintroduced the problem of using a right-handed swing to control a left-handed sword attack. The team did not have enough time before release to rework Link's character model, so they instead flipped the entire game—everything was made a mirror image. (Note: Aonuma 2007, Sword controls) Link was now right-handed, and references to "east" and "west" were reversed. The GameCube version, however, was left with the original orientation. The Twilight Princess player's guide focuses on the Wii version, but has a section in the back with mirror-image maps for GameCube users. (Note: Pelland 2006, pp. 170–191)

=== Music and sound ===
The score was composed by Toru Minegishi and Asuka Ohta, with series regular Koji Kondo serving as the sound supervisor. Minegishi took charge of composition and sound design in Twilight Princess, providing all field and dungeon music. For the trailers, three pieces were written by different composers, two of which were created by Mahito Yokota and Kondo. Michiru Ōshima created orchestral arrangements for the three compositions, later to be performed by an ensemble conducted by Taizo Takemoto. Kondo's piece was chosen as music for the E3 2005 trailer and for the demo movie after the title screen. Midna has the most voice acting—her on-screen dialogue is often accompanied by a babble of pseudo-speech, which was produced by scrambling English phrases sampled by Japanese voice actress Akiko Kōmoto.

Media requests at the trade show prompted Kondo to consider using orchestral music for the other tracks, a notion reinforced by his preference for live instruments. He originally envisioned a full 50-person orchestra for action sequences and a string quartet for more "lyrical moments", though the final product used sequenced music instead. Kondo later cited the lack of interactivity that comes with orchestral music as one of the main reasons for the decision. Both six- and seven-track versions of the soundtrack were released on November 19, 2006, as part of a Nintendo Power promotion and bundled with replicas of the Master Sword and the Hylian Shield.

=== Technical vulnerability ===
Following the discovery of a buffer overflow vulnerability in the Wii version of Twilight Princess, an exploit known as the "Twilight Hack" was developed, allowing the execution of custom code from a Secure Digital (SD) card on the console. A specifically designed save file would cause the game to load unsigned code, which could include Executable and Linkable Format (ELF) programs and homebrew Wii applications. Versions 3.3 and 3.4 of the Wii Menu prevented copying exploited save files onto the console until circumvention methods were discovered, and version 4.0 of the Wii Menu patched the vulnerability.

=== Twilight Princess HD ===
A high-definition remaster, The Legend of Zelda: Twilight Princess HD, was developed by Tantalus Media for the Wii U. Announced during a Nintendo Direct presentation on November 13, 2015, it features enhanced graphics and Amiibo functionality. It was released worldwide in March 2016.

The idea for a high-definition version of Twilight Princess first originated during the production of Breath of the Wild. Nintendo experimented with an HD version of Twilight Princess running on Wii U development kits when trying to settle on a graphical style for the new game. This ultimately led to the production of The Wind Waker HD, whose success encouraged the Zelda team to pursue other high-definition remasters. After its release, which was developed internally at Nintendo in only six months, the Zelda team settled on an HD remaster of Twilight Princess. At the time, most of the Zelda team was preoccupied with Breath of the Wild, so Nintendo sought a partnership with an external development studio, the Australia-based Tantalus Media, to work on Twilight Princess HD.

According to Eiji Aonuma, who directed the original release and produced Twilight Princess HD, ensuring the remaster would take advantage of the Wii U GamePad was a point of focus early in the title's development. The control scheme used in the GameCube version was adapted for the remaster due to similarities between the button layouts of the two consoles' controllers. Aonuma considered underwater gameplay in the remaster to be significantly improved. Other enhancements include speeding up a handful of cutscenes that seemed overly long by modern standards and reducing repetitive gameplay elements, such as collecting Tears of Light while in the Twilight Realm. A commitment to "preserving the feel of the original" inspired several design decisions, such as keeping the frame rate at 30 frames per second. Tomomi Sano, the assistant director of the Wii U version, noted the degree of refinement the graphics would receive required much consideration: "When we created more precise models of objects to go with the higher resolution, we found that everything was too clear and we lost that soft and delicate atmosphere that you get in particular at twilight or with the light in a forest".

Certain bundles contain a Wolf Link Amiibo figurine, which unlocks a Wii U-exclusive dungeon called the "Cave of Shadows" and can carry data over to Breath of the Wild. In the Cave of Shadows, Link fights waves of enemies while restricted to his wolf form. Comparable to the optional "Cave of Ordeals" present in the original release, opportunities to recover health during the trial are sparse. Other Zelda-related Amiibo figurines have distinct functions: Link and Toon Link replenish arrows, Zelda and Sheik restore Link's health, and Ganondorf causes Link to take twice as much damage. A CD containing 20 musical selections was available as a GameStop preorder bonus in North America; it is included with the limited-edition bundle in other regions. A three-disc original soundtrack consisting of 108 pieces was released in Japan in July 2016.

== Reception ==
=== Reviews ===
Reception

Aggregate score
Aggregator	Score		
Aggregator	GameCube	Wii	Wii U
Metacritic	96/100 (Note: Based on 16 reviews)	95/100 (Note: Based on 73 reviews)	86/100 (Note: Based on 74 reviews)

Review scores
Publication	Score		
Publication	GameCube	Wii	Wii U
1Up.com	A+	A+	
AllGame	4.5/5		
Computer and Video Games		10/10	
Destructoid			8/10
Edge		9/10	
Electronic Gaming Monthly		30/30	
Famitsu		38/40	
GamePro		5/5	
GameRevolution			9/10
GameSpot	8.9/10	8.8/10	9/10
GameSpy		5/5	
GamesRadar+		5/5	4/5
IGN	9.5/10	9.5/10	8.6/10
Nintendo Life			9/10
Nintendo Power	9.5/10	9.5/10	
Nintendo World Report		10/10	9/10
Official Nintendo Magazine		97%	
Polygon			8/10
Shacknews			7/10
USgamer			4/5
VentureBeat			90/100
X-Play		5/5	
CGMagazine			8.5/10

Awards
Publication	Award
GameTrailers	Game of the Year (2006)
1UP.com	Game of the Year (2006)
Electronic Gaming Monthly	Game of the Year (2006)
Game Informer	Game of the Year (2006)
GamesRadar	Game of the Year (2006)
GameSpy	Game of the Year (2006)
Spacey Awards	Game of the Year (2006)
X-Play	Game of the Year (2006)
Nintendo Power	Game of the Year (2006)
Golden Joystick Award	Nintendo Game of the Year (2016)

Twilight Princess was released to critical acclaim and commercial success. It received perfect scores from major publications such as 1UP.com, Computer and Video Games, Electronic Gaming Monthly, Game Informer, GamesRadar and GameSpy. On the review aggregator Metacritic, Twilight Princess holds scores of 95/100 for the Wii version and 96/100 for the GameCube version, indicating "universal acclaim". It is the highest-rated game of 2006 on Metacritic. GameTrailers in their review called it one of the greatest games ever created.

On release, Twilight Princess was considered to be the greatest Zelda game ever made by many critics including writers for 1UP.com, Computer and Video Games, Electronic Gaming Monthly, Game Informer, GamesRadar, IGN and The Washington Post. Game Informer called it "so creative that it rivals the best that Hollywood has to offer". GamesRadar praised Twilight Princess as "a game that deserves nothing but the absolute highest recommendation". Cubed3 hailed Twilight Princess as "the single greatest videogame experience". Twilight Princess' graphics were praised for the art style and animation, although the game was designed for the GameCube, which is technically lacking compared to the next generation consoles. Both IGN and GameSpy pointed out the existence of blurry textures and low-resolution characters. Despite these complaints, Computer and Video Games felt the atmosphere was superior to that of any previous Zelda game and regarded Twilight Princess' Hyrule as the best version ever created. PALGN praised the cinematics, noting that "the cutscenes are the best ever in Zelda games". Regarding the Wii version, GameSpot's Jeff Gerstmann said the Wii controls felt "tacked-on", although 1UP.com said the remote-swinging sword attacks were "the most impressive in the entire series". Gaming Nexus considered Twilight Princess' soundtrack to be the best of this generation, though IGN criticized its MIDI-formatted songs for lacking "the punch and crispness" of their orchestrated counterparts.

=== Awards ===
Twilight Princess received the awards for Best Artistic Design, Best Original Score, and Best Use of Sound from IGN for its GameCube version. Both IGN and Nintendo Power gave Twilight Princess the awards for Best Graphics and Best Story. Twilight Princess received Game of the Year awards from GameTrailers, 1UP.com, Electronic Gaming Monthly, Game Informer, GamesRadar, GameSpy, Spacey Awards, X-Play and Nintendo Power. It was also given awards for Best Adventure Game from the Game Critics Awards, X-Play, IGN, GameTrailers, 1UP.com, and Nintendo Power. It was considered the Best Console Game by the Game Critics Awards and GameSpy. During the 10th Annual Interactive Achievement Awards, Twilight Princess was awarded with "Outstanding Achievement in Story and Character Development" by the Academy of Interactive Arts & Sciences, while also receiving nominations for "Overall Game of the Year", "Console Game of the Year", "Action/Adventure Game of the Year", "Outstanding Achievement in Game Design", and "Outstanding Achievement in Gameplay Engineering". The game placed 16th in Official Nintendo Magazine's list of the 100 Greatest Nintendo Games of All Time. IGN ranked it the 4th-best Wii game, and the 5th-best GameCube game. Nintendo Power ranked it the third-best game to be released on a Nintendo system in the 2000s decade.

=== Sales ===
In North America, Twilight Princess was sold with three of every four Wii purchases during its first week. The Wii version sold 412,000 copies in the United States during November 2006, representing 87% of Wii launch sales that month, the highest attach rate for a launch game since Super Mario 64 launched with the Nintendo 64 in 1996. It went on to become America's fifth-best-selling game of 2006 with 1.5 million copies sold for the Wii and GameCube in the US that year. In the United Kingdom, the Wii version received a Platinum sales award from the Entertainment and Leisure Software Publishers Association (ELSPA), indicating sales of at least 300,000 copies in the UK.

The game had sold 5.82 million copies on the Wii as of March 2011, and 1.32 million on the GameCube as of March 2007. As of September 2015, the game had sold 8.85 million copies worldwide across both platforms, making it the best-selling single title in the series until it was surpassed by The Legend of Zelda: Breath of the Wild in April 2018.

=== Twilight Princess HD ===
Twilight Princess HD holds a score of 86/100 at the review aggregator Metacritic, indicating "generally favorable" reviews. The title received the Nintendo Game of the Year award at the Golden Joystick Awards in November 2016.

The remaster sold 52,282 copies during its first week of release in Japan, which placed it at second place in the video-game sales charts. The following week, it came in at number 9 on the charts, selling an additional 7,705 copies. By comparison, 30,264 copies of The Wind Waker HD were sold in its first week in Japan. In the first week of Twilight Princess HD's United Kingdom release, the remaster was the second-best-selling game and the best-selling game released for a single platform in the country. Twilight Princess HD's sales dropped 84% in its second week in the UK, making it the ninth-best-selling game in the country. In the United States, it was the third-best-selling game sold in brick-and-mortar retailers throughout March 2016, according to market-research firm The NPD Group. As of December 2022, it had sold 1.17 million copies worldwide.

== Legacy ==
An eleven-volume manga series based on Twilight Princess, penned and illustrated by Akira Himekawa, was first released in Japan on February 8, 2016, and ran until January 30, 2022. The series was made available via physical copies, online bookstores, and publisher Shogakukan's MangaOne mobile application. While the manga adaptation began almost ten years after the initial release on which it is based, it launched only a month before the release of the high-definition remake. Viz Media began releasing an English localization of the series in 2017 and was finished in March 2022.

To commemorate the launch of the My Nintendo loyalty program in March 2016, Nintendo released My Nintendo Picross: The Legend of Zelda: Twilight Princess, a nonogram puzzle video game developed by Jupiter as a downloadable title for the Nintendo 3DS.

Midna, in both her imp and Twili forms, Zant, and NPC character Agitha, all appeared as playable warriors in the Zelda crossover title Hyrule Warriors and its various iterations. Since the release of Hyrule Warriors, Agitha has been recognised as a "main character" of Twilight Princess.

== See also ==
- Link's Crossbow Training, a 2007 shooting video game created for the Wii Zapper, using the world and assets of Twilight Princess
