= Yūdai =

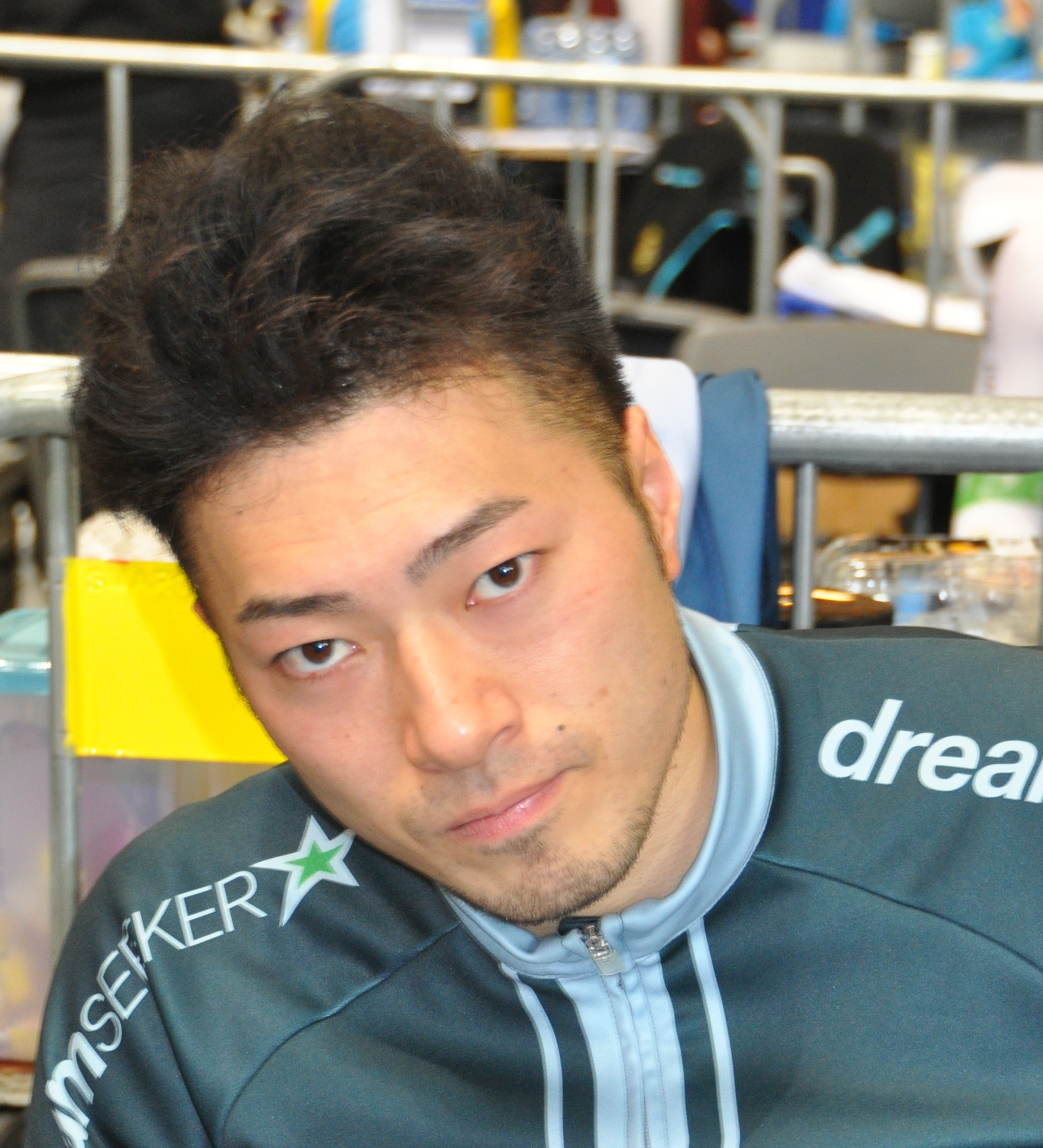
- Yudai Nitta, Japanese cyclist
- Pronunciation: jɯɯdai (IPA)
- Gender: Male

Origin
- Origin: Japanese
- Meaning: Different meanings depending on the kanji used

Other names
- Alternative spelling: Yudai (Kunrei-shiki) Yudai (Nihon-shiki) Yūdai, Yudai, Yuudai (Hepburn)

Yūdai, Yudai or Yuudai is a masculine Japanese given name.

== Written forms ==
Yūdai can be written using different combinations of kanji characters. Here are some examples:

- 勇大, "courage, big"
- 悠大, "calm, big"
- 雄大, "male, big"
- 優大, "gentleness, big"
- 祐大, "help, big"
- 佑大, "help, big"
- 裕大, "abundant, big"
- 有大, "have, big"
- 友大, "friend, big"

The name can also be written in hiragana ゆうだい or katakana ユウダイ.

== Notable people with the name ==
- Yudai Baba (馬場 雄大; born 1995), Japanese basketball player
- Yudai Chiba (千葉 雄大; born 1989), Japanese actor
- Yudai Fujioka (藤岡 裕大; born 1993), Japanese baseball player
- Yudai Inoue (井上 裕大; born 1989), Japanese footballer
- Yudai Konishi (小西 雄大; born 1998), Japanese footballer
- Yudai Nagano (footballer) (永野 雄大; born 1998), Japanese footballer
- Yudai Nakashima (中嶋 雄大; born 1984), Japanese footballer
- Yudai Nishikawa (西川 優大; born 1986), Japanese footballer
- Yudai Nitta (新田 祐大; born 1986), Japanese cyclist
- Yudai Ono (大野 雄大; born 1988), Japanese baseball player
- Yudai Tanaka (disambiguation), multiple people
- Yudai Yamaguchi (山口 雄大; born 1971), Japanese film director
- Yudai Yamamoto (山本 雄大; born 1983), Japanese football referee
- Yudai Koga (古賀 祐大; born 1997), Japanese singer and actor
