= Midna =

Fictional character

Princess Midna
- The Legend of Zelda character
- Midna in The Legend of Zelda: Twilight Princess HD
- First game: The Legend of Zelda: Twilight Princess (2006)
- Designed by: Yusuke Nakano
- Voiced by: Akiko Kōmoto

In-universe information
- Species: Twili

Princess Midna (Japanese: ミドナ, Hepburn: Midona) is a fictional character in Nintendo's The Legend of Zelda series, introduced as one of the main protagonists in Twilight Princess. She is the princess of the Twilight Realm and a member of the magic-wielding Twili who joins forces with Link to prevent the kingdom of Hyrule from being enveloped by a corrupted parallel dimension known as the Twilight Realm. While Midna appears as an imp-like creature in the majority of Twilight Princess, her actual form is humanoid. She was designed by Yusuke Nakano and voiced by Akiko Kōmoto. Midna also appears as a playable character in Hyrule Warriors, and makes minor appearances in the Super Smash Bros. series.

Midna was generally well received by critics and fans alike, considered one of the best new characters of the 2000s and one of the best female Nintendo characters. Her role in Twilight Princess has been compared to that of Navi, who accompanies Link in Ocarina of Time.

== Concept and design ==
Despite first appearing in The Legend of Zelda: Twilight Princess, she was originally conceived in a scrapped Nintendo project. Eventually re-purposed for Twilight Princess, Midna was illustrated by Yusuke Nakano and voiced by Akiko Kōmoto. In describing the character, Twilight Princess director Eiji Aonuma called her "tsundere", an archetype where someone starts snobbish and brash, before becoming gentler and kinder over time. When asked by Game Informer editor Billy Berghammer if Midna would make a follow-up appearance to her role in Twilight Princess, Aonuma found it unlikely that she would return due to the game's ending, but added that if there was enough demand, the developers may consider it.

Midna's original form is a turquoise-skinned woman with body markings on her limbs, orange hair, and red eyes. As stated in The Legend of Zelda: Hyrule Historia, her design has an "air of the Middle East" as opposed to Princess Zelda's Westernized design. She wears a South Asian-like attire composed of black gagra choli with a trailing black veil. However, after being cursed by Zant, Midna became an imp. In her imp form, Midna is diminutive, and the clothes she wore in her true form seem to have been fused to her. She also wears a fused shadow relic as a mask. Her bright orange hair is her main method of physical control while she is in imp form and often uses it to deal physical damage or control Link while he is in his wolf form.

== Appearances ==
=== Twilight Princess ===
Midna first appeared in The Legend of Zelda: Twilight Princess, where she was the ruler of the Twilight Realm until the villain Zant usurped the throne and turned her into an imp, taking a piece of an artifact called Fused Shadow. She decided to use the protagonist, Link, who has been turned into a wolf, and helps him escape his captors in order to get the other pieces of the Fused Shadow. Over time, Midna becomes less insensitive and sassy toward Link. After obtaining the last Fused Shadow, Zant catches the two of them off-guard and seizes it, exposing Midna to the Light Spirit Lanayru and making her fall ill while also cursing Link to remain in wolf form. Link seeks out the Master Sword to heal Midna, with Princess Zelda healing Midna, causing herself to disappear.

After obtaining the Master Sword, Link and Midna begin their search for the Twilight Mirror, only to find that Zant has shattered it. After finding the pieces and restoring it, Midna and Link travel to the Twilight Realm and defeat Zant. The two of them travel to Hyrule Castle to defeat Ganondorf, the source of Zant's power. Midna uses the power of the Fused Shadows to attempt to finish off Ganondorf, but is found to have been unsuccessful when Ganondorf approaches Link, crushing the fragment of the Fused Shadow that Midna wore on her face as a mask. After Ganondorf is defeated and Hyrule Castle is destroyed, Midna is restored to her original humanoid form. She returns to the Twilight Realm and shatters the Mirror of Twilight, separating the Light and Twilight Realms and preventing a potential repeat of Zant's actions by someone else.

==== Manga adaptation ====
Midna appears in a long-running manga series based on Twilight Princess. The series ran from 2016 to 2022 and was written and illustrated by Japanese artist duo Akira Himekawa. The manga provides additional details to the storyline of Twilight Princess, including information about Midna's backstory, and further develops the relationship between her and Link.

=== Hyrule Warriors ===
In Hyrule Warriors, Midna is attacked by the sorceress Cia during her battle with Zant's forces and is banished from the Twilight Realm when Cia allies with Zant. While antagonistic at first, Midna allies herself with Lana and Agitha to help Link and Zelda defeat Cia and restore order, and later to defeat the revived Ganondorf. She is also playable in her true Twili form as part of the Twilight Princess DLC pack. In Hyrule Warriors Legends, a mysterious crystal briefly restores Midna to her true form. She uses her restored power to aid Princess Zelda with help from Link, but she is forced to destroy the crystal and returns to her imp form.

=== Other appearances ===
Midna makes minor appearances in multiple entries in the Super Smash Bros. series as collectibles, including Super Smash Bros. Brawl, Super Smash Bros. for Nintendo 3DS and Wii U, and Super Smash Bros. Ultimate. In Ultimate, she also appears as an Assist Trophy, a character who can be summoned to affect the course of battle.

For Twilight Princess HD on the Wii U, Nintendo released the Wolf Link amiibo, which features Midna riding on the back of Link in his wolf form.

== Reception ==
Midna has received mostly positive reception from both the video game press and the public for her role in Twilight Princess. GamesRadar listed her as one of the best new characters of the 2000s, stating that she was the first relatable The Legend of Zelda character since Link, Zelda, and Ganon. She was among the top female video game characters in a ranking of members of Official Nintendo Magazine's forum, with staff noting that she was popular with Nintendo fans due in part to her backstory. Game Informer writer Billy Berghammer ended up loving her despite being initially skeptical, describing her as a cool character due to how she messed with Link throughout the game. Nintendo Power staff identified the relationship between Link and Midna as one of the most compelling in The Legend of Zelda history. Midna has been compared to several characters, most often to fellow The Legend of Zelda series character Navi. In particular, multiple critics identified her as a more interesting and less annoying take on Navi's role. Before the release of Super Smash Bros. Brawl, Midna's inclusion as a playable character was a popular suggestion amongst fans and critics.

Midna has also seen a fair amount of criticism, in spite of her largely positive reception. While America's Intelligence Wire writer Dave Arey found her intriguing, he felt she was less developed than he would have liked. RPGamer writer Matthew Rickert found her uninteresting and unlikable, criticizing her for taking too much of the plot's focus and replacing Zelda.
