= Yudai Nagano =

Yudai Nagano may refer to:

- Yudai Nagano (footballer) (永野 雄大, born 1998)
- Yudai Nagano (fencer) (永野 雄大, born 1998)
