= List of The Legend of Zelda: Ocarina of Time characters =

The Legend of Zelda: Ocarina of Time is the fifth main entry in The Legend of Zelda series, and the first to both be on the Nintendo 64 and in 3D. It was developed by Nintendo, with series protagonist Link tasked with rescuing Hyrule from the villain, Ganondorf. Link interacts with a variety of characters throughout the game, some friendly and some antagonistic. The game's cast had various points of inspiration, including works by J. R. R. Tolkien and the TV series Twin Peaks. The staff was told to focus less on the plot and more on the characters, and emphasis was put on giving them interesting and realistic animations to make them more real. Some members of the cast were also intended as references to previous The Legend of Zelda games.

== Conception and development ==
Inspiration for the characters in Ocarina of Time came from a variety of sources, including J. R. R. Tolkien, whose Hobbit race served as the basis for the Deku Scrubs. Shigeru Miyamoto also said that the characters were partially inspired by the American television series Twin Peaks. Miyamoto wanted various characters to fulfill certain roles, citing Kaepora Gaebora being a "grandfather figure" and for girl characters like Saria and Malon to be included since Link is a boy. In a 1999 interview Miyamoto said he focuses less on plot and more on making the cast interesting, feeling that the characters are the most interesting part of a The Legend of Zelda game. The game has more than 60 characters, with each taking about 2-3 days to create. Character designer Yoshiki Haruhana recounts a fellow staff member saying that the characters he makes, such as Dampé the Gravekeeper, are freaks, though he notes that this is not his intention. Character designer Satoru Takizawa noted that they intended to make them feel real, and thus gave them interesting and realistic animations. Takizawa also noted that character creation was difficult, as he was worried about changing the initial character designs too much, The game made references through its characters to earlier games; for example, the six sages other than Princess Zelda are named after towns from Zelda II: The Adventure of Link, and Malon and Talon are based on Marin and Tarin from The Legend of Zelda: Link's Awakening.

== Main characters ==
=== Link ===
Link (Note: リンク, Rinku) is the main protagonist of Ocarina of Time and The Legend of Zelda series as a whole. This incarnation of Link is designated as the Hero of Time. He reappears as the main protagonist of Majora's Mask and as a supporting character in Twilight Princess as the Hero's Shade, with his spirit training the main protagonist, his descendant the Hero of Twilight (also named Link).

=== Navi ===
Navi (Note: ナビィ, Nabī) is a fairy who is Link's "navigator" in Ocarina of Time. The Great Deku Tree in Kokiri Forest instructed her to assist Link in his quest to stop Ganondorf. All Kokiri have companion fairies, but because Link is actually a Hylian, he does not receive one until Navi joins him near the beginning of Ocarina of Time. In gameplay, Navi functions primarily as a guide that points out clues in the environment and helps the player learn the controls and advance in the game. Most of her hints are about how to progress in the story or defeat enemies. She can also be used to lock onto enemies, items and other characters in the game. She is one of the few characters with any voice-acting in the series, and one of the few characters who uses English words, such as "Hey", "Look", "Listen", "Watch out", and "Hello". Navi leaves Link at the end of the game after he puts the Master Sword back in the Pedestal of Time. In Majora's Mask, Link's search for a "beloved and invaluable friend", who is implied to be Navi, leads him to enter Termina. GamesRadar editor Mikel Reparaz ranked Navi as the most irritating female character, stating that she would have been bearable if she did not interrupt the gameplay as often. Fellow GamesRadar editor Tom Goulter listed her as the second most annoying sidekick ever.

=== Epona ===
Epona (Note: エポナ, Epona) is Link's horse, who was introduced in Ocarina of Time and appears in other games in the series, including Majora's Mask, The Minish Cap, Twilight Princess, Breath of the Wild, and Tears of the Kingdom, the former being the same horse as in Ocarina of Time. She comes to Link's aid after being called by "Epona's Song", which he plays on the ocarina in Ocarina of Time and Majora's Mask, and on a blade of "horse grass" in Twilight Princess. Shigeru Miyamoto said that Epona was chosen as Link's main mode of transport so that he could get in contact with other characters. In Ocarina of Time, she is first encountered at Lon Lon Ranch, where Malon teaches young Link "Epona's Song". Later, Link frees her from Ingo's control and she becomes his steed. Charlotte Krol of NME chose the experience of riding Epona in Ocarina of Time as one of the most enjoyable aspects of the game, noting that the speed at which players traverse the game world felt revolutionary at the time. Chris Hoffman of GamesRadar praised the subtle bond between Link and Epona and described her as his steadfast companion throughout the game.

== Sages ==
Symbols of the Seven Sages

=== Kaepora Gaebora / Rauru ===
Kaepora Gaebora (Note: ケポラ・ゲボラ, Kepora Gebora) is a wise owl who guides Link throughout various games in the series. He also appears in Majora's Mask and Four Swords Adventures. Screen Rant described the character as "arguably Ocarina of Time's most hated character", noting his lengthy speeches, which rarely provide useful advice. Devin Ellis Friend reported that interacting with the character had caused particular frustration, as at the end of his speeches he asks players if they want the advice repeated; as the cursor defaults to yes, this can cause players to accidentally repeat the advice.

In Ocarina of Time, he is an alternate form taken on by Rauru, (Note: ラウル, Rauru) the Sage of Light, a fact hinted at by one of the in-game Gossip Stones and confirmed by Hyrule Historia. Rauru is a Hylian high priest and the Sage of Light, as well as the last of the ancient Sages. He cares for Link during his temporary imprisonment in the Sacred Realm and provides him with information about the Sages and the events of the past seven years. He then tasks Link with finding the five remaining Sages and gives him the Light Medallion.

=== Saria ===
Saria (Note: サリア, Saria) is a Kokiri girl and Link's childhood friend. She is encountered on a bridge leading out of Kokiri Forest, where she gives him the Fairy Ocarina, an instrument that the player uses to learn several songs. She is later encountered in the Lost Woods, where she teaches Link Saria's Song. Saria eventually sacrifices herself by becoming the Sage of the Forest Temple to help Link on his quest.

=== Darunia ===
Darunia (Note: ダルニア, Darunia) is the leader of the Goron tribe, a race of rock-eating giants. Link first meets him in Goron City, but he refuses to speak to him until he hears Saria's Song, which changes his mood and causes him to start dancing. After Link reopens Dodongo's cavern, the source of the Gorons' food supply, Darunia gives him the Goron's Ruby and declares the two sworn brothers, later naming his son after Link. Following his rise to power, Ganondorf imprisons the Gorons in the Fire Temple, planning to feed them to the dragon Volvagia, prompting Darunia to try and save them. After Link slays Volvagia, Darunia awakens as the Fire Sage and aids Link on his journey. He also appears as a playable character in Hyrule Warriors.

=== Ruto ===
Princess Ruto (Note: ルト, Ruto) is the princess of the Zora, a race of fish-like humanoids. As a child, she is accidentally swallowed by the Zora's guardian Jabu-Jabu when he is cursed by Ganondorf. She is rescued by Link and rewards him with the Zora's Sapphire, declaring that this makes the two betrothed to one another. After the Zora refuse to follow Ganondorf's rule, he punishes them by sealing their entire domain in ice. However, Ruto is saved by Sheik and travels to the Water Temple to break Ganondorf's curse. There, Ruto reunites with Link and guides him through the temple. After Link kills Morpha, the source of the curse, Ruto awakens as the Water Sage and reluctantly puts her marriage on hold to aid him. She also appears as a playable character in Hyrule Warriors.

=== Nabooru ===
Nabooru (Note: ナボール, Nabōru) is the second-in-command of the Gerudo tribe, a race of thieves. She protests Ganondorf's cruelty toward innocents and travels to the Spirit Temple to interfere with his plans, recruiting the child Link to recover the Silver Gauntlets for her. However, Twinrova, Ganondorf's surrogate mothers, kidnap Nabooru and brainwash her into becoming his follower. After Link defeats them, Nabooru awakens as the Sage of Spirit and decides to seek vengeance against her captors.

== Other characters ==
=== Great Deku Tree ===
The Great Deku Tree is an ancient, large tree with a humanoid face and big mustache. In Ocarina of Time, he is charged with watching over the Kokiri, a childlike race of forest spirits who inhabit the Kokiri Forest. He suffers from a curse Ganon cast upon him, as he wishes to gain the power of the Spiritual Stone of the Forest. The Deku Tree sends Navi to retrieve Link to destroy the cause of the curse, and he serves as the first dungeon. Although Link succeeds, he ultimately succumbs to the curse. Seven years in the future, Link discovers a little sprout which grows into the Deku Sprout, his successor. In The Wind Waker, the Great Deku Tree appears as the guardian of the forest. He also appears in Breath of the Wild, where Zelda tasked him with guarding the Master Sword in Korok Forest until Link is ready to claim it. In Tears of the Kingdom, the Great Deku Tree has been poisoned by Gloom, requiring Link to cleanse the tree by defeating the Gloom Hands and Phantom Ganon.

=== Dampé ===
Dampé (Note: ダンペイ, Danpei) is an old gravekeeper who appears in several games. He was introduced in Ocarina of Time, where he is found in the Kakariko Village graveyard and provides a guided tour of the graveyard as well as help child Link find treasures. When playing as adult Link, Dampé is dead and Link must enter his grave and challenge his ghost to a race to claim the hookshot. In Majora's Mask, he is found in the Ikana Graveyard looking for a treasure, which Link helps him find. In Four Swords Adventures, he is found at the graveyard in the swamp area and tells Link about the Forest of Light. In The Minish Cap, he is found in the Royal Valley, where Link can fuse kinstones with him to unlock rewards and locations. He also appears as a graveyard caretaker in A Link Between Worlds. In the Nintendo Switch remake of Link's Awakening, he runs the Chamber Dungeon editor, where players can assemble custom dungeons. In The Legend of Zelda: Echoes of Wisdom, he appears as an engineer who creates automatons that function similarly to echoes.

=== Malon ===
Malon (Note: マロン, Maron) is a young girl who appears throughout the series. She first appears in Ocarina of Time, where she interacts with Link on several occasions. She is encountered outside Hyrule Castle, where she sings "Epona's Song". Later in the game, Link visits Lon Lon Ranch and helps Malon and her father Talon with their ordeals. There, she teaches Link "Epona's Song", which allows him to call Epona at any time. After Link takes ownership of Epona, he can return to Malon to challenge her in a time trial. If he beats Malon's record of 50 seconds around the track, she will put a cow in his house in Kokiri Forest. In Oracle of Seasons, she and her father breed Cuccos north of Horon Village near Eyeglass Lake in Holodrum. As part of the trading quest, if Link gives her the Cuccodex, she will give him the Lon Lon Egg. In Four Swords Adventures, the four Links guide Malon to her father, Talon, when her path is blocked by castle knights. Upon reuniting her with Talon, he gives the Links permission to use his horses, which appear when one of the Links touch a carrot. She also appears in The Minish Cap, where Link helps her and Talon back into their house by finding a key; they later move to the town to sell Lon Lon Milk.

=== Twinrova ===
Kotake (Note: コタケ, Kotake) and Koume, (Note: コウメ, Kōme) collectively referred to as the Twinrova Sisters (Note: 双生魔術師ツインローバ, Sōsei Majutsushi Tsuinrōba; lit. 'Twin Magicians Twinrova') (/ˌtwɪnˈroʊvə/), are Gerudo witches and the surrogate mothers and servants of Ganondorf. They can brainwash others to serve him and merge to form the stronger witch Twinrova; the brooms they use to fly become scepters that channel Twinrova's power. They appear in Ocarina of Time, Majora's Mask, Oracle of Seasons, and Oracle of Ages. When Link fights them in a boss battle in Ocarina of Time, as Twinrova they are capable of attacking him with both fire and ice, and are defeated by deflecting their attacks using the Mirror Shield. Alternate versions of the Twinrova Sisters appear as friendly non-player characters in Majora's Mask, with Koume working as a boat tour guide and Kotake a potion shopkeeper. Chris Freiburg, writing for Den of Geek, listed this battle as the best temple guardian boss fight in the game and considered it one of the best in the series. Kenneth Shepard of Kotaku thought that the Twinrova battle represents the fusion of the two sisters' contrasting magical abilities and personalities, but is also an allegory for their fraught relationship. Dan Ryckert of Game Informer ranked Twinrova as the best boss battle in the series calling it a "thrilling fight" because, in the final phase, Link must absorb three blasts of the same element before being able to deflect an attack, which means that the player must anticipate Twinrova's moves to succeed.

=== Skull Kid ===
Skull Kid (Note: スタルキッド, Sutaru Kiddo) is a young imp who first appears in Ocarina of Time. Three can be found in the Lost Woods, that appear with no faces. Two play a memory game with Link as a child, and one rewards him if he plays a particular song for him on his ocarina. In Majora's Mask, the Skull Kid is seen alongside the fairies Tatl and Tael. He steals Majora's Mask, which grants him great power at the cost of corrupting him. Under its influence, he curses the inhabitants of Termina and causes the moon to fall toward Clock Town. He is thwarted after the Four Giants of Termina stop the moon from falling and Link defeats Majora. Skull Kid notes that Link "smells a lot like that fairy kid who taught [him] that song in the woods", suggesting that he is the same Skull Kid that appeared in Ocarina of Time. Skull Kid also makes an appearance in Twilight Princess. He appears in Super Smash Bros. Brawl as a Sticker. He appears in The Legend of Zelda manga. Skull Kid also appears as a playable character in Hyrule Warriors Legends and Cadence of Hyrule. Levi Winslow of Kotaku chose Skull Kid as the scariest aspect of Majora's Mask, because his pranks become increasingly more violent as the mask takes over his sanity. Bloody Disgusting praised the character's physical design, particularly his vibrant, heart-shaped mask, which "exudes a mystic appeal". Skull Kid's appearance in the 2016 short fan film Majora's Mask: Terrible Fate, voiced by Joe Zieja, received widespread attention among The Legend of Zelda fandom and critical acclaim.

=== Happy Mask Salesman ===
The Happy Mask Salesman (Note: お面屋, Omen'ya; lit. 'Mask Shop Owner') is a mysterious man who travels the world collecting masks. He appears in Ocarina of Time and Oracle of Ages, where he sells masks used in item-trading sidequests. In Majora's Mask, he plays a more integral role. On his travels to find rare masks, he is ambushed by the Skull Kid and his fairies, Tatl and Tael, who steal Majora's Mask. After noticing that the Skull Kid cursed Link into a Deku Scrub, he offers to undo the curse in return for Majora's Mask and Link's Ocarina of Time. The Happy Mask Salesman also provides Link with information about the various masks that can be recovered whenever Link speaks with him. Marty Sliva, writing for The Escapist, described the character's first words "You've met with a terrible fate, haven't you?" as "iconic" as they convey a wealth of meaning. The phrase is the character's reaction to Link's transformation at the start of the game, but also hints at an uncertainty that this dark fate can be reversed. IGN ranked him number four on its list of the Top 20 Weirdest Zelda Characters: "With his manic smile, followed by that hideous sneer, followed by all other manner of mood swings, this guy was downright unsettling".

== Reception ==
When discussing the elements that made GamesRadar+ writer Chris Hoffman love Ocarina of Time, he appreciated how it expanded the kinds of characters Link could encounter, namely the Gorons, Zora, Gerudo, and Sheikah. IGN writers Richard George and Audrey Drake praised the impact of its characters, feeling that it expanded on characters and their depth in ways previous The Legend of Zelda games did not. They discussed how characters, ranking from major ones like Saria to minor ones like Guru-Guru, were more memorable than previous casts, and they particularly appreciated how much deeper Link was.
