= Hyrule Warriors =

2014 video game

- Cover art, depicting Link, Princess Zelda, Lana, and other characters
- Developers: Omega Force; Team Ninja
- Publishers: JP: Koei Tecmo; WW: Nintendo
- Director: Masaki Furusawa
- Producers: Hisashi Koinuma; Yosuke Hayashi
- Designer: Takahiro Kawai
- Programmer: Takanori Goshima
- Artist: Mariko Hirokane
- Writers: Hiroyuki Numoto; Junpei Imura
- Composers: Masato Koike; Yuki Matsumura
- Series: The Legend of Zelda; Dynasty Warriors
- Platforms: Wii U; Nintendo 3DS; Nintendo Switch
- Release: August 14, 2014: Wii U; JP: August 14, 2014; EU: September 19, 2014; AU: September 20, 2014; NA: September 26, 2014 Nintendo 3DS; JP: January 21, 2016; EU: March 24, 2016; AU: March 24, 2016; NA: March 25, 2016 Switch; JP: March 22, 2018; WW: May 18, 2018
- Genre: Hack and slash
- Modes: Single-player, multiplayer

Hyrule Warriors (Note: Zelda Musou (Japanese: ゼルダ無双, Hepburn: Zeruda Musō) in Japan) is a 2014 hack and slash game developed by Omega Force and Team Ninja and published by Nintendo for the Wii U. The game mixes settings and characters from Nintendo's The Legend of Zelda franchise with the gameplay of Koei Tecmo's Dynasty Warriors series, and features an original story following numerous Zelda characters as they team up to stop the resurrection of Ganondorf.

The game was announced in a 2013 Nintendo Direct presentation. Koei Tecmo's studios developed it with supervision from Zelda series producer Eiji Aonuma, who hoped that it would provide a new style of gameplay that differed from mainline installments in the series. Nintendo promoted the game prior to release with appearances at E3 shows, and later supported it with downloadable content packs that were released from 2014 to 2016.

Hyrule Warriors was released in Japan in August 2014, and worldwide the following month. It received generally positive reviews, with critics praising its presentation and effective combination of Zelda and Dynasty Warriors elements, although the repetitive nature of its gameplay was criticized. The game was commercially successful and became one of the best-selling games on the Wii U. An updated port for the Nintendo 3DS, Hyrule Warriors Legends, (Note: Zelda Musou: Hyrule All-Stars (ゼルダ無双 ハイラルオールスターズ, Zeruda Musō Hairaru Ōru Sutāzu)) was released in 2016. A second port, Hyrule Warriors: Definitive Edition, (Note: Zelda Musou: Hyrule All-Stars DX (ゼルダ無双 ハイラルオールスターズ DX, Zeruda Musō Hairaru Ōru Sutāzu DX)) was released for the Nintendo Switch in 2018. The game was followed by Hyrule Warriors: Age of Calamity (2020) for the Nintendo Switch, and Hyrule Warriors: Age of Imprisonment (2025) for the Nintendo Switch 2.

== Gameplay ==
Gameplay image from the game's first stage, in which the player is controlling Link to battle a group of enemy Bokoblins

Hyrule Warriors mixes the hack and slash gameplay of Koei Tecmo's Dynasty Warriors series of video games with settings and characters from Nintendo's The Legend of Zelda series. Amongst many other characters, the player controls an original iteration of Link in melee combat to take on large numbers of enemies from the Legend of Zelda series. While there is a much stronger emphasis on combat than other games in the Legend of Zelda series, the player may use common weapons from prior games in the series, such as a sword, bombs, and Link's signature spin attack. Enemy targeting also returns, in combination with elements from the Dynasty Warriors combat system. Obtaining items through discovering and opening chests is retained as well.

The game has a context-based combat system, in which the player character's abilities change depending on the weapon chosen. Role-playing elements such as weapons and character leveling also appear. Defeating certain enemies gives players weapon bags, which will grant a random weapon to the character, and materials bags, which can be used to power up characters. "Sealed weapons" may also be found in treasure boxes, which increase the types of weapons randomly generated for the player in the field. The game supports an asymmetric local two-player mode with one player using the Wii U GamePad and another using a monitor. The game is also compatible with Amiibo figures, with figures based on The Legend of Zelda series unlocking additional content such as new weapons.

The main campaign of Hyrule Warriors, "Legend Mode", allows players to progress through the game's story; these story chapters can be replayed with any character in "Free Mode". Additionally, the game features an "Adventure Mode", in which players explore a map based on that of the original The Legend of Zelda and complete specific objectives, such as defeating a certain number of enemies within a time limit or completing a mission with a specific character and weapon. An update released on the game's launch date added "Challenge Mode", which encourages players to collect as many rupees as possible in a set scenario. The in-game Bazaar allows players to forge new weapons, spend rupees to raise characters' levels, create potions to temporarily boost a character's stats in battle, and exchange materials for badges that augment characters' abilities. The game also offers an additional quest to collect 100 Gold Skulltulas, tokens that appear in specific Legend Mode and Adventure Mode levels after defeating enough enemies, which will unlock illustration pieces of several characters in the game and contribute to upgrading the in-game apothecary.

== Plot ==
The game is set in Hyrule, outside of the official Zelda timeline. Long ago, Ganondorf was defeated and his soul splintered into four fragments. Three of them were sealed at different moments in time, while the Master Sword trapped the fourth. Ganondorf plots his resurrection through Cia, a sorceress who protects the balance of the Triforce. Cia becomes fascinated with the spirit of the hero of legend, with her romantic feelings for the hero providing Ganondorf an opportunity to purge her inner light. As a result, Cia becomes consumed in her desires, opening the Gate of Souls, a portal to different time-space realities of Hyrule, to amass an army of monsters. Seeking to unite the Triforce and conquer Hyrule, she uses her subordinates Wizzro and Volga to wage war against Princess Zelda and the Hyrulean army.

As Cia's forces attack Hyrule Castle, Link, a Hyrulean soldier-in-training, rushes out to aid the other troops and discovers he possesses the Triforce of Courage. However, the castle is taken, and Princess Zelda is unaccounted for in the aftermath, so Hyrule general Impa asks Link to aid her in finding the princess. While searching, Link and Impa meet Sheik, a Sheikah warrior who claims to know Zelda's whereabouts, and Lana, a sorceress from the same clan as Cia. The group heads to the Valley of Seers hoping to close the Gate of Souls, but Cia traps Link and Sheik, the latter of whom is revealed to bear the Triforce of Wisdom. Cia steals both Triforce pieces, combines them with her own Triforce of Power, and uses the completed Triforce to open portals in time and space to the resting places of Ganondorf's spirit fragments.

To restore Hyrule to normal, Link, Impa, and Lana each lead their own campaign to drive out Cia's armies and close the Gates of Souls in each era. Along the way, they are aided by each time period's native heroes, including Darunia and Princess Ruto from Ocarina of Time, Agitha and Midna from Twilight Princess, and Fi from Skyward Sword. During this time, Sheik reveals herself to be Zelda in disguise, and Lana explains that she and Cia were once the same person, with Lana embodying the light Ganondorf purged from Cia's heart. Meanwhile, three of Ganondorf's spirit fragments are released, allowing his body to be resurrected. No longer needing Cia, he attempts to take the Triforce, but Cia sends Link and Zelda's pieces back to their owners and uses her own piece to lock Ganondorf away.

After retrieving the Master Sword, whose power is strengthened by his bonds of friendship, Link prepares to confront Cia, who is weakened after being abandoned by Wizzro and Volga and using her own life force to strengthen her troops. He defeats her, and she fades away, with Lana inheriting her piece of the Triforce. Using the completed Triforce's power, the time-displaced heroes are sent back to their own periods, and Hyrule is restored to normal, with Lana once again closing the Gate of Souls.

However, due to the Master Sword's removal, the last of Ganondorf's spirit fragments is released, and Ganondorf is fully resurrected. Summoning Ghirahim from Skyward Sword and Zant from Twilight Princess to aid him, Ganondorf takes all three Triforce pieces from their bearers and uses them to strengthen his army and take over Hyrule Castle. Lana summons the heroes from Hyrule's history, and the combined group of heroes defeats Ghirahim and Zant before venturing towards Ganon's Tower. Overpowered by Link, Ganondorf uses the Triforce to transform himself into the dark beast Ganon. Link defeats Ganon with the help of Zelda's light arrows, and the heroes use the Triforce to seal him away once more. The heroes of the past are returned, Lana resumes watching over the Triforce in Cia's place, and Link and Zelda return the Master Sword to its pedestal to prevent Ganondorf's escape.

=== Hyrule Warriors Legends ===
During Cia's siege on Hyrule Castle, a Cucco farmer named Linkle receives word of the invading army. Believing she is the newest incarnation of the legendary hero, she equips her grandmother's compass and sets off for the castle. However, her poor navigational skills cause her to travel in the wrong direction, and she is attacked by the Skull Kid, who attempts to steal her compass. During the struggle, Linkle discovers the compass's magical properties and reclaims it. After she continues to get lost, aiding many of the heroes from Hyrule's past she encounters along the way, she arrives at Hyrule Castle just after Ganon's defeat and assists Impa against the remaining monsters. When they are ambushed by an invincible Dark King Dodongo, Linkle's compass reacts and purifies the creature, allowing them to defeat it and drive the monsters off. Linkle celebrates with the rest of the army as Link and Zelda return from restoring the Master Sword to its pedestal.

Shortly thereafter, an unknown figure steals the Triforce of Power from Lana while she is searching for clues behind Cia's disappearance. At the same time, a new rift is opened and pulls pieces of the Great Sea landscape from The Wind Waker into Hyrule. Allying with Tetra and King Daphnes, Link and Lana eventually restore Cia, who explains she had vanished because her magic was stolen by Phantom Ganon, the mastermind behind the recent events. The group defeats Phantom Ganon, returning Cia's magic and the Triforce of Power. Tetra and the King are returned to their native time, while Cia, Link, and Zelda use the Triforce to restore Hyrule to normal. Having made peace with everyone, Cia returns with Lana to the Valley of Seers to watch over the Triforce together.

== Development and release ==
Hyrule Warriors was announced in December 2013 in a Nintendo Direct video as a collaboration with Koei Tecmo. Nintendo president Satoru Iwata said that the game would not be the next main series installment of The Legend of Zelda, but rather a spin-off from the main series. Long-time Zelda producer, Eiji Aonuma, was the supervisor of the title. The concept for Hyrule Warriors was first proposed by Team Ninja lead developer Yosuke Hayashi while he and Koei Tecmo executive VP Hisashi Koinuma, who was in charge of the Warriors franchise, were discussing a possible Dynasty Warriors cross-franchise game with Nintendo. The Zelda franchise was chosen due to the fact that Hayashi, Koinuma, and many staff at the company were fans of the series.

When Warriors was presented to Eiji Aonuma, Koei Tecmo used their cross-over game One Piece: Pirate Warriors as an example of how the game would feel. In contrast to previous collaborations, Nintendo was confident in Koei Tecmo's ability to make the game, leading them to have "far more expectations than uncertainties". This confidence was shared by Aonuma, who readily accepted being offered a place in the game's development by Shigeru Miyamoto. Part of the reason behind Aonuma's strong support of Hyrule Warriors was an ongoing push by him to break away from many traditions that have become attached to the Zelda franchise since its inception. Along with Omega Force, the main developers for the Dynasty Warriors series, Hayashi and Koinuma brought in help from Team Ninja, who had developed the Dead or Alive series, to help with one-on-one combat and inject new ideas into the development process. Koei Tecmo's president Yoichi Erikawa said that he hoped Hyrule Warriors would appeal to fans of both franchises and go on to sell at least one million copies.

Hyrule Warriors was publicly displayed at the Electronic Entertainment Expo 2014 with a new trailer, in which Agitha, Lana, and Midna were confirmed as playable characters. Zant and Argorok were also confirmed as boss characters. The game also appeared in playable form for show floor attendees, as part of a Nintendo Treehouse presentation. Over the time span following the E3 announcement, Nintendo released further information on the game's website, confirming Fi, Ruto, Darunia, and Sheik as playable characters, as well as Ghirahim, the Imprisoned, and a version of Gohma as boss characters. During a Nintendo Direct presentation in August, Zant and Ghirahim were also confirmed to be playable, alongside the game's main antagonist and final playable character, Ganondorf.

A female version of Link was also considered as a potential playable character, but was scrapped during development. Sketches of the female version were included in the Hyrule Warriors art book included in the Japanese limited editions of the game and the character grew in popularity shortly afterwards, becoming one of the more widely requested characters during Koei Tecmo's open call for new playable characters in the game's official Twitter. The female version, officially named Linkle, was later announced for Hyrule Warriors Legends during the Nintendo Direct web stream in November 2015. Former Nintendo character writer Chris Pranger stated that Linkle was the last character he wrote for before leaving Nintendo.

Hyrule Warriors' relationship to the Zelda franchise is classified in a few different ways. Iwata called the game a "Zelda spin-off", and Nintendo's own website directly refers to both Hyrule Warriors and Hyrule Warriors: Legends as "The Legend of Zelda Games". The Legend of Zelda Encyclopedia grouped it in with other games with Zelda content in it, such as Super Smash Bros., Soul Calibur II, and Sonic Lost World. Aonuma described the game's placement within the Zelda chronology as "not in the universe but connected to the timeline" and that "there is a link between the two, but it exists as a separate dimension, so it doesn't exist as part of the main canon".

=== Release ===
Image of Link's blue scarf

The game was first released in Japan on August 14, 2014, and was available in both regular and special editions. The first special edition, the "Premium Box", features a copy of the game, an art book, a Triforce-shaped clock, and two extra costumes for the character. The second special edition, called the "Treasure Box", adds a third costume, a scarf resembling Link's in the game and a miniature treasure chest accessory. A special edition featuring the game and Link's Warrior scarf was released in Europe and Australia.

=== Downloadable content ===
Three costume packs were available as downloadable content (DLC) for those who pre-ordered the game at specific retailers. Each of these gave Link and Zelda one additional costume based on their appearances in a prior Legend of Zelda title, including Ocarina of Time, Twilight Princess and Skyward Sword. Players who registered the game on Club Nintendo within the first month of release received costumes for Ganondorf based on Ocarina of Time and Twilight Princess. These DLC packs were later made available for purchase via the Nintendo eShop in December 2014. Players who use the Link or Toon Link Amiibo figures with Hyrule Warriors will also unlock the Spinner weapon from Twilight Princess for Link, while scanning other figures will grant the player random equipment or items, with figures based on The Legend of Zelda granting higher-tier rewards. A free update that adds Cia, Volga, and Wizzro as playable characters was released in October 2014. The game has since received a series of free updates that add several other features, such as a higher level cap, new character and weapon skins, and additional challenges. An additional "Classic Tunic" costume for Link based on the original The Legend of Zelda was distributed for free in celebration of Hyrule Warriors Legends' announcement.

Additionally, four DLC packs were released in the months following the game's launch. The first DLC bundle, the "Master Quest Pack", was released in October 2014. This bundle included a new "Cia's Tale" story campaign, alternate Guardian of Time costumes for Lana and Cia, Epona as a weapon for Link, 16 unlockable character re-color costumes, and most notably, a second map for Adventure Mode. The second bundle, the "Twilight Princess Pack", was released in November, and added Twili Midna as a playable character, the Dominion Rod weapon for Zelda, Ilia and Postman costumes for Zelda and Link, respectively, 16 unlockable character re-color costumes, and a third Adventure Map. The third bundle, the "Majora's Mask Pack", was released in February 2015 and added Tingle and Young Link as playable characters, a Skull Kid costume for Lana, Ocarina of Time costumes for Sheik and Impa, 16 unlockable mask-based costumes, and a fourth Adventure map. The final bundle, the "Boss Pack", was released in February in Japan and March in North America and added two new modes: "Boss Challenge", in which players fight multiple boss enemies at once, and "Ganon's Fury", in which players can play certain challenges as final boss Ganon, with a playable giant Cucco for Ganon's Fury and 5 new re-color costumes as rewards. Players who purchased all four packs received a Dark Link costume.

Throughout the year 2016, four new DLC packs for the Wii U and Nintendo 3DS versions of the game were released, containing additional Adventure Mode maps, characters, costumes, and more. The Wii U version received all packs except for the first one. The packs could be purchased individually or as part of a season pass. The first pack, the "Master Wind Waker Pack", added a "Master Quest" version of the Great Sea Adventure Map for the 3DS version. Medli, from The Wind Waker, was released as a free downloadable character for both versions to coincide with the release of the Master Wind Waker Pack. The second pack, based on Link's Awakening, was released on June 30 in Japan, Europe and North America. The pack added Marin as a playable character and a Boots weapon for Linkle on both versions, and a new Adventure Map for the 3DS version. The third pack, the Phantom Hourglass and Spirit Tracks pack, was released on September 1. The pack included the playable character Toon Zelda and a Sand Wand weapon for Toon Link on both versions, and an additional Adventure Map for 3DS. The final DLC pack, the A Link Between Worlds pack was released on October 31. It contained a final Adventure Mode map for the 3DS version, as well as Ravio and Yuga as the final playable characters for both versions of the game. Players who purchased the season pass received an Ganondorf costume based on his appearance in The Wind Waker.

=== Nintendo 3DS port ===
A port of the game for the Nintendo 3DS, Hyrule Warriors Legends (Zelda Musou: Hyrule All-Stars in Japan), was announced at Nintendo's Digital Event at E3 2015. The port includes all previously released DLC, features the ability to switch characters on the fly (utilizing the same real-time character switching mechanic from Samurai Warriors: Chronicles), and adds two new story chapters: one based around new character Linkle, and one featuring characters and environments from The Legend of Zelda: The Wind Waker that serves as an epilogue. Tetra, King Daphnes, and Toon Link, all from The Wind Waker, along with Skull Kid from Majora's Mask and the original character Linkle, the aforementioned girl who resembles Link, appear as new playable characters. The game features a new "My Fairy" system and an additional Adventure Mode map inspired by The Wind Waker, as well as more costumes and a new Trident weapon for Ganondorf. Players who purchased the 3DS version received a download code to add the new characters and weapon to the Wii U version. Due to hardware limitations, the game only supports autostereoscopic 3D on the New Nintendo 3DS. The port was released in Japan in January 2016, and released internationally in March.

=== Nintendo Switch port ===
A Nintendo Switch port under the name Hyrule Warriors: Definitive Edition (Zelda Musou: Hyrule All-Stars DX in Japan) was released in Japan in March 2018, and worldwide in May. The port includes all the content and DLC from the Wii U and Nintendo 3DS releases, as well as new costumes for Link and Zelda based on their appearances in The Legend of Zelda: Breath of the Wild.

== Reception ==
Reception

Aggregate scores
Aggregator	Score		
Aggregator	3DS	NS	Wii U
Metacritic	70/100	78/100	76/100
OpenCritic	N/A	68% recommend	N/A

Review scores
Publication	Score		
Publication	3DS	NS	Wii U
4Players	3DS: 55/100; New 3DS: 70/100	74/100	70/100
Computer and Video Games	N/A	N/A	8/10
Destructoid	8/10	N/A	8.5/10
Edge	N/A	N/A	6/10
Electronic Gaming Monthly	N/A	N/A	8/10
Eurogamer	N/A	N/A	8/10
Famitsu	N/A	N/A	36/40
Game Informer	6/10	N/A	8/10
GameRevolution	4/5	N/A	3.5/5
GameSpot	7/10	8/10	8/10
GamesRadar+	2.5/5	N/A	2/5
GamesTM	N/A	N/A	8/10
GameTrailers	N/A	N/A	7/10
Giant Bomb	N/A	N/A	3/5
Hardcore Gamer	4/5	4.5/5	4/5
Hyper	N/A	N/A	80/100
IGN	6.8/10	7.5/10	7/10
Jeuxvideo.com	N/A	16/20	N/A
Joystiq	N/A	N/A	4/5
Nintendo Life	7/10	8/10	7/10
Nintendo World Report	8.5/10	8.5/10	8.5/10
Official Nintendo Magazine	N/A	N/A	87%
Pocket Gamer	N/A	4/5	N/A
Polygon	N/A	N/A	5.5/10
Shacknews	N/A	9/10	8/10
The Guardian	N/A	N/A	4/5
USgamer	N/A	4/5	3.5/5
VentureBeat	N/A	84/100	85/100
VideoGamer.com	N/A	N/A	7/10

Hyrule Warriors received "generally favorable reviews", according to the review aggregator website Metacritic. Critics generally praised its numerous references to the Legend of Zelda universe, while others enjoyed the combination of the two franchises, although some criticized the repetition of the fighting formula. Miguel Concepcion of GameSpot praised the "delightful Legend of Zelda fan service from beginning to end" while still managing to be "a fine Dynasty Warriors spin-off in its own right". James Stephanie Sterling of The Escapist praised the great variety compared to other Warriors titles, noting the "meaty combat system" and different styles between each playable character, calling the game "a mad idea that should logically get old after an hour, but never does", while Chris Carter of Destructoid called the amount of fan service "staggering" and being particularly favorable towards the cooperative gameplay modes. Kyle Hilliard of Game Informer stated that Team Ninja did a far better job on collaborating with Nintendo on Hyrule Warriors than they had on their last title, Metroid: Other M, stating that the game "isn't a true Zelda game, but there's plenty here for Zelda fans to enjoy". Jose Otero of IGN also enjoyed the cross-over, in what he states "makes me feel powerful in a world I love", yet in contrast noted an issue with cooperative play, particularly with the player using the Wii U GamePad such as a lower resolution and slow down.

Lorenzo Veloria of GamesRadar however was less favorable of the gameplay ties to the Warriors series, writing that despite "brilliant Zelda fan-service", the combat was "unimaginative" and repetitive. Dan Ryckert of Giant Bomb felt that the mission variety was "basic" and full of "mindless slashing". The review for GameTrailers concluded that "your long term enjoyment of this game boils down to how much you like Dynasty Warriors, or hack-and-slash games in general". By contrast, Simon Parkin of Eurogamer felt that Warriors gameplay is "often unfairly criticized", before going on to state that compared to previous titles Hyrule Warriors rewards thoughtful play and demands a strategic approach that transcends the brute force combo-strings of its moment-to-moment gameplay.

All four Famitsu reviewers awarded Hyrule Warriors a score of 9 out of 10, for a total score of 36/40.

=== Sales ===
The game sold 69,090 copies, or 57% of its shipment, in the first week of its release in Japan. However, Hyrule Warriors was more successful in the West, selling 190,000 units in its first weekend in North America. The overseas success of the title surprised Koei Tecmo, since it had sold beyond their expectations. By January 2015, the game had shipped one million copies.

In October 2018, a financial report published by Koei Tecmo revealed that the Nintendo Switch port sold more than expected outside Japan, despite not revealing sales figures.

== Legacy ==
A second Hyrule Warriors game, Age of Calamity, was released on November 20, 2020, for the Nintendo Switch. Age of Calamity is a spin-off of The Legend of Zelda: Breath of the Wild (2017), set 100 years before the events of that game. A third Hyrule Warriors game, Age of Imprisonment, was released on the Nintendo Switch 2 in November 2025. Age of Imprisonment is a prequel to The Legend of Zelda: Tears of the Kingdom (2023), taking place during the Imprisoning War seen via flashbacks in the latter.
