= Yudai Township =

Yudai Township 玉带乡
- Township
- Location in Sichuan
- Coordinates: 31°52′35″N 107°34′46″E
- Country: People's Republic of China
- Province: Sichuan
- Prefecture-level city: Dazhou
- County-level city: Wanyuan
- Time zone: UTC+8 (China Standard)

Yudai Township (simplified Chinese: 玉带乡; traditional Chinese: 玉带鄉; pinyin: Yùdài Xiāng; lit. 'jade belt') is a township under the administration of Wanyuan City in far northeastern Sichuan province, China. As of 2018, it has seven villages under its administration.
