= The Legend of Zelda: Oracle of Seasons and Oracle of Ages =

2001 video games

The Legend of Zelda: Oracle of Seasons The Legend of Zelda: Oracle of Ages
- European covers
- Developer: Flagship
- Publisher: Nintendo
- Director: Hidemaro Fujibayashi
- Producer: Noritaka Funamizu
- Designers: Hidemaro Fujibayashi; Yoichiro Ikeda; Su Chol Lee
- Artist: Yusuke Nakano
- Writer: Hidemaro Fujibayashi
- Composers: Minako Adachi; Kiyohiro Sada
- Series: The Legend of Zelda
- Platform: Game Boy Color
- Release: JP: February 27, 2001; NA: May 14, 2001; EU: October 5, 2001
- Genre: Action-adventure
- Mode: Single-player

The Legend of Zelda: Oracle of Seasons (Note: Known in Japan as Zeruda no Densetsu: Fushigi no Kinomi Daichi no Shō (Japanese: ゼルダの伝説 ふしぎの木の実 大地(だいち)の章; lit. The Legend of Zelda: The Mysterious Seeds – Chapter of Earth)) and The Legend of Zelda: Oracle of Ages (Note: Known in Japan as Zeruda no Densetsu: Fushigi no Kinomi Jikū no Shō (Japanese: ゼルダの伝説 ふしぎの木の実 時空(じくう)の章; lit. The Legend of Zelda: The Mysterious Seeds – Chapter of Space-Time)) are 2001 action-adventure games developed by Flagship and published by Nintendo for the Game Boy Color. They are the seventh and eighth installments in the Legend of Zelda series.

The gameplay and graphics are similar to that of Link's Awakening (1993) for the Game Boy. The player controls Link from an overhead perspective. Oracle of Ages focuses on puzzles, while Oracle of Seasons focuses on action. The games can interact with one other via passwords or a Game Link Cable. In Seasons, Link uses the Rod of Seasons to controls the seasons and change the environment. In Ages, he uses the Harp of Ages to travel between the past and the present.

In Seasons, the Triforce transports Link to the land of Holodrum, where he sees Onox kidnap Din, the Oracle of Seasons. In Ages, the Triforce transports Link to Labrynna, where Veran possesses Nayru. Before he can infiltrate Onox's castle and Veran's tower, Link must collect the eight Essences of Nature and the eight Essences of Time, which are hidden in dungeons and guarded by bosses. The main plot is revealed once the player finishes both games.

After experimenting with porting the original Legend of Zelda (1986) to the Game Boy Color, Capcom's Flagship team, supervised by Yoshiki Okamoto, began developing interconnected Zelda games that could be played in any order. Seasons and Ages sold 3.99 million copies combined. Critics praised the gameplay, colorful designs and graphic quality, but criticized the inconsistent sound quality. Both games were rereleased on the Virtual Console of Nintendo 3DS in 2013 and the Nintendo Classics service in 2023.

== Gameplay ==
In Oracle of Seasons, the environment changes with the season. From top left going clockwise: spring, summer, winter, autumn. Gameplay is sometimes affected by the seasons; during the winter for example, a path opens up that cannot be accessed during any other season; or during spring, the flower can be used to access otherwise unreachable ledges.

The gameplay of Oracle of Seasons and Ages is similar to that of Link's Awakening (1993) for Game Boy, with the same basic controls, graphics, and sounds. Like most Legend of Zelda games, exploration and combat take place from an overhead perspective. Link uses a sword for his primary attack, complemented by secondary weapons and items. Basic items such as bombs and a boomerang are common to both games. Other items are exclusive to one game, with a counterpart in the other (e.g., the slingshot in Seasons and the seed shooter in Ages both shoot seeds, while the magnetic gloves in Seasons and the switch hook in Ages are used to access otherwise unreachable areas). Unlike most Zelda games, a sword and shield is not always equipped when the player possesses them; they can be assigned like any other item into either of two available slots. Most of each of the games is spent finding the eight Essences hidden in dungeons—large, usually underground, areas containing enemies and puzzles. Each dungeon culminates with a boss that guards the Essence.

When not in a dungeon, Link explores the overworld. In Seasons, the overworld consists of Holodrum and the subterranean world of Subrosia inhabited by the dwarf-like Subrosian people. The two worlds are linked by several portals. In Ages, Link travels between present-day Labrynna and the past, connected by Time Holes. In either game, some areas of one world are accessible only from portals from the other and vice versa. Holodrum, Subrosia, and Labrynna contain optional side quests and upgrades for Link and his equipment. One such side quest is ring collection. Rings provide Link with various bonuses and abilities, such as improved defense. Other rings have no practical uses or effects, e.g. rings that weaken Link's attack or defense, or transform Link into an enemy creature. Another side quest is the optional trading game, in which Link receives and delivers special items to certain people throughout the land. Once completed, Link receives an upgraded sword. In both games, there are many circumstances when a previous item can be upgraded into a more useful form. The latter three dungeons in both games will hold a more powerful version of an item received earlier in the game. Both the sword's offensive power and the shield's defensive abilities can be upgraded twice.

The central item of Oracle of Seasons is the Rod of Seasons. By standing on a stump and swinging the rod, Link can change the season and affect his surroundings. For example, to cross a body of water, Link can change the season to winter and walk on the ice. Changing the season to summer causes vines to flourish, which Link can use to scale cliffs. When Link obtains the rod, he initially cannot use it. In the course of the game, Link visits four towers that house the four spirits of the seasons; each tower Link visits allows him to switch to an additional season.

In Oracle of Ages, the central item is the Harp of Ages, which Link uses to manipulate time and travel between the past and the present. The Harp initially opens portals through time at fixed locations; as the player progresses through the game Link learns new songs on the harp that make traveling through time easier.

=== Interaction ===
Although the two are built on the same game engine, Oracle of Ages concentrates on puzzles, while Oracle of Seasons focuses on action. Each is a complete game capable of interacting with the other, via passwords or a Game Link Cable.

Upon completing either game, players receive a password that can be used to play an alternative version of the other. In this version, some characters mention passwords that can be given to characters in the first game in exchange for an item or upgrade. By taking a new password back into the linked game, the item or upgrade can be transferred. Rings can be traded by this password system or randomly created by connecting two games with a Game Link Cable.

In the alternative version, plot points are changed or expanded upon to allow the game to serve as a sequel. It also features an extended ending in which Twinrova kidnaps Zelda, and lights the third Flame of Despair to revive Ganon. The player can then enter Twinrova's lair and battle Twinrova and Ganon. Upon completing the alternative game, another password gives the player the Victory Ring, commemorating the defeat of Ganon.

== Plot ==
=== Oracle of Seasons ===
Seasons begins as the Triforce calls out to Link from within Hyrule Castle. Link approaches it, and is transported to a forest where he encounters a traveling group led by a dancer named Din. After Din welcomes Link to Holodrum, the sky becomes covered in black clouds. A voice from the clouds calls Din the Oracle of Seasons and refers to himself as Onox, General of Darkness. A funnel cloud drops from the sky, taking Din into its dark heights. Onox seals Din in a crystal and sinks the Temple of Seasons into the subterranean land of Subrosia, sending the seasons of Holodrum into disarray and causing them to change rapidly.

Din's attendant, Impa, tells Link that they were headed for Hyrule; she instructs him to see the Maku Tree in Horon Village, the capital of Holodrum. Link finds a sword in a cave and makes his way to the tree. The Maku Tree tells Link he will need the eight Essences of Nature and gives him the Gnarled Key, which unlocks the dungeon holding the first Essence. Link retrieves the eight Essences from eight dungeons throughout Holodrum and Subrosia and brings them to the Maku Tree, who uses them to create a Huge Maku Seed, a sacred evil-cleansing seed that allows Link to enter Onox's castle. Link enters the castle, defeats Onox, and rescues Din, who tells him that he is now a true hero and must face a new trial soon. Twinrova, watching the scene remotely, states that the Flame of Destruction has been powered by the havoc Onox has wrought.

=== Oracle of Ages ===
As with Seasons, the Triforce calls out to Link. Link is transported to a forest in the land of Labrynna, where he hears screaming. In a clearing, Link finds Impa, surrounded by monsters, but the monsters flee when they see Link. Impa then asks Link to help her find a singer in the forest. The two find Nayru, a young blue-haired woman singing on a tree stump surrounded by forest creatures. A shadow emerges from Impa and reveals itself as Veran, the Sorceress of Shadows. Veran possesses Nayru, the Oracle of Ages; this disrupts the flow of time. Through Nayru, Veran manipulates Queen Ambi into forcibly conscripting every capable man in Labrynna to construct a large Black Tower.

Link receives a sword from Impa and makes his way to the Maku Tree in Lynna City, the capital of Labrynna. Veran orders that the Maku Tree be killed; Link uses a time portal to travel to the past to prevent this. The Maku Tree tells Link he will need the eight Essences of Time to defeat Veran. Link sets out to retrieve the eight Essences, hidden in eight dungeons throughout Labrynna's past and present. After getting the sixth Essence, Link is told he can save Nayru. He invades Queen Ambi's castle and removes Veran's spirit from Nayru, but Veran then possesses Queen Ambi. Link gathers the remaining Essences and brings them to the Maku Tree, who uses them to create a Huge Maku Seed that allows Link to enter Veran's Black Tower. Link ascends the tower and defeats Veran, rescues Queen Ambi, and Nayru tells him that all has returned to normal. Twinrova, watching the scene remotely, states that Veran has lit the Flame of Sorrow.

=== Linked ending ===
If one game is played as a sequel to the other by a linked password, Twinrova captures Princess Zelda, lighting the Flame of Despair. Link enters a warp point by the Maku Tree and faces Twinrova, who is attempting to use the three Flames to revive Ganon. Link defeats Twinrova, who sacrifice themselves in place of Zelda, resulting in Ganon being revived as a mindless raging beast that Link kills. He frees Zelda; together, they exit the crumbling castle. After the credits, Link waves to a crowd from a sailboat off the shore of a land with a castle in the background.

== Development ==
In early 1999, Yoshiki Okamoto, then head of Capcom's screenwriter subsidiary Flagship, proposed remaking the original The Legend of Zelda for the Game Boy Color to Shigeru Miyamoto, the game designer at Nintendo who created the series. Okamoto wanted to remake the original game so that young children could play it, but also as a test for the development team to move on to a more ambitious sequel if it was successful.

Okamoto wanted to work on games and follow them up with sequels in four to five months, including Zelda games in this workflow. According to reporting by IGN, Okamoto was asked to develop six Zelda games for the Game Boy Color: two based on earlier installments and four original entries, but Okamoto disputed this.

Contrary to Miyamoto's design mentality of creating the gameplay system first, development started out with the scenario writing, which Flagship was in charge of. Some of the staff members, including the team led by director and designer Hidemaro Fujibayashi that was responsible for tasks other than the storyline, wanted to skip the remake and create an original Zelda game right away. As the original game was deemed too difficult for the new generation of players, more and more changes were applied to the point where it had an entirely different world map. As a result, the team ran into problems because the scenario and the maps had to be reworked constantly to make all the modifications match. The Game Boy Color's screen presented an additional hurdle when attempting to rework the earlier Zelda game as it was narrower than that of a television; players could not view an entire room without scrolling, which made it easy to overlook stairways or clues on walls.

Dismayed by the lack of progress, Okamoto asked Miyamoto for help, who proposed a trilogy of games, each with a different focus on gameplay elements. This trilogy was referred to as the "Triforce Series", named after the Triforce, a relic that plays a role in many Zelda games. The Triforce is composed of three parts: the Triforces of Power, Wisdom, and Courage; each game in the trilogy was going to be associated with a piece of the Triforce, with one game being the conversion of the original The Legend of Zelda. The first game was demonstrated at Nintendo's SpaceWorld trade show in 1999, under the working title Fushigi no Kinomi – Chikara no Shō (ふしぎの木の実 ～力の章～). This action-oriented game concerned Ganon's theft of Princess Zelda and the "Rod of the Seasons", which threw the seasons of Hyrule into chaos—a precursor to the plot of Oracle of Seasons. In the playable demonstration, Link solved puzzles by using the Rod of the Seasons to manipulate the environment and change the current season. Chie no Shō, which focused on color-based puzzles, and Yūki no Shō, which used the times of day to solve puzzles in a mechanic similar to the use of seasons, were not shown. In the US, the games became Mystical Seed of Power, Mystical Seed of Wisdom, and Mystical Seed of Courage.

The games interacted with each other: players could begin with any of the three games and have the actions of the first game affect the story of the other two, a concept conceived by Okamoto. More than ten of Flagship's scenarists, among them Resident Evil writer Junichi Miyashita, worked on the three stories. The developers considered using a cell phone adapter to transfer data, but decided on a password system. The limitations of this system and the difficulty of coordinating three games proved too complicated, so the project was scaled back to two games at Miyamoto's suggestion. Condensing the games into a single cartridge was never considered, as the prospect of multiple endings and the added replay value afforded by the ability to play the games in either order was too important. Oracle of Seasons was adapted from Mystical Seed of Power, Oracle of Ages was adapted from Mystical Seed of Wisdom, and Mystical Seed of Courage was canceled.

These sweeping design changes pushed the release dates closer to the release of the Game Boy Advance (GBA), the next system in the Game Boy line that is backward compatible with Game Boy Color games. The team considered adding special functionality to the game triggered only when played on a GBA, but was afraid that the additional development time required for the addition would cause the games to be released after the GBA. When the release date of the GBA was postponed, the team was able to incorporate GBA functionality and release the games approximately a month before the GBA was released. Staggered releases were abandoned in favor of releasing the games simultaneously. This made it easier for the team to test the interaction between the games and keep the style consistent. Each game was shipped on an 8-megabit (16-megabit in Europe) cartridge. The music was composed by two employees of the Japanese music and sound effect production company Pure Sound, credited under the pseudonyms "M-Adachi" and "Kyopi". Nintendo artist and series regular Yusuke Nakano designed the characters, and incorporated previous creations from Ocarina of Time into Oracle of Seasons and characters from Majora's Mask into Oracle of Ages. The games had a marketing budget of $5 million.

== Reception ==
Reception

Aggregate score
Aggregator	Score
GameRankings	91.37% (Seasons) (based on 23 reviews); 92.20% (Ages) (based on 20 reviews)

Review scores
Publication	Score
Electronic Gaming Monthly	9.0/10 and 9.5/10
Famitsu	8/10, 7/10, 8/10, 8/10 (Seasons); 8/10, 7/10, 8/10, 7/10 (Ages)
GamePro	4/5
GameSpot	9.2/10
IGN	10/10
Nintendo Power	5/5
Power Unlimited	91/100 (Seasons and Ages)

Oracle of Seasons and Ages sold 3.99 million copies combined. In Japan, they were the third-best-selling Game Boy Color games, with 746,054 copies sold. Reviews were positive: Chris Carle of IGN said that Seasons and Ages were best Game Boy Color games, and Craig Majaski of Gaming Age called them the two best games for a handheld console. GameSpot presented Ages and Seasons with its annual "Best Game Boy Color Game" award. They were rated the 34th (Seasons) and 39th (Ages) best games made on a Nintendo System in Nintendo Power's Top 200 Games list. In August 2008, Nintendo Power listed Oracle of Seasons and Ages as the fourth and fifth-best Game Boy/Game Boy Color video games. The games placed joint 57th in Official Nintendo Magazine's 100 greatest Nintendo games of all time. Game Informer's Ben Reeves called them the 10th best Game Boy games. The interconnection was seen as one of the best features. The ability to play the games in reverse order after completion increases the replay value, as does trading passwords between the two. GamesRadar listed The Legend of Zelda: Oracle of Seasons / Ages as one of the games they want in the 3DS Virtual Console; both Oracle of Ages and Seasons were later released on the platform on May 30, 2013.

During the 5th Annual Interactive Achievement Awards, the Academy of Interactive Arts & Sciences nominated Oracle of Seasons for "Hand-Held Game of the Year", while Oracle of Ages was nominated for "Console Role-Playing Game of the Year".

Critics enjoyed the graphics; GamePro called Seasons "bright and colorful" with "surprisingly expressive and well-designed" animations, and Gaming Target said Ages is "beautiful and creative", with "meticulous attention to detail". Gaming Age called both games "the pinnacle of good graphics on the Game Boy Color system". Although the two share graphics to a large extent, Seasons is distinguished by swapping the color palette to reflect the current season. IGN felt that the expressive colors used for the changing seasons made Seasons the more graphically impressive of the two.

Reviews of the audio were mixed. Reviewers noted that the sound was hampered by the poor quality of the Game Boy Color's speakers, although it fared favorably compared with other games for the system. The selection of songs was praised for complementing familiar Zelda songs and sounds with new music. The Zelda theme and the traditional sound effect played upon solving a puzzle were considered welcome additions, but other sound effects were criticized as simplistic "beeps".

== Gamebooks ==
Two game books were released based on the games as part of the Nintendo You Decide on the Adventure series by Scholastic. Both were written by Craig Wessel and based on the events in the games with few minor differences. The first one, based on Oracle of Seasons, was published in October 2001. The second, based on Oracle of Ages, was published in January 2002.

== See also ==
- Oracle of Seasons and Ages manga
