= Yudai Tanaka =

Yudai Tanaka may refer to:

- Yudai Tanaka (footballer, born 1988) (田中 雄大), Japanese footballer
- Yudai Tanaka (footballer, born 1995) (田中 雄大), Japanese footballer
- Yudai Tanaka (footballer, born 1999) (田中 雄大), Japanese footballer
