= The Legend of Zelda: Twilight Princess (manga) =

Japanese manga series

- Cover of the first volume of the English release, featuring Link in his Hylian and wolf forms

ゼルダの伝説 トワイライトプリンセス (Zeruda no Densetsu: Towairaito Purinsesu)
- Genre: Adventure; Dark fantasy
- Manga
- Written by: Akira Himekawa
- Published by: Shogakukan
- English publisher: NA: Viz Media
- Magazine: MangaONE
- Original run: February 8, 2016 – January 30, 2022
- Volumes: 11

The Legend of Zelda: Twilight Princess (Note: Japanese: ゼルダの伝説 トワイライトプリンセス, Hepburn: Zeruda no Densetsu: Towairaito Purinsesu) is a Japanese manga series written and illustrated by Akira Himekawa, and is based on the video game of the same name. It was serialized through Shogakukan's MangaONE app from February 2016 to January 2022, and spans fifty-eight chapters across eleven volumes.

== Development ==
After completing manga adaptations of other games from The Legend of Zelda series, the duo Akira Himekawa wanted to adapt The Legend of Zelda: Twilight Princess. Since the game was rated more mature than other games in The Legend of Zelda series, they wanted a weekly magazine to serialize in with a higher-aged target demographic; however, they were unable to find a suitable magazine. After requests from fans, the duo later decided to approach Nintendo again on the hopes of being able to find a magazine, and eventually settled on MangaONE. Due to this new agreement, they were able to make the adaptation longer than previous adaptations, which only lasted for one or two tankōbon volumes.

== Publication ==
In July 2015, the duo Akira Himekawa announced they were working on a new manga adaptation for The Legend of Zelda series. In February 2016, the duo announced the game they would be adapting was The Legend of Zelda: Twilight Princess, and it would start serialization on the MangaONE app and website on February 8, 2016, shortly preceding the release of Twilight Princess HD on Wii U the following month. From November 2017 to February 2018, Himekawa put the series on hiatus in order to "recharge". In May 2020, Himekawa announced that the series had entered its final arc. The series entered its climax in the tenth volume, to be concluded in the eleventh. The final chapter was released on January 30, 2022, with the final volume released the following March.

An English release of the series was first hinted at in May 2016, when Himekawa made a post on their Facebook claiming that Viz Media would publish the series. Three months later at New York Comic Con, Viz Media confirmed they had licensed the series for English publication.

=== Volume list ===
No.	Original release date	Original ISBN	English release date	English ISBN
1	June 24, 2016	978-4-09-142174-6	March 14, 2017	978-1-4215-9347-0
1. "Light and Shadow (Part 1)" (光と影【前編】, Hikari to Kage (Zenpen)); 2. "Light and Shadow (Part 2)" (光と影【後編】, Hikari to Kage (Kōhen)); 3. "Ordon Village" (トアル村, Toaru-mura); 4. "Omens" (兆候, Chōko); 5. "Those Who Come Forth from Shadow" (影より出でる者たち, Kage yori Ideru Mono-tachi); 6. "Link's Past" (リンクの過去, Rinku no Kako); 7. "The Monster Who Devours Fear" (恐怖を食う化け物, Kyōfu o Kū Bakemono); 8. "Into Twilight" (黄昏(トワイライト)へ, Towairaito e)
2	December 28, 2016	978-4-09-142314-6	August 8, 2017	978-1-4215-9656-3
9. "The Wicked One's Execution" (邪悪なるものの処刑, Jaaku naru Mono no Shokei); 10. "Midna" (ミドナ, Midona); 11. "Locked in a Tower" (幽閉塔, Yūheitō); 12. "Wolf Link's Awakening" (ウルフリンク覚醒, Urufu Rinku Kakusei); 13. "Different Ways of Life" (それぞれの生きる道, Sorezore no Ikiru Michi); 14. "To Faron Woods" (フィローネの森へ, Firōne no Mori e); 15. "Twilight Sense" (影の視力, Kage no Shiryoku); 16. "The Hero in Green" (緑衣の勇者, Ryokui no Yūsha); 17. "Bewilderment" (戸惑い, Tomadoi)
3	May 26, 2017	978-4-09-142400-6	March 13, 2018	978-1-4215-9826-0
18. "Quiet Determination" (静かなる決意, Shizuka naru Ketsui); 19. "Kakariko Village" (カカリコ村, Kakariko-mura); 20. "Into Twilight Once More" (再び黄昏の領域(トワイライト)へ, Futatabi Towairaito e); 21. "The Golden Wolf Again" (金色の狼再び, Kin'iro no Ōkami Futatabi); 22. "Life and Death" (生と死と, Sei to Shi to); 23. "True Bravery" (真の勇気, Shin no Yūki); 24. "A Fierce Battle for Someone" (誰がための激闘, Ta ga Tame no Gekitō); 25. "Duel Atop the Bridge of Eldin" (オルディン大橋の一騎打ち, Orudin Ōhachi no Ikkiuchi); 26. "Reversal" (逆転, Gyakuten)
4	December 27, 2017	978-4-09-142594-2	September 11, 2018	978-1-9747-0226-8
27. "The Goron Tribe" (ゴロン族, Goron-zoku); 28. "The Final Twilight" (最後の黄昏(トワイライト), Saigo no Towairaito); 29. "Memory Tracks" (記憶の轍, Kioku no Wadachi); 30. "Lakebed Temple" (湖底の神殿, Kotei no Shinden)
5	August 28, 2018	978-4-09-142758-8	July 9, 2019	978-1-9747-0564-1
31. "Midna Covered in Wounds" (傷だらけのミドナ, Kizudarake no Midona); 32. "The Master Sword" (マスターソード, Masutā Sōdo); 33. "The Resistance" (レジスタンス, Rejisutansu); 34. "Desert Arbiter's Grounds" (砂漠の処刑場, Sabaku no Shokeijō)
6	March 28, 2019	978-4-09-143017-5	January 14, 2020	978-1-9747-1163-5
35. "Snowpeak Ruins" (雪山の廃墟, Yukiyama no Haikyo); 36. "Darkening of Madness" (狂気の暗転, Kyōki no Anten)
7	August 28, 2019	978-4-09-143070-0	August 11, 2020	978-1-9747-1533-6
37. "Invitation to Rebirth" (復活への誘い, Fukkatsu e no Izanai); 38. "Setting Out on a Journey Again" (再びの旅立ち, Futatabi no Tabidachi); 39. "Destiny of the Triforce" (トライフォースの宿命, Toraifōsu no Shukumei); 40. "The Temple Where Time Sleeps" (時の眠る神殿, Toki no Nemuru Shinden)
8	March 27, 2020	978-4-09-143164-6	March 9, 2021	978-1-9747-1982-2
41. "The Temple Where Time Sleeps, Part 2" (時の眠る神殿2, Toki no Nemuru Shinden 2); 42. "The Temple Where Time Sleeps, Part 3" (時の眠る神殿3, Toki no Nemuru Shinden 3); 43. "Attack" (襲撃, Shūgeki); 44. "City in the Sky" (天空都市, Tenkū Toshi); 45. "To the Twilight Realm, Part 1" (影の世界へ1, Kage no Sekai e 1)
9	December 25, 2020	978-4-09-143258-2	September 14, 2021	978-1-9747-2338-6
46. "To the Twilight Realm, Part 2" (影の世界へ2, Kage no Sekai e 2); 47. "Zant the Usurper King" (僭王ザント, Sen'ō Zanto); 48. "Difference" (隔たり, Hedatari)
10	September 28, 2021	978-4-09-143346-6	September 20, 2022	978-1-9747-3404-7
49. "The Power of Shadow" (影の力, Kage no Chikara); 50. "The Lord's Hall, Part 1" (王の広間1, Ō no Hiroma 1); 51. "The Lord's Hall, Part 2" (王の広間2, Ō no Hiroma 2); 52. "The Lord's Hall, Part 3" (王の広間3, Ō no Hiroma 3)
11	March 28, 2022	978-4-09-143395-4	April 11, 2023	978-1-9747-3650-8
53. "The Lord's Hall, Part 4" (王の広間4, Ō no Hiroma 4); 54. "Single Combat, Part 1" (一騎打ち1, Ikkiuchi 1); 55. "Single Combat, Part 2" (一騎打ち2, Ikkiuchi 2); 56. "Single Combat, Part 3" (一騎打ち3, Ikkiuchi 3); 57. "Single Combat, Part 4" (一騎打ち4, Ikkiuchi 4); 58. "A New Departure" (新たなる旅立ち, Arata naru Tabidachi)

== Reception ==
Rebecca Silverman from Anime News Network praised the first volume for it being easy to pick up even for someone who hadn't played the game and the characterization of Link, while criticizing the art for being too dark at times. Nick Smith from ICv2 concurred with Silverman, praising the plot as easy to pick up for anyone, while also praising the artwork. Evan Minato from Otaku USA praised the art and characters, while being critical of the plot, stating it is "too melodramatic". Matthew Warner from The Fandom Post concurred with Silverman and Smith, praising the plot as easy to pick up for anyone and calling it "[overall] an enjoyable ride". Leroy Douresseaux from Comic Book Bin also offered praise for the plot, calling the volume "[a] good read". Demelza from Anime UK News also praised the first volume for both Himekawa's artwork and adaptation of the game's story.

In 2017, Amazon listed the series as one of their best books of 2017 in the comics and graphic novels category. Several of the volumes have ranked on The NPD Group's monthly BookScan's list of top adult graphic novels, such as the first volume ranking third on the 2017 list and the third and fourth volumes ranking third upon their release.
