= Yudai Nagano (footballer) =

Japanese footballer

Personal information
- Full name: Yudai Nagano
- Date of birth: 22 January 1998 (age 28)
- Place of birth: Iizuka Fukuoka, Japan
- Height: 1.63 m (5 ft 4 in)
- Position: Midfielder

Team information
- Current team: Giravanz Kitakyushu
- Number: 11

Youth career
- Giravanz Kitakyushu
- –2019: Hannan University

Senior career*
Years	Team	Apps	(Gls)
2020–2023	Giravanz Kitakyushu	88	(0)
- * Club domestic league appearances and goals as of 18:24, 5 September 2023

Yudai Nagano (永野 雄大, Nagano Yūdai; born 22 January 1998) is a Japanese footballer currently playing as a midfielder for Giravanz Kitakyushu.

== Career statistics ==
=== Club ===
As of 11 September 2021.

Club	Season	League			National Cup		League Cup		Other		Total	
Club	Season	Division	Apps	Goals	Apps	Goals	Apps	Goals	Apps	Goals	Apps	Goals
Giravanz Kitakyushu	2020	J2 League	13	0	0	0	0	0	0	0	13	0
Giravanz Kitakyushu	2021	J2 League	22	0	1	0	0	0	0	0	23	0
Career total			35	0	1	0	0	0	0	0	36	0
