= List of The Legend of Zelda manga =

Comic and manga adaptations of The Legend of Zelda series of video games, especially in Japan, have been published under license from Nintendo.

== Wanpaku Comics ==
In September 1986, Wanpaku Comics published a manga book in Japan titled The Hyrule Fantasy. It was released as a companion to the first The Legend of Zelda video game. The story follows the game's plot but adds additional features including new characters, such as a companion parrot for Link.

== Valiant Comics series ==
Valiant Comics published a comic series simply titled The Legend of Zelda in 1990, which lasted only five issues, with a sixth issue published as part of the Nintendo Comics System imprint. The series was more closely patterned after The Legend of Zelda TV series airing at the time, which in turn was loosely based on the first two NES games. The series depicted Link as he appears in the first game, with red hair and brown eyes. It also introduced new characters, including Captain Krin, Captain of the Guard of North Castle and Link's parents, Arn and Medilia.

== Titles by Ataru Cagiva ==
=== Dreaming Island ===
- Volume 1
  - ISBN 978-4-87025-513-5
  - Release date: May 1994
- Volume 2
  - ISBN 978-4-87025-524-1
  - Release date: September 1994

=== Triforce of the Gods ===
- Original characters
  - Raska: Link's childhood friend, a martial arts enthusiast.
  - Tou: Raska's father. Shares the same enthusiasm for martial arts as Raska.
- Volume 1
  - ISBN 978-4-87025-541-8
  - Release date: May 1995
- Volume 2
  - ISBN 978-4-87025-552-4
  - Release date: November 1995
- Volume 3
  - ISBN 978-4-87025-559-3
  - Release date: April 1996

== Titles by Yuu Mishouzaki ==
- Legend of Zelda
  - ISBN 4-88063-627-4
  - Release date: September 1989
- Adventure of Link
  - ISBN 4-7966-0191-0
  - Release date: August 1991

== Titles by Akira Himekawa ==
The manga team of Akira Himekawa has been producing manga adaptations of The Legend of Zelda video games in Japan beginning with their manga adaptation of Ocarina of Time, which was first published in 1999 by Shogakukan.

Currently, Himekawa has produced manga adaptations of more than eight Zelda games (including both Oracle games), with the latest being Twilight Princess manga. Viz Media is currently publishing English translations of Himekawa's Zelda manga in North America, beginning with their adaptation of Ocarina of Time, which was published in October 2008.

Since July 2009, a French translation is being published by Soleil Manga. The first manga available was A Link to the Past followed by Ocarina of Time 1 & 2. Himekawa's other Zelda manga was later translated into French in 2010.

Himekawa's manga, which was released in Japan in and between 1998 and 2009, was also localised in the Federal Republic of Germany by Tokyopop in and between 2009 and 2011. The first ten tankōbon volumes sold more than 3 million copies worldwide.

After a seven-year hiatus, Akira Himekawa began the work on a new Zelda manga. Later revealed to be an adaptation of Twilight Princess, the manga series ran from February 2016 to January 2022.

=== Ocarina of Time ===
- ISBN 4-09-149601-6 (Volume 1)
- ISBN 4-09-149602-4 (Volume 2)
- ISBN 1-4215-2327-2 (Volume 1, English edition)
- ISBN 1-4215-2328-0 (Volume 2, English edition)

Released in 1998, and the English version in 2008, it is an adaptation of The Legend of Zelda: Ocarina of Time. There are two story arcs in this manga: Child arc (こども編 Kodomo-hen) and Adult arc (おとな編 Otona-hen). The protagonist is Link (リンク Rinku/Link) and during the course of the book he is on a quest to stop Ganondorf (ガノンドロフ Ganondorofu) from taking over Hyrule (ハイラル Hairaru). Princess Zelda (ゼルダ姫 Zeruda/Zelda-hime) helps him in his quest. The book more-or-less follows the same plot as the game, but there are a few differences in plot from the game. There are six chapters in the first book, and nine in the second. Some of the added information in the manga is added to explain certain points; for example, in the manga pierced ears is a traditional rite of Sheikah passage, although this is not included in the game. The series was published in English by Viz Media in North America as Volumes 1 and 2, respectively.

=== Majora's Mask ===
- ISBN 4-09-149603-2
- ISBN 1-4215-2329-9 (English edition)

Released in 2000, and the English version in 2009, it is an adaptation of The Legend of Zelda: Majora's Mask, continuing from where the previous adaptation ended. It is one volume, and the last chapter includes the artist's speculation of where Majora's mask originated. The volume was published in English by Viz Media in North America as Volume 3.

=== Oracle of Seasons and Oracle of Ages ===
Based on Oracle of Seasons and Oracle of Ages, it spans 2 volumes. Oracle of Seasons and Oracle of Ages were published by Viz Media in English in North America as Volumes 4 and 5, respectively.

- ISBN 4-09-149604-0 (Oracle of Seasons)
- ISBN 4-09-149605-9 (Oracle of Ages)
- ISBN 1-4215-2330-2 (Oracle of Seasons, English edition)
- ISBN 1-4215-2331-0 (Oracle of Ages, English edition)

=== Four Swords ===
- ISBN 4-09-149606-7 (Volume 1)
- ISBN 4-09-149607-5 (Volume 2)
- ISBN 1-4215-2332-9 (Volume 1, English edition)
- ISBN 1-4215-2333-7 (Volume 2, English edition)

Based on The Legend of Zelda: Four Swords Adventures, it spans 2 volumes and 12 chapters. The story follows four variants of the hero Link: Green Link, Blue Link, Red Link, and Violet Link (Vio). Included in volume two is an omake. The series is published in English by Viz Media in North America as Volumes 6 and 7, respectively.

=== The Minish Cap ===
- ISBN 4-09-140116-3
- ISBN 1-4215-2334-5 (English edition)

Written by Akira Himekawa and published in early 2006 in Japan, this manga chronicles the adventures of Link in the game of the same name, including a short omake featuring Ezlo and Vaati. Viz released an English adaptation of this manga as Volume 8 of their Zelda series on December 1, 2009.

=== A Link to the Past ===
- ISBN 4-09-149608-3
- ISBN 1-4215-2335-3 (English edition)

A manga adaptation of The Legend of Zelda: A Link to the Past (named Triforce of the Gods in Japan) following the release of the Game Boy Advance port. In its telling, Agahnim is revealed as a friend of Link's father. Agahnim took to magic and learned how to break the Seal of the Sages, being recruited to Ganon's services. When confronted by his friend, Agahnim sent him and his wife into the Dark World.

Viz released an English adaptation of this manga (renamed A Link to the Past to fit the game's North American counterpart) as Volume 9 of their Zelda series on February 2, 2010.

=== Phantom Hourglass ===
- ISBN 1-4215-3724-9 (English edition)

Originally released in Japan in early 2009, it is based on the DS adventure, The Legend of Zelda: Phantom Hourglass, the sequel to Wind Waker. Though the manga retains the game's characters and overall plot, many of the character's personalities and some events in the game were changed, sparking negative reactions from several fans of the original game. Despite this, however, it continues to receive positive reviews. Viz released an English adaptation of this manga as Volume 10 of their Zelda series on September 7, 2010.

=== Skyward Sword ===
The Legend of Zelda: Skyward Sword is a manga loosely based on the game of the same name drawn by Akira Himekawa. The 32 pages of the manga were included in the artbook Hyrule Historia. The manga serves as a prequel to the story of Skyward Sword.

=== Twilight Princess ===
A manga series based on The Legend of Zelda: Twilight Princess, penned and illustrated by Akira Himekawa, was first released on February 8, 2016. The adaptation began almost ten years after the release of the game on which it is based, but only a month before the release of the high-definition remake for the Wii U, Twilight Princess HD. The series concluded in January 2022 with 70 chapters spread across 11 volumes, all of which have since been translated and released into English.

== Other works ==
=== A Link to the Past by Shotaro Ishinomori ===
- ISBN 4-09-174011-1 (Japanese edition)
- ASIN B0006QBMJ6 (English edition)

It was created as a serial comic for Nintendo Power magazine by the acclaimed manga author Shotaro Ishinomori, and later collected in graphic novel form, this told an alternate version of the events from A Link to the Past. Though Link starts out a hapless, bumbling kid, caught up in something bigger than he ever imagined, he displays great courage and ultimately proves himself a determined and competent adventurer. This telling portrays Link's parents as Knights of Hyrule, lost to the Dark World.

=== Novels and Yonkoma manga ===
Five novels (published by Futabasha) and several Yonkoma manga (published by Shiseisha) based on aspects of The Legend of Zelda series have also been published.

=== The Legend of Zelda: The Wind Waker – Link's Logbook ===
This manga is an adaptation of The Wind Waker, but parodies scenarios in the game. Although it adapts most of The Wind Waker, it skips most dungeons and scenes to the very peak of the stories. It was released almost directly after The Wind Waker was released.

=== Penny Arcade Presents The Legend of Zelda: Skyward Sword ===
A short comic published weekly in five parts on Nintendo's official The Legend of Zelda: Skyward Sword website, written and illustrated by Jerry Holkins and Mike Krahulik under their Penny Arcade Presents series. The story is narrated by Gaepora, Zelda's father.

=== Saitaro Komatsu manga ===
Saitaro Komatsu wrote a Japanese manga for CoroCoro Comic. Nintendo published a translated version as a web comic on its Play Nintendo website titled Link's Hijinks to promote Majora's Mask 3D.
