= Akira Himekawa =

Manga artist duo

Akira Himekawa (姫川 明, Himekawa Akira) is the pen name of a duo of female Japanese comic book artists. When writing original works, the pen name is spelled as Akira Himekawa (姫川 明輝, Himekawa Akira)

The artists have worked together since 1991 and have chosen not to reveal their real names. The women are individually pen named A Honda (本田 A) and S Nagano (長野 S). They were previously individually pen named Akira Karitaka (狩鷹 明, Karitaka Akira) and Nui Ono (小野 ぬい, Ono Nui).

== Bibliography ==
- 556 Lab
- Hiuri
- The Dragon Dreams of Twilight (2011 manga)
- Astro Boy (2003 manga)
- The Immortal Hero (Fumetsu no Hero) (2013 short manga)
- Nazca
- Doggy Maggy Animal School
- New Generation Racer Mini 4 Kids (aka Mini 4 Kids)
- Ride On!
- The Legend of Zelda manga series
- The Legend of Zelda: Twilight Princess
- Gliding Reki, a jury recommendation from the 2007 Japan Media Arts Festival
- Gold Ring (Written by Qais Sedki, drawn by Himekawa)
- Legend of Crystania: The First Adventurers
- Kamudo
