= The Legend of Zelda: Link's Awakening (2019 video game) =

Action-adventure game

- Icon artwork, featuring Link on Koholint Island
- Developer: Grezzo
- Publisher: Nintendo
- Director: Mikiharu Oiwa
- Producer: Eiji Aonuma
- Artist: Masaki Yasuda
- Composer: Ryō Nagamatsu
- Series: The Legend of Zelda
- Platform: Nintendo Switch
- Release: September 20, 2019
- Genre: Action-adventure
- Mode: Single-player

The Legend of Zelda: Link's Awakening (Note: Known in Japan as Zelda no Densetsu: Yume o Miru Shima (Japanese: ゼルダの伝説 夢をみる島, Hepburn: Zeruda no Densetsu: Yume o Miru Shima; lit. "The Legend of Zelda: The Dreaming Island")) is a 2019 action-adventure game developed by Grezzo and published by Nintendo. Link's Awakening is a remake of the 1993 game of the same name for the Game Boy, and is the second game in The Legend of Zelda series for the Nintendo Switch after The Legend of Zelda: Breath of the Wild. It retains the original's top-down perspective and gameplay, along with elements from the 1998 re-release Link's Awakening DX.

The game features a new art style in contrast to the previous games in the series. The gameplay is presented as a "retro-modern" art style with toy-like character designs, diorama-like world designs, and tilt-shift visuals that evoke the original game's presentation on the Game Boy. The opening and credits cutscenes are presented akin to anime. It also features customizable dungeons which the player can create and then complete for rewards.

Link's Awakening received generally positive reviews for its improved gameplay and faithfulness to the original game, though its technical issues were criticized. As of December 2022, the game has sold over 6.46 million copies worldwide, making it one of the best-selling games on the Nintendo Switch.

== Gameplay ==
The Legend of Zelda: Link's Awakening is an action-adventure game with a top-down perspective. Its story is set on Koholint Island, where Link, the player character, is stranded after his ship is caught up in a storm. After being rescued by a girl named Marin, Link embarks on a quest to collect the eight instruments of the Sirens and awaken Koholint's legendary Wind Fish in order to escape the island. Similar to other Zelda games, the player traverses an open world with dungeons scattered throughout, featuring puzzle-solving sections and boss fights, along with trading sidequests. In contrast to other top-down games in the series however, Link's Awakening allows the player to jump over obstacles and onto platforms, and also features side-scrolling platforming sections.

The "Color Dungeon" from Link's Awakening DX, which features color-based action and puzzle gameplay, is included. In the Link's Awakening remake, Link's sword, shield, and upgrades are permanently equipped, allowing more items to be equipped to action buttons in comparison to the original game. Various minigames also received updates, such as realistic physics in the claw crane minigame. As players progress in the game, rooms from completed dungeons can be collected as pieces that the player can use to reassemble their own dungeons by visiting the non-player character Dampé at his shack. The player can then complete these dungeons in a time attack mode to earn rewards such as a life-replenishing fairy bottle, contributing to an increased replay value over the original game.

Players can also unlock "plus-effects", which can be added to customized dungeons to enhance their gameplay. The Link figurine from the Link's Awakening series of Amiibo offers a unique plus-effect, summoning Shadow Link to chase the player through the dungeon; defeating Shadow Link increases the value of rewards earned upon completing the dungeon. Other figurines from the Zelda series of Amiibo and Zelda-themed figurines from the Super Smash Bros. series of Amiibo will unlock a random one of five special chambers in Link's Awakening, which cannot otherwise be obtained in game.

== Development ==
Dungeon rooms designed for the original game's 1:1 presentation on the Game Boy do not fill the remake's widescreen presentation.

The Legend of Zelda: Link's Awakening is a remake of the 1993 game developed for the Game Boy. Link's Awakening had previously been remastered for the Game Boy Color in 1998 as The Legend of Zelda: Link's Awakening DX. While the original game was presented in 2D graphics in an almost square ratio on the Game Boy, the remake is presented in 3D graphics and a widescreen ratio on the Nintendo Switch. Some sections of the game's dungeons do not fill the width of the screen though, as certain puzzles and boss fights were designed to work with the tile count of the game's original square ratio.

The game adopts a "retro-modern" art style distinct from other Zelda games, departing from the original game's A Link to the Past-inspired art style while retaining its simplicity. The toy-like plasticine character designs also depart from the Wind Waker-inspired designs typical of many top-down Zelda games since the release of Four Swords Adventures. It features a tilt-shift effect that exaggerates the camera's perspective and depth of field. The effect was inspired by the appearance of the original game's "small [...] but very vast" world on the Game Boy's 66 millimeter screen; series producer Eiji Aonuma chose a diorama-like art style to help achieve this effect.

Dampé's shack, which houses the player's customized "Chamber Dungeons", replaced the Camera Shop from Link's Awakening DX, which served as a Game Boy Printer hub. The idea for Chamber Dungeons came after Shigeru Miyamoto inquired with Aonuma about the possibility of implementing Super Mario Maker-like gameplay into the Zelda series. Feeling that simply allowing players to create their own dungeon would be too difficult, Aonuma instead introduced Chamber Dungeons, by way of letting players rearrange existing dungeons as a way of achieving this goal – repurposing them as puzzles themselves for players to solve.

While the original game and DX use simple sprite-based graphics for the cutscenes due to the limitations of the Game Boy and Game Boy Color, the remake features hand-drawn animated cutscenes, directed and storyboarded by Junichi Yamamoto. Oswald Katou handled the concept art, backgrounds, and color design.

== Release ==
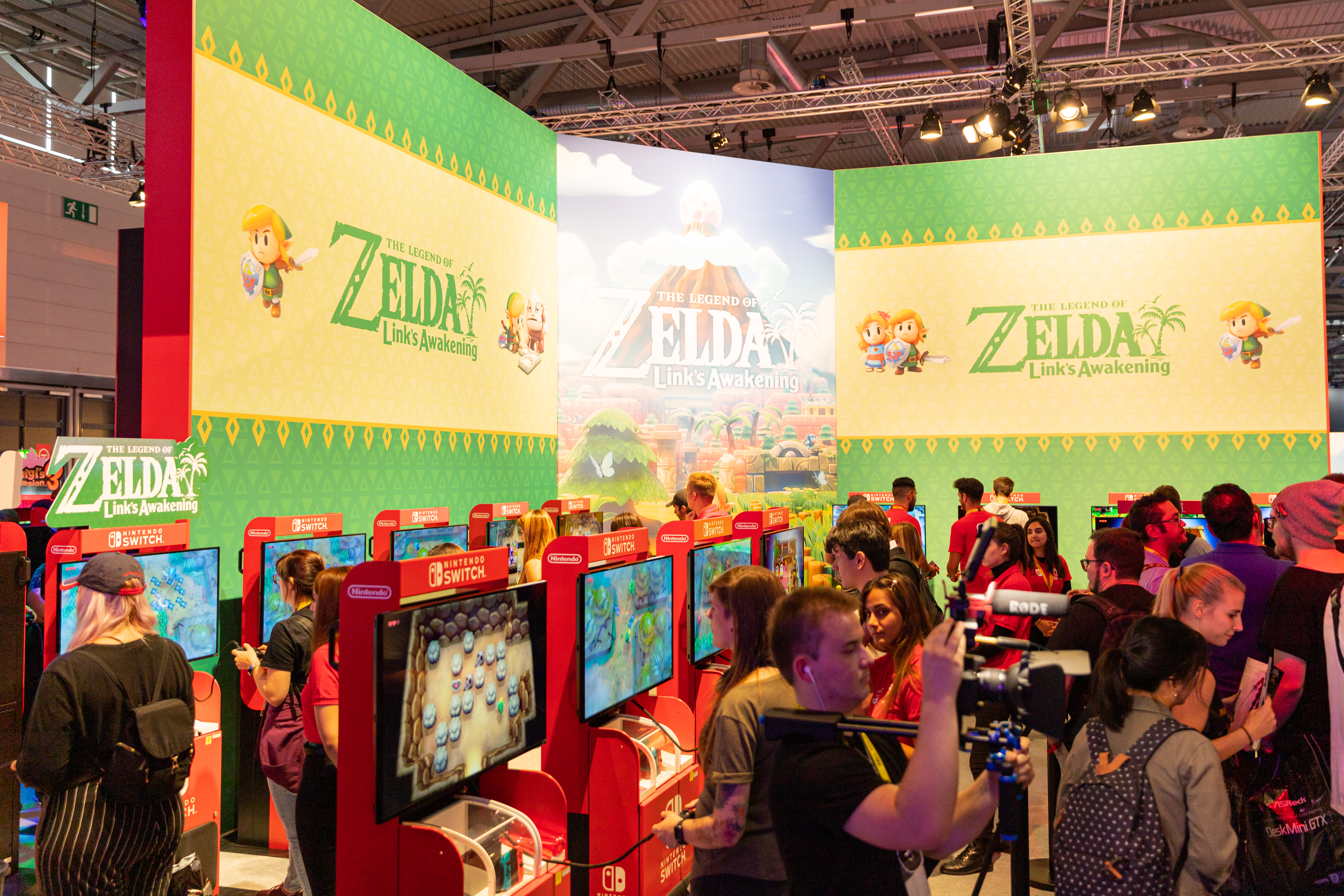
Demo booth at Gamescom 2019

The Legend of Zelda: Link's Awakening was announced via a trailer showcased during a Nintendo Direct presentation in February 2019, and was showcased with a demo at E3 expo that June. The game is published by Nintendo, and was released on September 20, 2019, distributed digitally via the Nintendo eShop, and on physical game cards through third-party retailers. The game was the second most trending game in the eShop on the day of release, only being surpassed by Untitled Goose Game. A "Dreamer Edition" of Link's Awakening included the physical version of the game packaged with a Dreamer Art Book featuring concept art. A "Limited Edition" exclusive to Europe included the physical version of the game encased in a Game Boy-themed SteelBook packaged with an expanded 120-page art book. A limited two-sided poster of the game was given out to those who pre-ordered at select retailers. A Link's Awakening-series Amiibo figurine of Link was released simultaneously with the game, replicating the character's design as he appears in Link's Awakening. Aonuma described it as the first Amiibo figurine to faithfully replicate Link's in-game appearance.

== Reception ==
Reception

Aggregate scores
| Aggregator | Score |
|---|---|
| Metacritic | 87/100 |
| OpenCritic | 95% recommend |

Review scores
| Publication | Score |
|---|---|
| 4Players | 90% |
| Destructoid | 9/10 |
| Easy Allies | 9/10 |
| Electronic Gaming Monthly | 8/10 |
| Eurogamer | Essential |
| Famitsu | 9/10, 9/10, 9/10, 8/10 |
| Game Informer | 9/10 |
| GameRevolution | 3/5 |
| GameSpot | 8/10 |
| GamesRadar+ | 4/5 |
| Hardcore Gamer | 4/5 |
| IGN | 9.4/10 |
| Jeuxvideo.com | 15/20 |
| Nintendo Life | 9/10 |
| Nintendo World Report | 8.5/10 |
| Pocket Gamer | 4.5/5 |
| RPGamer | 4/5 |
| Shacknews | 9/10 |
| The Guardian | 4/5 |
| USgamer | 5/5 |
| VentureBeat | 95/100 |
| VG247 | 4/5 |
| VideoGamer.com | 9/10 |

The Legend of Zelda: Link's Awakening received "generally favorable" reviews, according to review aggregator website Metacritic. Fellow review aggregator OpenCritic assessed that the game received "mighty" approval, being recommended by 95% of critics. In Japan, four critics from Famitsu gave the game a total score of 35 out of 40. Most critics agreed that the main game needed little change, but that the quality of life updates were welcome. Forbes's review states that Link's Awakening is "an excellent remake of an already faultless Zelda game". While USgamer stated that the remake "improves most of the flaws" from the Game Boy version while maintaining what made it a classic in the first place, they did note that "slowdown issues pop up from time to time".

=== Sales ===
Link's Awakening launched at #1 on the UK, Japanese, and EMEAA physical all-format charts, becoming Grezzo's biggest debut and the fastest-selling Switch game of 2019. It sold 141,375 physical copies in Japan and 430,000 copies in Europe during its first three days on sale. As of December 2019, the game sold 250,947 physical copies in Japan. As of March 2021, the game has sold 5.49 million copies worldwide. The 2023 CESA Games White Papers revealed that the game had sold 6.46 million units, as of December 2022.

=== Awards ===
| Year | Award | Category | Result | Ref. |
|---|---|---|---|---|
| 2019 | 2019 Game Critics Awards | Best Console Game | Nominated | |
| 2019 | 2019 Game Critics Awards | Best Action/Adventure Game | Nominated | |
| 2019 | Gamescom 2019 | Best Action-Adventure Game | Nominated | |
| 2019 | Gamescom 2019 | Best Nintendo Switch Game | Won | |
| 2019 | 2019 Golden Joystick Awards | Nintendo Game of the Year | Nominated | |
| 2019 | The Game Awards 2019 | Best Art Direction | Nominated | |
| 2019 | The Game Awards 2019 | Best Action/Adventure Game | Nominated | |
| 2020 | New York Game Awards | Freedom Tower Award for Best Remake | Nominated | |
| 2020 | 23rd Annual D.I.C.E. Awards | Adventure Game of the Year | Nominated | |
| 2020 | NAVGTR Awards | Gameplay Design, Franchise | Won | |
| 2020 | NAVGTR Awards | Game, Classic Revival | Nominated | |
| 2020 | NAVGTR Awards | Original Light Mix Score, Franchise | Won | |
| 2020 | SXSW Gaming Awards | Excellence in Art | Won | |
| 2020 | 16th British Academy Games Awards | Music | Nominated | |
| 2020 | Famitsu Dengeki Game Awards 2019 | Best Action Adventure Game | Nominated | |

== Bibliography ==
- Marks, Tom (February 14, 2019). "Every Art Style Zelda Games Have Ever Had". IGN.
- Nintendo of America (June 11, 2019). The Legend of Zelda: Link's Awakening Gameplay - Nintendo Treehouse: Live - E3 2019 (video).
