= List of Game Boy accessories =

Overview of Game Boy accessories

This is a list of video game accessories that have been released for the Game Boy handheld console and its successors. Accessories add functionality that the console would otherwise not have.

== Game Boy ==
=== Game Boy Pocket Sonar ===
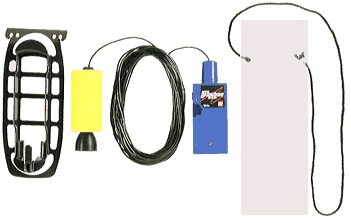
The component parts of the Pocket Sonar

The Game Boy Pocket Sonar is a peripheral for the Nintendo Game Boy made by Bandai that used sonar to locate fish up to 20 meters (65 feet) underwater for the sport of fishing and contained a fishing mini-game. It was released only in Japan in 1998. It was the first sonar-enabled gaming accessory.

=== Game Boy camera and printer ===
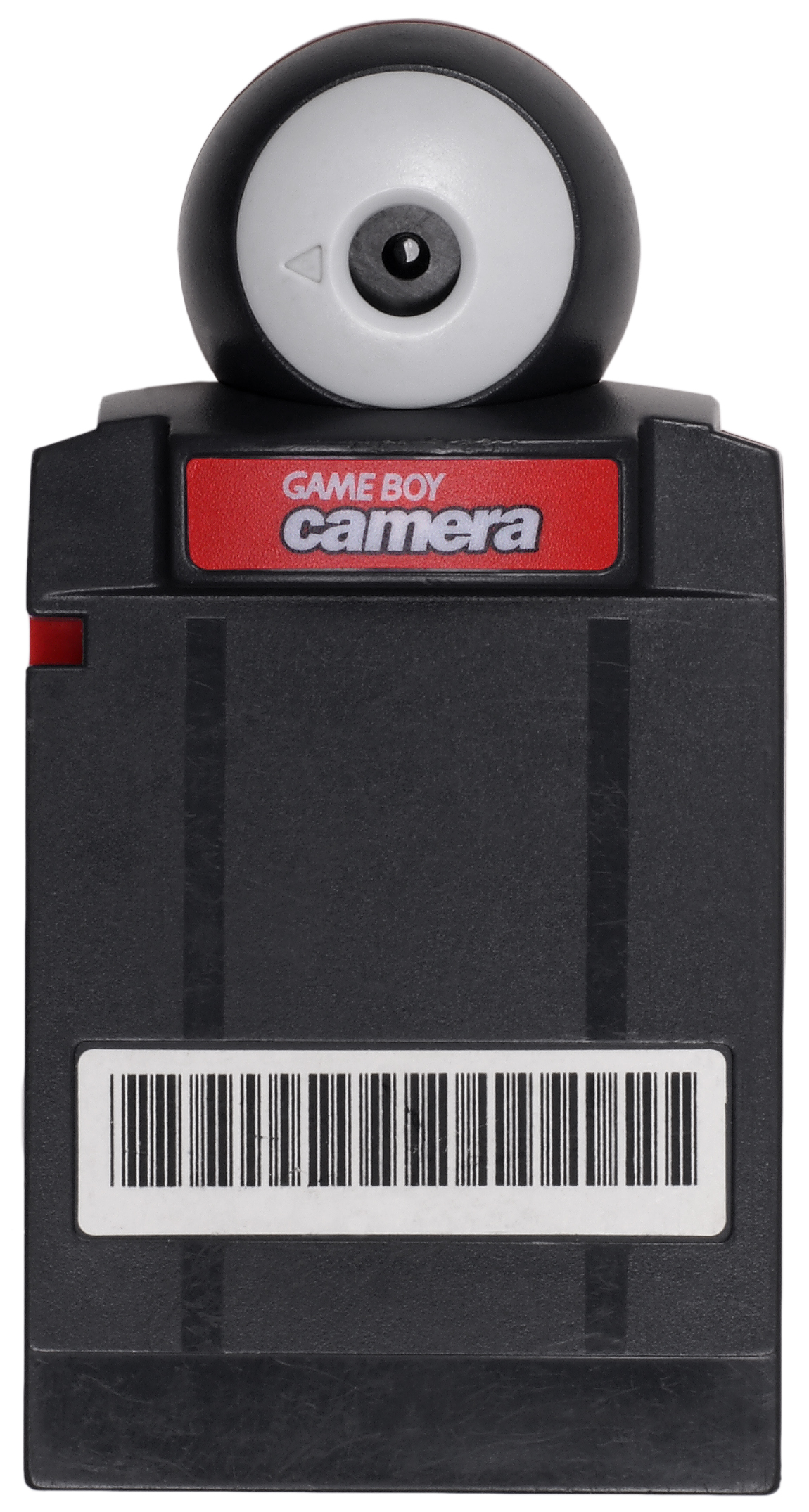
The Game Boy Camera was a rudimentary digital camera.

The Game Boy Camera and Game Boy Printer (Pocket Camera and Pocket Printer in Japan) are accessories for the Game Boy handheld gaming system and were released in 1998. The camera can take basic, often grainy, black-and-white digital images using the four-color palette of the Game Boy system. The printer utilizes thermal paper to "burn" saved images, making a hard copy. There are also several minigames built into the camera itself. A picture of the player's face is used as an avatar in the minigames. Both accessories were marketed by Nintendo as light-hearted entertainment devices in all three major video game regions of the world: Japan, North America, and Europe. The former N64 Magazine went so far as to dedicate a monthly section to the devices.

The camera cartridge is inserted directly into the cartridge slot of a Game Boy Pocket, while the printer must be connected via a second generation Game Link Cable. Both accessories are also compatible with the original Game Boy, Game Boy Pocket, Game Boy Light, the Super Famicom's Super Game Boy 2, Game Boy Color, Game Boy Advance (original and SP), and the GameCube's Game Boy Player. Additionally, the Game Boy Camera is compatible with the original Super Game Boy, whereas the Game Boy Printer is not, because the printer must connect via a Game Link Cable. In order to connect to the original Game Boy, the printer must use a Universal Game Link Adapter. Besides being used for printing Game Boy Camera pictures, the Game Boy Printer can also be used on its own with certain Game Boy Color games, including Super Mario Bros. Deluxe, The Legend of Zelda: Link's Awakening DX, Donkey Kong Country, and Pokémon versions Yellow, Gold, Silver, and Crystal.

The Japanese version of the Game Boy Camera can be utilized in the Mario Artist suite of multimedia games for 64DD, via the Transfer Pak. Users can map photographs of their own faces onto 2D paintings and 3D animated avatars.

While the European and standard North American versions of the Game Boy Camera are essentially the same, they vary slightly from both the Japanese version (in more than just language) and the US-exclusive limited-edition gold Zelda version. Both also differ from the Japan Exclusive Golden Diddy Kong version.

Nintendo reportedly had plans to release a successor to the Game Boy Camera called the GameEye for the Game Boy Advance, which would have taken color photos and featured connectivity with the Nintendo GameCube, but the GameEye never saw a release.

=== Super Game Boy ===
The Super Game Boy is a plug-in cartridge for the Super NES that allows Game Boy and black cartridge Game Boy Color games to be played on a television screen. It was released in 1994. The black-and-white games can be colorized by mapping colors to each of the four shades of gray making up the Game Boy's color palette. There are also special Super Game Boy labeled Game Boy games that contain custom palettes and borders that only show up when played on a Super Game Boy. A 1998 follow-up released only in Japan, the Super Game Boy 2, includes different default borders, different music for the credits, and a link cable port, enabling support for multiplayer gaming and the Game Boy Printer.

=== Transfer Pak ===
The Transfer Pak, known in Japan as the 64 GB Pack, is a peripheral that plugs into the Nintendo 64 controller to transfer data between supported Nintendo 64 games and Game Boy or Game Boy Color games. While primarily designed to exchange data between games, the Pokémon Stadium series was capable of emulating connected Pokémon Game Boy games for play on the television. The Transfer Pak was released in Japan in August 1998, bundled with the game Pocket Monsters' Stadium, and in North America and Europe in March and April 2000 respectively, where it was similarly bundled with Pokémon Stadium.

=== Game Link Cable ===
The Nintendo Game Link Cable is used to link two or more systems in the Game Boy line of handhelds for multiplayer gaming. Games such as the Pokémon series use the Game Link Cable to transfer data between linked cartridges. Several different variations of Game Link Cables were produced as different Game Boy models had different link cable ports. Various adapters were also produced to interlink different Game Boy models. These variations and adapters are explained in the main article.

=== Game Boy Four Player Adapter ===
The Game Boy Four Player Adapter was designed to allow up to four players to play certain Game Boy games on the original Game Boy. The Game Boy Four Player Adapter consists of a small, gray hub with a single connector cable attached to connect to the first player's Game Boy. The second, third, and fourth players must each use their own Game Link Cables to connect their Game Boys to each of the three link cable ports on the main hub. Theoretically, using the proper Game Link Cables and adapters, this device is compatible with Game Boy consoles all the way up to the Game Boy Advance SP. However, the device is only compatible with a select few original Game Boy games, and will not work for Game Boy Color or Game Boy Advance games on the aforementioned systems. Since Game Boy Micro is not backwards compatible with original Game Boy games, the Game Boy Four Player Adapter is incompatible with it.

=== Game Boy Battery Pack ===
The Game Boy Battery Pack sold for about US$30. The battery peripheral itself is roughly 3 in. long, 2 in. wide, and 0.5 in. thick. One end sprouts a thin cable that ends by being plugged into the external power jack of the Game Boy, while the other end connects to a standard mains plug. The first version of it is gray with purple lettering, to match the colors used on the Game Boy. It also features a belt clip. The battery pack was good for several hours of gameplay per charge, providing an alternative to purchasing more AA batteries once their power had exhausted. The product used nickel-cadmium batteries, lasted about 4–5 hours per charge, and could be charged roughly 1000 times before a significant loss in effectiveness. A major drawback of the battery pack is its weight, as well as the way the plug stuck out prominently from the side of the Game Boy.

=== Handy Boy ===
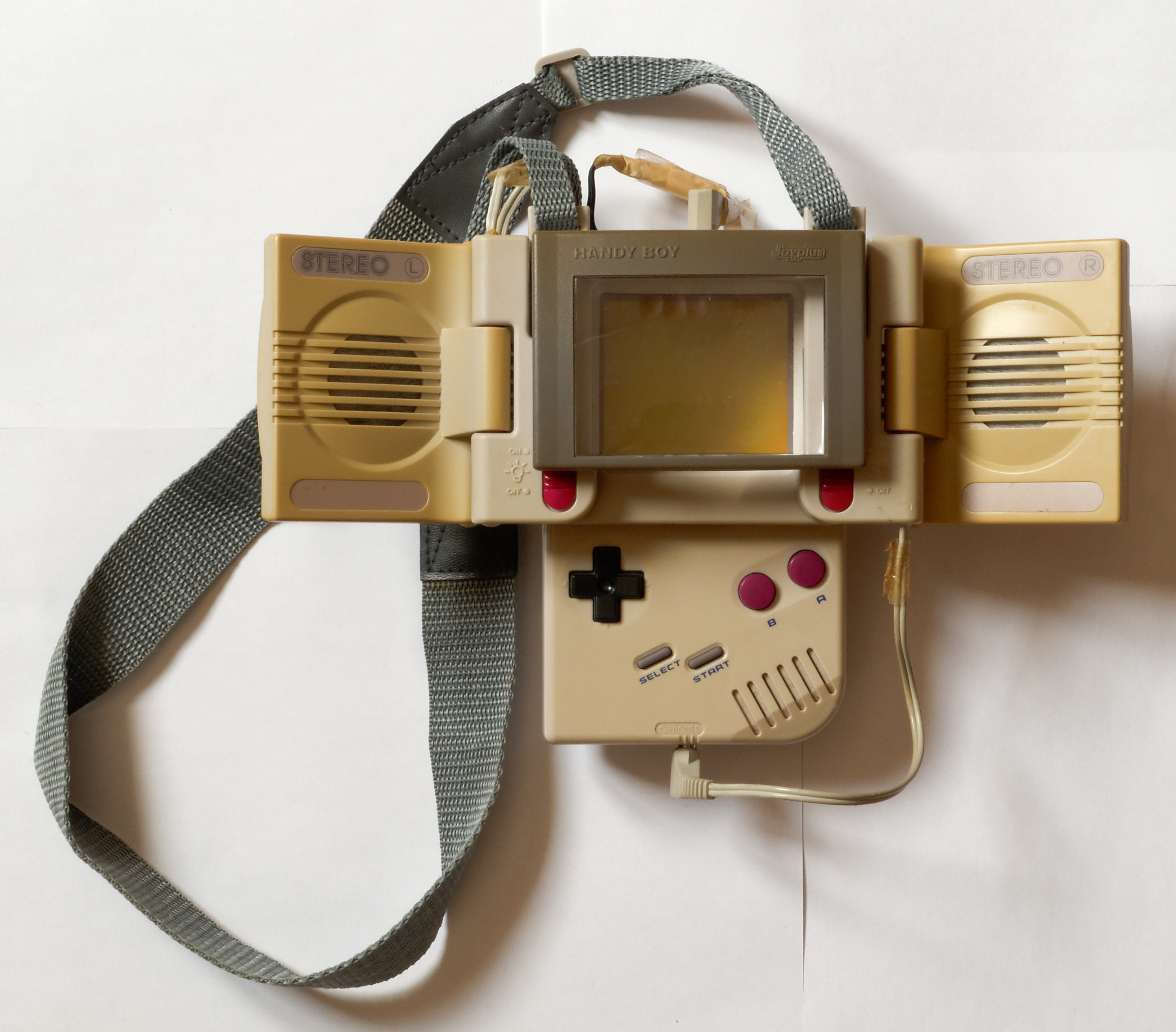
The Handy Boy attached to a Game Boy

The Joyplus Handy Boy is an official "all in one accessory" for the original Game Boy, manufactured by STD. It features two amplified external speakers that are positioned on each side of the screen. The Handy Boy adds a square magnifier which has simple light for illumination. These parts can fold together for travel. Additionally, a thumb joystick can be clipped onto the Game Boy with or without the speakers and magnifier.

== Game Boy Color ==
=== Jaguar/Singer Sewing Machines ===
Jaguar International released the "Nuyell" sewing machine (with a later deluxe model) in early 2000, with the Singer Corporation licensing and selling it as the "Izek" later that same year. There also existed a deluxe model of the "Nuyell", notably including a Game Boy Pocket. The sewing machines allowed the user to connect using a Game Boy Color and the cartridges that came with the machine. This allowed the user to embroider various letters and shapes and was designed to be a control interface, not a game. Jaguar International later released a new model, the "Nuotto", with significantly more features. One add-on cartridge created for this model by Jaguar was Mario Family, which allowed users to embroider a variety of characters from the Mario series of games. A similar game based on the Kirby franchise, Kirby Family, was developed but never released, though a ROM of the game surfaced in the 2020 Nintendo data leak.

=== Magic Card ===
The Magic Card is an accessory that is used to change the color on a regular GB game on a GBC.

=== Boom Box Boy ===
The Boom Box Boy, or the Game Boy FM Radio, is an accessory that plugs into the Link Cable port on the side of the unit. There are buttons to scan for radio stations or reset the scanning, volume control, and a headphone jack. It could also be used with the Game Boy Pocket.

=== Mobile Adapter GB ===
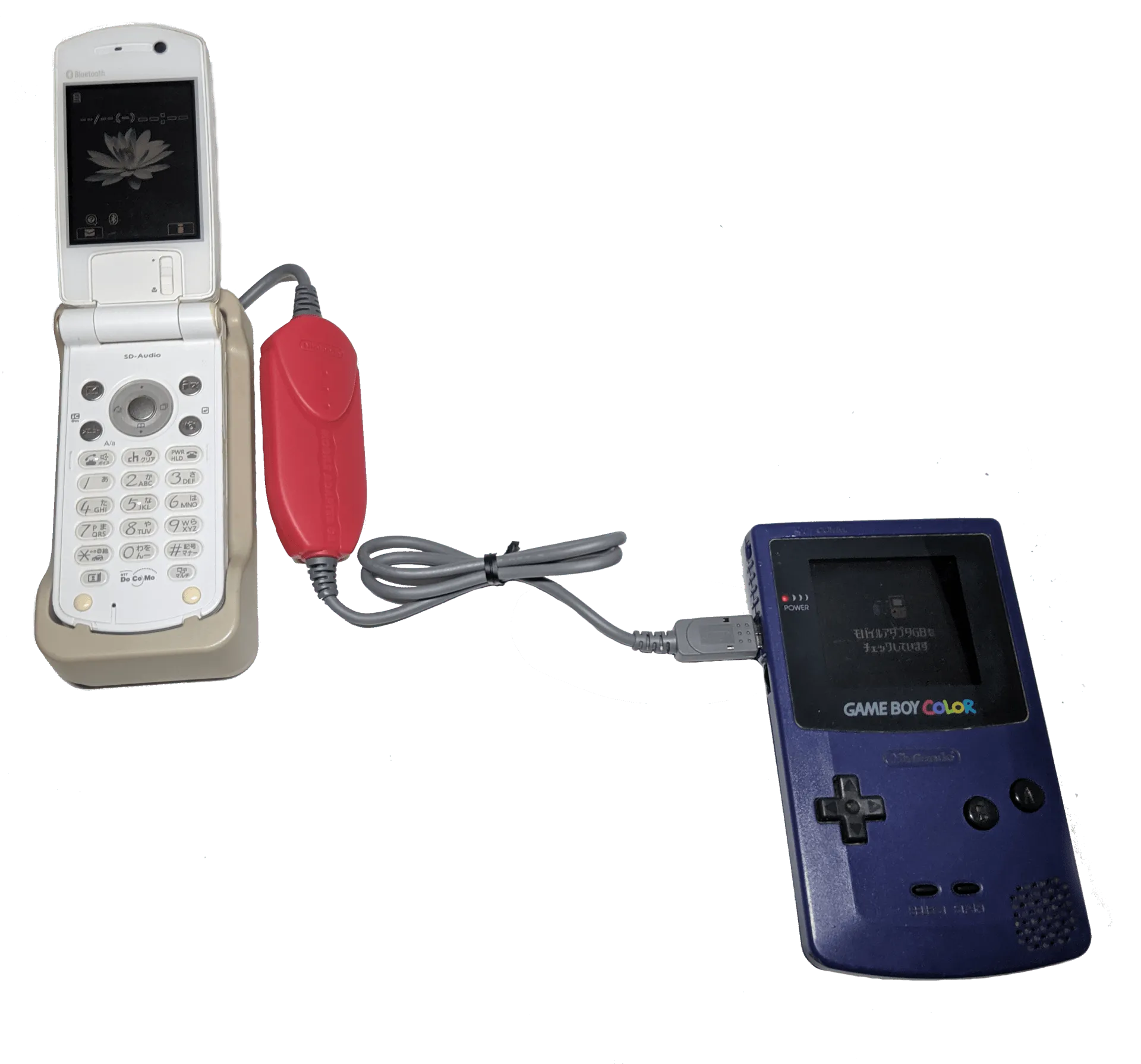
Mobile Adapter GB connecting a Game Boy Color and mobile phone

The Mobile Adapter GB, was a short-lived peripheral that allowed the handheld Game Boy Color and Game Boy Advance consoles to connect to a mobile phone, utilizing its cellular network for online interactions via the Mobile System GB service. Following delays, the device and service launched in Japan on 27 January 2001. Together, they enabled online functionality for roughly 20 games, most notably Pokémon Crystal and Mobile Golf. Nintendo ultimately chose not to release the adapter outside Japan, citing international wireless incompatibilities and market differences. Its high costs and limited game compatibility hindered widespread adoption, with only 80,000 units sold in its first year. The Mobile System GB service was discontinued on 18 December 2002.

== Game Boy Advance ==
=== GameCube Game Boy Advance Cable ===
The GameCube Game Boy Advance Cable is a link cable used to connect the GameCube and the Game Boy Advance. This provides an opportunity for added gameplay in certain GameCube and Game Boy advance games. Minigames can be downloaded to the Game Boy Advance, the Game Boy Advance may be used as an extra screen to supplement gameplay, or the Game Boy Advance can be used as an enhanced GameCube controller. One end of the link cable plugs into a GameCube controller port, and the other end plugs into the Game Boy Advance's link cable port. The cable is only compatible with the GameCube, Nintendo Wii, Game Boy Advance, Game Boy Advance SP, Game Boy Player, and e-Reader. The cable does not work with the Game Boy Micro, as the Micro has a non-standard link cable port. However, the Game Boy Micro Game Link Cable and GameCube Game Boy Advance Cable can be modified and spliced together in order to support compatibility with the Game Boy Micro.

=== Game Boy Player ===
Released in June 2003 as the spiritual successor to the Super Game Boy, the Game Boy Player allows Game Boy, Game Boy Color, and Game Boy Advance games to be played on a television screen via the GameCube. The add-on attaches to the GameCube's base through the "Hi Speed" port on the bottom and requires a boot disc to operate. On the front of the Game Boy Player is a link cable port, offering support for multiplayer gameplay, Game Boy Printer, and expanded e-Reader functionality. Essentially a Game Boy Advance designed to output to a television, the Game Boy Player uses the same colorization hardware and methods as the handheld system. Some Game Boy Advance games, such as Mario & Luigi Superstar Saga, have enhanced gameplay (such as force feedback) when played on the Game Boy Player, while the Game Boy Advance Video series is intentionally incompatible with the Game Boy Player due to concerns of piracy.

=== e-Reader ===
The e-Reader is a card reader add-on released for the Game Boy Advance in 2002. The add-on is plugged directly into the cartridge slot of the Game Boy Advance. Its main function is scanning e-Reader cards to play minigames and ported NES games, or to unlock special content for certain Game Boy Advance and GameCube games. There is only one version of the e-Reader outside Japan, but there are two Japanese versions. Japan's first version of the add-on came without a link cable port among other things. But the second version (e-Reader+ in Japan, simply "e-Reader" in Australia and North America) came with a few improvements, including a new link cable port allowing support for multiplayer gameplay and the GameCube Game Boy Advance Cable. These improvements add extra functionality that can be taken advantage of using link cables with games like Pokémon Ruby and Sapphire.

=== Game Boy Advance Infra-Red Adapter ===
Exclusive to Cyberdrive Zoids, this adapter was not sold separately and is incompatible with the Game Boy Micro.

=== Game Boy Advance Wireless Adapter ===
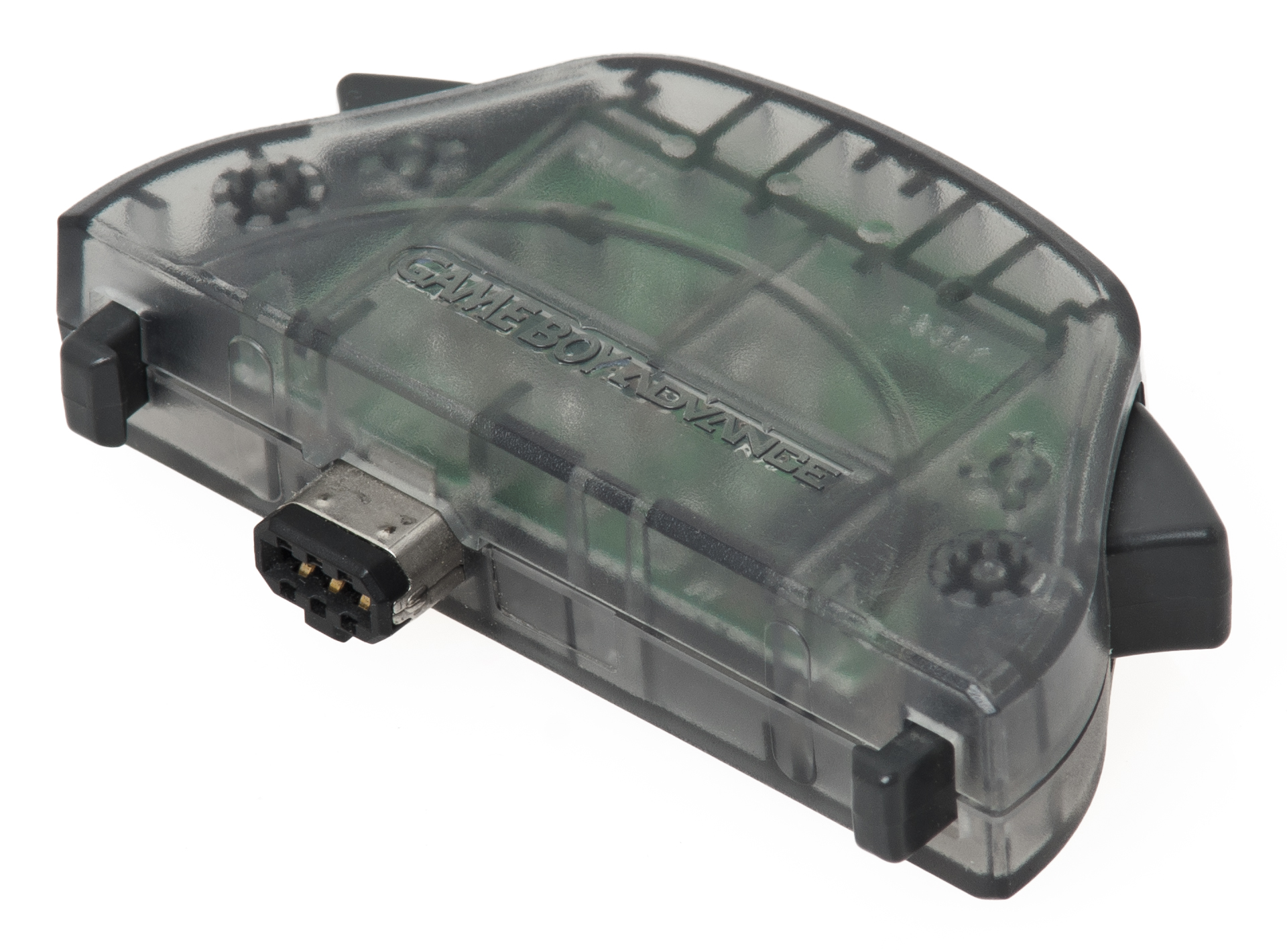
The Wireless Adapter was packed in with Pokémon FireRed and LeafGreen.

The Game Boy Advance Wireless Adapter allows Game Boy Advance players to link Wirelessly for multiplayer gameplay. It is compatible with roughly 45 Game Boy Advance games, including the Classic NES Series. One of the most notable uses of the adapter is found in Pokémon FireRed, LeafGreen, and Pokémon Emerald, where up to 30 wireless adapter-connected players can convene in a virtual in-game lobby called the "Union Room." When the Game Boy Advance is turned on without a game cartridge inside, the Game Boy Advance Wireless Search Engine will appear, where the device will use its wireless capabilities to search for another Game Boy Advance within range that is using the wireless adapter. The adapter is compatible with the Game Boy Advance, Game Boy Advance SP, and Game Boy Player, but it does not fit the Game Boy Micro's different style link cable port; a separate Game Boy Micro Wireless Adapter was released for this purpose, and is otherwise identical to the original model in functionality and compatibility.

=== Game Boy Advance SP headphone adapter ===
The Game Boy Advance SP Headphone Adapter allows headphones with a 3.5mm phone connector to be used on the Game Boy Advance SP, due to its lack of a standard headphone jack. This adapter connects into the EXT2 port of the SP. The Nintendo brand adapter was only available by directly ordering it from Nintendo, though many third-party companies offered their own version with their accessory packs. This accessory also works with the original DS, however, use in this way is unnecessary because the DS already has a headphone jack.

=== Headphones ===
Majesco released a set of Nintendo-branded headphones designed for use with the Game Boy Advance SP, in connjunction with their Game Boy Advance Video product line. Similar to the headphone adapter, the headphones connect to the system through the EXT2 port. Nintendo Power briefly offered a branded version of the headphones as a free subscription gift.

=== Play-Yan ===
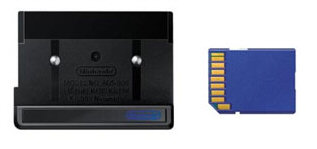
The Play-Yan with an SD memory card

The Play-Yan is an MP3 and MPEG-4 player add-on for the Game Boy Advance SP, Nintendo DS, DS Lite, and Game Boy Micro. Music and video files stored on an SD memory card can be loaded into a slot on the right side of the Play-Yan, which resembles a Game Boy Advance game cartridge. The Play-Yan is loaded directly into the Game Boy Advance game slot of a compatible system. The adapter has its own integrated headphone port but uses the parent console's power supply, controls, and display. The Play-Yan is advertised as offering sixteen hours of MP3 playback and four hours of MPEG-4 playback on a fully charged Game Boy Advance SP. In addition to multimedia playback, the Play-Yan offers support for minigames which could be downloaded from Nintendo of Japan's website.

The device was never released in the United States, though since the Play-Yan (and its successor the Play-Yan Micro) are region-free, it can be imported to other regions and played on any Game Boy Advance.

To accompany the 13 September 2005 release of the Game Boy Micro in Japan, Nintendo released an updated version of the original Play-Yan called the Play-Yan Micro for 5,000 yen. The new version is compatible with all of the same systems, and it looks and works the same as the original, but there are a few noticeable differences. The Play-Yan Micro has the added functionality of MP4 and ASF playback, and it has an updated user interface and improved sound quality through its headphone port. Minigame support, however, was removed from the Play-Yan Micro. The Play-Yan Micro was only available through Nintendo of Japan's online store, and for an additional 1,000 yen, it came with a computer application on CD called "MediaStage Ver. 4.2 for Nintendo" for managing music and video files on a PC.

=== Afterburner ===
The Afterburner is an internal front-lighting system manufactured by Triton Labs and released in mid-2002. The installation consists of disassembling the system, removing some plastic from the interior of the case, attaching the lighting mechanism to the screen, and soldering two wires to the motherboard for power. Optionally, a potentiometer or an integrated circuit could be added to allow adjusting the brightness of the light. When the initial version of the Game Boy Advance SP was released, it included a very similar integrated lighting system. This was replaced in the subsequent version of the Game Boy Advance SP with a backlit display. According to Triton Labs, the Afterburner achieved considerable success during the lifespan of the GBA, with many gamers buying it. Though the kit voids the system's warranty, the company had minor trouble keeping up with demand for the accessory during the 2002 holiday season.

=== Glucoboy ===
The Glucoboy was a blood glucose monitor with integrated games, released in Australia to support children with diabetes.

=== WormCam ===
A Nyko-manufactured camera that attached to the top of the Game Boy Advance and connected via the link port. It can take color pictures and connect to a PC, has a "SpyCam" mode, and can store up to 20 images. Images could be transferred to a computer using a USB cable and software.

=== Campho Advance ===
Released in July 2004, the Campho Advance was a camera accessory manufactured by Digital Act, used for making video phone calls. By plugging the Campho Advance into the cartridge slot and connecting it to a phone line, users could transfer 110,000 pixel video at five frames per second to another user during calls. The accessory received a very limited release, with only 10,000 units manufactured.

=== DREAMGEAR ===
The DreamGear was a booster pack for the Advance SP that came with many accessories such as a radio tuner, a magnifier for the screen, a headphone jack, grips and a pair of headphones.

== Unreleased accessories ==
=== WorkBoy ===
The WorkBoy was a small device with a keyboard that would have connected to a Game Boy via its link cable port, allowing the handheld to be used like a personal digital assistant. The WorkBoy was designed by Source Research and Development and prototypes were produced by Fabtek. The unit was shown at the 1992 Consumer Electronics Show and had been planned for release in late 1992 but according to Frank Ballouz, Fabtek's president, the product was canceled after Nintendo lowered the price of the Game Boy to around what Fabtek was hoping to charge for their device. Only one prototype of the WorkBoy hardware is confirmed to exist, which was located to be within the possession of Frank Ballouz by video game historian Liam Robertson in a 2020 video documentary. Robertson used Ballouz's prototype and a ROM of the corresponding software found in the Nintendo data leak to publicly demonstrate the device's functionality.

=== PediSedate ===
The PediSedate is a patented device that was aimed for use in hospitals to help children relax when they are about to be put under for surgery or a medical procedure. It is a pair of headphones that plugs into a Game Boy and has a cup that goes over the child's nose and releases the anesthetic gas.

=== 64 GB Cable ===
The 64 GB Cable was an accessory designed by Marigul Management to connect the 64DD to a Game Boy Color, allowing data to be transferred between the two as well as using the GBC as a second screen, similar to the GameCube Game Boy Advance Cable. While demonstrated at Space World 1999, the accessory was never released, presumably due to the failure of the 64DD. Another unreleased accessory from Marigul, the GB Socket, was designed to interface with the 64 GB Cable and allow Game Boy Color games to similarly connect to games on the Sega Dreamcast.

=== Page Boy ===
The Page Boy was a device that plugged into the Game Boy Color's cartridge port, with a port of its own on the back, capable of connecting the Game Boy Color to the internet via radio signals. Using a proprietary piece of Game Boy software, the Page Boy would allow users to perform searches, send messages to other users, and view news, weather, and previews for upcoming games. Following the cancellation of the WorkBoy, the device's primary engineer Eddie Gill pitched the Page Boy to Nintendo of America in 1999. Nintendo expressed interest and spent three years in research and development on the device. However, it was determined that it would not be cost-effective for users outside the United States to connect to the requisite wireless networks, limiting the accessory's potential scope, and development was cancelled in 2002. The Page Boy's existence was not publicly known about until 2022, when game historian Liam Robertson profiled it after learning of its existence from Gill while researching the WorkBoy.

== Unlicensed accessories ==
=== GBA Steering Wheel ===
A steering wheel for the GBA which uses the shoulder buttons to move.

=== EZ Flash ===
The EZ Flash is a cartridge that provides a MicroSD slot such that a card loaded with GBA game ROM files can be inserted, allowing playback of multiple games, including cheat games or games that only use ROMs, not physical cartridges. The built-in firmware also allows other functions such as save states, cheat features, ROM and engine patching, as well as playback of GB, GBC, and NES games.

=== Game Changer ===
The Game Changer was an accessory manufactured by Radica Games for the GBA SP. It is designed to connect to the SP's cartridge slot, and has three cartridge slots of its own around the sides, allowing users to insert three games and manually switch between them.

=== Game Genie ===
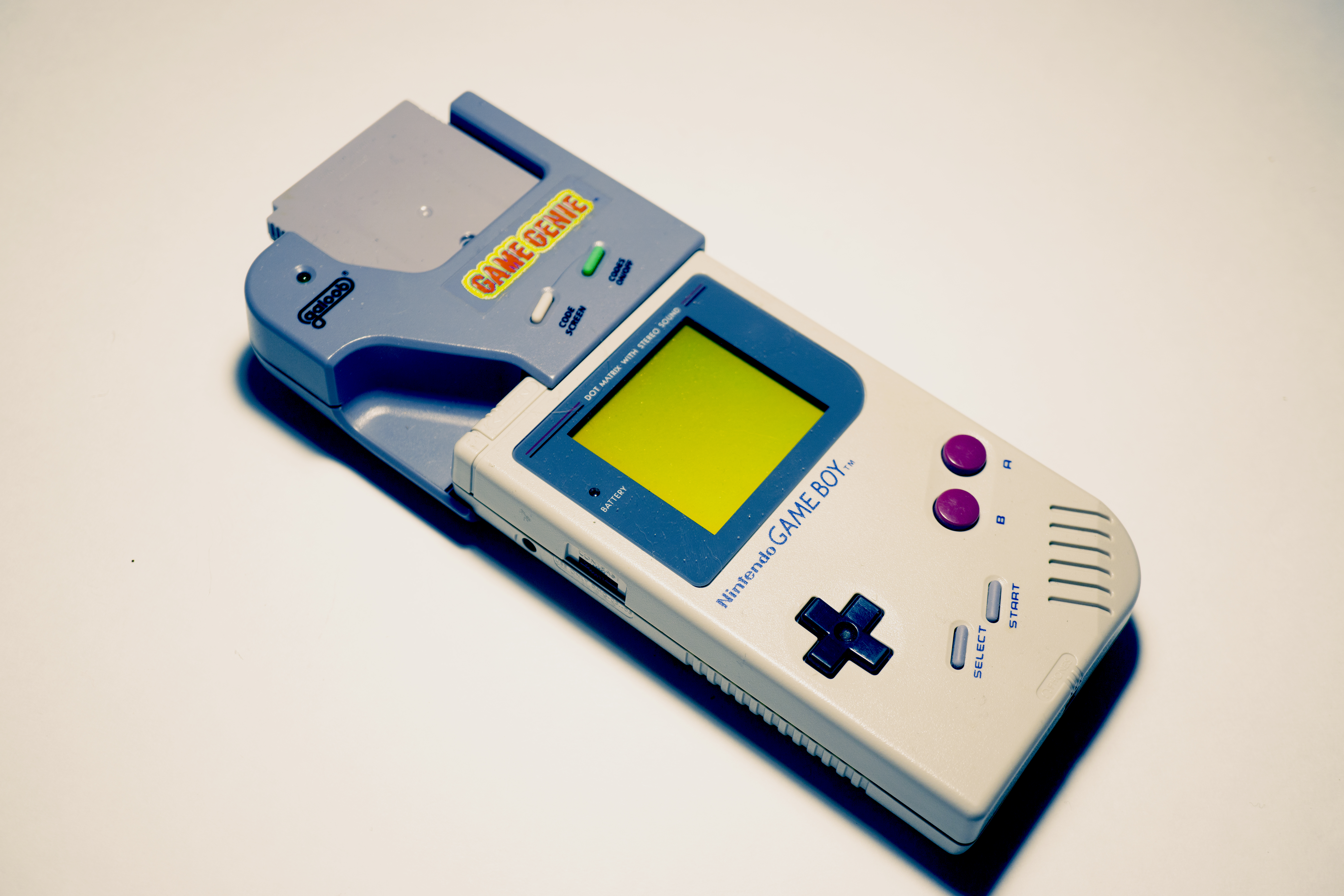
Game Genie attached to a Game Boy

The Game Genie was the first cheat cartridge for the Game Boy manufactured by Codemasters and distributed by Galoob. It is designed to nest snugly into the original Game Boy (though it will loosely fit into the Pocket and Color systems; it will fit into the Super Game Boy only after physical modification of the Game Genie.) The cartridge is inserted with the label facing inward. A compartment on the back holds the tiny code book containing codes for the system. Up to three lines of codes can be entered at a time. There is no backup, so codes have to be reentered upon each startup. Nintendo fought this accessory in Lewis Galoob Toys, Inc. v. Nintendo of America, Inc., but the court ruled that the Game Genie did not create a derivative work.

=== GameShark ===
The GameShark is a series of cheat devices manufactured by Interact Accessories and is one of the most popular cheat devices for the Game Boy family. Many more codes can be used at once. This device features a list of games with their codes and featured backup. This means that once a code is entered, it could be stored in the devices memory so that upon startup, the user can just select the code instead of having to reenter it. A switch on top of the unit allows the player to turn the device off and on if a code causes interference during certain situations.

Model 1 – Gray: For cheat codes only

Model 2 – Black: Same as above, though the storage interface has some problems. Also has an option of cleaning the RAM of a game (i.e. erasing all of a game's data)

Model 3 – Clear: This model supports both Game Boy and Game Boy Color games. Codes can be uploaded to the Model 3 version from the website using a cable which connected to the parallel port of a computer to the Game Boy's link cable port. Another feature is the "Snapshot" feature which takes a data snapshot of a game. Players can then load the snapshot later on and continue where they left off. Only one snapshot can be stored at a time.

A later model was made exclusively for Game Boy Advance games, with no backwards compatibility. Originally made by Interact Accessories, the rights were later obtained by Mad Catz. Codes can be uploaded to it from the companion website via a USB cable to the unit itself.

=== CodeBreaker ===
Also known as the Monster Brain and Brain Boy, this cheat device was released by Pelican Accessories and can use GameShark codes, but is more user friendly.

=== Action Replay ===
When Datel started producing cheat devices for consoles, they made this for the Nintendo DS. It essentially has all the basic properties of the Game Shark for Game Boy Advance.

=== Action Replay MAX Duo ===
This is an upgraded version of the original Action Replay. It can be used as a cheat device for Game Boy Advance games. It also can be used to back up saved game data from Nintendo DS cards, or can put premade save files – or "powersaves" into the DS cards. Powersaves and codes can be downloaded from the Action Replay web site and uploaded to the device via a USB cable.
