= The Legend of Zelda: Link's Awakening =

1993 video game

- North American box art
- Developer: Nintendo EAD
- Publisher: Nintendo
- Director: Takashi Tezuka
- Producer: Shigeru Miyamoto
- Designer: Yasuhisa Yamamura
- Programmers: Takamitsu Kuzuhara; Kazuaki Morita
- Artists: Yoichi Kotabe; Masanao Arimoto; Shigefumi Hino
- Writers: Yoshiaki Koizumi; Kensuke Tanabe
- Composers: Kazumi Totaka; Minako Hamano; Kozue Ishikawa
- Series: The Legend of Zelda
- Platform: Game Boy
- Release: JP: June 6, 1993; NA: August 6, 1993; EU: December 1, 1993
- Genre: Action-adventure
- Mode: Single-player

The Legend of Zelda: Link's Awakening (Note: Known in Japan as Zelda no Densetsu: Yume o Miru Shima (Japanese: ゼルダの伝説 夢をみる島, Hepburn: Zeruda no Densetsu: Yume o Miru Shima; lit. "The Legend of Zelda: The Dreaming Island")) is a 1993 action-adventure game developed and published by Nintendo for the Game Boy. It is the first installment in The Legend of Zelda series to be released on a handheld game console. Link's Awakening is one of the few Zelda games not to take place in the land of Hyrule, and it does not feature Princess Zelda or the Triforce relic. Instead, the protagonist Link begins the game stranded on Koholint Island, a place guarded by a whale-like deity called the Wind Fish. Assuming the role of Link, the player fights monsters and solves puzzles while searching for eight musical instruments that will awaken the sleeping Wind Fish and allow him to escape from the island.

Development began as an effort to port the Super Nintendo Entertainment System game A Link to the Past to the Game Boy, developed after-hours by Nintendo staff. It grew into an original project under the direction of Takashi Tezuka, with a story and script created by Yoshiaki Koizumi and Kensuke Tanabe. The majority of the Link to the Past team reassembled for Link's Awakening, and Tezuka wanted the game world to feel like the television series Twin Peaks. After a development period of one and a half years, Link's Awakening was released in Japan in June 1993 and worldwide later in the year.

Link's Awakening was critically and commercially successful. Critics praised the game's depth and number of features; complaints focused on its control scheme and monochrome graphics. An updated rerelease, The Legend of Zelda: Link's Awakening DX, was released for the Game Boy Color in 1998 featuring color graphics, compatibility with the Game Boy Printer, and an exclusive color-based dungeon. The game has sold four million units worldwide, and has appeared on multiple game publications' lists of the best video games of all time. A high-definition remake developed by Grezzo for the Nintendo Switch was released in 2019.

== Gameplay ==
The protagonist, Link, battles an enemy. The bottom of the screen displays equipped items, rupees, and the character's hearts or health. The right half of the image depicts the graphics of the original game, while the left shows the color graphics of the DX edition.

Like most games in The Legend of Zelda series, Link's Awakening is an action-adventure game focused on exploration and combat. The majority of the game takes place from an overhead perspective. The player traverses the overworld of Koholint Island while fighting monsters and exploring underground dungeons. Dungeons steadily become larger and more difficult, and feature "Nightmare" boss characters that the player must defeat, taking different forms in each dungeon, and getting harder to defeat each time. Success earns the player heart containers, which increase the amount of damage the player character can survive; when all of the player's heart containers have been emptied, the game restarts at the last doorway entered by the character. Defeating a Nightmare also earns the player one of the eight instruments necessary to complete the game.

Link's Awakening uses the same inventory/control system as in Ultima: Runes of Virtue (released two years earlier). The player can assign any item in the inventory to either the button "A" or "B".

Link's Awakening was the first overhead-perspective Zelda game to allow Link to jump; this enables sidescrolling sequences similar to those in the earlier Zelda II: The Adventure of Link. Players can expand their abilities with items, which are discovered in dungeons and through character interactions. Certain items grant access to previously inaccessible areas and are needed to enter and complete dungeons. The player may steal items from the game's shop, but doing so changes the player character's name to "THIEF" for the rest of the game and causes the shopkeeper to knock out the character upon re-entry of the shop.

In addition to the main quest, Link's Awakening contains side-missions and diversions. Collectible "secret seashells" are hidden throughout the game; when 20 of these are found, the player can receive a powerful sword that fires energy beams when the player character is at full health, similar to the sword in the original The Legend of Zelda. Link's Awakening is the first Zelda game to include a trading sequence minigame: the player may give a certain item to a character, who in turn gives the player another item to trade with someone else. It is also the first game in the Zelda series in which the A and B buttons may be assigned to different items, which enables more varied puzzles and item combinations. Other series elements originating in Link's Awakening include fishing, and learning special songs on an ocarina; the latter mechanic is central to the next Zelda game released, Ocarina of Time.

== Synopsis ==
=== Setting and characters ===
Unlike most The Legend of Zelda titles, Link's Awakening is set outside the kingdom of Hyrule. It omits locations and characters from previous games, aside from protagonist Link and a passing mention of Princess Zelda. Instead, the game takes place entirely on Koholint Island, an isolated landmass cut off from the rest of the world. The island, though small, contains a large number of secrets and interconnected pathways. Within the Zelda timeline, Link's Awakening takes place after A Link to the Past and before Oracle of Seasons and Ages.

In Link's Awakening, the player is given advice and directions by non-player characters such as Ulrira, a shy old man who communicates with Link exclusively by telephone. The game contains cameo appearances by characters from other Nintendo titles, such as Wart, Yoshi, Kirby, Dr. Wright (renamed Mr. Write) from the Super NES version of SimCity, and the exiled prince Richard from The Frog for Whom the Bell Tolls. Chomp, an enemy from the Mario series, was included after a programmer gave Link the ability to grab the creature and take it for a walk. Enemies from Super Mario Bros. such as Goombas and Piranha Plants also appear in underground side-scrolling sections; Link may land on top of them much as with Super Mario Bros., or he can attack them in the usual way: the two methods yield different bonuses. Director Takashi Tezuka said that the game's "freewheeling" development made Link's Awakening seem like a parody of The Legend of Zelda series. Certain characters in the game break the fourth wall; for example, little children inform the player of game mechanics such as saving, but admit that they do not understand the advice they are giving.

=== Plot ===
After the events of A Link to the Past, the hero Link travels by ship to other countries to train for further threats. A storm destroys his boat at sea, and he washes ashore on Koholint Island, where he is taken to the house of Tarin by his daughter Marin. She is fascinated by Link and the outside world, and tells Link wishfully that, if she were a seagull, she would leave and travel across the sea. After Link recovers his sword, a mysterious owl tells him that he must wake the Wind Fish, Koholint's guardian, in order to return home. The Wind Fish lies dreaming in a giant egg on top of Mt. Tamaranch, and can only be awakened by the eight Instruments of the Sirens.

Link proceeds to explore a series of dungeons in order to recover the eight instruments. During his search for the sixth instrument, Link goes to the Ancient Ruins. There he finds a mural that details the reality of the island: that it is merely a dream world created by the Wind Fish. After this revelation, the owl tells Link that this is only a rumor, and only the Wind Fish knows for certain whether it is true. Throughout Koholint Island, nightmare creatures attempt to obstruct Link's quest for the instruments, as they wish to rule the Wind Fish's dreamworld.

After collecting all eight instruments from the eight dungeons across Koholint, Link climbs to the top of Mt. Tamaranch and plays the Ballad of the Wind Fish. This breaks open the egg in which the Wind Fish sleeps; Link enters and confronts the last evil being, a Nightmare that takes the form of Ganon and other enemies from Link's past. Its final transformation is "DethI", a cyclopean, dual-tentacled Shadow. After Link defeats DethI, the owl reveals itself to be the Wind Fish's spirit, and the Wind Fish confirms that Koholint is all his dream. When Link plays the Ballad of the Wind Fish again, he and the Wind Fish awaken; Koholint Island and all its inhabitants slowly disappear. Link finds himself lying on his ship's driftwood in the middle of the ocean, with the Wind Fish flying overhead. If the player did not lose any lives during the game, Marin is shown flying after the ending credits finish. (Note: In the DX and Switch versions, Marin is instead implied to have become a seagull flying across the ocean.)

== Development ==
Link's Awakening began as an unsanctioned side project; programmer Kazuaki Morita created a Zelda-like game with one of the first Game Boy development kits, and he used it to experiment with the platform's capabilities. Other staff members of the Nintendo Entertainment Analysis & Development division joined him after-hours and worked on the game in what seemed to them like an "afterschool club". The results of these experiments with the Game Boy started to look promising. Following the 1991 release of the Super NES video game A Link to the Past, director Takashi Tezuka asked for permission to develop a handheld Zelda title; he intended it to be a port of A Link to the Past, but it evolved into an original game. The majority of the team that had created A Link to the Past was reassembled to advance this new project. Altogether, it took them one and a half years to develop Link's Awakening.

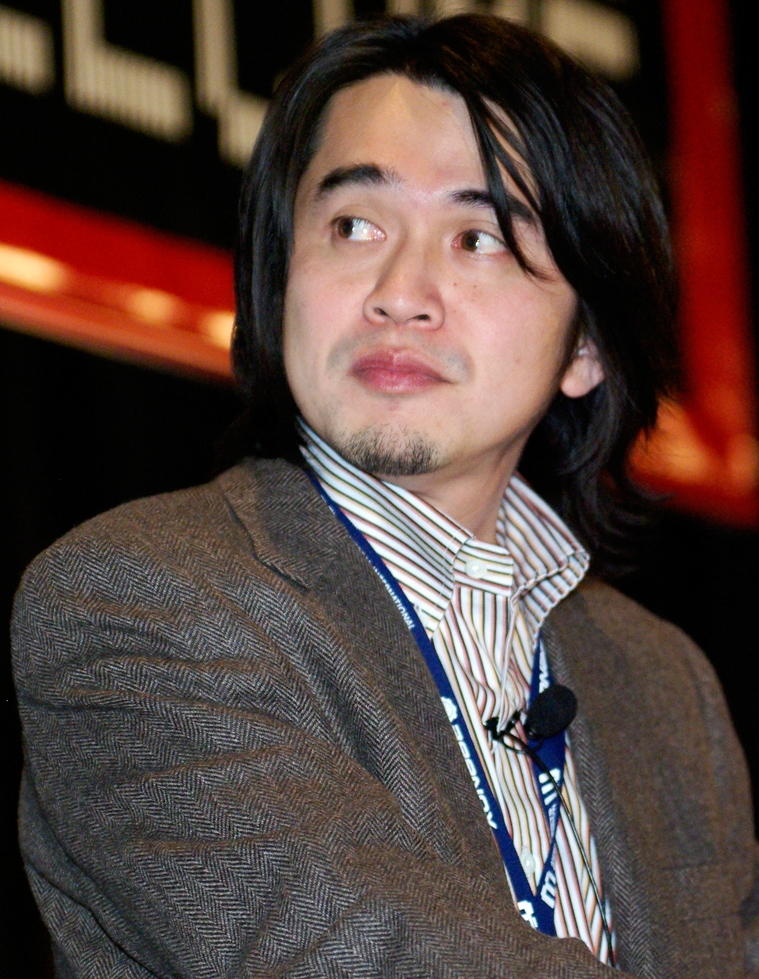
Designer Yoshiaki Koizumi was in charge of the game's story and conceived major plot points, such as the dream world island setting.

Tezuka recalled that the early free-form development of Link's Awakening resulted in the game's "unrestrained" contents, such as the unauthorized cameo appearances of characters from the Mario and Kirby series. A Link to the Past script writer Kensuke Tanabe joined the team early on and came up with the basis of the story. Tezuka sought to make Link's Awakening a spin-off, and he gave Tanabe instructions to omit common series elements such as Princess Zelda, the Triforce relic, and the setting Hyrule. As a consequence, Tanabe proposed his game world idea of an island with an egg on top of a mountain. Tezuka recalled that it felt as though they were making a "parody of The Legend of Zelda" rather than an actual Zelda game.

Later on, Yoshiaki Koizumi, who had previously helped with the plot of A Link to the Past, was brought into the team. Koizumi was responsible for the main story of Link's Awakening, provided the idea of the island in a dream, and conceived the interactions with the villagers. Link's Awakening was described by series producer Eiji Aonuma as the first Zelda game with a proper plot, which he attributed to Koizumi's romanticism. Tezuka intended the game's world to have a similar feeling to the American television series Twin Peaks, which, like Link's Awakening, features characters in a small town. He suggested that the characters of Link's Awakening be written as "suspicious types", akin to those in Twin Peaks—a theme which carried over into later Zelda titles. Tanabe created these "odd" characters; he was placed in charge of the subevents of the story and wrote almost all of the character dialog, with the exception of the owl's and the Wind Fish's lines. Twin Peaks co-creator Mark Frost had previously met with a Nintendo engineer in 1990 for a conversation regarding a Twin Peaks video game, and they discussed the inspiration of Twin Peaks in regards to the expansion of the Zelda universe. Tanabe implemented a previous idea of the world ending when a massive egg breaks on top of a mountain; this idea was originally meant for A Link to the Past. Tanabe really wanted to see this idea in a game and was able to implement it in Link's Awakening as the basic concept.

Masanao Arimoto and Shigefumi Hino designed the game's characters, while Yoichi Kotabe served as illustrator. Save for the opening and the ending, all pictures in the game were drawn by Arimoto. Yasahisa Yamamura designed the dungeons, which included the conception of rooms and routes, as well as the placement of enemies. Shigeru Miyamoto, who served as the producer of Link's Awakening, did not provide creative input to the staff members. However, he participated as game tester, and his opinions greatly influenced the latter half of the development.

The music for Link's Awakening was composed by Minako Hamano, Kozue Ishikawa, for whom it was their first game project, and Kazumi Totaka, who also was responsible for the sound programming and all sound effects. As with most Zelda games, Link's Awakening includes a variation of the recurring overworld music; The staff credits theme, "Yume o Miru Shima e" was later arranged for orchestra by Yuka Tsujiyoko and performed at the Orchestral Game Music Concert 3 in 1993. Super Smash Bros. Brawl includes a remix of the game's "Tal Tal Heights" theme, which has since returned in subsequent Super Smash Bros. titles.

In an interview about the evolution of the Zelda series, Aonuma called Link's Awakening the "quintessential isometric Zelda game". At another time, he stated that, had the game not come after A Link to the Past, Ocarina of Time would have been very different. Tezuka said that he prefers the game over A Link to the Past, as he enjoyed the challenge of making a similar game on lower-specced hardware. Several elements from Link's Awakening were re-used in later Zelda titles; for example, programmer Morita created a fishing minigame that reappeared in Ocarina of Time, among others. Tanabe implemented a trading sequence; Tezuka compared it to the Japanese Straw Millionaire folktale, in which someone trades up from a piece of straw to something of greater value. This concept also appeared in most sequels.

== Release ==
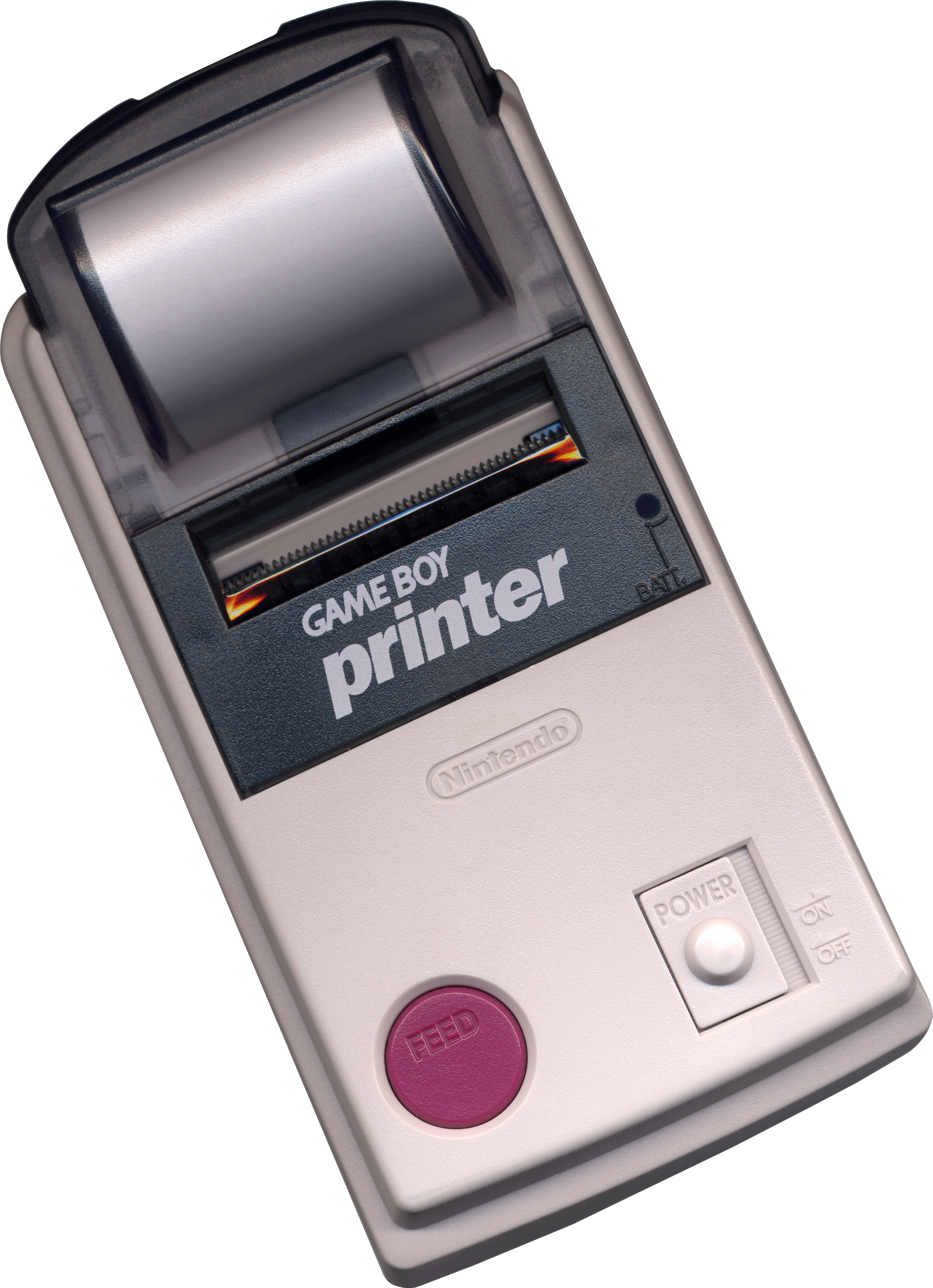
The Game Boy Printer accessory was compatible with the DX release of Link's Awakening.

To support the North American release of Link's Awakening, Nintendo sponsored a crosscountry train competition called the Zelda Whistle Stop Tour. The event, which lasted three days, allowed select players to test Link's Awakening in a timed race to complete the game. The event was meant not only to showcase the game, but also the Game Boy's superior battery life and portability, the latter of which was critical to the accessibility of a portable Zelda title. The company-owned magazine Nintendo Power published a guide to the game's first three areas in its July 1993 issue.

In 1998, to promote the launch of the Game Boy Color, Nintendo re-released Link's Awakening as The Legend of Zelda: Link's Awakening DX. It features fully colorized graphics and is backward compatible with the original Game Boy. Link's Awakening DX contains a new optional dungeon, with unique enemies and puzzles based on color (due to this, the dungeon cannot be accessed on the earlier non-color Game Boy models). After completing the dungeon, the player may choose to receive either a red or blue tunic, which increase attack and defense, respectively. The DX version also allows players to take photos after the player visits a camera shop; its owner will appear in certain locations throughout the game. A total of twelve photos can be taken, which may be viewed at the shop, or printed with the Game Boy Printer accessory. For Link's Awakening DX, Tezuka returned as project supervisor, with Yoshinori Tsuchiyama as the new director. Nobuo Matsumiya collaborated with Tsuchiyama on applying changes to the original script; for example, hint messages were added to the boss battles. For the new dungeon, Yuichi Ozaki created a musical piece based on Kondo's dungeon theme from the original The Legend of Zelda.

=== Remakes ===
Nintendo later re-released the DX version on the Virtual Console of the Nintendo 3DS in June 2011. In July 2013, Link's Awakening DX was offered as one of several Virtual Console games which "elite status" members of the North America Club Nintendo could redeem as a free gift. A high-definition remake was developed by Grezzo and released for the Nintendo Switch on September 20, 2019.

Link's Awakening was included in a Zelda-themed Game & Watch console alongside The Legend of Zelda and Zelda II: The Adventure of Link. It was released on November 12, 2021.

== Reception ==
Reception

Aggregate score
Aggregator	Score
GameRankings	GB: 90% GBC: 91%

Review scores
Publication	Score
AllGame	GBC: 4.5/5
Electronic Gaming Monthly	GB: 8/10, 8/10, 9/10, 8/10
GameSpot	GBC: 8.7/10
IGN	GBC: 10/10
Nintendo Life	GB: 10/10; GBC: 10/10
Nintendo Power	GBC: 8.8/10
Total Game Boy	95%

Awards
Publication	Award
Golden Joystick Awards	Game of the Year (handheld), Best Advert of the Year
Electronic Gaming Monthly	Best Game Boy Game of 1993, Editor's Choice Award (DX)
Nintendo Power	Graphics and Sound, Challenge, Play Control, Best Overall, 56th Best Nintendo Game
IGN	Reader's 40th Best Game of all time Staff's 78th Best Game of all time

=== Sales ===
In Japan, the game topped the Famitsu sales chart in June 1993. In North America, it was the top-selling Game Boy game in August 1993. Link's Awakening sold well and helped boost Game Boy sales 13 percent in 1993—making it one of Nintendo's most profitable years in North America up to that time. The game remained on bestseller lists for more than 90 months after release, was re-released as part of the Player's Choice series, and went on to sell 3.83 million units by 2004. The DX version sold another 2.22 million units. The Virtual Console release of Link's Awakening DX was the top-selling downloadable Nintendo 3DS game of 2011, selling over 338,700 units, or an estimated $2.3 million in gross revenue.

=== Reviews ===
Link's Awakening was critically acclaimed, and holds an average score of 90% on aggregate site GameRankings. It was reviewed by four reviewers in Electronic Gaming Monthly, with two suggesting it was "probably the best" and "by far one of the most involving and fun games" for the Game Boy. One reviewer complimented the story and characters as well crafted, while the graphics were great for the Game Boy system.

In a retrospective article, Electronic Gaming Monthly writer Jeremy Parish called Link's Awakening the "best Game Boy game ever, an adventure so engrossing and epic that we can even forgive the whole thing for being one of those 'It's all a dream!' fakeouts". Game Informer's Ben Reeves called it the third best Game Boy game and called it influential. The Washington Post's Chip Carter declared that Nintendo had created a "legend that fits in the palm of your hand", and praised its portability and depth. An Jōkiri of ITMedia echoed similar comments. A writer for the Mainichi Shimbun enjoyed the game's music and story. Multiple sources touted it as an excellent portable adventure for those without the time for more sophisticated games.

Complaints about the game included its control scheme and monochrome graphics; certain critics believed that they made it difficult to discern the screen's contents, and wished that the game was in color. Critic William Burrill dismissed the game's visuals as "dim Boy graphics [that are] nothing to write home about". Both Carter and the Ottawa Citizen's Bill Provick found the two-button control scheme awkward, as they needed to switch items on almost every screen. The Vancouver Sun's Katherine Monk called the dialogue "stilted", but considered the rest of the game to be "ever-surprising".

Link's Awakening DX also received positive reviews with multiple critics highlighting the color graphics as an improvement; based on ten media outlets, it holds an average score of 91% on GameRankings. IGN's Adam Cleveland awarded the game a perfect score, and noted that "throughout the color-enhanced version of Zelda DX, it can easily be inferred that Nintendo has reworked its magic to fit new standards", by adding new content while keeping the original game intact. Cameron Davis of GameSpot applauded the game's camera support and attention to detail in coloration and style, while reviewers for the Courier Mail believed that the camera added gameplay depth and allowed players to show off trophies. The Daily Telegraph's Samantha Amjadali wrote that the addition of color made the game easier by reducing deaths caused by indistinct graphics. Total Games noted that the new content added little to the game, but found it addictive to play nonetheless.

=== Accolades ===
The game won several awards. At the Golden Joystick Awards, it won two awards, for Game of the Year (handheld) and Best Advert of the Year. It also won the Game Boy categories for Graphics and Sound, Challenge, Theme and Fun, Play Control and Best Overall in the reader-chosen 1993 Nintendo Power Awards. It was awarded Best Game Boy Game of 1993 by Electronic Gaming Monthly. In 1997, Electronic Gaming Monthly ranked the Game Boy version the 28th best console video game of all time, saying it ended up "beating out the Super NES Zelda in both size and scope". They also lauded its humorous dialogue, hefty challenge, and incorporation of the best gameplay mechanics of its predecessors. Nintendo Power later named it the fifty-sixth best Nintendo game, and, in August 2008, listed the DX version as the second best Game Boy or Game Boy Color game. IGN's readers ranked it as the 40th best game of all time, while the staff placed it at 78th; the staff believed that, "while handheld spin-offs are generally considered the low point for game franchises, Link's Awakening proves that they can offer just as rich a gameplay experience as their console counterparts". In 2009, Official Nintendo Magazine ranked the DX version of the game 25th in a list of the greatest Nintendo games, calling it "an absolute masterclass in handheld game design".
