= Quest for Camelot (1998 video game) =

1998 video game

- North American cover art
- Developer: Titus Interactive
- Publisher: Nintendo
- Platform: Game Boy Color
- Release: NA: December 21, 1998
- Genre: Action role-playing
- Mode: Single-player

Quest for Camelot is a 1998 action role-playing game developed by Titus Interactive and published by Nintendo for the Game Boy Color. It is based on the film of the same title under license from Warner Bros. The game is compatible with Game Boy, Super Game Boy, and Game Boy Printer. A Nintendo 64 version was planned but was canceled due to the film's poor performance at the box office.

The game was added to the Nintendo Classics service on September 6, 2023.

== Gameplay ==
Quest for Camelot is a third-person, 2D action role-playing game. It features nine worlds with 60 levels. The gameplay includes defeating enemies in each area, fetch quests, and carry quests. Parts of the story are told through slideshows as cut scenes. The game supports saves on battery and works with the Game Boy Printer.

== Plot ==
Ten years after killing Sir Lionel, the evil knight Ruber abducts his widow Juliana and steals King Arthur's sword Excalibur. Lionel's daughter Kayley sets out on a quest to stop Ruber and retrieve her mother and Excalibur, making new friends and battling enemies along the way.

== History ==
In early 1997, Titus signed a licensing deal with Warner Bros. to make games based on Quest for Camelot for the Nintendo 64, PlayStation, Sega Saturn, and Game Boy. Quest for Camelot was developed and co-published by Titus Interactive and Nintendo. It was released on December 21, 1998. The game was added to the Nintendo Classics service on September 6, 2023.

== Reception ==
Reception

Aggregate score
Aggregator	Score
GameRankings	49.67%

Review scores
Publication	Score
AllGame	2.5/5
IGN	4/10
Nintendo Power	7.4/10

The game was met with some negative reception, as GameRankings gave it a score of 50%. Adam Cleveland of IGN summarized the game as "bad", and its core mechanics as "boring" due to walking between points and looking for objects. He criticized the repetitive music, and said the only decent part of the game was its use of color. He noted Titus's reputation for games of poor quality, especially games with licensed content. Allgame's Joe Ottoson criticized how gem collectibles were needed to save the game progress. He added that the gameplay was tedious and the menus poorly designed.
