= Game Boy Camera =

Accessory for the Nintendo Game Boy

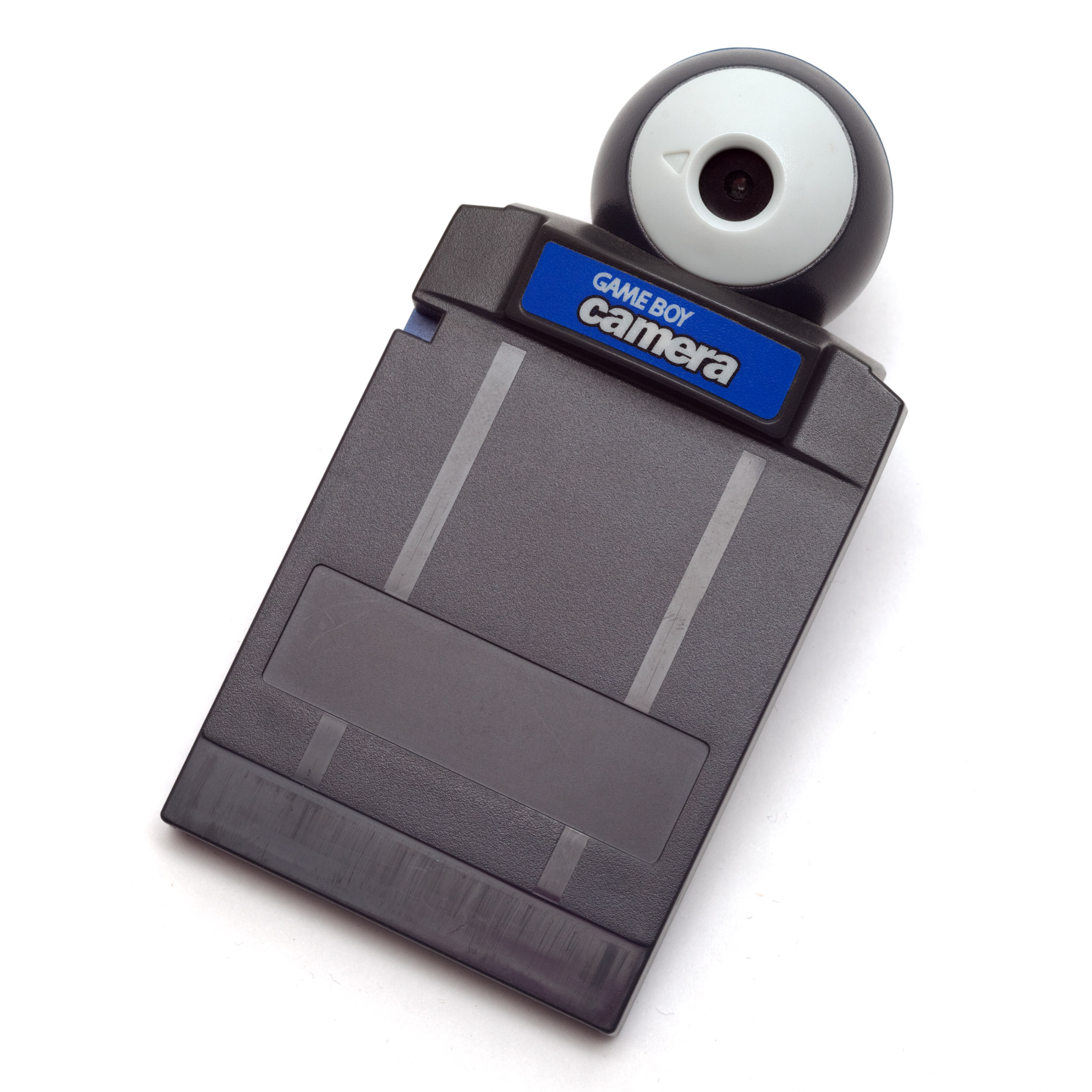
- A blue Game Boy Camera. Various other colors were also available.
- Manufacturer: Nintendo
- Product family: Game Boy line
- Type: Video game accessory
- Generation: Fourth generation
- Released: JP: February 21, 1998; NA: June 1, 1998; PAL: June 4, 1998
- Introductory price: ¥5,500; US$49.95

The Game Boy Camera, released as Pocket Camera (Note: Japanese: ポケットカメラ) in Japan, is a digital camera accessory for Nintendo's Game Boy game console. It was released on February 21, 1998, in Japan, and manufacturing ceased in late 2002. A device designed for user-generated content, it can be used to take grayscale photographs, edit them or create original drawings, and transfer images between Game Boy Camera units or to the 64DD art game suite Mario Artist. The accessory featured a 180°-swivel front-facing camera that allowed users to capture selfies. Its images can be printed to thermal paper with the Game Boy Printer. The Game Boy Camera's cartridge contains minigames based on Nintendo's early games such as the arcade video game Space Fever and the Game & Watch handheld game Ball, and a chiptune music sequencer; photographers have embraced its technological limitations as artistic challenges.

== Overview ==
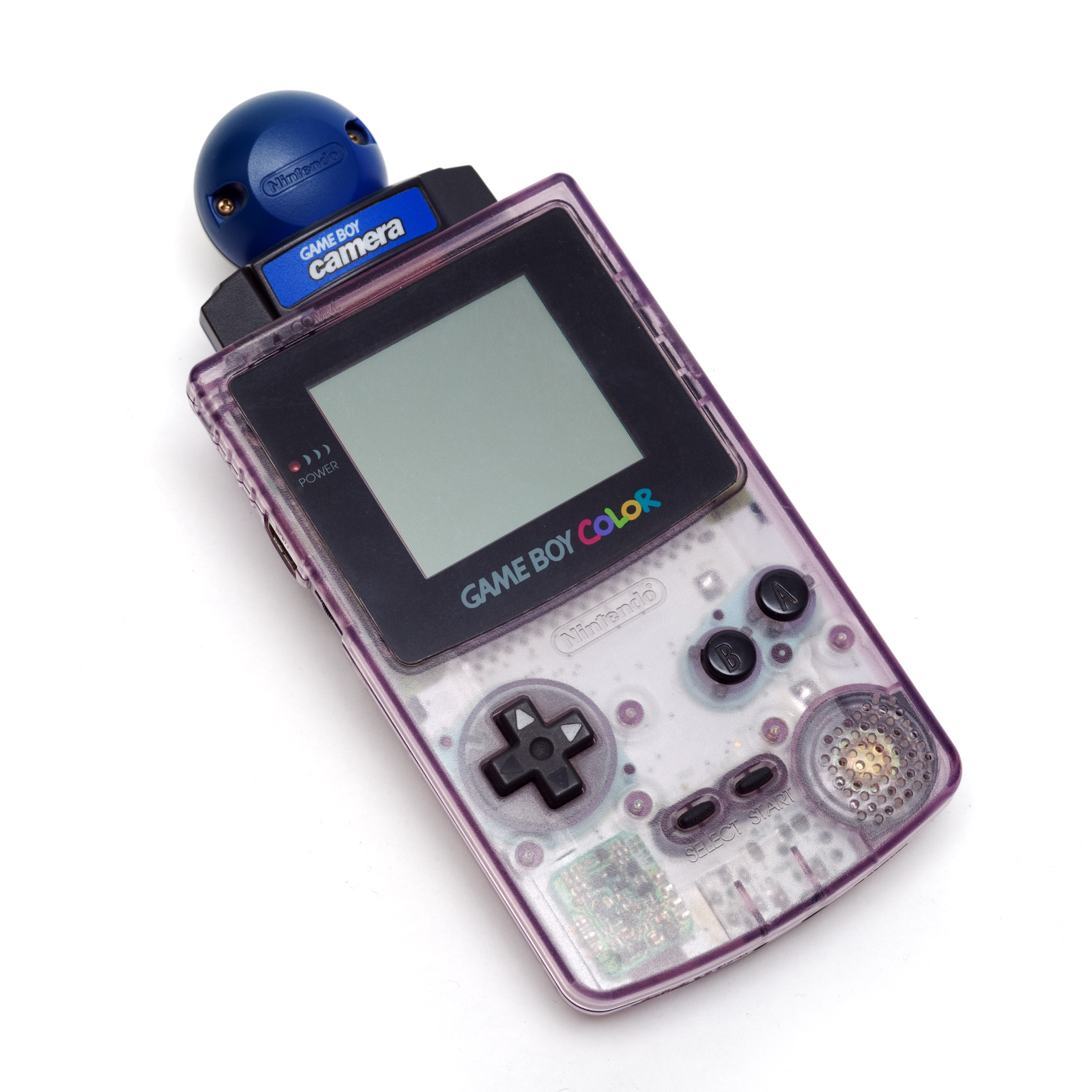
Installed in a Game Boy Color, with the camera rotated

The Game Boy Camera interfaces with the Game Boy Printer, which utilizes thermal paper to print saved images. Both the camera and the printer were marketed by Nintendo as light-hearted entertainment devices aimed mainly at children in all three major video game regions of the world: Japan, North America, and Europe. N64 Magazine (which has since been superseded by NGamer) dedicated a monthly section to the device.

The Game Boy Camera is compatible with the entire Game Boy line except Game Boy Micro. Video output to a TV is possible via the Super Game Boy for the Super NES, the Game Boy Player for the GameCube, or the Analogue Pocket when mounted on its HDMI dock.

The Game Boy Camera line has five different standard colors of models: blue, green, red, yellow, and clear purple (Japan only). There is a limited edition gold themed for The Legend of Zelda: Ocarina of Time, which contains unique stamps, and was available only in the United States through a mail-order offer from Nintendo Power.

In September 2020, information was leaked of an unreleased Hello Kitty version of the camera.

Nintendo reportedly had plans to release a successor to the Game Boy Camera for the Game Boy Advance called the GameEye which would take color photos and feature connectivity with the GameCube through a game titled Stage Debut, but neither the GameEye nor Stage Debut were released.

== Functionality ==
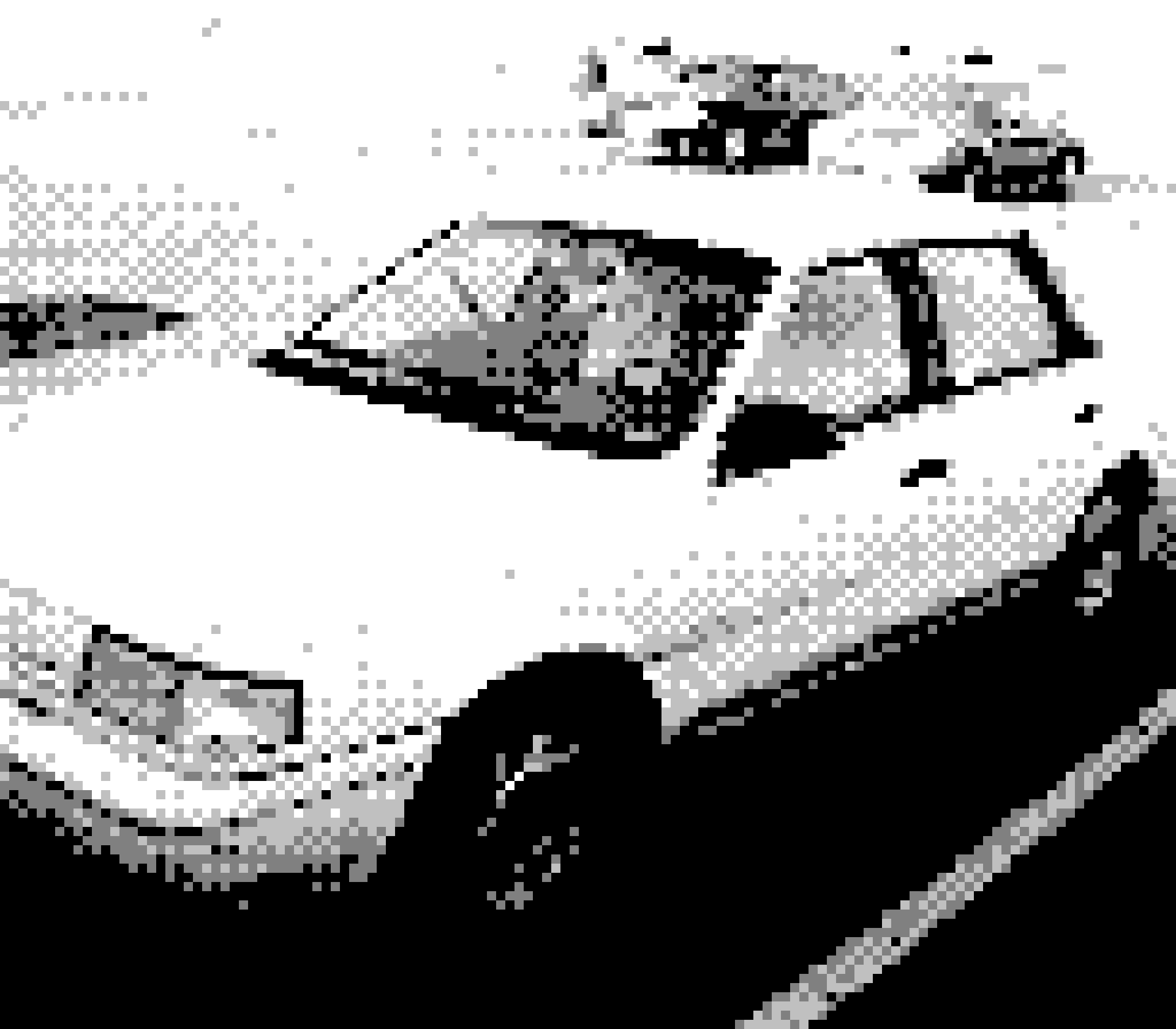
A photo of a Ford Tempo taken with the Game Boy Camera

The camera is controlled, images are manipulated, and minigames are played by Game Boy software running from the cartridge the camera is attached to.

Images can be transferred via the Game Link Cable, to be printed on the Game Boy Printer, copied between Game Boy Camera units, or copied via the Nintendo 64 controller's Transfer Pak to a 64DD floppy disk. The Japanese Game Boy Camera is optionally integrated into the Mario Artist suite of multimedia games for the 64DD peripheral. There, users can create drawn and 3D-animated avatars of themselves based on photographs taken with the camera, integrate these personalized avatars into various 64DD games including Mario Artist and SimCity 64, or post art on the Internet through Randnet.

The software in the Game Boy Camera has numerous references to other Nintendo products. There are a few differences between the North American and Japanese versions, including the unlockable B album pictures and the stamps that can be placed on pictures. The software has a few Easter eggs, some of which have been described as "creepy", like, for example, scribbled pictures of the developers in it.

== Camera and photos ==
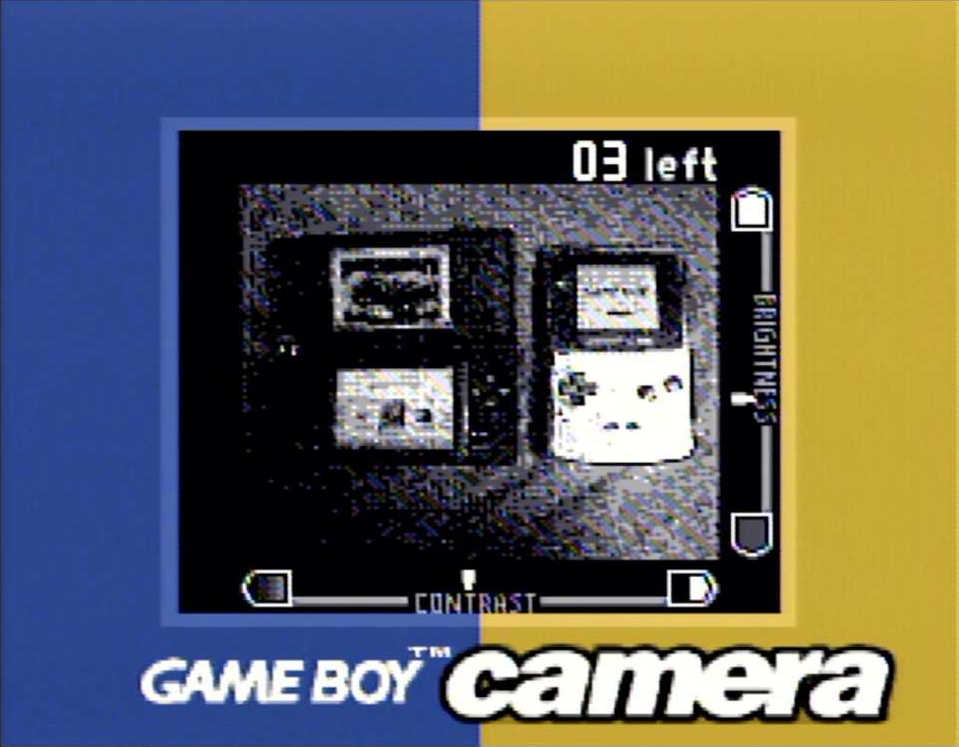
A photo of a Nintendo DSi and Game Boy Color through the viewfinder of the Game Boy Camera on a Super Game Boy

The Game Boy Camera has a 128×128 pixel CMOS sensor, and can store 128×112, dithered grayscale digital images using the 4-color palette of the Game Boy system. Up to 30 photos can be stored in the memory of the cartridge at once. If the photo limit is reached, a photo must be deleted to take another.

Only the brightness and contrast can be adjusted while taking photos, changing the white point and the amount of dithering respectively. Shutter speed is automatic, and depends on lighting conditions. The camera is fixed-focus, and has a working distance of 20cm without any optical or digital zoom available.

The CMOS sensor includes a feature called "edge enhancement", which the Game Boy Camera uses to define the edges of an object with a faint black outline.

Photos can be taken with other features including a delay timer, time lapse, trick lenses like mirroring and scaling, montage, and panorama for stitching together component photos into one large image. Photos can be further edited by placing Nintendo's stamps, or freehand doodling. Photos can be combined as frames of an animation. Photos can be interconnected with clickable hyperlinks in "hot spots" mode.

Since photos do not fill the entirety of the Game Boy's screen, each photo is displayed with a border around the photo when viewing them from the Game Boy Camera album. There are 18 different border designs to choose from, including the default border. Borders are included when printing out a photo with the Game Boy Printer.

== Minigames ==
- Space Fever II is a sequel to the early Nintendo arcade game Space Fever. In this minigame, the player controls a spaceship which fires missiles at other ships throughout three unique levels, followed by a boss at the end of each level. The first boss is a giant face of a man with horns, the second boss is a giant face of a mustachioed man, and the third boss is the Game Face. Once all three of the bosses are beaten, the cycle will restart with increased difficulty. At the beginning of the game, two spaceships appear; shooting the "B" ship will enter the Ball minigame, and shooting the "D" ship will enter DJ. By avoiding both of the ships, the player will begin playing Space Fever II. After scoring 2,000 points there, a new minigame called Run! Run! Run! will be unlocked, where a new ship marked with a "?" will appear at the beginning.
- Ball is a juggling game, in which the player moves the hand around to catch and throw balls. It is a variation of the Game & Watch game Ball, only with Mr. Game & Watch's head replaced with the Game Face. The background music to this game is "Mayim Mayim", an Israeli folk song.
- DJ is an open-ended music video game with a music sequencer known as Trippy-H where players can mix and create simple chiptunes. The Game Face is the DJ.
- Run! Run! Run! is the bonus minigame. The Game Face is attached to a cartoon body, and the player races against a mole and a bird for the finish line. By clearing this minigame in under 22 seconds, the credits are unlocked.

== Development ==
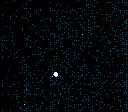
Jupiter and its moons taken with a Game Boy Camera through a 10" telescope

Initially, the Game Boy Camera was not well received within Nintendo. However, Masato Kuwahara approached Creatures, Inc. President Hirokazu Tanaka regarding the development of the software for the device, which solidified the project. The camera's built-in software was co-developed by Nintendo Research & Development 1 and the Japanese company Jupiter, with Tanaka directing the project. The Game Boy Camera was launched with an initial MSRP of US$49.95.

In addition to Mario Artist, some Nintendo 64 games had planned Game Boy Camera support that was removed during development. During development of Pokémon Snap (1999), Satoru Iwata experimented with letting players transfer their photos to Game Boy Camera for printing, but decided the resulting image quality was insufficient and removed the feature. Perfect Dark was intended to feature a mode called "Perfect Head", which would allow photos to be transferred from the camera for use on characters' faces in the multiplayer mode. However, this mode was removed prior to release, as a result of both technical issues and a wave of anti-violent video game sentiment after the Columbine High School massacre.

== Legacy ==
The Camera sold close to 500,000 units in its first three weeks of availability in Japan.

As one of the earliest consumer digital cameras, the Game Boy Camera has been legitimized for user-generated content, especially photography. Modern computer connectivity has required experimentation for image retrieval.

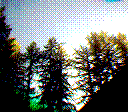
An example of a color photo taken with a Game Boy Camera using red, green and blue filters

The cover art of Neil Young's 2000 album Silver & Gold was taken using a Game Boy Camera.

Third-party vendors have reverse engineered the Game Boy Camera to create modern transfer methods for photos such as USB, SD cards and Wi-Fi.

In 2000, a professional photographer created a color workflow similar to the world's earliest color photography, to process the Game Boy Camera's grayscale photos through red, green, and blue filters to produce a color photograph. An artist using a Game Boy Camera and three colour process has developed a series of works since 2012, focusing on the interplay between what the abstracted images reveal and conceal about the photographed environment, as well as using the Game Boy Printer within his practice. A PhD student performed astrophotography of scenes including Jupiter, through academic telescopes using the Game Boy Camera. In 2017, a research engineer developed a neural network application to automatically convert Game Boy Camera monochrome images into color images. Several modern smartphone apps have modes to simulate Game Boy Camera image quality. In 2016, an Instagram artist included the vintage Game Boy Camera hardware in his repertoire of high-technology stylized filters, creating a new gallery dedicated only to Game Boy Camera photography, because its primitive camera "forces you to find a way to take beautiful pictures".

In 2021, a YouTuber created a 3D-printable lens adapter for attaching a DSLR lens to the Game Boy Camera.

== See also ==
- Game Boy Pocket Sonar
- Mario Paint (1992), a Super NES art game
- Mario no Photopi (1998), a Nintendo 64 art game for editing and printing photos from digital cameras
- Miiverse, Nintendo's former global online art community
