= Little Nicky (video game) =

2000 video game

- Developer: Digital Eclipse
- Publisher: Ubi Soft
- Producers: Yves Guilemot; Vincent Minoue; Mike Mika
- Designer: Lionel Rico
- Programmers: Adam Rippon; Mike Mika
- Artists: Luc Verhulst; Tom Lisowski
- Composer: Robert Baffy
- Platform: Game Boy Color
- Release: NA: December 23, 2000
- Genre: Platform
- Mode: Single-player

Little Nicky is a 2000 licensed platform game developed by Digital Eclipse and published by Ubi Soft for the Game Boy Color. Based on the comedy film of the same name, the game was released exclusively in North America. The player controls the half-demon/angel Nicky and utilizes his demonic powers in order to traverse 24 levels inspired by events from the titular film. Outside of the main game, the player can also partake in five different minigames. Critical reception towards the game was mixed, with many reviewers praising its visuals and risqué elements, while a myriad of reactions were given towards the game's audio and gameplay.

== Gameplay ==
Nicky standing near a vehicle's exhaust pipe to fill up his heat meter.

Little Nicky is a side-scrolling platform game based on the 2000 comedy film of the same name. The player controls the half-demon/angel Nicky, who utilizes demonic powers such as possession and flaming belches in order to progress. At the start of a level these powers are unable to be used, and need to be unlocked by filling up a meter. This is accomplished by the player standing near a source of heat, which additionally gives them faster movement speed and higher jumping, but if the player stands near one for too long they will be unable to use their demonic abilities for a short period. Additionally, the player has four health points which, when depleted by hitting enemies or obstacles, causes them to lose a life; with all lives being lost resulting in a game over.

The player traverses through 24 levels inspired by key events from the titular film. Most of them have traditional objectives that require the player to either reach the level's end point or complete a specific task in them, such as collecting a certain amount of objects. However, three levels feature a boss that must be fought to finish the stage, with one of those centering around the player needing to make five basketball shots on a hoop before a timer runs out. Outside of the main game, the player can participate in five minigames: fishing, darts, a shooting gallery, pineapple throwing, and "Satanhead", which allows the player to create a face from a variety of different parts. Darts can be played with a second player by taking turns playing on a shared system, while "Satanhead" allows the player to print their results using a Game Boy Printer.

== Development and release ==
The game was developed by Digital Eclipse, who had previously worked on handheld Game Boy Color iterations of licensed games such as NFL Blitz 2000 (1999) and Tarzan (1999). It was published by Ubi Soft, in collaboration with New Line Cinema, to promote the launch of the Adam Sandler film Little Nicky. Sandler served as an executive producer on the project, representing his production company Happy Madison, and, alongside supporting actors Allen Covert and Steven Brill, lent minor vocal work for some of its characters. Little Nicky was first announced to the public at the E3 2000 gaming convention on May 13, 2000, via a short video featuring Sandler. The game would eventually release on December 23, 2000 exclusively in North America.

== Reception ==
Reception

Aggregate score
Aggregator	Score
GameRankings	67.75%

Review scores
Publication	Score
AllGame	3/5
Electronic Gaming Monthly	8.5/10
GameSpot	4/10
IGN	8/10
Nintendo Power	6.6/10
Pocket Games	8.5/10

The game garnered mixed reception from critics according to review aggregator website GameRankings. Generally, reviewers viewed it as a quality handheld title that effectively leveraged its license. Johnathan Dudlak of Pocket Games praised it as highly entertaining, while Ethan Einhorn of Electronic Gaming Monthly felt that the game was astoundingly good in various ways. Frank Provo of GameSpot wrote more negatively on the game, describing the play experience overall as "unpleasant", but noted how other parts of its presentation were done well.

The gameplay was the most divisive aspect of Little Nicky. Level design was seen as a generally positive aspect, providing a varied and enthralling amount of challenges to overcome. Craig Harris of IGN felt some of the levels' difficulty was too high, with many enemies and obstacles to traverse at a given moment. Einhorn wrote about the title's length being too short while Provo derided the player control for jerky hit detection from obstacles and enemies, as well as slippery movement. The heating mechanic and Nicky's demonic abilities were viewed by Harris as an additional layer of depth, however Provo wrote that the latter, aside from levels requiring them, didn't serve much of a purpose overall.

Many reviewers had mixed opinions on the game's sound design, which was regarded by Provo as "poorly sampled"; highlighting in particular its heavy metal rock soundtrack and Sandler's voice clips. Dudlak and Einhorn however labeled it as high quality for a Game Boy Color title, with the former describing it as "first-rate" and the latter as "impressive" respectively. Harris additionally viewed the audio as "super clear" and cited it as the best part of the game.

Critics praised its visuals, particularly highlighting the game's character animations and level environment details. Provo described the environments as "hilarious", "earthly", and a great representation of the film, with Einhorn additionally comparing its animations to that of a hand-drawn cartoon. However, some noted that visual glitches, such as sprite flickering, hindered the overall experience.

Some reviewers wrote that the title's selling point, its usage of risqué and low-brow elements, was a highlight of the game. Einheart praised their use as a great adaptation of its source material, while Dudlak summarized the inclusion as making the game "genuinely funny". Harris and Provo also appreciated its implementation into the minigames, with Harris commenting on the "gory" theming of darts and Provo joking about the "Satanface" activity.
