= Super Mario Bros. Deluxe =

1999 video game

- Developer: Nintendo R&D2
- Publisher: Nintendo
- Director: Toshiaki Suzuki
- Producers: Masayuki Uemura; Kazuhiko Taniguchi
- Designers: Shigeru Miyamoto; Takashi Tezuka
- Composers: Yuichi Ozaki; Masami Yone
- Series: Super Mario
- Platform: Game Boy Color
- Release: NA: May 10, 1999; UK: December 1999; JP: March 1, 2000 (Note: Only distributed on Nintendo Power)
- Genre: Platform
- Modes: Single player, multiplayer

Super Mario Bros. Deluxe (Note: Japanese: スーパーマリオブラザーズデラックス, Hepburn: Sūpā Mario Burazāzu Derakkusu) (also known as Super Mario Bros. DX) is a 1999 platform game developed and published by Nintendo for the Game Boy Color. It is a largely unaltered port of the 1985 Super Mario Bros., originally released for the Nintendo Entertainment System (NES), with an unlockable version of its 1986 Japanese sequel, Super Mario Bros.: The Lost Levels. The game also introduces several new features, including a single-player and two-player race mode, a challenge mode for individual levels, and various toys and collectibles, some of which utilize the functionality of the Game Boy Printer.

Upon release, Super Mario Bros. Deluxe received widespread acclaim. Critics praised its faithful adaptation of Super Mario Bros. on the Game Boy Color, as well as the additional gameplay modes and features, with minor criticism directed at the gameplay effects of the smaller screen size compared to the NES. Retrospective reception of Deluxe has praised the game as one of the best titles released for the Game Boy system. The game was also a commercial success, remaining on sales charts for two years and being one of the highest-selling video games of 1999 and 2000.

== Gameplay ==
Deluxe features platforming gameplay largely similar to the original, allowing players to control Mario or Luigi through the 32 levels of Super Mario Bros., referred to in the game as Original 1985. The game retains the pixel graphics of the original but with a smaller resolution to fit the screen of the Game Boy Color. The game features screen scrolling to reflect this change, and players can use the vertical directional buttons to scroll the screen up or down. Players can also save the progress of their game at any time.

=== Additions ===
In Challenge Mode, levels end with an evaluation of players' scores and collected items.

Challenge Mode is an additional mode that allows players to replay completed levels with the objective of achieving the highest score and locating items across the level, including five red coins and a hidden Yoshi egg in each level. Players select individual levels and complete them in a single attempt. Upon completion, Toad will provide the player with a rating based on their performance in reaching a threshold score, collecting the five red coins in a level, and discovering the hidden Yoshi. The Vs. mode allows two players to compete in a race to the end of a level by using two Game Boy Colors connected with a Game Link Cable. Vs. levels feature vanishing blocks that can be triggered by a player to hide or reveal obstacles. A similar single-player mode titled You vs. Boo is available where the player races Boo across the same courses. In this mode, when players complete a level, Boo's speed is set to the best time set by the player.

Players are able to unlock additional game features and collectables through completing several actions in the game. The main addition is the ability to play The Lost Levels when the player reaches a minimum score of 300,000 points in the original mode. Other unlockable features are included in a Toy Box menu. These include a calendar that allows players to set marks or notes for dates between 1999 and 3000. The fortune teller allows players to select one of five cards, with the results reflecting levels of luck, providing extra lives the first time they receive an Extremely Lucky card. The Yoshi Finder scrolls through random levels and displays a frame in which a hidden Yoshi can be found in the Challenge mode. As players progress in the game, they will collect awards, pictures and banners that can be printed using the Game Boy Printer.

== Development and release ==
Development of Deluxe was led by Nintendo director Toshiaki Suzuki in the Nintendo Research & Development 2 team, a small team dedicated to hardware peripherals and software. Deluxe was Suzuki's directorial debut, with Nintendo assigning his team to recreate Super Mario Bros. and The Legend of Zelda: Link's Awakening for the Game Boy Color, along with a few additional features. The team worked closely with Shigeru Miyamoto and Toshihiko Nakago, the designer and programmer of the original game. Suzuki stated that the development process had little pressure in the belief that the game would regardless be enjoyable and sell well. The developers developed and demonstrated a one-level prototype of Deluxe prior to the commercial release of the Game Boy Color. As an early Game Boy Color title, Deluxe was the first full-colour Mario title to appear on a handheld. The game was released in North America on May 10, 1999, and in the United Kingdom in December 1999. In Japan, Deluxe did not receive a commercial release but was distributed starting March 1, 2000, on Nintendo Power kiosks in Lawson stores, where consumers could have the game copied onto a memory cartridge.

== Reception ==
=== Sales ===
Following release, Deluxe sold 2.8 million units in the United States. According to NPD sales charts, Deluxe ranked as the twelfth top selling video game on all platforms in the United States in 1999, and the fourteenth best-selling game in 2000. The game peaked in third place for weekly handheld sales charts in June 1999, and remained in overall weekly sales charts into 2001.

=== Critical reviews ===
Reception

Aggregate score
Aggregator	Score	
Aggregator	3DS	GBC
GameRankings	N/A	92%

Review scores
Publication	Score	
Publication	3DS	GBC
AllGame	N/A	4.5/5
Computer and Video Games	N/A	4/5
Electronic Gaming Monthly	N/A	9.5/10, 8.5/10, 8.5/10, 8.5/10
Game Informer	N/A	9.25/10
GameSpot	N/A	9.9/10
IGN	N/A	10/10
Nintendo Life	6/10	10/10
Nintendo World Report	9/10	N/A

Deluxe was met with critical acclaim upon release, with an average score of 92% according to review aggregator GameRankings.

Critics praised the additional modes and features. Describing Deluxe as the "killer app" for the Game Boy Color, Cameron Davis of GameSpot wrote that Nintendo had "pulled out the stops" to deliver rewards and "cool diversions" for players. Electronic Gaming Monthly considered the game's additions and extras to add "challenge" and "tons of replay value" to the game, specially noting the game's two-player mode as a "blast". Craig Harris of IGN praised the inclusion of a save feature, unlockable items and secrets. He gave special mention to the versus mode, describing it as a "cool use" of the original engine and "worth the purchase of another cartridge just for this feature alone". Martin Kitts of Planet Game Boy described the game's additions as "packed to bursting point" with features and assessed it as "arguably the most complete Game Boy title ever made". Many critics also praised the decision to include The Lost Levels in the game.

Reviewers praised the faithfulness and quality of the game's port of Super Mario Bros. Describing the game as a "dead-on carbon copy" of the graphics and music of Super Mario Bros., Colin Williamson of Allgame highlighted the "bright" and "colorful" display of the Game Boy screen. Craig Harris of IGN considered the recreation to be "pixel-perfect" and a "perfect translation", calling the game "the Game Boy Color-specific game to own" and anticipating the game would prompt a "revolution of porting NES games to the handheld". Computer and Video Games also noted the game "plays wonderfully" and was unchanged from the original game. Cameron Davis of GameSpot described the game as a "still perfect" version of Mario Bros., praising the preservation of "every secret, bonus, bug and warp" and the fact "no compromises" were made with the game's graphics. Nintendo Life wrote, "It may just be our hazy 80s memory, but we think that the colors look even more vibrant on the Game Boy Color."

Some reviewers noted the smaller screen of the Game Boy Color compared to the NES version. Colin Williamson of Allgame considered the adjustment of the screen when jumping was a "major pain" when facing vertical platforms or enemies such as Lakitu. Electronic Gaming Monthly noted "minor problems" with the game's vertical scrolling for limiting visibility. Cameron Davis of GameSpot assessed that the game's camera issues were a trade-off for the preservation of the game's graphics, calling the leaps of faith "annoying, but better than the alternative".

=== Retrospective reception ===
Many critics have retrospectively assessed Deluxe as one of the best games released for the Game Boy system due to its enhancements of the original game. Jeremy Parish of USGamer described the game as a "comprehensive overhaul" that added "considerably more" to the original game. Chris Scullion of Official Nintendo Magazine similarly expressed that Deluxe was the "definitive version" of the original game, and surpassed its quality. Darryn Bonthuys of GameSpot commended the game as "timeless" and one of the best for the handheld due to the "tons of new content that made the entire game feel like a brand-new experience to play". Graeme Mason of GamesRadar praised the game as one of the best games on the Game Boy Color, describing the "almost-perfect replication" of the original and the additional features as an "excellent value-for-money package". Gabe Gurwin of Digital Trends ranked the game as the eleventh-best Game Boy Color game, stating the color made the graphics "appear to pop off the screen" and noting the game had "plenty for newcomers to love". Gavin Lane of Nintendo Life also ranked Deluxe as the eleventh-best title for the system, assessing it as a "special" title that offered a "great version of the original game", although noting its additional features compensated for its "reduced view" on the "diminutive screen" of the Color. Ashley Day of Retro Gamer ranked the game as the third-best Game Boy Color title, describing it as "unmissable", a perfect recreation of the original, and one of the first Game Boy Color titles to "use the full power" of the platform. In describing Super Mario Bros. as the fourth-best Mario Bros. title of all time, Chris Tapsell of Eurogamer noted that Deluxe warranted "special mention" for its additions to the original game including the challenge mode and world map, considering it to be a better version to the original game.
