= Alice in Wonderland (2000 video game) =

- European cover art
- Developer: Digital Eclipse
- Publisher: Nintendo
- Director: Mike Mika
- Producers: William Baffy; Dean Sitton
- Programmers: Jeremy Mika; Mike Mika
- Artist: Tom Barlow
- Composer: Robert Baffy
- Platform: Game Boy Color
- Release: NA: October 4, 2000; EU: April 20, 2001
- Genre: Platformer
- Modes: Multiplayer, single-player

Alice in Wonderland is a 2000 platform video game developed by Digital Eclipse and published by Nintendo for the Game Boy Color. It was released in North America on October 4, 2000. The game follows the plot of the 1951 animated film of the same name.

== Gameplay ==
The game's visual style closely follows the 1951 animated Disney film. The cutscenes follow the plot of the film.

Alice in Wonderland follows the plot of the 1951 animated Disney film of the same name. The game begins with the player as Alice following the White Rabbit down its hole. The plot is used to change the level design from stage to stage, and gives the player a more varied experience through gameplay.

The game changes the level design based on different stages from the film. Alice changes sizes throughout the game, which makes the platform gameplay feel different throughout the game. Levels often deviate from the main platform areas and include other types of sections: one example is where Alice is placed in her miniature form into a bottle and must navigate rapids. The game includes Game Boy Printer support.

== Reception ==
Reception

Aggregate score
Aggregator	Score
GameRankings	74%

Review scores
Publication	Score
AllGame	3/5
Electronic Gaming Monthly	7.5/10
GameFan	88%
GameSpot	9/10
IGN	8/10
Jeuxvideo.com	14/20
Nintendo Power	6.9/10

Alice in Wonderland received above-average reviews according to the review aggregation website GameRankings. GameSpot's Tim Tracy felt that the game offered some of the best graphics and gameplay for any portable system. He felt that the game's sound was its weak point. IGN's Craig Harris felt that the game's platform variety was one of its strongest points. He questioned, however, the inclusion difficult areas which could only be completed through trial and error; he thought that younger children playing the game would have difficulty getting past the sections.

The game was a runner-up for GameSpot's annual "Best Game Boy Color Game" award, losing to Dragon Warrior I & II.

== See also ==
- Alice's Adventures in Wonderland, original 1865 Lewis Carroll novel
