= Mickey's Speedway USA =

2000 racing video game

- North American Nintendo 64 box art
- Developer: Rare
- Publisher: Nintendo
- Composer: Ben Cullum
- Platforms: Nintendo 64; Game Boy Color
- Release: Nintendo 64: NA: November 13, 2000; EU: December 1, 2000; Game Boy Color: EU: March 23, 2001; NA: March 25, 2001
- Genre: Kart racing
- Modes: Single-player, multiplayer

Mickey's Speedway USA is a kart racing game developed by Rare and published by Nintendo for the Nintendo 64 and Game Boy Color. It is Rare and Nintendo's second collaboration with Disney Interactive following Mickey's Racing Adventure (1999), and features characters from the Mickey Mouse universe racing across the United States. The Nintendo 64 game released in November 2000 to mixed reception, while the Game Boy Color version followed in March 2001.

== Gameplay ==
A screenshot of the Nintendo 64 version showing a race in Indianapolis, with the player controlling Mickey Mouse

Mickey's Speedway USA begins with a brief cutscene explaining the game's premise: The Weasels have kidnapped Mickey's dog, Pluto, due to mistaking the glass beads on his collar for diamonds. Professor Ludwig von Drake builds race cars to help Mickey and his friends search for Pluto, and they travel across America following a series of postcards left by the Weasels.

Six playable characters are included in both versions of the game. These default characters are paired in statistics: Mickey and Donald have average statistics, Minnie and Daisy focus on handling and acceleration, and Goofy and Pete have a concentration in speed and weight. In the N64 version, completing objectives in Grand Prix mode will unlock three additional characters, consisting of Dewey, Louie, and Von Drake; a fourth character, Huey, can be unlocked by connecting to the GBC version through the Transfer Pak.

Standard racing gameplay consists of six racers competing to finish three laps around a track before their opponents. Scattered along each track are "Oomph Tokens" that increase racers' maximum speed, boosters which will give racers a quick burst of acceleration, and items that can be used to interfere with opponents, such as baseballs and paint cans. The Nintendo 64 (N64) version features gameplay similar to Rare's previous N64 racing game Diddy Kong Racing (1997), while the Game Boy Color (GBC) version uses the same isometric perspective as its predecessor, Mickey's Racing Adventure (1999).

Both versions include a Grand Prix mode, a time trial mode, and multiplayer racing modes. Each Grand Prix is playable at three difficulty levels; earning a gold trophy for each one will unlock new characters, cheats and other features. The N64 version includes a practice mode, a multiplayer battle mode with four arenas, and unlockable cheats to modify gameplay, while the GBC version includes "driving school" tutorial missions and a gallery of unlockable images, which can be printed out using the Game Boy Printer.

Each version of the game features twenty different race tracks spread across five Grands Prix, all themed after famous American cities and locations such as Los Angeles, Washington, D.C. and the Grand Canyon. The selection of track locations differs between versions. In the N64 version, four special vehicle parts are hidden in different race tracks; all four must be collected to unlock the final Grand Prix. An additional bonus track can be unlocked in the N64 version through a hidden Easter egg, and in the GBC version by connecting to a copy of Mickey's Racing Adventure using the system's infrared port.

== Development ==
In May 1999, Nintendo announced plans to publish several Mickey Mouse games for its consoles over the following three years, to be developed by Rare. The company confirmed in November of that year that Mickey's Speedway USA would be released during the 2000 holiday season. The game had a marketing budget of $5 million.

== Reception ==
Reception

Aggregate scores
Aggregator	Score	
Aggregator	GBC	N64
GameRankings	81%	68%
Metacritic	N/A	71/100

Review scores
Publication	Score	
Publication	GBC	N64
AllGame	N/A	3/5
Electronic Gaming Monthly	4.5/10, 7/10, 6.5/10	6/10, 5/10, 6/10
Game Informer	6/10	6/10
GameFan	N/A	91%
GamePro	4/5	3/5
GameRevolution	N/A	C+
GameSpot	9/10	7.5/10
Hyper	N/A	77/100
IGN	9/10	6.8/10
Nintendo Life	N/A	6/10
Nintendo Power	3.5/5	7.4/10
Official Nintendo Magazine	N/A	92%
Video Games (DE)	N/A	91%

The Nintendo 64 version received "average" reviews according to video game review aggregator website Metacritic.

Matthew Byrd, writing for Den of Geek in 2017, said that Mickey's Speedway USA could not compete to other similar titles like Diddy Kong Racing, Mario Kart 64, or Crash Team Racing, due to its courses being not nearly as "inventive" (only basic recreations of US locations), its power-ups as "little slim", its "problematic" artificial intelligence, and its roster of karts and tracks as "thin". Despite its flaws, he thought that Rare managed to produce an engagingly charming and functional kart racing title.

== See also ==
- List of Disney video games
