= Mickey's Racing Adventure =

1999 video game

- Developer: Rare
- Publisher: Nintendo
- Designer: Gavin Hood
- Programmers: Trevor Attwood; Richard Brough
- Artists: Johnni Christensen; Keri Gunn
- Composer: David Wise
- Platform: Game Boy Color
- Release: NA: November 22, 1999; EU: November 25, 1999
- Genres: Racing, Kart racing, adventure
- Mode: Single-player

Mickey's Racing Adventure is a 1999 racing video game developed by Rare and published by Nintendo for the Game Boy Color. It was followed by Mickey's Speedway USA in 2001.

== Gameplay ==
Mickey's Racing Adventure is a single-player racing game with adventure elements. It is played from an isometric perspective and races consist of land or water tracks.

== Development and release ==
Mickey's Racing Adventure was developed by Rare over the course of approximately six months. It is the company's second Game Boy Color game. It includes extra mini-games based on Guttang Gottong. It supports the Game Boy Color's infrared port to transmit data between machines, including unlocking a secret track in Mickey's Speedway USA. The game was released in November 1999.

== Reception ==
Reception

Aggregate score
Aggregator	Score
GameRankings	83.75% (4 reviews)

Review scores
Publication	Score
AllGame	4.5/5
GameSpot	9/10
IGN	8/10
N64 Magazine	4/5
Nintendo Power	8/10
Nintendo, le Magazine Officiel	92%

Mickey's Racing Adventure received positive reviews from critics. IGN reviewer Craig Harris felt that it was Rare's "first real quality Game Boy Color-exclusive title" after their "atrocious" Conker's Pocket Tales, while GameSpot praised the number of tracks and characters to choose from, stating that Mickey's Racing Adventure "shows how Game Boy racers should be done". N64 Magazine said that the game successfully combines the exploration aspects of Rare's Diddy Kong Racing with the racing style of R.C. Pro-Am for the Nintendo Entertainment System, but criticised the lack of a multiplayer mode. Game Informer gave the game an overall score of 8 out of 10 noting the game being well designed, especially for a Disney game, and commenting that the game has plenty of racing courses, characters, power ups and vehicle upgrades.
