= Game Boy Printer =

Printing accessory for the Nintendo Game Boy series of handheld games consoles

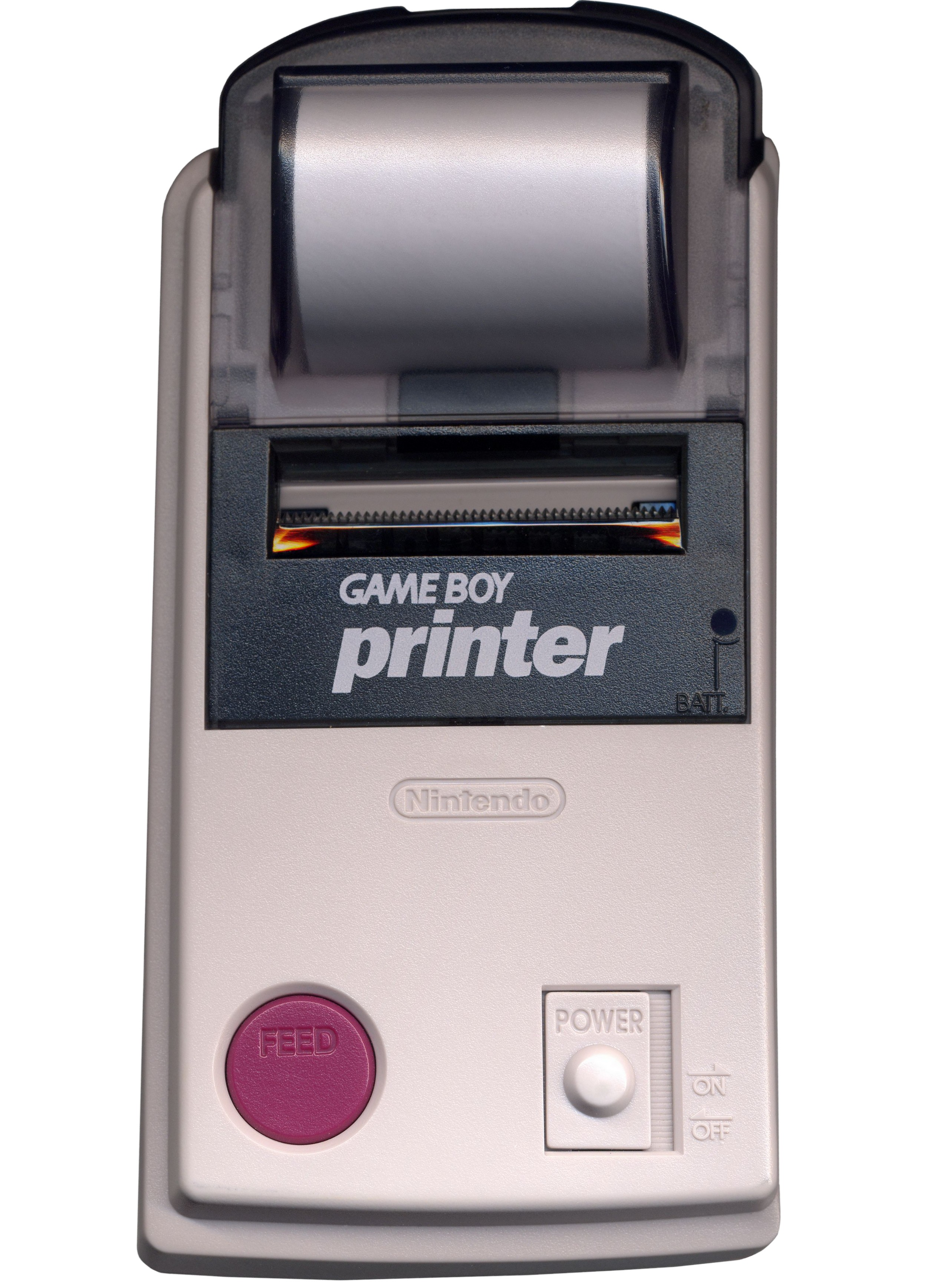
- Manufacturer: Nintendo
- Product family: Game Boy line
- Type: Video game accessory, thermal printer
- Generation: Fourth generation
- Released: JP: February 21, 1998; NA: June 1, 1998; PAL: June 4, 1998
- Introductory price: ¥5,800; US$59.95

The Game Boy Printer, known as the Pocket Printer (Note: Japanese: ポケットプリンタ, Hepburn: Poketto Purinta) in Japan, is a thermal printer accessory released by Nintendo. It allows users to print special images from over 100 compatible Game Boy and Game Boy Color games onto thermal paper, which can then be applied as stickers. The accessory was designed primarily for use with the Game Boy Camera, which it released alongside in 1998.

== Overview ==
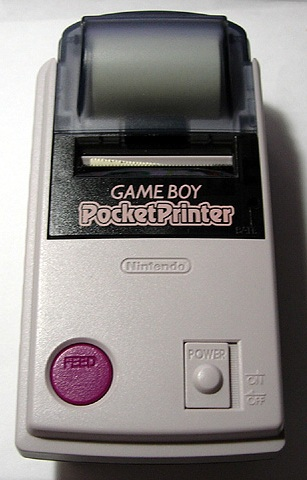
The Japanese version, known as the Pocket Printer

The Game Boy Printer was originally designed by Hirokazu Tanaka for use with the Game Boy Camera. It connects to the Game Boy through the system's EXT port, similar to the Game Link Cable. As different Game Boy models feature differently-sized ports, the printer is packaged with a "Universal Game Link Cable" that features multiple connector types. The device is compatible with all Game Boy models except the Game Boy Micro, which cannot play Game Boy and Game Boy Color games.

The printer requires six AA batteries for power. It uses a proprietary 38mm wide thermal paper with adhesive backing, though printed images are only 22mm in width. The printer is only capable of printing monochrome images; to compensate, Nintendo sold paper rolls in multiple colors. New paper rolls were sold at a price of ¥500 in Japan and US$9.95 in the United States, and could print an estimated 100 images each. Once printed, the adhesive backing allowed the images to be applied as stickers.

In Japan, a Pokémon-themed version of the printer was released in September 1998 alongside Pokémon Yellow.

== Games with Game Boy Printer support ==
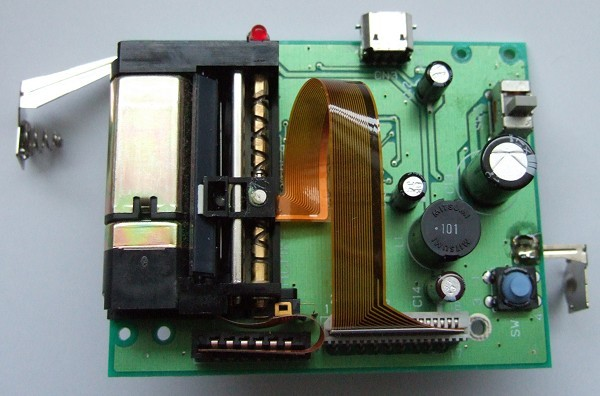
Internal components of the Game Boy Printer

The Game Boy Printer was primarily intended to act as a companion to the Game Boy Camera, allowing players to print their photographs. However, multiple other games released between 1998 and 2001 featured support for the Game Boy Printer, allowing players to print their high scores or special unlockable images. The first game to be designed with printer compatibility was Pokémon Yellow, which allowed players to print out any Pokémon's Pokédex entry; this feature would be carried forward to later Pokémon series entries on the system.

The following is a list of 110 games that support the Game Boy Printer, only 35 of which were released outside of Japan.

- 1942
- Alice in Wonderland
- Animal Breeder 3 (Japan only)
- Animal Breeder 4 (Japan only)
- AquaLife (Japan only)
- Asteroids
- Austin Powers: Oh, Behave!
- Austin Powers: Welcome to My Underground Lair!
- Cardcaptor Sakura: Itsumo Sakura-chan to Issho! (Japan only)
- Cardcaptor Sakura: Tomoe Shōgakkō Daiundōkai (Japan only)
- Chee-Chai Alien (Japan only)
- Columns GB: Tezuka Ozamu Characters (Japan only)
- Cross Hunter: Monster Hunter Version (Japan only)
- Cross Hunter: Treasure Hunter Version (Japan only)
- Cross Hunter: X Hunter Version (Japan only)
- Daa! Daa! Daa! Totsuzen ★ Card de Battle de Uranai!? (Japan only)
- Daikaijuu Monogatari: The Miracle of the Zone II (Japan only)
- Dejiko no Mahjong Party (Japan only)
- Densha de Go! 2 (Japan only)
- Dino Breeder 3: Gaia Fukkatsu (Japan only)
- Disney's Dinosaur
- Disney's Tarzan
- Donkey Kong Country
- Doraemon Kart 2 (Japan only)
- Doraemon Memories: Nobita no Omoide Daibouken (Japan only)
- Doraemon no GameBoy de Asobouyo DX10 (Japan only)
- Doraemon no Quiz Boy (Japan only)
- Dungeon Savior (Japan only)
- E.T.: Digital Companion
- Fairy Kitty no Kaiun Jiten: Yousei no Kuni no Uranai Shugyou (Japan only)
- Fisher-Price Rescue Heroes: Fire Frenzy
- Game Boy Camera
- Golf Ou: The King of Golf (Japan only)
- Hamster Club (Japan only)
- Hamster Paradise (Japan only)
- Hamster Paradise 2 (Japan only)
- Harvest Moon 2
- Hello Kitty no Beads Koubou (Japan only)
- Hello Kitty no Magical Museum (Japan only)
- Jinsei Game: Tomedachi Takusan Tsukurouyo! (Japan only)
- Kakurenbo Battle Monster Tactics (Japan only)
- Kanji Boy (Japan only)
- Karamuchou wa Oosawagi!: Okawari! (Japan only)
- Karamuchou wa Oosawagi!: Porinkiis to Okashina Nakamatachi (Japan only)
- Kaseki Sousei Reborn II: Monster Digger (Japan only)
- Kettō Transformers Beast Wars: Beast Senshi Saikyō Ketteisen (Japan only)
- Kidou Senkan Nadesico: Ruri Ruri Mahjong (Japan only)
- Klax
- Konchuu Hakase 2 (Japan only)
- The Legend of Zelda: Link's Awakening DX
- The Little Mermaid 2: Pinball Frenzy
- Little Nicky
- Logical
- Love Hina Pocket (Japan only)
- Magical Drop
- Majokko Mari-chan no Kisekae Monogatari (Japan only)
- Mary-Kate and Ashley: Pocket Planner
- McDonald's Monogatari: Honobono Tenchou Ikusei Game (Japan only)
- Mickey's Racing Adventure
- Mickey's Speedway USA
- Mission: Impossible
- Monster ★ Race Okawari (Japan only)
- Monster ★ Race 2 (Japan only)
- Nakayoshi Cooking Series 1: Oishii Cake Okusan (Japan only)
- Nakayoshi Cooking Series 2: Oishii Panya-San (Japan only)
- Nakayoshi Cooking Series 3: Tanoshii Obentou (Japan only)
- Nakayoshi Cooking Series 4: Tanoshii Dessert (Japan only)
- Nakayoshi Cooking Series 5: Komugi-Chan no Cake o Tsukurou! (Japan only)
- Nakayoshi Pet Series 1: Kawaii Hamster (Japan only)
- Nakayoshi Pet Series 2: Kawaii Usagi (Japan only)
- Nakayoshi Pet Series 3: Kawaii Koinu (Japan only)
- Nakayoshi Pet Series 4: Kawaii Koneko (Japan only)
- Nakayoshi Pet Series 5: Kawaii Hamster 2 (Japan only)
- NFL Blitz
- Nintama Rantarou: Ninjutsu Gakuen ni Nyuugakushou no Dan (Japan only)
- Ojarumaru: Mitsunegai Jinja no Ennichi de Ojaru! (Japan only)
- Pachinko Data Card: Chou Ataru-kun (Japan only)
- Perfect Dark
- Pocket Family GB (Japan only)
- Pocket Family GB2 (Japan only)
- Pocket Kanjirou (Japan only)
- Pocket Puyo Puyo~n (Japan only)
- Pokémon Card GB2: Great Rocket-Dan Sanjō! (Japan only)
- Pokémon Crystal
- Pokémon Gold
- Pokémon Pinball
- Pokémon Silver
- Pokémon Trading Card Game
- Pokémon Yellow: Special Pikachu Edition
- Pro Mahjong Tsuwamono GB (Japan only)
- Purikura Pocket 3: Talent Debut Daisakusen (Japan only)
- Puzzled
- Quest for Camelot
- RPG Tsukuuru GB (Japan only)
- Roadsters
- Sanrio Timenet: Kako Hen (Japan only)
- Sanrio Timenet: Mirai Hen (Japan only)
- Shin Seiki Evangelion: Mahjong Hokan Keikaku (Japan only)
- Soukoban Densetsu: Hikari to Yami no Kuni (Japan only)
- Super Black Bass Pocket 3 (Japan only)
- Super Mario Bros. Deluxe
- Sweet Ange (Japan only)
- Sylvanian Families: Otogi no Kuni no Pendant (Japan only)
- Sylvanian Families 2: Irozuku Mori no Fantasy (Japan only)
- Sylvanian Families 3: Hoshi Furu Yoru no Sunadokei (Japan only)
- Tales of Phantasia: Narikiri Dungeon (Japan only)
- Tony Hawk's Pro Skater 2
- Trade & Battle: Card Hero (Japan only)
- Tsuri Sensei 2 (Japan only)
- VS Lemmings (Japan only)

Some games intended to feature Game Boy Printer support, such as Pokémon Picross and Hello Kitty Pocket Camera, were never released. During development of Pokémon Snap (1999), Satoru Iwata experimented with transferring photos to the Game Boy Camera using the Transfer Pak so that they could be printed using the Game Boy Printer; however, the development team found the resulting image quality to be insufficient, and the feature was abandoned in favor of printing stickers through print stations at specific retailers.

== Legacy ==
Due to the discontinuation of its proprietary printer paper and the impermanence of thermal printing, the Game Boy Printer does not see significant use in the modern day. As a result, hobbyists have developed alternate homebrew methods to transfer printer images from the Game Boy to more modern devices.

Some homebrew games developed since the system's discontinuation have featured Game Boy Printer support. The instax mini Link, a printer released by Fujifilm in 2021 which allows images to be printed from a Nintendo Switch, has also drawn comparisons to the Game Boy Printer by the gaming press.
