= The Legend of Zelda: Link's Awakening DX =

1998 video game

The Legend of Zelda: Link’s Awakening DX
- North American cover art
- Developer: Nintendo R&D2
- Publisher: Nintendo
- Director: Yohinori Tsuchiyama
- Series: The Legend of Zelda
- Platform: Game Boy Color
- Release: JP: December 12, 1998; NA: December 15, 1998; EU: January 1999; AU: January 22, 1999
- Genre: Action-adventure
- Mode: Single-player

The Legend of Zelda: Link's Awakening DX (Note: Known in Japan as Zelda no Densetsu: Yume o Miru Shima DX (Japanese: ゼルダの伝説 夢をみる島DX, Hepburn: Zeruda no Densetsu: Yume o Miru Shima Derakkusu; lit. "The Legend of Zelda: The Dreaming Island Deluxe")) is a 1998 action-adventure game developed and published by Nintendo for the Game Boy Color. The game is a colorized version of the 1993 Game Boy title The Legend of Zelda: Link's Awakening, in which protagonist Link must fight monsters, explore dungeons and solve puzzles to escape from Koholint Island. The DX version of Link's Awakening features gameplay additions including a color-themed dungeon and support for the Game Boy Printer.

Upon release, Link's Awakening DX was critically acclaimed, with reviewers commending the game on the strengths of the original title and welcoming the addition of color graphics and new features, although noting the additions were largely insubstantial compared to the original game. The DX version of Link's Awakening has retrospectively been cited by critics as one of the best games for the Game Boy and Game Boy Color systems. It was subsequently re-released on the Nintendo 3DS via the Virtual Console and the Nintendo Switch via the Nintendo Classics service.

== Gameplay ==
The graphics of Link's Awakening were colorised in DX to take advantage of the features of the Game Boy Color.

Link's Awakening DX is an action-adventure game played in a top-down perspective in which players guide Link, stranded on Koholint Island, through a quest to collect the eight Instruments of the Sirens to awaken the Wind Fish and leave the island. Players progress the game by exploring the open world island and completing a series of dungeons, requiring the completion of puzzles and defeating enemies, to acquire new items, such as a hookshot, that provide access to new and previously inaccessible parts of the island. Link's Awakening DX is a version of the game that features fully colorised graphics, although it is backward compatible in monochrome with the original Game Boy. The game includes features compatible with the Game Boy Printer accessory through the addition of a photo album. The player also can visit an in-game Camera Shop, meeting a photographer who will appear to take pictures of Link over the course of twelve events in the game. Once taken, these pictures can be viewed by the player in the photo album or used to print out stickers using the Game Boy Printer connected via a Game Link Cable.

An additional hidden dungeon, named the Color Dungeon, is also included in the game, featuring color-based puzzles including color-coded enemies and switches. Completion of the dungeon allows the player to select one of two items: the Red Tunic, which increases the player's attack power, and the Blue Tunic, which decreases the damage taken by the player. Link's Awakening DX also modifies the hints given by statues in dungeons throughout the game to provide additional guidance to the player.

== Development and release ==
Development of Link's Awakening DX was led by director Yohinori Tsuchiyama and undertaken by the Nintendo Research & Development 2 team, a small team dedicated to hardware peripherals and software. The game had minimal supervision from Takashi Tezuka, the director of the 1993 game, who was involved at the time as a supervisor for The Legend of Zelda: Ocarina of Time. For the Color Dungeon, Yuichi Ozaki created a musical piece based on Koji Kondo's dungeon theme from the original The Legend of Zelda.

An emulated version of Link's Awakening DX was released on the Nintendo 3DS Virtual Console on 7 June 2011. The game received minor updates to make use of the 3DS hardware, including the extension of the game's display to the larger 3DS screen, analog controls with the 3DS Circle Pad, and the inclusion of options to suspend, save and restore gameplay at any time. In July 2013, Link's Awakening DX was offered as one of several Virtual Console games which "elite status" members of the North America Club Nintendo could redeem as a free gift. Another emulated version was released as part of the Nintendo Classics service in February 2023.

In December 2023, a fan-made port of Link's Awakening DX was released for PC, containing widescreen, zoom and high-framerate support, allowing the game to be played without transitions between screens. The port was shortly taken down following release after a takedown notice was issued by Nintendo on the basis of copyright infringement.

== Reception ==
Reception

Review scores
Publication	Score
AllGame	4.5/5
Computer and Video Games	5/5
Electronic Gaming Monthly	9.5/10, 9/10, 9.5/10, 9/10
IGN	9.5
Nintendo Life	10/10
RPGFan	83% / 85%
Total Game Boy	95%
Planet Game Boy	5/5

Link's Awakening DX was critically acclaimed upon release, with many reviewers recommending the game on the basis of the merits of the original title and its continuing appeal both for new and returning players. Critics generally agreed that the game's additions were welcomed but minimal in substance, with Electronic Gaming Monthly finding it to be not too different from the original, and Colin Williamson of Allgame describing the game as a "paint job" and "essentially the same game".

Reviewers praised the colorisation of the game. Electronic Gaming Monthly described the graphics as "sharp" and adding "vibrant life" to the game. Total Game Boy stated that the game's color was a major improvement on the graphics of the original game and helped objects and enemies in the environment "stand out tremendously". Although noting its graphics were "primitive" by the standards of 1999, Jes Bickham of Planet Game Boy considered the graphics to also be "more sharply defined" and "smoother-scrolling" compared to the original. RPGFan commended the "fair graphical improvement" of the game, but considered the colorization to be "shallow" and lacking in detail.

The addition of the Color Dungeon received mixed reception. Describing it as "lame" and a "total disappointment", Electronic Gaming Monthly considered the dungeon to be too short, easy to complete, and limited in puzzle variety. Paul Davies of Computer & Video Games considered the new dungeon to be "not so amazing". RPGFan critiqued the decision to confine color-coded objects such as switches to the Color Dungeon.

=== Retrospective reception ===
Many critics have retrospectively named Link's Awakening DX as one of the best games released for the Game Boy system, including Game Boy Official Magazine, Pocket Games, GamePro, and Nintendo Power. The game has also been identified as one of the best Game Boy Color games by Digital Trends, GameSpot, and TheGamer. Luke Albiges of Retro Gamer considered the game's addition of a "vivid" color pallette and new features to "breathe new life" into the game, highlighting the Color Dungeon for "expanding upon what was possible" in the original title. Gavin Lane of Nintendo Life described the game as "bursting with colour" and commended the pixel sprites, but felt the game did not add any "unmissable" additions to the original title. Stuart Gipp, also for Nintendo Life, considered DX to be a downgrade from the original due to its "unenjoyable extra dungeon" and "garish lick of paint that doesn't do the visuals any favors".

Several critics also provided favorable reviews of Link's Awakening DX upon its release on the Nintendo 3DS eShop. Nintendo Power describing the game as one of the best games available on the eShop. Jacob Crites of Nintendo Life found the game's port to the 3DS to "play better" than its predecessors, citing the "more fluid" analog controls and the inclusion of restore points. Similarly, Lucas M. Thomas of IGN generally praised the game, but considered the upscaled graphics to not be as sharp as the original and lamented the omission of the Game Boy Printer features. Abraham Ashton Liu of RPGFan similarly commended the value and quality of the game's addition to the eShop and the additional functionality of a save state compared to the "unwieldy and archaic" design of the original save system.
