= List of The Legend of Zelda media =

Many games in The Legend of Zelda series including some ports and remakes

The Legend of Zelda is a video game series created by Shigeru Miyamoto and Takashi Tezuka, and mainly developed and published by Nintendo. The series debuted with The Legend of Zelda (Note: Japanese: THE HYRULE FANTASY ゼルダの伝説, Hepburn: The Hyrule Fantasy: Zelda no Densetsu) in 1986. The Legend of Zelda video games have been developed exclusively for Nintendo video game consoles and handhelds, dating from the Family Computer Disk System to the Nintendo Switch 2. Spin-off titles, however, have been released on non-Nintendo systems. As of November 2026 the franchise's main series consists of 34 video games, including 21 original titles, 12 remakes and enhanced ports, (Note: These include: Link's Awakening DX; Ocarina of Time Master Quest; Ocarina of Time 3D; Four Swords Anniversary Edition; The Wind Waker HD; Majora's Mask 3D; Twilight Princess HD; Link's Awakening (Nintendo Switch); Skyward Sword HD; Breath of the Wild – Nintendo Switch 2 Edition; Tears of the Kingdom – Nintendo Switch 2 Edition; Ocarina of Time (Nintendo Switch 2)) and the collection The Legend of Zelda: Collector's Edition. As of 2007 over 52 million copies have been sold since the release of the first game. The franchise also includes an American cartoon adaptation, multiple comic book adaptations, as well as soundtracks.

Gameplay consists of a mixture of action, adventure, puzzle-solving, and role-playing video games. The series centers on Link, the protagonist and player character in all but one of the main series. Link is often given the task of saving the world from Ganon, the series' primary antagonist and is aided by Princess Zelda, a mortal reincarnation of the Goddess Hylia. Games in The Legend of Zelda series with 2D graphics feature side-scrolling or overhead view gameplay, while games with 3D graphics give the player a third-person or fixed overhead perspective. The franchise holds several Guinness World Records, including the first game with a battery-powered save feature and the longest-running action-adventure series.

== Video games ==
=== Main series ===
Title	Release	Release by system	Notes
The Legend of Zelda	JP: February 21, 1986; NA: August 22, 1987; PAL: November 15, 1987	1986 – Famicom Disk System; 1987 – Nintendo Entertainment System; 2003 – GameCube; 2004 – Game Boy Advance; 2006 – Wii Virtual Console; 2012 – 3DS Virtual Console; 2013 – Wii U Virtual Console; 2018 – Nintendo Classics	Designed by Shigeru Miyamoto as a "killer app" for the Famicom Disk System.; Released outside Japan for the Nintendo Entertainment System in 1987, becoming the first game to feature a battery-powered save function.; Helped popularize the action-adventure genre of video games.; Known in Japan as The Hyrule Fantasy: The Legend of Zelda. (Note: Japanese: The Hyrule Fantasyゼルダの伝説, Hepburn: The Hyrule Fantasy Zeruda no Densetsu); Re-released for the Japanese Family Computer as The Legend of Zelda 1 (Note: Japanese: ゼルダの伝説1) in 1994.; Included in The Legend of Zelda: Collector's Edition.
Zelda II: The Adventure of Link	JP: January 14, 1987; PAL: September 26, 1988; NA: December 1, 1988	1987 – Famicom Disk System; 1988 – Nintendo Entertainment System; 2003 – GameCube; 2004 – Game Boy Advance; 2007 – Wii Virtual Console; 2012 – 3DS Virtual Console; 2013 – Wii U Virtual Console; 2019 – Nintendo Classics	Direct sequel to the first game.; Shifted the main perspective to a side-scrolling view rather than the top-down view of its predecessor.; Fused aspects of role-playing games and platform games.; Commonly labeled the "black sheep" of the series due to its graphical and gameplay differences from the other games in the franchise.; Included in The Legend of Zelda: Collector's Edition.
The Legend of Zelda: A Link to the Past	JP: November 21, 1991; NA: April 13, 1992; PAL: September 24, 1992	1991 – Super Nintendo Entertainment System; 2002 – Game Boy Advance; 2006 – Wii Virtual Console; 2013 – Wii U Virtual Console; 2016 – 3DS Virtual Console; 2019 – Nintendo Classics	Known in Japan as Zeruda no Densetsu Kamigami no Toraifōsu. (Note: Japanese: ゼルダの伝説 神々のトライフォース; lit. The Legend of Zelda: Triforce of the Gods); Introduced two parallel worlds concept to the series.; Re-released in North America as part of Nintendo's Player's Choice line.; Game Boy Advance re-release includes a multi-player portion (The Legend of Zelda: Four Swords).
The Legend of Zelda: Link's Awakening	JP: June 6, 1993; NA: August 6, 1993; PAL: December 1, 1993	1993 – Game Boy	Known in Japan as Zeruda no Densetsu Yume o Miru Shima. (Note: Japanese: ゼルダの伝説 夢をみる島; lit. The Legend of Zelda: Dreaming Island); First title for a handheld console.
The Legend of Zelda: Ocarina of Time	JP: November 21, 1998; NA: November 23, 1998; PAL: December 11, 1998; CHN: November 2003	1998 – Nintendo 64; 2003 – GameCube; 2003 – iQue Player; 2007 – Wii Virtual Console; 2015 – Wii U Virtual Console 2021 – Nintendo Classics	The first 3D The Legend of Zelda game.; Sold 7.6 million copies worldwide and was the best-selling title in the series at the time.; First video game ever to receive a perfect score from Japanese gaming magazine Famitsu.; Included in The Legend of Zelda: Collector's Edition.
The Legend of Zelda: Majora's Mask	JP: April 27, 2000; NA: October 25, 2000; PAL: November 17, 2000	2000 – Nintendo 64; 2003 – GameCube; 2009 – Wii Virtual Console; 2016 – Wii U Virtual Console 2022 – Nintendo Classics	Takes place a few months after the events of The Legend of Zelda: Ocarina of Time and uses its game engine.; Features masks that transform the main character.; Noted for its darker tone and themes compared to other titles in the franchise.; First The Legend of Zelda title where Eiji Aonuma was the primary director.; Included in The Legend of Zelda: Collector's Edition.
The Legend of Zelda: Oracle of Seasons	JP: February 27, 2001; NA: May 13, 2001; PAL: October 5, 2001	2001 – Game Boy Color; 2013 – 3DS Virtual Console; 2023 – Nintendo Classics	Known in Japan as Zeruda no Densetsu Fushigi no Ki no Mi Daichi no Shō. (Note: Japanese: ゼルダの伝説 ふしぎの木の実 大地の章; lit. The Legend of Zelda: Nut of the Mysterious Tree: Chapter of Earth); Developed in conjunction with Capcom.; Features a season changing game mechanic.; Links with The Legend of Zelda: Oracle of Ages.
The Legend of Zelda: Oracle of Ages	JP: February 27, 2001; NA: May 13, 2001; PAL: October 5, 2001	2001 – Game Boy Color; 2013 – 3DS Virtual Console; 2023 – Nintendo Classics	Known in Japan as Zeruda no Densetsu Fushigi no Ki no Mi Jikū no Shō. (Note: Japanese: ゼルダの伝説 ふしぎの木の実 時空の章; lit. The Legend of Zelda: Nut of the Mysterious Tree: Chapter of Time and Space); Developed in conjunction with Capcom.; Features a time travel game mechanic.; Links with The Legend of Zelda: Oracle of Seasons.
The Legend of Zelda: A Link to the Past and Four Swords	NA: December 3, 2002; JP: March 14, 2003; PAL: March 28, 2003	2002 – Game Boy Advance; 2024 – Nintendo Classics	Port of The Legend of Zelda: A Link to the Past.; Includes a four-player adventure mode.; Four-player mode introduced multiplayer gameplay to the series.; Re-released in North America under the Player's Choice label.
The Legend of Zelda: The Wind Waker	JP: December 13, 2002; NA: March 24, 2003; PAL: May 2, 2003	2002 – GameCube; 2025 – Nintendo Classics	Known in Japan as Zeruda no Densetsu Kaze no Takuto. (Note: Japanese: ゼルダの伝説 風のタクト; lit. The Legend of Zelda: Baton of Wind); Features cel-shaded graphics.; Designed to reach a wider range of age groups.; Re-released in North America and Europe as part of Nintendo's Player's Choice line.
The Legend of Zelda: Four Swords Adventures	JP: March 18, 2004; NA: June 7, 2004; PAL: January 7, 2005; AU: April 7, 2005	2004 – GameCube	Known in Japan as Zelda no Densetsu Yottsu no Tsurugi Purasu. (Note: Japanese: ゼルダの伝説 4つの剣+; lit. The Legend of Zelda: Four Swords Plus); Allows for up to four players to play the game using Game Boy Advances and Game Link Cables.; Carried over stylistic elements from The Wind Waker.; Re-released in North America as part of Nintendo's Player's Choice line.
The Legend of Zelda: The Minish Cap	JP: November 4, 2004; PAL: November 12, 2004; NA: January 10, 2005; AU: April 7, 2005	2004 – Game Boy Advance; 2011 – 3DS Virtual Console; 2014 – Wii U Virtual Console; 2023 – Nintendo Classics	Known in Japan as Zeruda no Densetsu Fushigi no Bōshi. (Note: Japanese: ゼルダの伝説 ふしぎのぼうし; lit. The Legend of Zelda: The Mysterious Hat); Developed by Capcom; Features a shrinking game mechanic.; Released in Europe in a bundled package with a The Legend of Zelda-themed Game Boy Advance SP.
The Legend of Zelda: Twilight Princess	NA: November 19, 2006; JP: December 2, 2006; AU: December 7, 2006; PAL: December 8, 2006	2006 – GameCube; 2006 – Wii	Release was delayed so it could be ported to the Wii and released as a Wii launch title.; Features a gameplay mechanic in which Link has the power to turn into a wolf.; GameCube and Wii versions differ in that the Wii version supports 16:9 widescreen presentation and horizontally flips the in-game world to make Link right-handed.; First game in the series to receive a Teen rating.
The Legend of Zelda: Phantom Hourglass	JP: June 23, 2007; NA: October 1, 2007; AU: October 11, 2007; PAL: October 19, 2007	2007 – DS; 2016 – Wii U Virtual Console	Features touchscreen functionality and visuals similar to The Legend of Zelda: The Wind Waker.; Originally developed as The Legend of Zelda: Four Swords DS.; Takes place some time after the events of The Legend of Zelda: The Wind Waker and uses its cel-shaded visuals.; Also released in a bundled package with a The Legend of Zelda-themed DS.
The Legend of Zelda: Spirit Tracks	NA: December 7, 2009; AU: December 10, 2009; EU: December 11, 2009; JP: December 23, 2009	2009 – DS; 2016 – Wii U Virtual Console	Known in Japan as Zeruda no Densetsu Daichi no Kiteki. (Note: Japanese: ゼルダの伝説 大地の汽笛; lit. The Legend of Zelda: The Steam Whistle of Earth); Features touchscreen functionality and visuals similar to The Legend of Zelda: Phantom Hourglass.; Takes place one hundred years after the events of The Legend of Zelda: Phantom Hourglass.
The Legend of Zelda: Skyward Sword	EU: November 18, 2011; NA: November 20, 2011; JP: November 23, 2011; AU: November 24, 2011	2011 – Wii; 2016 – Wii U Virtual Console	Celebrates the 25th anniversary of The Legend of Zelda with the power of Link to fly with his bird.; Announced at the 2009 Electronic Entertainment Expo.; Prominently features motion controls through the use of the Wii Remote.
The Legend of Zelda: A Link Between Worlds	EU: November 22, 2013; NA: November 22, 2013; AU: November 23, 2013; JP: December 26, 2013	2013 – 3DS	Announced at the 2013 Electronic Entertainment Expo.; Spiritual sequel to The Legend of Zelda: A Link to the Past.
The Legend of Zelda: Tri Force Heroes	JP: October 22, 2015; NA: October 23, 2015; EU: October 23, 2015; AU: October 24, 2015	2015 – 3DS	Focus on multiplayer gameplay.; Developed by Grezzo.
The Legend of Zelda: Breath of the Wild	NA: March 3, 2017; EU: March 3, 2017; AU: March 3, 2017; JP: March 3, 2017	2017 – Wii U 2017 – Switch	Nintendo Switch launch game.
The Legend of Zelda: Tears of the Kingdom	NA: May 12, 2023; EU: May 12, 2023; AU: May 12, 2023; JP: May 12, 2023	2023 – Switch	Sequel to Breath of the Wild.
The Legend of Zelda: Echoes of Wisdom	EU: September 26, 2024; NA: September 26, 2024; JP: September 26, 2024; AU: September 26, 2024	2024 – Switch	Developed by Grezzo.

==== Remakes and remasters ====
Title	Release	Release by system	Notes
The Legend of Zelda: Link's Awakening DX	JP: December 12, 1998; NA: December 15, 1998; PAL: January 1, 1999	1998 – Game Boy Color; 2023 – Nintendo Classics	Color version of The Legend of Zelda: Link's Awakening.; Includes a new dungeon and new items.
The Legend of Zelda: Ocarina of Time Master Quest	JP: November 28, 2002; NA: February 28, 2003; PAL: May 3, 2003	2002 – GameCube	Modified version of The Legend of Zelda: Ocarina of Time featuring new puzzles in the dungeons.; Included as a limited pre-order bonus with The Wind Waker in Japan and North America; included in the first boxes of The Wind Waker in the PAL-region.; Began as an expansion to Ocarina of Time for the Nintendo 64DD under the working title Ura Zelda.
The Legend of Zelda: Ocarina of Time 3D	JP: June 16, 2011; PAL: June 17, 2011; NA: June 19, 2011	2011 – 3DS	Remake / enhanced port of The Legend of Zelda: Ocarina of Time featuring updated graphics and gameplay features.; Includes content from Master Quest.; Developed by Grezzo.
The Legend of Zelda: Four Swords Anniversary Edition	WW: September 28, 2011	2011 – DSiWare	Remake of the Four Swords game from The Legend of Zelda: A Link to the Past & Four Swords featuring new dungeons based on classic Zelda games, optional singleplayer gameplay, and wireless multiplayer.; Developed by Grezzo.
The Legend of Zelda: The Wind Waker HD	JP: September 26, 2013; NA: October 4, 2013; EU: October 4, 2013	2013 – Wii U	Remaster / enhanced port of The Legend of Zelda: The Wind Waker featuring updated graphics and gameplay features.
The Legend of Zelda: Majora's Mask 3D	NA: February 13, 2015; EU: February 13, 2015; JP: February 14, 2015; AU: February 14, 2015	2015 – 3DS	Remake / enhanced port of The Legend of Zelda: Majora's Mask featuring updated graphics and gameplay features.; Developed by Grezzo.
The Legend of Zelda: Twilight Princess HD	NA: March 4, 2016; EU: March 4, 2016; JP: March 10, 2016	2016 – Wii U	Celebrates the 30th anniversary of The Legend of Zelda with the power of Link to turn into a wolf again.; Also celebrates the 10th anniversary of The Legend of Zelda: Twilight Princess.; Remaster / enhanced port of The Legend of Zelda: Twilight Princess featuring updated graphics and gameplay features.; Developed by Tantalus Media.
The Legend of Zelda: Link's Awakening	WW: September 20, 2019	2019 – Switch	Remake of The Legend of Zelda: Link's Awakening featuring updated graphics and gameplay features.; Developed by Grezzo.; New art style and soundtrack.
The Legend of Zelda: Skyward Sword HD	WW: July 16, 2021	2021 – Switch	Remaster / enhanced port of The Legend of Zelda: Skyward Sword featuring updated graphics and a new control scheme.; Developed by Tantalus Media.
The Legend of Zelda: Breath of the Wild – Nintendo Switch 2 Edition	WW: June 5, 2025	2025 – Switch 2	Enhanced port of Breath of the Wild.; Nintendo Switch 2 launch game.
The Legend of Zelda: Tears of the Kingdom – Nintendo Switch 2 Edition	WW: June 5, 2025	2025 – Switch 2	Enhanced port of Tears of the Kingdom.; Nintendo Switch 2 launch game.
The Legend of Zelda: Ocarina of Time	WW: November 5, 2026	2026 – Switch 2	Remake of The Legend of Zelda: Ocarina of Time with updated graphics.

==== Collections ====
Title	Release	System	Ports
The Legend of Zelda: Collector's Edition	PAL: November 14, 2003; NA: November 17, 2003; JP: March 18, 2004	GameCube	Limited release video game compilation.; The Legend of Zelda; Zelda II: The Adventure of Link; The Legend of Zelda: Ocarina of Time; The Legend of Zelda: Majora's Mask; The Legend of Zelda: The Wind Waker demo

=== Spin-offs ===
Title	Release	Release by system	Notes
Zelda	NA: August 1989	1989 – Game & Watch; 1998 – Mini Classic	Based on the original The Legend of Zelda for the Nintendo Entertainment System.; The final Game & Watch handheld released.; Included in the Game Boy Advance compilation title Game & Watch Gallery 4.
The Legend of Zelda	NA: October 5, 1989; PAL: December 1992	1989 – Nelsonic game watch	Developed by Nelsonic Industries.; Based on the original The Legend of Zelda for Nintendo Entertainment System.; Features a quartz accurate digital clock and a resettable alarm.
Zelda no Densetsu: Kamigami no Triforce	JP: 1992	1992 – Barcode Battler II	Developed by Epoch Co.; Based on the original The Legend of Zelda: A Link to the Past for Super Nintendo Entertainment System.
Link: The Faces of Evil	NA: October 10, 1993; PAL: October 10, 1993	1993 – Philips CD-i	Developed by Animation Magic.; Side-scrolling game.; Nintendo licensed its characters for Philips' game console.
Zelda: The Wand of Gamelon	NA: October 10, 1993; PAL: October 10, 1993	1993 – Philips CD-i	Developed by Animation Magic.; Side-scrolling game.; Nintendo licensed its characters for Philips' game console.
Zelda's Adventure	NA: June 5, 1994; PAL: January 1, 1995	1994 – Philips CD-i	Developed by Viridis.; Main character is Zelda rather than Link.; Nintendo licensed its characters for Philips' game console.
BS Zelda no Densetsu	JP: August 6, 1995 (MAP1); JP: December 30, 1995 (MAP2)	1995 – Satellaview	Used the Satellaview peripheral to introduce new elements at specified times.; Re-broadcast in January 1997 as a Player's Choice Classic SoundLink game. (Note: Japanese: あなたが選ぶ名作サウンドリンクゲーム, Hepburn: Anataga Erabu Meisaku SoundLink Game)
BS Zelda no Densetsu Inishie no Sekiban	JP: March 30, 1997	1997 – Satellaview	Used the Satellaview peripheral to introduce new elements at specified times.
Freshly-Picked Tingle's Rosy Rupeeland	JP: September 2, 2006; PAL: September 14, 2007	2006 – DS	Role-playing game featuring Tingle as the main character.
Tingle's Balloon Fight DS	JP: April 12, 2007	2007 – DS	Remake of Balloon Fight featuring Tingle as the main character.; Released through Nintendo's Japanese Club Nintendo service.
Link's Crossbow Training	NA: November 19, 2007; PAL: December 7, 2007; AU: December 13, 2007; JP: May 1, 2008	2007 – Wii	Bundled with the Wii Zapper.; Shares setting with The Legend of Zelda: Twilight Princess.; The second game in the series to receive a T rating.; Known in Japan as Rinku no Bougan Torēningu purasu Wī Zappā. (Note: Japanese: リンクのボウガントレーニング+Wiiザッパー; lit. Link Bowgun Training plus Wii Zapper)
Dekisugi Tingle Pack	JP: June 24, 2009	2009 – DSiWare	Contains five Tingle-themed tools: fortune teller, timer, calculator, music program, and coin game.
Irozuki Tingle no Koi no Balloon Trip	JP: August 6, 2009	2009 – DS	Sequel to the 2006 title Freshly-Picked Tingle's Rosy Rupeeland.
Hyrule Warriors	JP: August 14, 2014; EU: September 19, 2014; AU: September 20, 2014; NA: September 26, 2014	2014 – Wii U 2016 – 3DS; 2018 – Switch	A collaboration between Tecmo Koei and Nintendo, and contains elements of Zelda and Tecmo Koei's Dynasty Warriors series.
My Nintendo Picross: The Legend of Zelda: Twilight Princess	JP: March 17, 2016; EU: March 31, 2016; AU: March 31, 2016; NA: March 31, 2016	2016 – 3DS	Nonogram puzzle game.; Developed by Picross series developers Jupiter.; Only available through the My Nintendo loyalty program.; Inspired by The Legend of Zelda: Twilight Princess HD.
Cadence of Hyrule: Crypt of the NecroDancer featuring The Legend of Zelda	June 13, 2019	2019 – Switch	An indie rhythm roguelike game.; Developed by Brace Yourself Games.; A crossover title of Crypt of the NecroDancer and The Legend of Zelda.
Hyrule Warriors: Age of Calamity	NA: November 20, 2020; EU: November 20, 2020; AU: November 20, 2020; JP: November 20, 2020; MEX: 2021	2020 – Switch	A collaboration between Tecmo Koei and Nintendo, and contains elements of Zelda and Tecmo Koei's Dynasty Warriors series.; Follow-up to Hyrule Warriors. The plot acts as an alternate version of the time prior to the events of The Legend of Zelda: Breath of the Wild.
Hyrule Warriors: Age of Imprisonment	2025	2025 – Switch 2	Follow-up to Hyrule Warriors: Age of Calamity. Acts as a prequel to The Legend of Zelda: Tears of the Kingdom, detailing the events of when Zelda was sent back in time.

== Other media ==
Title	Release	Medium	Notes
The Legend of Zelda Game	1988	Board game	Released by Milton Bradley.
The Legend of Zelda	1989	2005: DVD	13-episode television cartoon series. Loosely following the first game in the series.; Released by Shout! Factory.
The Legend of Zelda	1990, 1999	Comic books, manga	Valiant Comics began publishing titles under the Nintendo Comics System brand in 1990. The Legend of Zelda comics were based on a combination of the first two video games and the concurrently produced animated series.; Created by Akira Himekawa based on the video games; the first was created in 1999, and the series is being re-released in English by Viz Media.; Shotaro Ishinomori created a manga based on A Link to the Past that was featured in Nintendo Power.; Ataru Cagiva created manga based on the Zelda series.
The Legend of Zelda: Hyrule Historia	JP: December 21, 2011; AU/EU/NA: January 29, 2013	Hardcover book	Zelda timeline.; Hyrule history lore.
Monopoly: The Legend of Zelda	NA: September 15, 2014	Board game	
The Legend of Zelda: Art & Artifacts	JP: August 26, 2016; NA: February 21, 2017	Hardcover book	Contains art from different games.
The Legend of Zelda Encyclopedia	JP: March 1, 2017; NA: June 19, 2018	Hardcover book	Lore from the Zelda world.
The Legend of Zelda: Breath of the Wild - Creating a Champion	JP: December 15, 2017; NA: November 20, 2018	Hardcover book	Lore and concept art from Breath of the Wild.

=== Soundtracks ===
Title	Release	Medium	Notes
Zelda no Densetsu Sound & Drama	JP: June 22, 1994	CD	Remixed soundtrack to The Legend of Zelda: A Link to the Past including an audio drama giving Link's backstory.; 2-disc, 49-track album released by Sony Records.
The Legend of Zelda: Ocarina of Time Original Soundtrack	December 18, 1998	CD	82-track album released by Pony Canyon.
The Legend of Zelda: Ocarina of Time Hyrule Symphony	January 27, 1999	CD	13-track remix album released by Players Planet.; Contains orchestral remixes of songs from previous games.
The Legend of Zelda: Majora's Mask Original Soundtrack	June 23, 2000	CD	112-track double album released by Pioneer LDC.
The Legend of Zelda: Majora's Mask Orchestrations	October 21, 2000	CD	11-track remix album released by Enterbrain.
The Legend of Zelda: The Wind Waker Original Soundtrack	March 19, 2003	CD	133-track double album released by Scitron Digital Contents
Mario & Zelda Big Band Live	December 10, 2003	CD	Compilation of various tracks from The Legend of Zelda and Mario series.; 18-track album released by Scitron Digital Contents.
Nintendo Sound History Series: Zelda the Music	December 22, 2004	CD	Compilation of various tracks from The Legend of Zelda series.; 70-track album released by Scitron Digital Contents.
The Legend of Zelda: Twilight Princess Official Soundtrack	November 19, 2006	CD	7-track promotional album released by Nintendo Power to promote Twilight Princess.
Irozuki Tingle no Koi no Balloon Trip Special Sound Track	August 6, 2009	CD	121-track 2 disc set included with the Irozuki Tingle no Koi no Balloon Trip Perfect Clear Guide Book released by Enterbrain.
The Legend of Zelda Series for Guitar - Super Best	July 20, 2010	CD	33-track disc included with The Legend of Zelda Series for Guitar - Super Best sheet music book released by Yamaha Music Media.
The Legend of Zelda: Ocarina of Time 3D Original Soundtrack	2011	CD	51-track promotional album released by Club Nintendo in Japan, Europe, North America and Australasia.
The Legend of Zelda: 25th Anniversary Special Orchestration	November 18, 2011	CD	8-track album.; Exclusive with Skyward Sword pre-orders and shortly after release.
The Legend of Zelda: Skyward Sword Piano Arrange CD	November 24, 2011	CD	3-track disc included with The Legend of Zelda: Skyward Sword Fan Book released by Tokyo News Service.
The Legend of Zelda: The Wind Waker HD Sound Selection	2013	CD	50-track promotional album released by Club Nintendo in Japan.
The Legend of Zelda: Majora's Mask Official Soundtrack	2013	CD	112-track promotional double album released by Club Nintendo in North America.
The Legend of Zelda: A Link Between Worlds Sound Selection	2014	CD	105-track promotional double album released by Club Nintendo in Japan and Europe.
The Legend of Zelda: Majora's Mask 3D Original Soundtrack	October 7, 2015	CD	133-track double album released by Tablier Communications.
The Legend of Zelda: Twilight Princess HD Original Soundtrack	July 27, 2016	CD	108-track 3 disc set released by Tablier Communications.
The 30th Anniversary The Legend of Zelda Game Music Collection	September 28, 2016	CD	93-track double album released by Nippon Columbia.
The Legend of Zelda: 30th Anniversary Concert	February 15, 2017	CD	14-track double album released by Nippon Columbia.
Hero of Time	March 27, 2017	CD, vinyl and digital distribution	Orchestral recording of Ocarina of Time's score produced by Sebastian Wolff and Eric Buchholz, and performed by the Slovak National Symphony Orchestra.; Distributed on CD and digitally by Materia Collective and on vinyl by Iam8bit.
The Legend of Zelda: Breath of the Wild Original Soundtrack	April 25, 2018	CD	211-track 5 disc set released by Nippon Columbia.; Limited collector's edition was released, with a Play Button music player containing 15 pre-loaded tracks.
The Legend of Zelda: Concert 2018	March 6, 2019	CD	14-track double album released by Nippon Columbia.
The Legend of Zelda: Link's Awakening Original Soundtrack	March 18, 2020	CD	205-track 4 disc set released by Nippon Columbia.; Discs 1 & 2 feature music from the 2019 Switch remake, while discs 3 & 4 feature music from the 1993 Game Boy original.
Cadence of Hyrule	2020	Vinyl	8-track promotional album released by Nintendo of America.
The Legend of Zelda: Skyward Sword Original Soundtrack	November 23, 2021	CD	187-track 5 disc set released by Nippon Columbia.; A limited collector's edition was released, containing a music box that plays the track "Ballad of the Goddess".
The Legend of Zelda: Tears of the Kingdom Original Soundtrack	July 31, 2024	CD	344-track 9 disc set released by Nippon Columbia.; A limited collector's edition was released, with a Master Sword shaped USB containing 15 high resolution tracks.
Nintendo Music	October 31, 2024 (Note: Available in 45 regions on six continents.)	Music streaming service, subscription-based	Contains hundreds of tracks from 11 Zelda titles including Hyrule Warriors: Age of Imprisonment as of June 2026.
