= The Legend of Zelda: Breath of the Wild – Creating a Champion =

Book by Nintendo

- Front cover of the standard English edition
- Editor: Patrick Thorpe
- Author: Nintendo
- Original title: ゼルダの伝説 ブレス オブ ザ ワイルド:マスターワークス
- Cover artist: Takumi Wada; Cary Grazzini
- Language: Japanese; English
- Series: The Legend of Zelda
- Genre: Video game art
- Published: December 2017 (Japanese); November 2018 (Dark Horse Comics)
- Publisher: Dark Horse Comics
- Publication date: December 15, 2017
- Publication place: United States
- English publication date: November 2018
- Pages: 424
- ISBN: 978-1-5067-1010-5

The Legend of Zelda: Breath of the Wild – Creating a Champion (Note: The Legend of Zelda: Breath of the Wild – Master Works (Japanese: ゼルダの伝説 ブレス オブ ザ ワイルド:マスターワークス)) is a companion video game art book to Nintendo's 2017 video game The Legend of Zelda: Breath of the Wild. It was published in English by Dark Horse Comics on November 20, 2018, and is a localisation of a book titled Master Works that was published by Nintendo in Japan. It presents official illustrations and concept art from the game alongside development notes and also documents the fictional history of Hyrule presented in the game. The book was released as a standard edition with a white cover, a "Hero's Edition" featuring a blue cloth slip case and a "Champion's Edition" collector's box with a leather case.

== Content ==
Creating a Champion comprises 424 pages of content that focus entirely on The Legend of Zelda: Breath of the Wild. The book features 296 pages of concept art alongside notes by the development team. It includes 50 pages of official illustrations by Takumi Wada and features interviews with Satoru Takizawa, Hidemaro Fujibayashi, Wada-san, and Eiji Aonuma. The book also includes a 55-page section devoted to the game's fictional history.

The book reveals concepts and early designs for Breath of the Wild, such as Eiji Aonuma's idea to include Link's motorcycle, the Master Cycle Zero, in the game, which was initially rebuffed but eventually accepted by the team. It shows how each Divine Beast was designed and modelled to represent an identifiable animal. It also presents rough designs for characters and enemies, some of which were not included in the final game, such as "a design for a giant, fortress-like Guardian that was equipped with multiple beam cannons".

Creating a Champion diverges from previous Zelda art books in relation to The Legend of Zelda fictional timeline. This chronology was first revealed in print in an earlier Dark Horse publication titled Hyrule Historia, which sets down where each Zelda game is positioned within the timeline. In Creating a Champion, producer Eiji Aonuma explains why Breath of the Wild's position on the timeline has not been clarified: "We want players to be able to continue having fun imagining this world even after they are finished with the game, so, this time, we decided that we would avoid making clarifications".

== Development ==
Creating a Champion is a localisation of a book titled Master Works, which was published by Nintendo in Japan. The game's assets were documented by Nintendo and the publisher Ambit. Dark Horse was responsible for the translation of Master Works and its localisation for an English-speaking audience.

Dark Horse editor Patrick Thorpe stated that he approached the fictional history section of the book "like an archaeologist", as it all had to be fact-checked for accuracy. He commented: "So I warped all over the map, scouring the most obscure regions of the game to make sure that our text was accurate. I've been a Hyrule historian. This time I was a Hylian anthropologist".

Thorpe said that the regular edition of Creating a Champion was designed with a white cover to represent Hylia, the goddess at the centre of Zelda lore. This was particularly important to Thorpe, as the publication of the book followed three Dark Horse art books that were designed in the colours of the three Golden Goddesses in the Zelda series named Farore, Din and Nayru. He explained that the two special editions were mocked up by Cary Grazzini over a single weekend and were each designed to have a specific focus. The Hero's Edition was created to focus on Link and its cloth cover was designed to represent his tunic. By contrast, the Champion's Edition was created to honour the Champion characters in the game.

== Publication ==
Dark Horse published Creating a Champion as a hardcover companion art book to Breath of the Wild. Prior to publication, the book was announced by Nintendo on Twitter on July 10, 2017. Nintendo also revealed several sample images from the book. Creating a Champion was preceded by the publication of earlier Zelda art books published by Dark Horse, beginning with Hyrule Historia in 2013 and Art & Artifacts.

The standard edition of the book was released alongside a deluxe edition on November 20, 2018. The deluxe "Hero's Edition" was published with a slip case designed with the same blue colour as Link's tunic and includes a map of Hyrule, a glass replica of a spirit orb and a photo illustration of Link and the Champion characters.

A "Champion's Edition" was also released as a collector's box and features a leather case with gold embellishments. The box includes the Creating a Champion art book with gold gilded pages, a Calamity Ganon tapestry, an art print of an illustration of the Champions created by Takumi Wada, six small prints of the characters Zelda, Link, Mipha, Revali, Daruk, and Urbosa, and four orbs that display a laser etching of a Divine Beast symbol. The book was made available as an exclusive release at GameStop.

== Sales ==
Publishers Weekly ranked Creating a Champion in 15th position for hardcover nonfiction in the first week of its release, with over 10,000 units sold.

== Reception ==
Rob Dwiar writing for GamesRadar+ included the book on a list of best video game art books describing it as "a stupendous companion to one of the best games of recent times". Sara Gitkos of iMore included the book on a list of best Legend of Zelda books for 2022. Chris Carter of Destructoid reacted to the lack of clarity with regards to the positioning of Breath of the Wild on The Legend of Zelda fictional timeline. He thought that Nintendo's decision to leave this open to the player's interpretation suggested that it was still undecided and that the timeline was considered by Aonuma to be a mistake. Eurogamer's Tom Phillips described the lack of clarification as a "cop out" but continued that "perhaps it's the best kind of cop out - one which strengthens the game and the discussion around it, rather than restricting fan enjoyment".
