= Bo Bragason =

British actress

- Born: 27 March 2004 (age 22); Chichester, England
- Education: Knutsford Academy; Knutsford Little Theatre; National Youth Theatre; David Johnson Drama
- Occupation: Actress
- Years active: 2007–present
- Height: 173 cm (5 ft 8 in)

Bo Bragason (born 27 March 2004) is a British actress. On television, she is known for her roles in the BBC One series Three Girls (2017), The Jetty (2024) and King & Conqueror (2025), the Disney+ series Renegade Nell (2024), and the Amazon Prime series Sterling Point (2026). She began acting in the 2007 film Hidden Love, performed motion capture for Kingsglaive: Final Fantasy XV (2016), and will star as Princess Zelda in the upcoming film The Legend of Zelda.

Bragason was named a 2026 Screen International Star of Tomorrow.

== Early life and education ==
Bo Bragason was born on 27 March 2004 in Chichester, West Sussex. Her father is Icelandic. She spent seven years of her childhood in Luxembourg and three in the south of France.

Upon returning to England in 2014, her family settled in the village of Mere, Cheshire. Bragason attended Knutsford Academy nearby. She joined the Knutsford Little Theatre and later the National Youth Theatre. She also took Saturday classes at David Johnson Drama in Manchester.

== Career ==
As a toddler, Bragason had a minor role in the 2007 French-language film Hidden Love (French: L'Amour Caché). A decade later, Bragason made her television debut as Rachel Winshaw in the 2017 BBC One miniseries Three Girls. This was followed by appearances in instalments of the anthologies Moving On, also on BBC One, and Creeped Out on CBBC.

Bragason returned to film in Kingsglaive: Final Fantasy XV, wherein she did motion capture performance. She then appeared in Prano Bailey-Bond's 2021 horror film Censor. That same year, Bragason shared the role of Vera with Florence Hunt in the stage adaptation of Force Majeure at Donmar Warehouse.

In 2024, Bragason had main roles as Roxy Trotter in the Disney+ fantasy adventure series Renegade Nell with Louisa Harland and Amy Knightly in the BBC One crime drama The Jetty with Jenna Coleman, and starred as Clara in Euros Lyn's vampire film The Radleys.

Bragason has a role in the BBC One 2025 historical drama King & Conqueror. In July 2025, it was announced that Bragason would star in the lead role of Princess Zelda in Nintendo's live-action film adaptation of The Legend of Zelda opposite Benjamin Evan Ainsworth.

== Filmography ==
Key
†	Denotes films that have not yet been released

=== Film ===
Year	Title	Role	Notes	Ref
2007	Hidden Love	Sophie		
2016	Kingsglaive: Final Fantasy XV	Motion capture for Young Luna		
2021	Censor	Older Girl		
2024	The Radleys	Clara Radley		
2027	The Legend of Zelda †	Princess Zelda	Post-production	

=== Television ===
Year	Title	Role	Notes
2017	Three Girls	Rachel Winshaw	Miniseries
2018	Moving On	Lyn	1 episode
2019	Creeped Out	Rocky	1 episode
2024	Renegade Nell	Roxy Jackson	Main role
2024	The Jetty	Amy Knightly	Main role
2025	King & Conqueror	Queen Gunhild (based on the historical Edith of Wessex)	Main role
2026–present	Sterling Point	Oona	Main role

== Stage ==
- Force Majeure (2021), Vera – Donmar Warehouse, London
