= The Radleys (film) =

2024 British comedy horror film

- Theatrical release poster
- Directed by: Euros Lyn
- Screenplay by: Talitha Stevenson
- Based on: The Radleys by Matt Haig
- Produced by: Debbie Gray
- Starring: Damian Lewis; Kelly Macdonald; Harry Baxendale; Bo Bragason; Jay Lycurgo; Siân Phillips; Shaun Parkes
- Cinematography: Nanu Segal
- Edited by: Jamie Pearson
- Music by: Keefus Ciancia
- Production companies: Genesius Pictures; Ginger Biscuit Entertainment; Ingenious Media
- Distributed by: Sky Cinema
- Release dates: 20 August 2024 (EIFF); 18 October 2024 (United Kingdom)
- Running time: 111 minutes
- Country: United Kingdom
- Language: English

The Radleys is a 2024 British comedy horror film directed by Euros Lyn and written by Talitha Stevenson, based on the 2010 novel by Matt Haig. It stars Damian Lewis, Kelly Macdonald, Harry Baxendale, Bo Bragason, and Jay Lycurgo, Siân Phillips and Shaun Parkes.

The film premiered at the 2024 Edinburgh International Film Festival, and was released in cinemas and on Sky Cinema on 18 October 2024.

== Premise ==
A family of vampires who choose to abstain from drinking blood are confronted with the problem of their teenage children, whose bloodlust proves difficult to control. When their identity is exposed, parents Helen and Peter are forced to confront who they are, with the help or hindrance of Peter's twin brother Will, who is a practising vampire.

== Cast ==
- Damian Lewis as Peter Radley and Will Radley
- Kelly Macdonald as Helen Radley
- Harry Baxendale as Rowan Radley
- Bo Bragason as Clara Radley
- Jay Lycurgo as Evan Copleigh
- Shaun Parkes as Jared Copleigh
- Sophia Di Martino as Lorna Felt
- Steven Waddington as Mark Felt
- Madeleine Power as Tilly
- Siân Phillips
- Leon Cole as Teenager (uncredited)

== Production ==
=== Development ===
In October 2022, it was reported that Damian Lewis would star in a film adaptation of Matt Haig's novel The Radleys, directed by Euros Lyn, based on a script by Jo Brand, and written by Talitha Stevenson. Debbie Gray produced and Lewis executive produced via his production company Ginger Biscuit Entertainment. Genesius Productions are producing and Cornerstone Films handling worldwide sales.

=== Casting ===
In June 2023, Kelly Macdonald, Sophia Di Martino, Shaun Parkes, Harry Baxendale and Bo Bragason were added to the cast.

=== Filming ===
Principal photography was initially scheduled for May 2023. Production began in London in June 2023. Filming locations also include Yorkshire.

== Release ==
The film had its world premiere at the Edinburgh International Film Festival on 20 August 2024. The film was released in cinemas and via Sky Cinema on 18 October 2024.

== Reception ==
On the review aggregator website Rotten Tomatoes, The Radleys holds an approval rating of 69% based on 16 reviews, with an average rating of 6.3/10.
