= The Radleys =

Paranormal fantasy novel by Matt Haig

- First edition
- Author: Matt Haig
- Language: English
- Publisher: Canongate Books
- Publication date: 4 October 2010

The Radleys is a paranormal fantasy novel for young adults by Matt Haig, published 1 July 2010 by Canongate Books.

== Reception ==
The Radleys received a starred review from Publishers Weekly, as well as positive reviews from the Associated Press, The Guardian, Library Journal, Parade, Entertainment Weekly, USA Today, The New York Times, Newsday, The Dallas Morning News, and Pittsburgh Tribune-Review. In January 2011, book landed on IndieBound's January 2011 Indie Next List and received an Alex Award from the American Library Association.

A film adaptation started filming in London in 2023 with Damian Lewis playing twin roles and was released in October 2024.
