= Knutsford Academy =

Location
- Bexton Road; Knutsford, Cheshire, WA16 0EA; England; 53.30096°N 2.38129°W

Information
- Type: Academy
- Local authority: Cheshire East
- Specialist: Performing Arts
- Department for Education URN: 138002 Tables
- Ofsted: Reports
- Head teacher: Karen Key
- Gender: Coeducational
- Age: 11 to 18
- Website: http://www.knutsfordacademy.org.uk

Knutsford Academy, formerly known as Knutsford High School, is a secondary school in Knutsford, Cheshire, England. It has Specialist School Status in the areas of Performing Arts. As of 2014, it also includes a Studio school site.

== History ==
The upper school on Bexton Rd was opened as a secondary modern school for boys and girls on 13 November 1953. The lower school on Westfield Drive was built as a separate school for girls and opened on 26 April 1966. In 1973 the two schools combined to form one comprehensive co-educational establishment known as Knutsford County High School. Over 2011–12, work was being performed on the lower site to remove asbestos that was built into the walls.

Knutsford High School became Knutsford Academy on 1 April 2012 after gaining Academy status. This brought with it a complete uniform change. Instead of the previous Blue polo shirt and jumper, the current uniform consists of a blue blazer, embroidered with the Academy Logo, with a striped tie.

The school has a full traditional sixth-form facility, running alongside or as an alternative to the Studio.

== Buildings ==
There are two main sites to the school, lower and upper school. The Upper Site also has the new Studio School building. Between the two sites there is a public walkway known as the link path. Students in year 7 are taught in the lower school building. At year 9 the students begin at upper school. Lower school was once known as middle school as it was considered the middle stage of education back when students were expected to find work after their final year at the school - upper school being the last stage of education. The upper school building is joined to the Knutsford Leisure Centre providing sporting facilities for the P.E department. Outside both buildings are fields with multiple football pitches and multiple tennis courts and a three-pitch astroturf pitch.

As of 2014, the Upper Site features a "Studio School", headed by Nicola Hall, who was brought in especially for the job. George Osborne, member of Parliament for Tatton, was there to officially start the construction of the new site. The site was opened officially on 22 January 2015 by George Osborne.

== Technology ==
Knutsford Academy offers technology available for CAD (Computer Aided Design), Computer Graphics and physical construction design, with hardware including over 100 individual Apple macs. Those available to all upper students and most teachers have white mac books (most running OSX Tiger or Windows XP) or Notebooks. These were replaced 2013–14 with Toshiba Laptops. For students, there are over two hundred general use ICT computers across both sites. Most computers are able to use industry-standard software, such as Adobe Creative Suite 6, or CS6. In 2014, Microsoft Office 365 was in the process of starting to replace the existing Office 2013 software. The school also has laser cutters for cutting out CAD work and numerous other woodworking devices.

== Notable students ==
- Bo Bragason - actress
- Danielle Hope - actress and singer
- Aaron Wilbraham - Bristol City Footballer.
- Phil Jagielka - Derby County and former England Footballer
- Sam Cosgrove - Aberdeen Footballer.
- Tom Walker (singer) - singer-songwriter.
