= The Legend of Zelda =

Video game series

- Logo since 1991
- Genre: Action-adventure
- Developers: Nintendo EAD (1986–2013); Capcom (2001–2004); Flagship (2001–2004); Grezzo (2011–present); Monolith Soft (2011–present); Team Ninja (2014-2020); Omega Force (2014-2020); Nintendo EPD (2015–present); Tantalus Media (2016–2021)
- Publisher: Nintendo
- Creators: Shigeru Miyamoto; Takashi Tezuka
- Producer: Eiji Aonuma
- Artist: Takaya Imamura
- Writer: Kensuke Tanabe
- Composer: Koji Kondo
- Platforms: Famicom Disk System; Nintendo Entertainment System; Super Nintendo Entertainment System; Game Boy; Nintendo 64; Game Boy Color; Game Boy Advance; GameCube; Wii; Nintendo DS; Nintendo 3DS; Wii U; Nintendo Switch; Nintendo Switch 2
- First release: The Legend of Zelda; February 21, 1986
- Latest release: The Legend of Zelda: Ocarina of Time; November 5, 2026
- Spin-offs: List of spin-offs

The Legend of Zelda (Note: Japanese: ゼルダの伝説, Hepburn: Zeruda no Densetsu; usually romanized as Zelda no Densetsu) is a video game series created by Japanese game designers Shigeru Miyamoto and Takashi Tezuka. It is primarily developed and published by Nintendo, but some installments and re-releases have been outsourced to Flagship, Grezzo, and Tantalus Media.

The series centers on the various incarnations of Link, a courageous young boy of the elf-like Hylian race, and Princess Zelda, a princess within the bloodline of the goddess Hylia. They fight to save the land of Hyrule from Ganon, an evil warlord turned demon king who wishes to use the Triforce, a sacred relic that can grant any wish its user desires when complete, to remake the world in his own dark image. Zelda's role has often been that of a damsel in distress or donor who assists Link. If someone with a heart that does not possess a balance of Power, Courage, and Wisdom attempts to touch the Triforce, it will split into three triangles and bond with three people whose hearts embody the required virtue. While the conflict with Ganon serves as a backbone for the series, some games have featured other settings and antagonists, with Link traveling or being sent to these other lands in their time of need.

Since The Legend of Zelda was released in 1986, the series has expanded to include 21 entries on all of Nintendo's major game consoles, as well as a number of spin-offs. An American animated TV series based on the games aired in 1989 and manga adaptations commissioned by Nintendo have been produced in Japan since 1997. The Legend of Zelda is one of the best-selling video game franchises of all time, having sold over 150 million copies as of September 2024. The series is also known for its high level of quality, with many of its entries considered among the greatest video games of all time.

== Gameplay ==
Rupees, the fictional currency in the series

Gameplay of The Legend of Zelda games feature a mix of puzzles, action-adventure, and exploration. These elements used to be constant (Note: Attributed to multiple sources since Breath of the Wild began development in 2011: Eiji Aonuma, 2013: "Our mission in developing this new game for Wii U is quite plainly to rethink the conventions of Zelda. I'm referring to things such as the player is supposed to complete dungeons in a certain order. That you are supposed to play by yourself. We want to set aside these 'conventions', get back to basics to create a newborn Zelda so players today can enjoy the real essence of the franchise."; Eurogamer, 2016: "[Until Breath of the Wild, i]t's hard to think of many entries since [the original The Legend of Zelda] which have refreshed the series so completely, and with so much style."; GamesRadar+, 2017: "Well, Breath of the Wild doesn't want to play by the rules. The rulebook isn't just torn up. It's crushed beneath boulders, burned in a forest inferno and struck by lightning. Science has arrived in Hyrule, a rush of freeform simulation that brings with it a spark of life that could never quite ignite in the hand-crafted worlds of old... As a long-term fan, it's a treat to see Nintendo take its gift for problem solving outside of the Zelda comfort zone - a place the series has arguably inhabited since Ocarina of Time. Not since that game's leap to 3D and introduction of lock-on targeting has a Zelda game made this many breakthroughs."; Hidemaro Fujibayashi, 2017: "[W]e chose March 3, 2017 as the release date [of Breath of the Wild] because we wanted more time to make the game as interesting as possible. We were thinking about breaking the conventions of the Zelda series from the very start of development. Specifically, our process was to think of all kinds of different mechanics, and to try to distinguish between the unchanging, universal traits of the Zelda franchise and things that had simply become conventions of the series."; The Guardian, 2017: "The greens of the open plains contrast with the dark black of Death Mountain, which is streaked with orange lava on the distant horizon. As the sweeping orchestral soundtrack swells, you realise that you can go anywhere and that this is not like any Zelda you've played before. Released on Wii U and Switch in March, The Legend of Zelda: Breath of the Wild (BotW) is the biggest Zelda title ever made. One-and-a-half times the size of open-world trailblazer Skyrim and 12 times the size of Twilight Princess, it provides a vast terrain to explore with barely any restrictions beyond a few hours of subtly enclosed preparation."; GameSpot, 2023: "[Tears of the Kingdom] builds upon the foundation so thoroughly and transformationally that it feels like a revelation. This is The Legend of Zelda at its finest, borrowing the best pieces and qualities from across the franchise's history and creating something new that is emotionally resonant, captivating, and endlessly rewarding... Breath of the Wild upended the Zelda formula by presenting a vast and lush open world to explore--a reenvisioning of the unguided experience of the original Legend of Zelda for the Nintendo Entertainment System... These tools, and the sprawling world they inhabit, give Tears of the Kingdom a particular flow that feels unique to the Zelda franchise. You aren't simply solving puzzles or fighting battles--you're engineering solutions.") throughout the series, with small refinements and additions in each new game. Some installments include stealth gameplay, where the player must avoid enemies while proceeding through a level, as well as mini games, such as racing. Depending on the game, players control Link or Princess Zelda from a fixed top-down perspective, (Note: Top-down games in the series have been released with both 2D and fixed 3D computer graphics.) or in a 3D game world with a free-roaming camera.

Zelda games can be beaten with a minimal amount of exploration and side quests, but the player is frequently rewarded with helpful items or increased abilities for solving puzzles or exploring hidden areas. Some items are consistent and appear many times throughout the series, while others are unique to a single game. Staples of the series include bombs that can both act as weapons and open blocked or hidden doorways; boomerangs, which can kill or paralyze enemies; keys for locked doors; shields; bows and arrows; light sources; magical rods, hammers, musical instruments; digging tools; and a grappling hook-like device named the hookshot. Items can be bought, rented, or found as a puzzle-solving reward, depending on the game. (Note: Attributed to multiple sources: Famous equippable Zelda series items; Finding recurring items by solving puzzles in dungeons; Renting or buying recurring items) In 2017's Breath of the Wild and its 2023 sequel, Tears of the Kingdom, swords and other weapons originally found in dungeons or purchased from shops are now found in the game world and stolen from defeated enemies. Items are generally used through by swapping out to one or more selected button prompts through a menu, while the sword is usually fixed. Echoes copied by Zelda in 2024's Echoes of Wisdom also attack or clear paths with bombs. Early in certain Zelda games, swords are given to Link or found in a secluded area. More powerful swords, or special sword abilities, can be discovered by Link or taught to him in the games. Existing weapons can also receive upgrades.

The motion controls of 2011's Skyward Sword, using either the Wii's Wii MotionPlus or the Nintendo Switch's Joy-Con, simulate sword fighting by swinging the controller in specific directions to attack enemies, or counter an enemy's attempt to block. Breath of the Wild introduced a physics engine—allowing for physics-based solutions such as crushing an enemy via rolling a boulder onto it—and what was called a chemistry engine, a rule-based state calculator in which various elements (fire, water, wind, etc.) interact with other objects and elements in different ways. (Note: Technical director Takuhiro Dohta explained that wind and electricity are not elements in a textbook, but they are in Breath of the Wild for the sake of how the chemistry engine is built.) Echoes of Wisdom is also a departure from other games' style of combat, as the playable Zelda is primarily unable to directly hit enemies on her own. (Note: With the exception of a swordfighter form that requires charging after a short period of combat.) Instead, she uses an item called the Tri Rod to create echoes via coping objects and enemies and recreating them to solve puzzles and defeat enemies, even if the object or enemy in question is not in the area or region her current situation is. Another physics-based technique in late 2010s and 2020s Zelda titles involves using certain abilities to allow Link or Zelda to remotely move or drop objects on top of enemies, drop enemies down holes, or propel themselves across gaps. (Note: Attributed to multiple sources: Link using the abilities; Zelda using the abilities; Dropping objects on enemies; Dropping enemies down pits; Remotely manipulating objects; Propelling the player character with Stasis or Reverse Bond)

Although the games contain role-playing elements (Zelda II: The Adventure of Link is the only one to include an experience system), they emphasize straightforward hack-and-slash-style combat. This has led to much debate over whether or not Zelda games should be classified as action RPGs, a genre on which the series has had a strong influence. In 1992, series co-creator Shigeru Miyamoto disagreed with the label, classifying Zelda as "a real-time adventure game". He said that he was "not interested in systems where everything in the game is decided by stats and numbers" but wanted "to preserve as much of that 'live' feeling as possible", and felt that action games are better suited to convey to players. In 2012, Dark Souls director Hidetaka Miyazaki listed A Link to the Past as one of his top RPGs, alongside video games such as Dragon Quest III, Wizardry, and The Elder Scrolls IV: Oblivion, and the collectable card game, Magic: The Gathering.

The games pioneered a number of features that were to become industry standards. Released on the Famicom Disk System and NES in 1986 and 1987, the original Legend of Zelda was the first console game with a save function that enabled players to stop playing and then resume later. In 1998, Ocarina of Time introduced a targeting system that let the player lock the camera on to enemy or friendly non-player characters which simplified 3D combat.

=== Overworld and dungeons ===
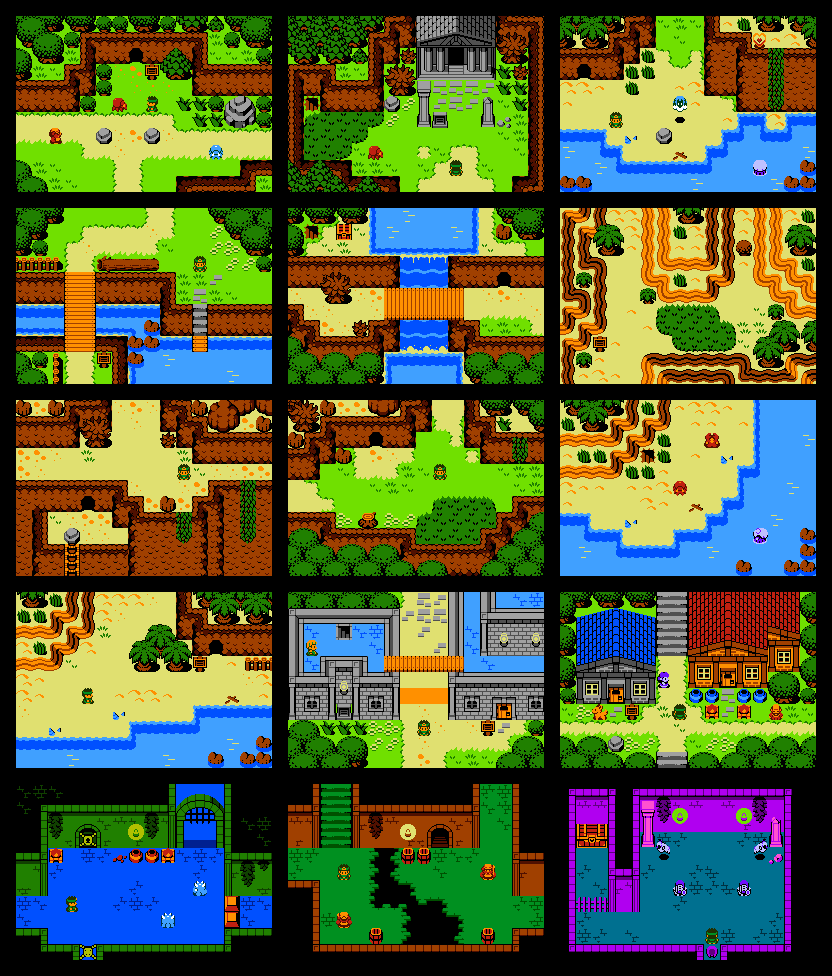
The Legend of Zelda often includes nonlinear gameplay and varying environments in an explorable world, similar to this illustration.

Many mainline Zelda game consist of three key areas: an overworld which connects all other areas and allows multidirectional movement, giving players some degree of freedom; areas of interaction with other characters (like caves, towns, or hidden rooms) in which the player can purchase equipment, gain special items or advice, or complete side quests; and dungeons (or temples, towers, etc.), labyrinthine areas found underground (with some exceptions), comprising a wide range of difficult enemies, bosses, and items. Each usually has one major item that can be essential for solving its puzzles and often plays a crucial role in defeating its boss or progressing through the game. In 2013, A Link Between Worlds introduced a more open-ended progression system by allowing Link to rent items to reach and beat the last seven dungeons. Following this, every main dungeon in Breath of the Wild and Tears of the Kingdom can be accessed in any order before reaching the final boss in their open world setting. Neither game has items hidden inside dungeons for progression, but the latter involves the help of specific companions to solve tasks in their respective Temples.

Navigating a dungeon is usually aided by locating a map, which reveals its layout, and a magic compass, which reveals the location of significant and smaller items such as keys and equipment. In games released after the NES, dungeons include a special "big key" or "boss key" that unlocks the door to fight its boss. In place of a big key, Breath of the Wild has Link use his Sheikah Slate to activate all the control terminals inside the dungeon before its boss attacks him, and Tears of the Kingdom has companions reach and interact with the locations of multiple locks in the relevant Temple to open the door to the boss. The original Zelda on the NES had its dungeons known as "the underworld" in contrast to the overworld, but later games had broad sections located underground or behind rifts that were not dungeons in of themselves, but connected to the overworld or other dungeons, such as Subrosia in 2001's Oracle of Seasons, the Depths in Tears of the Kingdom, and the Still World in Echoes of Wisdom. Some games, like Four Swords, Four Swords Adventures and Tri Force Heroes, have no broadly-connecting overworld, and use randomly picked levels, a linear progression of numbered levels, or a hub world like Hytopia Castle Town.

=== Sailing and gliding ===
While a raft first appeared in the first game, they had limited use and can only be boarded from a dock. Sailing is—by design—the only way to traverse the island-dotted overworlds of The Wind Waker in 2002 and Phantom Hourglass in 2007. By Breath of the Wild, rafts' sails could be propelled by wind using the chemistry engine, and logs could also be used as makeshift boats. The introduction of Ultrahand and Zonai machine parts in Tears of the Kingdom gave players the ability to build a raft or a flying machine out of parts. While gliding had previously been used for puzzles and minigames with the guidance of chickens known as Cuccos, and an item to help scale cliff faces appeared in 2004's The Minish Cap, Breath of the Wild and Tears of the Kingdom use both elements more prominently. In the games' open world, climbing walls and gliding off them on a paraglider makes it possible for the player to plot out multiple routes; in contrast to the way some players had been "glitching" up mountains players while controlling Geralt in The Witcher series (Note: Players controlled Geralt in the first three installments of the series and their downloadable content, released from 2007 to 2016.) and Dovahkiin in The Elder Scrolls V: Skyrim (2011), here it is not considered unintentional climbing. Instead of mountains being impassable walls they are fully climbable for the players by design. Tears of the Kingdom also allows Link to be launched into the sky and travel further with either Zonai machines or gliding. The Reverse Bond ability in Echoes of Wisdom also has Zelda attach herself to a climbing spider or flying bird monster to progress through the game world.

=== Health and fairies ===
In most Zelda games, the player's HP or life meter is represented by a line of hearts. The player usually starts with three hearts; their max health can be increased by finding heart-shaped crystals called heart containers. Full heart containers are usually received at the end of dungeons and dropped by dungeon bosses. Smaller "Pieces of Heart" are awarded for completing side quests or found hidden throughout the game world, and require a certain number (commonly four) to form a full heart container. Health can be replenished by picking up hearts left by defeated enemies or destroyed objects, consuming items such as potions or food, or going to a Great Fairy Fountain to have the Great Fairy heal Link completely. Breath of the Wild and Tears of the Kingdom broke from this tradition, and had Link hunt and cook his food or find potion ingredients in cut grass rather than freely be given hearts to pick up. Occasionally, the player will find fairies hidden in specific locations; they can either heal Link immediately or be kept in empty bottles, and will revive him the next time he dies.

== Conception and production ==
=== Inspiration ===
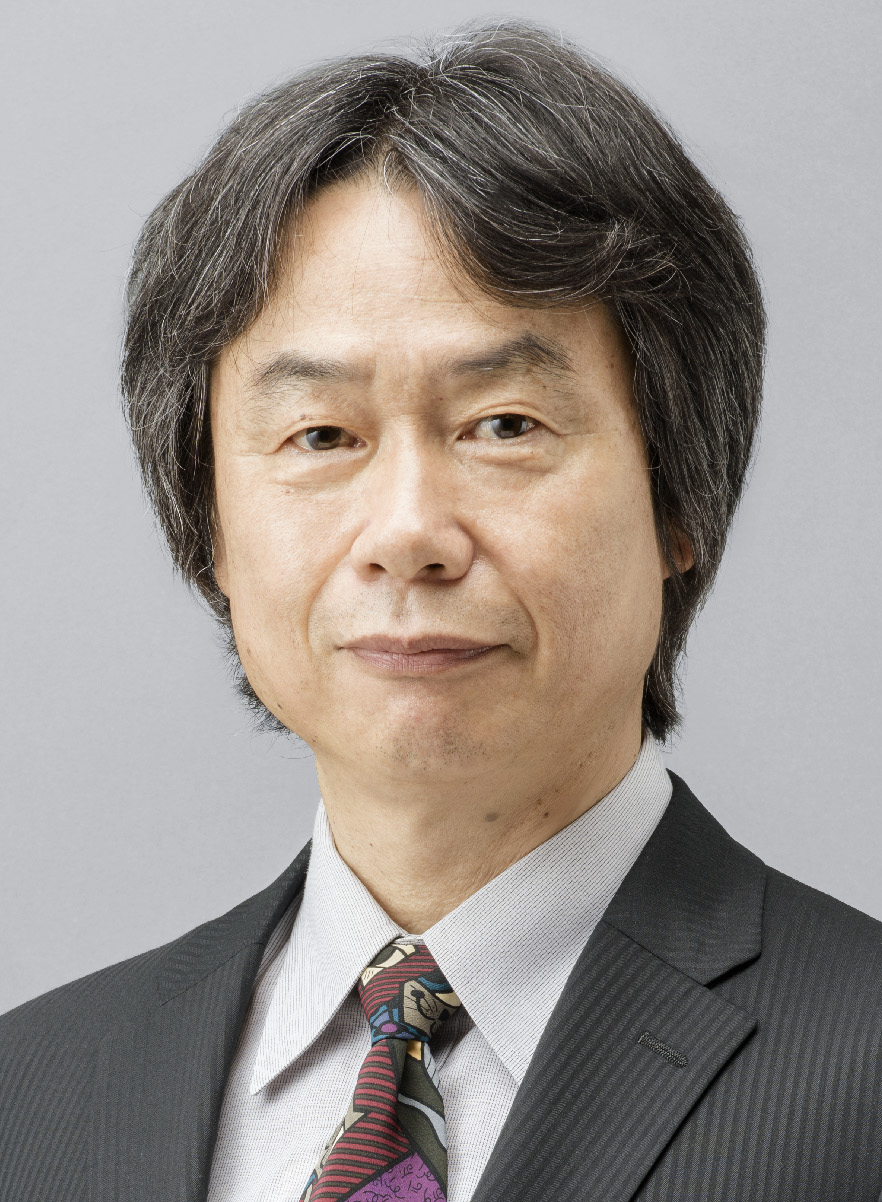
Shigeru Miyamoto, the series creator, was inspired by his adventures in forests and caves as a child.

The Legend of Zelda was principally inspired by Shigeru Miyamoto's "explorations" as a young boy in the hillsides and forests surrounding his childhood home in Sonobe, Japan. According to Miyamoto, one of his most memorable experiences was finding a cave entrance in the middle of the woods. After some hesitation, he entered the cave and explored its depths with the aid of a lantern. Miyamoto has referred to the creation of the Zelda games as an attempt to bring to life a "miniature garden" for players to play with in each game of the series.

The story and setting were developed by Takashi Tezuka. Seeking to create a fairytale adventure game, Tezuka drew inspirations from fantasy books such as J. R. R. Tolkien's The Lord of the Rings. According to Keiji Terui, who wrote the backstory in the first game's manual, the location named Death Mountain was initially a working title for the legend of the Triforce which was written with inspirations from the battles of medieval Europe. The Master Sword was introduced as Excalibur in the French version of A Link to the Past, which is regarded as reminiscent to the legend of King Arthur. Link's steed, was named after Epona, Celtic goddess of fertility.

Princess Zelda was named after American novelist, socialite and painter Zelda Fitzgerald, as Miyamoto thought the name sounded "pleasant and significant". Tezuka modeled Link's appearance after the eponymous character of Walt Disney's Peter Pan (1953). When the series made the transition to 3D, the combat system of Ocarina of Time was based on the chanbara (samurai) style of Japanese sword fighting.

=== Audio ===
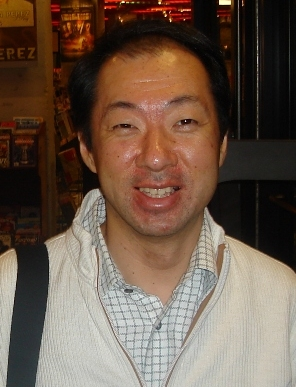
Koji Kondo, the series's original composer

Games in The Legend of Zelda series frequently feature in-game musical instruments, particularly in musical puzzles, which are widespread. Often, instruments trigger game events: for example, the recorder in The Legend of Zelda can reveal secret areas, as well as warp Link to the dungeon entrances. This warping with music feature has also been used in A Link to the Past and Link's Awakening. In Ocarina of Time, playing instruments is a core part of the game, with the player needing to play the instrument through the use of the game controller to succeed. Ocarina of Time is "[one of the] first contemporary non-dance title[s] to feature music-making as part of its gameplay", using music as a heuristic device and requiring the player to utilise songs to progress in the game – a game mechanic that is also present in Majora's Mask.

"The Legend of Zelda Theme" is a recurring piece of music that was created for the first game. The composer and sound director of the series, Koji Kondo, initially planned to use Maurice Ravel's Boléro as the game's title theme, but was forced to change it after learning the orchestral piece had not yet entered the public domain late in production. As a result, Kondo wrote a new arrangement of the overworld theme within one day.

Up until Breath of the Wild, the Legend of Zelda series avoided using voice acting in speaking roles, relying instead on written dialogue. Series producer Eiji Aonuma previously stated that having the other characters speak while Link remains silent "would be off-putting".

== Plot ==
=== Setting ===
Maps of Hyrule

Map of Hyrule, as seen in Ocarina of Time

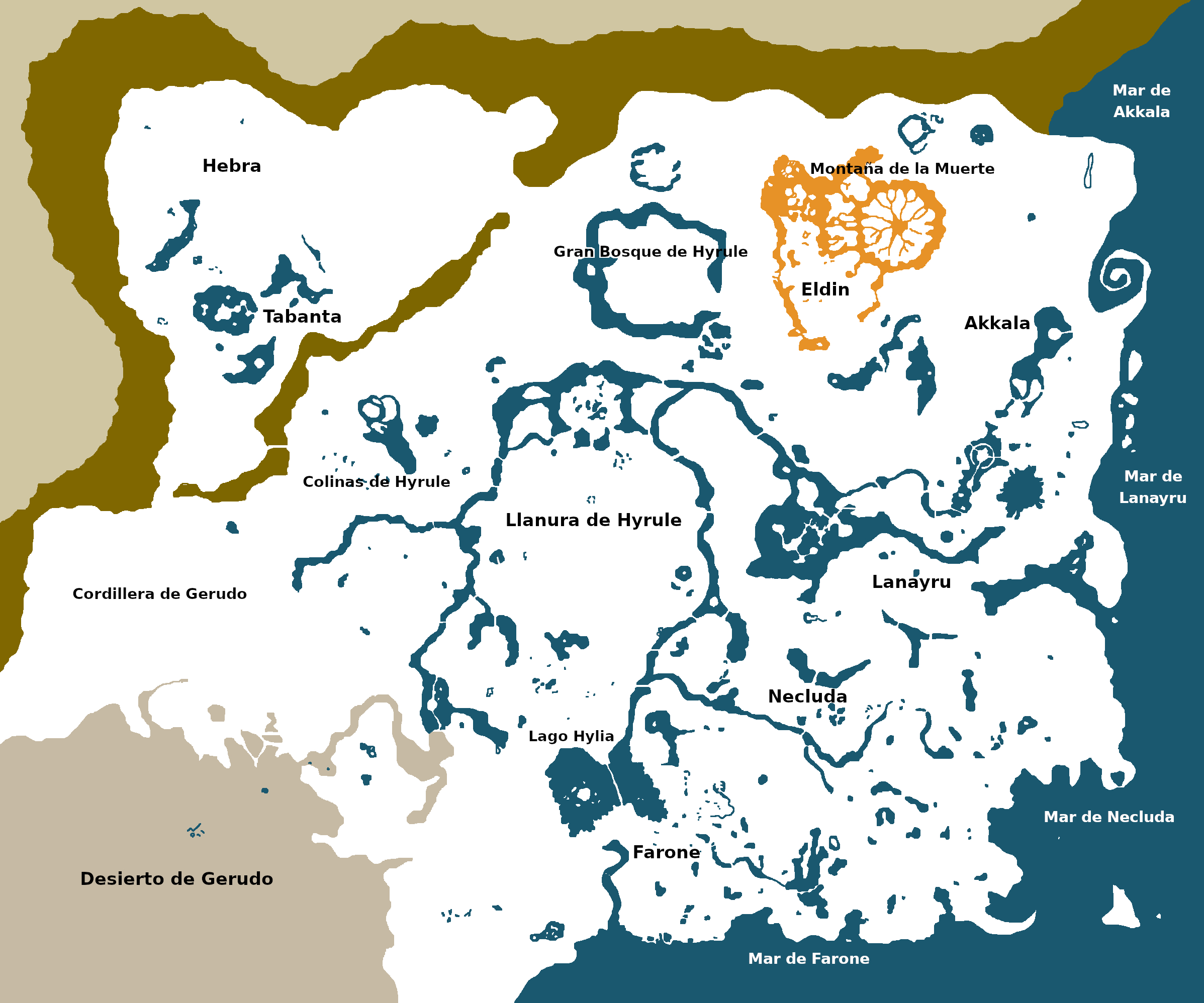
Map of Hyrule, as seen in Breath of the Wild (legend in Spanish)

The Legend of Zelda takes place predominantly in a medieval Western Europe-inspired fantasy world called Hyrule, which has developed a deep history and wide geography over the series's many releases. Hyrule's principal inhabitants are pointy-eared, elf-like humanoids called Hylians, which include the protagonists Link and Zelda. (Note: Satoru Takizawa, the art director of Twilight Princess, Breath of the Wild, and Tears of the Kingdom, described Zelda as the heroine.) Other humanoid populations usually featured in the series are the Sheikah, a secret society serving the goddess Hylia with ties to the royal family, and the Gerudo, a race of mostly female desert-dwelling warriors. Non-human races also appear regularly in the series such as the Zoras, water dwellers with fish-like features and the Gorons, mountain dwellers made of rock.

The fictional universe established by the Zelda games sets the stage for each adventure. Some games take place in different lands with their own back-stories. Labrynna (from Oracle of Ages), Holodrum (from Oracle of Seasons), and Hytopia (from Tri Force Heroes) are different countries separate from the Kingdom of Hyrule, Termina (from Majora's Mask), the World of the Ocean King (from Phantom Hourglass), and Lorule (from A Link Between Worlds) serve as parallel worlds, and Koholint is an island far away from Hyrule that appears to be part of a dream.

=== Story ===
The world of Hyrule was created by three golden goddesses: Din, Farore, and Nayru. They created the world to trap Null, which absorbed all life that appeared in an endless void created by it. Before departing, the three goddesses left the Triforce, a sacred artifact which could grant any wish to its user. It manifests as three golden triangles, each embodying one of the goddesses' virtues: Power, Courage, and Wisdom. However, as the Triforce has no will of its own and it can not judge between good and evil, it will grant any wish indiscriminately. Because of this, it was placed within an alternate world called the "Sacred Realm" until one worthy of its power and has the balanced virtues of Power, Courage, and Wisdom in their heart could obtain it in its entirety. If a person does not possess a balanced heart and tries to use the Triforce, it will split into three parts; the virtue that the user mostly believes in will stay with that person and the remaining two will seek out others. In order to master and control the triforce as a whole, the user must get the other parts found in other individuals and bring them together to reunite them. The Sacred Realm can itself be affected by the heart of those who enter it: a pure heart will make it a paradise while evil will transform it into a dark realm.

The Triforce is represented as three conjoined golden triangles.

In Skyward Sword, the Triforce was sought by the demon king Demise, an eternal being that had conquered time itself. After a long battle against the goddess Hylia, guardian of the Triforce, Demise was sealed away within her temple. Hylia, placing the world's inhabitants known as Hylians on a floating island in the sky called Skyloft to protect them, orchestrated a means to stop the demon from escaping: creating the Goddess Sword (later becoming the Master Sword) for her chosen hero and discarding her divinity to be reborn among the people of Skyloft. In time, Zelda and Link (the reborn Hylia and her predestined warrior) enacted the goddess's plan and Demise was destroyed, but he vowed that his rage would be reborn and forever plague those descended from Link and Zelda. Following the establishment of Hyrule Kingdom, Demise's prophecy came to fruition in Ocarina of Time, when Ganondorf's attempt to get the Triforce scattered it with him gaining the Triforce of Power. The Triforce of Wisdom ended up with the Hylian princesses descended from Zelda, each named after her, while the Triforce of Courage is passed to a youth named Link across generations. While the Triforces of Power and Wisdom have been part of the series since the original The Legend of Zelda, it was in Zelda II: The Adventure of Link that the Triforce of Courage was introduced, being obtained by Link at the end of his quest. The Triforce, or even a piece of it, is not always distributed as a whole. Such as in The Wind Waker, Link must find all the pieces (called Triforce Shards) of the Triforce of Courage before he can return to Hyrule. Even in the original The Legend of Zelda, Zelda breaks her Triforce of Wisdom into eight pieces for Link to find, before she was captured by Ganon.

==== Fictional chronology ====
The Legend of Zelda story chronology
Skyward Sword; The Minish Cap; Four Swords; Ocarina of Time
The Hero is Defeated	The Hero is Victorious	
The Hero is Defeated	Child Era	Adult Era
A Link to the Past; Link's Awakening; Oracle of Seasons & Ages; A Link Between Worlds; Tri Force Heroes; Echoes of Wisdom; The Legend of Zelda; The Adventure of Link	Majora's Mask; Twilight Princess; Four Swords Adventures	The Wind Waker; Phantom Hourglass; Spirit Tracks
Breath of the Wild; Tears of the Kingdom

The chronology of the Legend of Zelda series was a subject of much debate among fans until an official timeline was released within the Hyrule Historia collector's book, first released in Japan in December 2011. Prior to its release, in a 2003 interview, series creator Shigeru Miyamoto confirmed the existence of an internal document which connected all the games, with series producer Eiji Aonuma later revealing in 2010 the confidential nature of this document, which only Miyamoto himself and the director of each game had access to.

In-game content, marketing material, and developer statements once partially established a timeline of the released installments: the original The Legend of Zelda was followed by Zelda II: The Adventure of Link, which takes place several years later; A Link to the Past is a prequel to the previous two games, and is followed by Link's Awakening; the events of Ocarina of Time occur many centuries before A Link to the Past (according to character designer Satoru Takizawa, it was meant to implicitly tell the story of the Imprisoning War), and was followed by Majora's Mask; Four Swords predates Ocarina of Time; The Wind Waker takes place in one of the parallel timelines that emerged from Ocarina of Time, more than a century later; Four Swords Adventures, upon its release, was considered to be a direct sequel to Four Swords, set sometime after its events; The Minish Cap is a prequel to Four Swords, telling of the origins of the villain Vaati and the creation of the Four Sword; Twilight Princess takes place after Majora's Mask; Phantom Hourglass is a sequel to The Wind Waker, and is followed by Spirit Tracks, which is set about a century later on a land far away from the setting of The Wind Waker; and Skyward Sword precedes The Minish Cap, telling the story of the creation of the Master Sword.

In the early 2000s, Nintendo of America released a timeline on the official website of the series as one of the possible interpretation of the events from all entries released up to that point, featuring a single protagonist named Link, the "Hero of Time" from its first adventure in Ocarina of Time. It was followed by Majora's Mask, A Link to the Past, Oracle of Seasons, Oracle of Ages, the original The Legend of Zelda, Zelda II: The Adventure of Link, and finally Link's Awakening. In 2011, series translator Daniel Owsen revealed that, at one point, he and his coworkers at Nintendo of America conceived another complete timeline and intended to make it available online, but the Japanese series developers rejected the idea so that the placement of each game would be kept open to the imagination of the players.

On December 21, 2011, to celebrate the 25th anniversary of the series, The Legend of Zelda: Hyrule Historia art book was published by Shogakukan, which contained an official timeline of the fictional chronology of the series up to that point. This timeline subsequently posits that following Ocarina of Time, it splits into three alternate routes: in one, Link is defeated by Ganon, leading into the Imprisoning War and A Link to the Past, Oracle of Seasons and Oracle of Ages, Link's Awakening, The Legend of Zelda and The Adventure of Link. The second and third, where Link successfully defeats Ganon, lead to a split timeline between his childhood (where Zelda sends him back in time so he can use the wisdom he has gained to warn young Zelda of the fate of Hyrule) and adulthood (where adult Zelda lives on to try and rebuild her kingdom). His childhood continues with Majora's Mask, followed by Twilight Princess and Four Swords Adventures. The timeline from his adult life continues into Wind Waker, Phantom Hourglass and Spirit Tracks.

Released in 2013, A Link Between Worlds takes place six generations after A Link to the Past, and features the Triforce being reunited and Ganon being resurrected. 2015's Tri Force Heroes is a direct sequel to A Link Between Worlds and takes place several years later.

In 2018, Nintendo revealed the placement of the timeline of the previous year's Breath of the Wild was after all previous games in the series, without specifying a connection to any of the three timeline branches. Aonuma and Breath of the Wild director Hidemaro Fujibayashi justified the vague placement with the previous idea of keeping it open to players' imaginations. Nintendo moved Link's Awakening to take place before Oracle of Seasons and Oracle of Ages. In 2020, Nintendo released Hyrule Warriors: Age of Calamity, a follow-up to the 2014 spin-off game Hyrule Warriors, set 100 years before Breath of the Wild, but with the events of Age of Calamity diverging from the backstory established in Breath of the Wild, ostensibly creating an alternate timeline separate from it. Events depicted within Age of Calamity unrelated to its use of time travel, however, differ from events established in Breath of the Wild and its supplementary art book, Creating a Champion - such as Link pulling the Master Sword during the events of Age of Calamity, when he was previously established to have obtained it in his youth - rendering Age of Calamity wholly non-canonical. In 2023 Tears of the Kingdom, a direct sequel to Breath of the Wild, was released; it depicts the Imprisoning War as taking place shortly after Hyrule's founding by the Zonai king, Rauru. In 2025 Echoes of Wisdom was added to the timeline after Tri Force Heroes and before The Legend of Zelda. Hyrule Warriors: Age of Imprisonment takes place during the events of Tears of the Kingdom, where Zelda was sent back in time to when Hyrule was founded and fights in the Imprisoning War. To date, it is the only canonical Hyrule Warriors game.

=== Characters ===
==== Link ====
The central protagonist of The Legend of Zelda series, and the primary player character of every individual game except for Echoes of Wisdom, Link is the name of various Hylian young men or boys who characteristically wear a green tunic and a pointed cap, and are the bearers of the Triforce of Courage. In most games, the player can give Link a different name before the start of the adventure, and he will be referred by that given name throughout by the non-player characters (NPCs). Miyamoto said in a 2002 interview that he named the protagonist "Link" because the character is/was supposed to be the "link" between the player and the game world. The various Links each have a special title, such as "Hero of Time", "Hero of Winds" or "Hero of the Wild". Like many silent protagonists in video games, Link does not speak and only produces grunts, yells, and similar sounds, but he is not mute – dialogue from him is referenced second-hand by in-game characters, despite not being seen or heard by the player. Link is depicted as a silent protagonist so that the audience is able to have their own thoughts as to how their Link would answer the characters instead of him having scripted responses.

==== Princess Zelda ====
Princess Zelda is the princess of Hyrule and the guardian of the Triforce of Wisdom. Her name is present in many of her ancestors and descendants. She sometimes plays a supporting role in battle, using magical powers and weapons such as Light Arrows to aid Link. She was not playable in the main series until Spirit Tracks, where she becomes a spirit and can possess a Phantom Knight that can be controlled by the player, and becomes the primary playable character in Echoes of Wisdom, in which Link is largely absent and Zelda does not speak. Zelda appears under various other aliases and alter egos, including Sheik (in Ocarina of Time) and Tetra (in The Wind Waker and Phantom Hourglass). In Skyward Sword, it is revealed that the Zelda of that game is a reincarnation of the goddess Hylia, whose power flows through the royal bloodline. The name "Zelda" derives from the American novelist Zelda Fitzgerald.

==== Ganon ====
Ganon, also known as Ganondorf in his Gerudo form, is the main antagonist of the series and serves as the final boss for many of the games. In the series, Ganondorf is the leader of a race of desert brigands called the Gerudo, which consists entirely of women save for one man born every one hundred years. He is significantly taller than other human NPCs, but his looks vary between games, often taking the form of a monstrous anthropomorphic boar. His specific motives vary from game to game, but most often, he seeks the complete Triforce, a powerful magical relic, part of it often in the possession of Link and Zelda. He often possesses a portion of the Triforce called the Triforce of Power, which gives him great strength, but it is often not enough to accomplish his ends, leading him to hunt the remaining Triforce pieces. Unlike Link, Zelda, and most other recurring characters, he is actually the same person in every game, with the exception of Four Swords Adventures, where he is a reincarnation of the original. In each game the battles with him are different and he fights using different styles. The game Skyward Sword indicates that Ganon is a reincarnation of a Demon King known as Demise.

== Main series ==
The Legend of Zelda, released in 1986 for the Famicom Disk System, was the first game in the series – it featured an open world, and nonlinear gameplay.

Main series release timeline (Note: With the exception of Four Swords Anniversary Edition, everything through Breath of the Wild for the Wii U and Nintendo Switch is considered a main series title by The Legend of Zelda Encyclopedia, including the remakes.) Original releases in bold
1986	**The Legend of Zelda**
1987	**The Adventure of Link**
1988–1990
1991	**A Link to the Past**
1992
1993	**Link's Awakening**
1994–1997
1998	**Ocarina of Time**
1998	Link's Awakening DX
1999
2000	**Majora's Mask**
2001	**Oracle of Seasons and Oracle of Ages**
2002	**Four Swords**
2002	**The Wind Waker**
2003
2004	**Four Swords Adventures**
2004	**The Minish Cap**
2005
2006	**Twilight Princess**
2007	**Phantom Hourglass**
2008
2009	**Spirit Tracks**
2010
2011	Ocarina of Time 3D
2011	Four Swords Anniversary Edition
2011	**Skyward Sword**
2012
2013	The Wind Waker HD
2013	**A Link Between Worlds**
2014
2015	Majora's Mask 3D
2015	**Tri Force Heroes**
2016	Twilight Princess HD
2017	**Breath of the Wild**
2018
2019	Link's Awakening
2020
2021	Skyward Sword HD
2022
2023	**Tears of the Kingdom**
2024	**Echoes of Wisdom**
2025	Breath of the Wild – Nintendo Switch 2 Edition
2025	Tears of the Kingdom – Nintendo Switch 2 Edition
2026	Ocarina of Time

=== 1986–1997: 2D origins ===
The Legend of Zelda, the first game of the series, was first released in Japan in February 1986, on the Famicom Disk System. A cartridge version for the Nintendo Entertainment System, using battery-backed memory, was released in 1987 in the United States on August 22, and in Europe on November 27. The game features a "Second Quest", accessible either upon completing the game, or by registering one's name as "ZELDA" when starting a new quest. The "Second Quest" features different dungeons and item placement, and more difficult enemies.

The second game, Zelda II: The Adventure of Link, was released on the Famicom Disk System in Japan in January 1987, and for the Nintendo Entertainment System in Europe in September 1988 and North America in December 1988. The game exchanged the top-down perspective for side-scrolling (though the top-down point of view was retained for overworld areas), and introduced RPG elements (such as experience points) not used previously or thereafter in the series.

A Link to the Past returned to the top-down view and added the concept of an alternate dimension, the Dark World. The game was released on the Super NES in November 1991. A Link to the Past was re-released on the Game Boy Advance in 2002. The SNES version was later re-released on the Wii Virtual Console in January 2007, on the Wii U Virtual Console, and on Nintendo Classics.

The next game, Link's Awakening, for Nintendo's Game Boy, is the first Zelda for a handheld, and the first set outside Hyrule and to exclude Princess Zelda. Link's Awakening was re-released, in full color, as a launch game on the Game Boy Color in 1998 as Link's Awakening DX. This remaster features additions such as an extra color-based dungeon and a photo shop that allows interaction with the Game Boy Printer. Link's Awakening DX was released on the Nintendo 3DS Virtual Console in June 2011. An HD remake of Link's Awakening was released on the Nintendo Switch in 2019.

=== 1998–2001: Transition to 3D ===
The series made the transition to 3D with Ocarina of Time for the Nintendo 64, which was released in November 1998. This game, initially known as Zelda 64 and in development for the Japanese-only 64DD before converting to cartridge format when the hardware was delayed, retains the core gameplay of the previous 2D games. A new gameplay mechanic, lock-on targeting, enables more precise sword fighting in a 3D space by focusing the camera on a nearby target and alters the player's actions relative to that target. The game heavily uses context-sensitive button play, having the player control various actions, each handled slightly differently, using only one button on the controller (e.g. standing next to a block and pressing A would make Link grab it, enabling him to push or pull it, but moving forwards into a block and tapping A has Link climb the block). The game debuted Link's horse, Epona, allowing Link to travel quickly across land and fire arrows from horseback. Widely acclaimed as one of the greatest video games ever made, Ocarina of Time achieved massive commercial success and universal critical praise, earning numerous perfect scores and consistent top rankings on definitive "best of all time" lists from publications such as IGN and Electronic Gaming Monthly. In February 2006, it was ranked by Nintendo Power as the best game released on a Nintendo console. The cancelled 64DD expansion for Ocarina of Time, known as Ura Zelda during development, was re-released on the GameCube in 2002 as a pre-order incentive for The Wind Waker in the U.S., Canada and Japan. Named Ocarina of Time Master Quest, the game was given reorganized dungeon layouts for greater difficulty. Europe would receive this "Two-Game Bonus Disc" free in every copy of The Wind Waker, except for the discounted Player's Choice version. Ocarina of Time was available through the Wii and Wii U's respective Virtual Console services and Ocarina of Time has been made available through Nintendo Classics in HD resolution on the Nintendo Switch and Switch 2. Ocarina of Time 3D for the Nintendo 3DS, featuring remade graphics and stereoscopic 3D, was released in June 2011. A second remake released in November 2026 on the Nintendo Switch 2.

Ocarina of Time, released in 1998 on the Nintendo 64, was the first 3D game in the series.

Ocarina of Time's follow-up, Majora's Mask, was released in April 2000. It uses the same 3D game engine as the previous game, and added a time-based concept, in which Link relives the events of three days as many times as needed to complete the game's objectives. It was originally called Zelda Gaiden, a Japanese title that translates as Zelda Side story. Gameplay changed significantly; in addition to the time-limit, Link can use masks to transform into creatures with unique abilities. While Majora's Mask retains the graphical style of Ocarina of Time, it is also a departure, particularly in its atmosphere. It features motion-blur, unlike its predecessor. The game is darker in tone, dealing with death and tragedy in a manner not previously seen in the series, and has a sense of impending doom, as a large moon slowly descends upon the land of Termina to destroy all life. Majora's Mask was available on the Wii and Wii U Virtual Console catalogues. The Legend of Zelda: Majora's Mask 3D was released on the 3DS in North America, Europe, Japan, and Australia in February 2015. The Nintendo 64 version was added to Nintendo Classics in February 2022.

Oracle of Seasons and Oracle of Ages were released simultaneously on the Game Boy Color in 2001, and interact using passwords or a Game Link Cable. After one game has been completed, the player is given a password that allows the other game to be played as a sequel. They were developed by Flagship in conjunction with Nintendo, with supervision from Miyamoto. After the team experimented with porting the original The Legend of Zelda to the Game Boy Color, they decided to make an original trilogy to be called the "Triforce Series". When the password system linking the three games proved too troublesome, the concept was reduced to two games at Miyamoto's suggestion. These two games became Oracle of Ages, which is more puzzle-based, and Oracle of Seasons, which is more action-oriented. Both titles were later released on the 3DS Virtual Console and Nintendo Classics.

=== 2002–2005: Introduction of Toon Link and multiplayer ===
Four Swords, released in 2002 on the Game Boy Advance, was the first multiplayer game in the series, and introduced a new cartoon art style.

The Game Boy Advance release of A Link to the Past in 2002 featured a new game, Four Swords, the first multiplayer Zelda. This game introduced Toon Link, a name first used in Super Smash Bros. Brawl to refer to cartoon-based visual designs of Link. Four Swords Anniversary Edition was released in September 2011, as free DSiWare available until February 20, 2012.

The Wind Waker, released in 2002 on the GameCube, was the first game in the series featuring cel shading.

The Wind Waker, a 3D cel-shaded game also featuring Toon Link, was released in Japan in December 2002, and the US and Europe in 2003. The gameplay centers on controlling wind with a baton called the Wind Waker and sailing a small boat around an island-filled ocean, retaining similar gameplay mechanics as the previous 3D games in the series. The Legend of Zelda: Collector's Edition, released on the GameCube in 2003, included the original The Legend of Zelda, Zelda II, Ocarina of Time, Majora's Mask, and a demo of The Wind Waker. The Legend of Zelda: The Wind Waker HD was released on the Wii U in 2013.

Four Swords Adventures was released on the GameCube in early 2004 in Japan and America, and January 2005 in Europe. Based on the handheld Four Swords, Four Swords Adventures was another deviation from previous Zelda gameplay, focusing on level-based and multiplayer gameplay. The game contains 24 levels and a map screen; there is no connecting overworld. For multiplayer features, each player must use a Game Boy Advance system linked to the GameCube via a Nintendo GameCube – Game Boy Advance link cable. The game features a single-player campaign, in which using a Game Boy Advance is optional. Four Swords Adventures includes two gameplay modes: "Hyrulean Adventure", with a plot and gameplay similar to other Zelda games, and "Shadow Battle", in which multiple Links, played by multiple players, battle each other. The Japanese and Korean versions include an exclusive third segment, "Navi Trackers", which contains spoken dialogue for most of the characters.

In November 2004 in Japan and Europe, and January 2005 in America, Nintendo released The Minish Cap on the Game Boy Advance. In The Minish Cap Link can shrink in size using a mystical, sentient hat named Ezlo. While shrunk, he can see previously explored parts of a dungeon from a different perspective, and enter areas through otherwise-impassable openings. It was later released on the Wii U Virtual Console and Nintendo Classics.

=== 2006–2011: Motion and touch-based swordplay ===
Twilight Princess was the first game in the series with motion controls, in which the player controls Link's sword using the Wii Remote (GameCube version pictured).

In November 2006, Twilight Princess was released as the first Zelda game on the Wii. It was later released in December as the last Nintendo-published game for the GameCube, the console for which it was originally developed. The Wii version features motion controls and a reversed world where everything that is in the west on the GameCube is in the east on the Wii. The display is mirrored in order to make Link right-handed to make use of the Wii Remote feel more natural for the majority of players. The game chronicles the struggle of a young adult Link to confront the troubles of the "Twilight Realm", a mysterious force that appears around and interacts with Hyrule. When he enters this realm, he is transformed into a wolf, and loses the ability to use his sword, shield or other items, but gains other abilities such as sharpened senses from his new form. Twilight Princess includes an incarnation of Link's horse, Epona, for fast transportation, and features mounted battle scenarios including boss battles that were not seen in previous games. Twilight Princess diverted from the cel-shading of Wind Waker, integrating graphics featuring more detailed textures, giving the game a darker atmosphere. The Legend of Zelda: Twilight Princess HD was released on the Wii U in 2016.

Phantom Hourglass was released in June 2007 in Japan and October in North America and Europe on the Nintendo DS. It had a cel-shaded 3D graphical design with top-down gameplay and gameplay optimised for the DS' touch screen. It was later released on the Wii U Virtual Console.

The next Legend of Zelda game for the DS, Spirit Tracks, was released in December 2009. In this game, the "spirit tracks", railroads which chain an ancient evil, are disappearing from Hyrule. Zelda and Link go to the Spirit Tower (the ethereal point of convergence for the tracks) to find out why, but villains Cole and Byrne (Note: Staven in European English-language releases.) steal Zelda's body for the resurrection of the Demon King. Rendered disembodied, Zelda is left a spirit, and only Link (and a certain few sages) can see her. Together they go on a quest to restore the spirit tracks, defeat the Demon King, and return Zelda to her body. Developed using a modified version of the Phantom Hourglass engine, the game's most significant new mechanic allows Zelda to possess and periodically control Phantom Guardians—a recurring enemy type from the previous title. It was later released on the Wii U Virtual Console.

Skyward Sword for the Wii was in development since the end of 2000s. The game, the earliest in the Legend of Zelda timeline, reveals the origins of Hyrule, Ganon (here known as Demise), and many elements featured in previous games; it uses the Wii's MotionPlus feature as well. It was released in November 2011. An HD remaster, with optional button-only controls, was released on the Nintendo Switch in 2021.

=== 2013–present: Open-world emphasis ===
In 2013, Nintendo released A Link Between Worlds, a sequel to A Link to the Past, on the Nintendo 3DS. Progression is more open-ended than previous titles, with the possibility of completing many of the game's dungeons in any order. Certain dungeon obstacles require the use of rented or purchased items.

Tri Force Heroes, a cooperative multiplayer game, was released on the 3DS in October 2015.

Breath of the Wild was released in March 2017, as the last Nintendo-published game for the Wii U and a launch title for the Nintendo Switch. Similar to the original The Legend of Zelda, players are given little instruction and can explore the world freely. The world is designed to encourage exploration and experimentation and the main story quest can be completed in a nonlinear fashion. An enhanced port was released as a launch title for the Nintendo Switch 2 worldwide in June 2025.

A Breath of the Wild sequel, Tears of the Kingdom, was released on the Switch in May 2023. New to Tears of the Kingdom are the battery-powered Zonai devices, which the player can use for combat, propulsion, and exploration. The game also features the new abilities to fuse materials together, ascend through ceilings, reverse objects' movement through time, and autobuild structures. An enhanced port was released as a launch title for the Nintendo Switch 2 worldwide in June 2025.

Echoes of Wisdom, which features Zelda as the main protagonist, was released on the Switch in September 2024.

== Spin-off games ==
As the franchise has grown in popularity, several games have been released that are set within or star a minor character from the universe of The Legend of Zelda but are not directly connected to the main The Legend of Zelda series or its core timeline.

Three Zelda-themed LCD games were created between 1989 and 1992. (Note: One of these three, 1989's Zelda, is specifically listed as a spin-off title in The Legend of Zelda Encyclopedia. None of them are listed on core timelines.) The Game & Watch game Zelda was released first in August 1989 as a dual-screen handheld electronic game. It was re-released in 1998 as a Toymax, Inc. Mini Classic and was later included as an unlockable extra in Game & Watch Gallery 4, a 2002 compilation for the Game Boy Advance. While the Game & Watch Zelda was developed in-house by Nintendo, the subsequent two LCD games were developed by third parties under license by Nintendo. In October 1989, The Legend of Zelda was developed by Nelsonic as part of its Game Watch line. This game was an actual digital watch with primitive gameplay based on the original Legend of Zelda. In 1992, Epoch Co. developed Zelda no Densetsu: Kamigami no Triforce for its Barcode Battler II console. The game employed card-scanning technology similar to the later-released Nintendo e-Reader.

Three video games were developed and released on the CD-i in the early 1990s as a product of a compromise between Philips and Nintendo, after the companies failed to develop a CD-ROM peripheral for the Super NES. Created independently with no observation by or influence from Nintendo, the games are Link: The Faces of Evil, Zelda: The Wand of Gamelon, and later, Zelda's Adventure. Nintendo never acknowledged them in the Zelda timeline, (Note: Self evidenced from their absence from timelines in The Legend of Zelda Encyclopedia and the official Zelda website.) and they are considered to be in a separate, self-contained canon. These games are widely acknowledged to be the worst installments in the series, though have since gained a cult following in the form of internet memes.

The Satellaview games from The Legend of Zelda series (1995–1997) are spin-offs, not listed on core timelines of the franchise.

Other spin-off games include RPG Freshly-Picked Tingle's Rosy Rupeeland, its sequel Ripened Tingle's Balloon Trip of Love, and Balloon Fight rerelease Tingle's Balloon Fight for the Nintendo DS. All of these star Tingle.

Though also stated to be in the world of Twilight Princess, The Legend of Zelda Encyclopedia considers the rail shooter game Link's Crossbow Training for the Wii to be a spin-off.

Hyrule Warriors is a spin-off and a crossover game developed by Omega Force and Team Ninja which combined the setting of Nintendo's The Legend of Zelda series and the gameplay of Koei Tecmo's Dynasty Warriors series. It was released on the Wii U in August 2014. Hyrule Warriors Legends, a version for the Nintendo 3DS containing more content and gameplay modifications, was released in January 2016. The Nintendo Switch game Hyrule Warriors: Definitive Edition was released on the Nintendo Switch in 2018 and contained content from both the Wii U and 3DS versions.

To commemorate the launch of the My Nintendo loyalty program in March 2016, Nintendo released My Nintendo Picross: The Legend of Zelda: Twilight Princess, a nonogram puzzle game in the Picross series developed by Jupiter for download to the Nintendo 3DS.

Cadence of Hyrule, developed by Brace Yourself Games and released on the Nintendo Switch in June 2019, is an officially licensed crossover of Zelda with Crypt of the NecroDancer.

Hyrule Warriors: Age of Calamity, developed by Omega Force, shares the hack-and-slash style of the spin-off game Hyrule Warriors. (Note: Released in English in 2018, The Legend of Zelda Encyclopedia does not provide a statement on whether later Hyrule Warriors games from 2020 and 2025 are mainline Zelda games. It does consider the Wii U and 3DS games to be spin-offs.) Age of Calamity was released in November 2020.

A Zelda-themed variant of Vermin was included on the limited edition Game & Watch: The Legend of Zelda unit, released in 2021. This special edition of the Game & Watch also included The Legend of Zelda, The Adventure of Link, and Link's Awakening.

A third Hyrule Warriors game, Hyrule Warriors: Age of Imprisonment takes place during the events of Tears of the Kingdom, where Zelda was sent back in time to when Hyrule was founded and fights in the Imprisoning War. Age of Imprisonment was released in November 2025.

== Cancelled games ==
In 2001, Nintendo partnered with Capcom subsidiary Flagship to concurrently release The Legend of Zelda: Oracle of Seasons and The Legend of Zelda: Oracle of Ages for the Game Boy Color. The original plan, however, was to release three titles concurrently, but one title, The Legend of Zelda: Mystical Seed of Courage, had to be cancelled due to technical issues arising from complications related to the interconnected nature of the titles.

Close Nintendo collaborator Retro Studios did preliminary work on two separate Zelda pitches. Heroes of Hyrule would have been a Nintendo DS game that would have combined the traditional gameplay of the series with that of tactical role-playing games like Final Fantasy Tactics. They additionally proposed an action game for the Wii starring Sheik that would have explored the origins of the Master Sword. Both were cancelled after being rejected by Nintendo.

== Reception ==
Sales and aggregate review scores As of November 11, 2026.
Game	Year	Units sold (in millions)	GameRankings	Metacritic (out of 100)
The Legend of Zelda	1986	6.51	NES: 84%; GBA: 79%	NES: —; GBA: 84
The Adventure of Link	1987	4.38	NES: 78%; GBA: 69%	NES: —; GBA: 73
A Link to the Past	1991	7.43 (Note: A Link to the Past sales breakdown: Super Nintendo Entertainment System version: 4.61 million; Game Boy Advance version: 2.82 million)	SNES: 93%; GBA: 92%	SNES: —; GBA: 95
Link's Awakening	1993	10.29 (Note: Link's Awakening sales breakdown: Game Boy/Game Boy Color version: 3.83 million; Nintendo Switch version: 6.46 million)	GB: 90%; GBC: 91%; NS: 87%	GB: —; GBC: —; NS: 87
Ocarina of Time	1998	19.24 (Note: Ocarina of Time sales breakdown: Nintendo 64 version: 7.6 million; Nintendo 3DS version: 6.44 million; Nintendo Switch 2 version: 5.2 million)	N64: 98% GC: 90% 3DS: 94% NS2: —	N64: 99; GC: 91; 3DS: 94; NS2: 96
Majora's Mask	2000	6.80 (Note: Majora's Mask sales breakdown: Nintendo 64 version: 3.36 million; Nintendo 3DS version: 3.44 million)	N64: 92% 3DS: 90%	N64: 95; 3DS: 89
Oracle of Seasons and Ages	2001	3.96	GBC: (Seasons) 91% GBC: (Ages) 92%	—
Four Swords	2002	2.82	GBA: 92% DS: 85%	GBA: 95; DS: 85
The Wind Waker	2002	6.80 (Note: The Wind Waker sales breakdown: GameCube version: 4.43 million; Wii U version: 2.37 million)	GC: 94% Wii U: 91%	GC: 96; Wii U: 90
Four Swords Adventures	2004	—	GC: 85%	GC: 86
The Minish Cap	2004	1.76	GBA: 90%	GBA: 89
Twilight Princess	2006	10 (Note: Twilight Princess sales breakdown: GameCube version: 1.43 million; Wii version: 7.50 million; Wii U version: 1.15 million)	GC: 95% Wii: 95% Wii U: 86%	GC: 96; Wii: 95; Wii U: 86
Phantom Hourglass	2007	4.76	DS: 89%	DS: 90
Spirit Tracks	2009	2.96	DS: 87%	DS: 87
Skyward Sword	2011	7.82 (Note: Skyward Sword sales breakdown: Wii version: 3.67 million; Nintendo Switch version: 4.15 million)	Wii: 93%	Wii: 93; NS: 81
A Link Between Worlds	2013	4.26	3DS: 91%	3DS: 91
Tri Force Heroes	2015	1.36	3DS: 72%	3DS: 73
Breath of the Wild	2017	35.98 (Note: Breath of the Wild sales breakdown: Wii U version: 1.7 million; Nintendo Switch version: 34.28 million)	Wii U: 97%; NS: 97%	Wii U: 96; NS: 97; NS2: 95
Tears of the Kingdom	2023	22.90	—	NS: 96; NS2: 95
Echoes of Wisdom	2024	4.09	—	NS: 85

The Legend of Zelda series has received outstanding levels of acclaim from critics and the public. Ocarina of Time, Skyward Sword, Breath of the Wild and Tears of the Kingdom have each received a perfect 10/10 score by Edge magazine. All four plus Wind Waker also received a 40/40 score (10/10 by four reviewers) by Famitsu magazine, making Zelda one of the few series with multiple perfect scores. Ocarina of Time was listed by Guinness World Records as the highest-rated video game in history, citing its Metacritic score of 99 out of 100. Individual games in the Zelda series were also recognized as the most critically acclaimed games on the Nintendo 64, Game Boy Advance, and 3DS, and in the open-world genre. With Link appearing in nine of the 100 highest-rated games on Metacritic as of June 2025 (all of them in the Zelda series), he is listed by Guinness World Records as the "most critically acclaimed videogame playable character". Computer and Video Games awarded The Wind Waker and Twilight Princess a score of 10/10. A Link to the Past has won Gold Award from Electronic Gaming Monthly. In Nintendo Power's Top 200 countdown in 2004, Ocarina of Time took first place, and seven other Zelda games placed in the top 40. Twilight Princess was named Game of the Year by X-Play, GameTrailers, 1UP, Electronic Gaming Monthly, Spacey Awards, Game Informer, GameSpy, Nintendo Power, IGN, and many other websites. The editors of review aggregator website GameRankings gave Ocarina of Time its highest aggregate score. Game Informer has awarded The Wind Waker, Twilight Princess, Skyward Sword, A Link Between Worlds and Breath of the Wild with scores of 10/10. Phantom Hourglass was named DS Game of the Year by IGN and GameSpy. Airing in December 2011, Spike TV's annual Video Game Awards gave the series the first ever "Hall of Fame Award", which Miyamoto accepted in person. Ocarina of Time and its use of melodic themes to identify different game regions has been called a reverse of Richard Wagner's use of leitmotifs to identify characters and themes. Ocarina of Time was so well received that sales increased for real ocarinas. IGN praised the music of Majora's Mask for its brilliance despite its heavy use of MIDI. It has been ranked the seventh-greatest game by Electronic Gaming Monthly, whereas Ocarina of Time was ranked eighth. The series won GameFAQs Best Series Ever competition.

As of November 2026, The Legend of Zelda franchise has sold 164.12 million copies, with the original The Legend of Zelda being the fourth best-selling NES game of all time. The series was ranked as the 64th top game (collectively) by Next Generation in 1996. In 1999, Next Generation listed the Zelda series as number 1 on their "Top 50 Games of All Time", commenting that Zelda series had always more gameplay and innovations than most other titles in their series. According to Empire magazine, with "the most vividly-realised world and the most varied game-play of any game on any console, Zelda is a solid bet for the best game series ever".

The Legend of Zelda franchise has garnered the most Game of the Year nominations in the history of the Academy of Interactive Arts & Sciences' D.I.C.E. Awards with eight (Ocarina of Time, Majora's Mask, The Wind Waker, Twilight Princess, Skyward Sword, A Link Between Worlds, Breath of the Wild, and Tears of the Kingdom); two of them, Ocarina of Time and Breath of the Wild, would go on to win the top honor during their respective awards ceremonies.

== Legacy ==
Multiple members of the game industry have expressed how Zelda games have impacted them, including Rockstar Games founder and Grand Theft Auto director, Dan Houser, who said that Zelda and Mario games on Nintendo 64 greatly influenced them in developing Grand Theft Auto series, as well in other 3D games in general. Rockstar founder and Grand Theft Auto director Sam Houser also cited the influence of Zelda, describing Grand Theft Auto III as "Zelda meets Goodfellas". Ōkami director and PlatinumGames founder Hideki Kamiya said that he has been influenced by The Legend of Zelda series in developing the game, citing A Link to the Past as his favorite game of all time. Soul Reaver and Uncharted director, Amy Hennig (formerly of Crystal Dynamics and Naughty Dog), cited Zelda as inspiration for the Legacy of Kain series, noting A Link to the Past's influence on Blood Omen and Ocarina of Time's influence on Soul Reaver. Soul Reaver and Uncharted creator, Richard Lemarchand, also cited A Link to the Past's approach to combining gameplay with storytelling as inspiration for Soul Reaver. Wing Commander and Star Citizen director, Chris Roberts (Origin Systems and Cloud Imperium Games), cited Zelda as an influence on his action role-playing game, Times of Lore.

Dark Souls series creator Hidetaka Miyazaki named A Link To The Past as one of his favorite role-playing video games. Ico director Fumito Ueda cited Zelda as an influence on Shadow of the Colossus. Miyazaki also described The Legend of Zelda as a sort of textbook for 3D action games. Lionhead Studios founder Peter Molyneux stated that the Twilight Princess is one of his favorite games and an influence for the Fable series. Darksiders director David Adams (Vigil Games) cited Zelda as an influence on his work. Prince of Persia and Assassin's Creed director Raphael Lacoste cited The Wind Waker as an influence on Assassin's Creed IV: Black Flag. CD Projekt Red cited the Zelda series as an influence on The Witcher 3: Wild Hunt. Majora's Mask served as the primary influence on Alex Hall's web series Ben Drowned. Final Fantasy and The 3rd Birthday director Hajime Tabata cited Ocarina of Time as inspiration for the open world of Final Fantasy XV.

== Crossovers ==
The Legend of Zelda series has crossed over into other Nintendo and third-party video games, most prominently in the Super Smash Bros. series of fighting games published by Nintendo. Link appears as a fighter in Super Smash Bros. for the Nintendo 64, the first entry in the series, and is part of the roster in all subsequent releases in the series as well. Zelda (who can transform into Sheik), Ganondorf, and Young Link (the child version of Link from Ocarina of Time) were added to the player roster for Super Smash Bros. Melee, and appeared in all subsequent releases except for "Young Link" (who is later replaced by "Toon Link" from The Wind Waker, in subsequent releases Super Smash Bros. Brawl and Super Smash Bros. for Nintendo 3DS and Wii U). Sheik becomes a separate playable character from Super Smash Bros. for Nintendo 3DS and Wii U onwards. Both Young Link and Toon Link appear in the fifth installment, Super Smash Bros. Ultimate. Other elements from the series, such as locations and items, are also included throughout the Smash Bros. series, including Assist Trophies, where computer-controlled versions of characters in the Zelda series including Tingle, Skull Kid, Midna, and Skyward Sword antagonist Ghirahim can fight as an ally. Outside of the series, Nintendo allowed for the use of Link as a playable character exclusively in the GameCube release of Namco's fighting game Soulcalibur II.

Link, using a design based on Skyward Sword, appears as a playable character in Mario Kart 8 via downloadable content (DLC), along with a Hyrule Circuit racetrack themed on The Legend of Zelda series. The first pack is named after the series. In a post-launch update for Mario Kart 8 Deluxe, Link and his vehicle received alternate styles based on Breath of the Wild.

In the Wii U version of Sonic Lost World, a DLC stage based on The Legend of Zelda series was released in March 2014, named "The Legend of Zelda Zone". It was built around the core gameplay mechanics of Sonic Lost World, with some elements from the Zelda series, including a heart-based vitality meter, rupee collection, and a miniature dungeon to explore.

== In other media ==
=== TV series ===
A 13-episode American animated TV series, adapted by DiC and distributed by Viacom Enterprises, aired in 1989. The animated Zelda shorts were broadcast each Friday, instead of the usual Super Mario Bros. cartoon which was aired during the rest of the week. The series loosely follows the two NES Zelda games (the original The Legend of Zelda and The Adventure of Link), mixing settings and characters from those games with original creations. The show's older incarnations of both Link and Zelda appeared in various episodes of Captain N: The Game Master during its second season.

A live-action television series had been in development around 2015, as reported from an anonymous Netflix employee to The Wall Street Journal. The program was a joint effort between Netflix and Nintendo, and was said to be aimed as a family-friendly version of Game of Thrones. Further details of this series went sparse until 2021 when Adam Conover gave an interview regarding his College Humor period. There, the College Humor team had been planning a skit that would have combined Star Fox with Fantastic Mr. Fox and had even talked to Miyamoto on the project. Conover said that they were told about a month into the project that Nintendo had requested they stop all work on the project as a result of the leak related to the live-action Zelda show; Nintendo, already protective of its IP, had pulled many external projects including the live-action show.

=== Print media ===
Valiant Comics released a short series of comics featuring characters and settings from the Zelda cartoon as part of their Nintendo Comics System line. Manga adaptations of many entries in the series, including as of February 2022 A Link to the Past, Ocarina of Time, Majora's Mask, Oracle of Seasons and Oracle of Ages, Four Swords Adventures, The Minish Cap, Phantom Hourglass, and Twilight Princess have been produced under license from Nintendo, primarily written and drawn by Japanese artist duo Akira Himekawa. These adaptations do not strictly follow the plot of the games from which they are based and may contain additional story elements.

A number of official books, novels, and gamebooks have been released based on the series as well. The earliest was Moblin's Magic Spear, published in 1989 by Western Publishing under their Golden Books Family Entertainment division and written by Jack C. Harris. It took place sometime during the first game. Two gamebooks were published as part of the Nintendo Adventure Books series by Archway, both of which were written by Matt Wayne. The first was The Crystal Trap (which focuses more on Zelda) and the second was The Shadow Prince. Both were released in 1992. A novel based on Ocarina of Time was released in 1999, written by Jason R. Rich and published by Sybex Inc. under their Pathways to Adventure series. Another two gamebooks were released as part of the You Decide on the Adventure series published by Scholastic. The first book was based on Oracle of Seasons and was released in 2001. The second, based on Oracle of Ages, was released in 2002. Both were written by Craig Wessel. In 2006, Scholastic released a novel as part of their Nintendo Heroes series, Link and the Portal of Doom. It was written by Tracey West and was set shortly after the events of Ocarina of Time.

In 2011, to coincide with the 25th anniversary of the series, an art book, Hyrule Historia, was published in Japan by Shogakukan. It was followed by an international release by Dark Horse Books in 2013. It contains concept art from the series's conception to the release of Skyward Sword in 2011 and multiple essays about the production of the games, as well as an overarching timeline of the series. It also includes a prequel manga to Skyward Sword by Akira Himekawa. The English-language release took the number one spot on Amazon's sales chart, taking the spot away from E. L. James's 50 Shades of Grey trilogy. Dark Horse released The Legend of Zelda: Art & Artifacts, a follow-up art book to Hyrule Historia containing additional artwork and interviews, in North America and Europe in February 2017.

=== Music ===
Taking place in Cologne, Germany, on September 23, 2010, the video game music concert Symphonic Legends focused on music from Nintendo and, among others, featured games such as The Legend of Zelda. Following an intermission, the second half of the concert was entirely dedicated to an expansive symphonic poem dedicated to the series. The 35-minute epic tells the story of Link's evolution from child to hero.

To celebrate the 25th anniversary of the series in 2011, Nintendo commissioned an original symphony, The Legend of Zelda: Symphony of the Goddesses. The show was originally performed in the fall of 2011 in Los Angeles and consists of live performances of much of the music from the series. It has since been scheduled for 18 shows so far throughout the United States and Canada. Nintendo released a CD, The Legend of Zelda 25th Anniversary Special Orchestra CD. Featuring eight tracks from live performances of the symphony, the CD is included alongside the special edition of The Legend of Zelda: Skyward Sword for the Wii. Nintendo later celebrated The Legend of Zelda's 30th anniversary with an album which was released in Japan in February 2017.

The Nintendo Music streaming service included soundtracks from eight Zelda games as of June 2025 for subscribers to Nintendo Switch Online to stream and listen to, including The Legend of Zelda, A Link to the Past, Ocarina of Time, The Wind Waker, Ocarina of Time 3D, Skyward Sword, Breath of the Wild, and Tears of the Kingdom.

=== Merchandise ===
The Legend of Zelda-themed Monopoly board game was released in the United States in September 2014. A Clue board game in the style of The Legend of Zelda series was released in June 2017. A UNO-styled The Legend of Zelda game was released in February 2018, exclusively at GameStop in North America. A limited edition Zelda 25th anniversary 3DS was released in December 2011, in Australia. A 40th Anniversary Edition Nintendo Switch 2 bundle will be released on October 29, 2026.

=== Film ===
In 2007, Imagi Animation Studios, which had provided the animation for TMNT and Astro Boy, created a pitch reel for a computer-animated The Legend of Zelda film. Nintendo did not accept the studio's offer due to the memory of the failure of the 1993 live-action film adaptation of Super Mario Bros. In 2013, Aonuma said that, if the development of a film began, the company would want to use the opportunity to embrace audience interaction in some capacity. In June 2023, it was said that Nintendo was close to closing a deal with Illumination and Universal Pictures to produce a film adaptation of the franchise following the success of their film, The Super Mario Bros. Movie, but Illumination CEO Chris Meledandri denied these reports later that month.

By November 2023, Nintendo was developing a live-action Legend of Zelda film with Sony Pictures, which will co-finance and distribute it worldwide. Wes Ball is the director, with Derek Connolly writing the script, and Miyamoto and Avi Arad producing alongside Ball and his producing partner Joe Hartwick Jr. through their Oddball Entertainment company. In July 2025, Bo Bragason and Benjamin Evan Ainsworth had been cast as Zelda and Link respectively. The film was scheduled for worldwide release on March 26, 2027, which was later changed to May 7. Filming began in New Zealand in November 2025 and ended in April 2026.
