= Knutsford Little Theatre =

British amateur theatre group

- Formation: 1925; 101 years ago
- Type: Theatre group
- Website: www.knutsfordlittletheatre.com

Knutsford Little Theatre is an amateur theatre group based in Knutsford, United Kingdom. They were formed in 1925, as Knutsford Amateur Drama Society (KADS) and changed their name, after acquiring their own premises on Queen Street. They perform up to seven productions a year, including a very popular family pantomime and a youth production.

The society is run by its members who are entitled to vote at the annual award ceremony held as part of the AGM. The Society is part of the Cheshire Theatre Guild, and the National Operatic and Dramatic Association.

== History ==
The society was formed after a meeting in the Cranford Cafe on a date in March 1925 when a group of local residents met to discuss the formation of Knutsford Amateur Dramatic Society. There had been theatrical productions in Knutsford for a number of years prior to the meeting: the Y.M.C.A. had performed Thread of Scarlett, a play about a murder in Ashley that resulted in execution at Knutsford Prison, and the Young Liberals had also got in on the act with a performance of Between the Soup and the Savoury by Gertrude Jennings. There was clearly an appetite for theatre in the town and it seems that Mr H. T. Whitney, who was a dentist on Tatton Street and a member of Wilmslow Green Room Society, was a prime mover in getting KADS off the ground.

One of the first tasks of the newly formed committee seems to have been the creation of a concert party. One member, Miss Grice, was a pianist and her father Joseph first violin. A small orchestra was formed and music rehearsals took place in Mr Grice's garage and cycle shop on Princess Street. Rehearsals for the plays, however, were held in Kings Coffee House and performances were first at the Y.M.C.A., then at the Town Hall before moving to the Marcliff Cinema, on the site where the civic hall now stands. It was here that the society held some of its most spectacular early productions. The Knutsford Guardian reports fine performances in When We Are Married and The Shop at Sly Corner, whilst special praise is given to the scenery for The Importance of Being Ernest and We Must Kill Toni had genuine stained glass windows.

The Queen Street building now known to all as the Little Theatre was originally St Vincent's Roman Catholic School. The school, which opened in August 1888, was built under the supervision of Father Robert Maurice and had accommodated eighty children between the ages of three and fifteen years. When KADS mounted their first production there the stage was thirteen feet square with a narrow extension at the front that had been built by United States forces out of ammunition boxes. It was lit by a single bulb in each front corner. The stage crew rebuilt the stage to the full width of the auditorium but were still limited to twelve feet due to a Chancel Arch bang in the middle. The audience sat on school benches that they shuffled along until the person at the far end fell off!

Over the next few years KADS set about transforming their new theatre. A trap door was built to take advantage of the first floor and in 1950 a surplus pavilion from Mobberly Cricket Club was transported to Queen Street to form dressing rooms and a workshop. During the 1960s indoor toilets, proper seating and central heating was installed. The society continue to invest in the property and the auditorium and bar are now fitted to a very high standard. Photographs of productions and poster designs can be viewed on the theatre website and Cheshire Archives and Local Studies hold a programme from the 1971 - 72 season.

== Recent productions ==
Productions since January 2000 in reverse chronological order.

- Robin Hood - January 2020
- Grease - July 2019
- Teechers - November 2019
- Cinderella - January 2019
- A Bunch of Amateurs - June 2018
- Bugsy Malone - July 2017
- The Thrill of Love - April 2017
- Ali Baba and Some Thieves - January 2017
- Life Begins Again - November 2016
- Dazzle (A Summer Funfair Musical) - July 2016
- Unleashed - April 2016
- Snow White and the Seven Dwarves - January 2016
- Treasure Island - November 2015
- Be My Baby - September 2015
- Good Things - June 2015
- The Importance of Being Earnest - April 2015
- Just The Ticket - February 2015
- Aladdin - January 2015
- The Hound of the Baskervilles - November 2014
- My Boy Jack – September 2014
- Dazzle – A Musical Space–tacular – July 2014
- Natural Causes – May 2014
- Deathtrap – March 2014
- The Sleeping Beauty – January 2014
- The Flint Street Nativity – November 2013
- A Piece of Cake – September 2013
- Bouncers – June 2013
- Roleplay – March 2013
- Billy Bun and the Four Wishes – January 2013
- Player's Angels – September 2012
- Bugsy Malone – July 2012
- Bolt From the Blue – June 2012
- Ladies Day – March 2012
- Red Riding Hood – January 2012
- Gaslight – November 2011
- Lucky Sods – August 2011
- There Goes the Bride – June 2011
- The Knutsford Little Theatre International One Act Play Festival – April 2011
- The 39 Steps (play) – March 2011
- Cinderella – January 2011
- The Murder Room – November 2010
- Men of the World – September 2010
- Tin Pan Ali – July 2010
- Good Grief – June 2010
- Life Begins at Seventy – April 2010
- Killing Time – March 2010
- Dick Whittington – January 2010
- Mr Wonderful – November 2009
- London Suite – September 2009
- The Rocky Monster Show – July 2009
- Absurd Person Singular – June 2009
- Proscenophobia – March 2009
- The Snow Queen – January 2009
- Sufficient Carbohydrate – November 2008
- The Knutsford Little Theatre International Short Play Festival – October 2008
- The End of the Food Chain – September 2008
- Olivia – July 2008
- Wanted: One Body – June 2008
- The Odd Couple (Female) – April 2008
- Jack And The Beanstalk – January 2008
- Abigail's Party – November 2007
- They Came From Mars...Farndale – September 2007
- Shake, Ripple & Roll – July 2007
- Neville's Island – June 2007
- Blithe Spirit – April 2007
- Confusions – March 2007
- Snow White – January 2007
- Sleuth – November 2006
- Return to the Forbidden Planet – September 2006
- Skool & Crossbones – July 2006
- Salt of the Earth – June 2006
- Murder By the Book – April 2006
- Bazaar and Rummage – March 2006
- Aladdin – January 2006
- One For the Road – November 2005
- Who's On First – September 2005
- Helen Come Home – July 2005
- Unleashed – June 2005
- An Inspector Calls – April 2005
- The Kingfisher – March 2005
- Hickory Dickory Dock – January 2005
- Stop The World I Want To Get Off – November 2004
- On Monday Next – September 2004
- Bouncers & Shakers – August 2004
- Worzel Gummidge – July 2004
- My Mother Said I Never Should – May 2004
- Bouncers – April 2004
- Rattle Of A Simple Man – February 2004
- Sing a Song of Sixpence – January 2004
- Murder in the Alps – November 2003
- The Old Country – September 2003
- Drucula Spectacular – July 2003
- The Killing of Sister George – June 2003
- Cinderella – January 2003
- Shakers Re-stirred – August 2002
- Bugsy Malone – July 2002
- Charley's Aunt – June 2002
- Our Day Out – April 2002
- Educating Rita – March 2002
- Sleeping Beauty – January 2002
- Loot – October 2001
- Three One Act Plays – September 2001
- Shake, Ripple & Roll – July 2001
- Chase Me Up Farndale Avenue, S'il Vous Plait – April 2001
- Rough Justice – March 2001
- The Snow Queen – January 2001
- The Chiltern Hundreds – October 2000
- Dazzle – July 2000
- Big Bad Mouse – May 2000
- The Diary of Anne Frank – March 2000
- Dick Whittington And His Cat – January 2000
