= Talitha Stevenson =

- Born: 1977
- Known for: Novelist

Talitha Stevenson (born 1977) is an author and journalist, who grew up in West London.

== Fiction writer ==
Stevenson is the author of three novels. Her work has been compared to Ian McEwan and Jonathan Franzen.

Her first novel An Empty Room, a coming of age tale set in West London, was nominated for a number of awards.

Stevenson's second novel Exposure, the tale of a lawyer with a hidden past, received very strong notices. The Literary Review concluded: "Stevenson has, essentially, got it". A reviewer in The Guardian wrote: "Stevenson is an exceptionally talented writer". The Independent on Sunday called it a "triumphant read... What Stevenson describes with gobsmacking accuracy is our primal fear that life will unceremoniously unravel." In The Sunday Times, the novel was described as "accomplished", its scope as "ambitious". The Observer described her as "a writer of precocious talent". The American novelist Jay McInerney saluted "an incredible talent" who "writes like a very old soul, with an exquisitely-tuned sensitivity to sin, guilt and sexual obsession". The book was published by Harcourt in the US and received strong reviews.

Stevenson's third and most recent novel, Disappear, was published in March 2010. It was the paperback of the week in The Independent and The Observer, and was praised by Gregory David Roberts and Christos Tsiolkas.

In an interview with the American book blog booklush, Stevenson explained that she was writing an "intricate" new novel that deals with "painting and the contemporary art world".

== Journalism ==
Stevenson writes for the Financial Times and other newspapers, contributing features and book reviews on literature, social history, celebrity, psychiatry, and other subjects.

=== Bibliography ===
- An Empty Room (2003)
- Exposure (2005)
- Disappear (2010)

=== Awards and Prizes ===
- 2003 Whitbread First Novel Award (shortlisted) An Empty Room
- 2003 Commonwealth Writers Prize - Eurasia Region (shortlisted) An Empty Room
- 2003 Pendleton May First Novel Award (shortlisted) An Empty Room
- 2006 Dylan Thomas Prize (nominee) Exposure
