= The Legend of Zelda: Hyrule Historia =

Book by Nintendo

- Front cover of the standard English edition
- Editor: Patrick Thorpe
- Author: Nintendo
- Original title: ハイラル・ヒストリア ゼルダの伝説 大全
- Cover artist: Cary Grazzini
- Language: Japanese
- Series: The Legend of Zelda
- Genre: Video game art
- Published: 2011 (Nintendo) (Japanese); 2013 (Dark Horse Comics); 2013 (Norma Editorial) (Spanish); 2013 (Tokyopop) (German)
- Publication date: December 21, 2011
- Publication place: United States
- Media type: Print, digital (Wii U)
- Pages: 276
- ISBN: 978-1-61655-041-7

The Legend of Zelda: Hyrule Historia (Note: The Legend of Zelda: Hyrule Historia (Japanese: ハイラル・ヒストリア ゼルダの伝説 大全, Hepburn: Hairaru Hisutoria Zeruda no Densetsu taizen; lit. Hyrule Historia: The Legend of Zelda Encyclopedia)) is a collector's book about Nintendo's The Legend of Zelda series, published in English by Dark Horse Comics. The 276-page book reveals the official timeline of the fictional events in the series, following years of speculation by fans. The book also includes artwork for the games, a short manga, and a foreword and afterword written by the series' producers. It is the first in an official trilogy of art books known as the "Goddess Collection" that was published by Dark Horse in partnership with Nintendo and was completed by the publication of The Legend of Zelda: Art & Artifacts and The Legend of Zelda Encyclopedia. Hyrule Historia topped Amazon.com's list of bestselling books in February 2013 and was Amazon's sixth best-selling print book of 2013.

== Content ==
Hyrule Historia contains 276 pages of content that documents information about The Legend of Zelda series, including artwork and production notes. It includes three major sections: "The Legend Begins: The World of Skyward Sword", "The History of Hyrule: A Chronology", and "Creative Footprints: Documenting 25 Years of Artwork". Outside of those three sections, the book includes a foreword by series creator Shigeru Miyamoto, and an afterword from Eiji Aonuma, who produced recent games in the series. It also includes an art piece created for the 25th anniversary of the series (and the original cover of the English edition). Information about commemorative merchandise is also included. The book includes a manga at the end as a "Special Comic". It was written by Akira Himekawa, who have created other manga for the series. The manga takes place before the events of The Legend of Zelda: Skyward Sword.

The first section, "The Legend Begins: The World of Skyward Sword", focuses on the world of The Legend of Zelda: Skyward Sword due to the book being released alongside Skyward Sword in Japan. Images from the game, such as character designs, and commentary by the development team are also included. The section explores the development process for the game, presenting concept art for characters and locations, including artwork that was never used in the game.

The second section titled, "The History of Hyrule: A Chronology" establishes the official timeline of the fictional events that take place within the series, following years of speculation by fans. Nintendo qualified the timeline by stating that "this chronicle merely collects information that is believed to be true at this time" allowing the possibility for future changes.

The final major section, "Creative Footprints: Documenting 25 Years of Artwork", focuses on artwork based on chronological release date, depicting monsters and characters from rough drawings to final artwork, including the evolution of the main characters, Link, Zelda and Ganondorf. Some of the artwork had not been seen by the general public prior to the book's release.

A list of all official games in the series is included at the end of this section. Some spin-offs are not included, although The Legend of Zelda: Collector's Edition, The Legend of Zelda: Ocarina of Time Master Quest, the Satellaview Zelda games and Link's Crossbow Training are mentioned.

== Development ==
Producer Eiji Aonuma said staff members pored through "stacks of ancient documents" to produce the timeline in the book.

Hyrule Historia was originally released in Japanese with a brown cover and gold type, on 21 December 2011. It was released to coincide with the 25th anniversary of the series and the release of The Legend of Zelda: Skyward Sword. The book was published in Japan by Shogakukan Japan.

English book publisher Dark Horse Books inquired to Nintendo about working on a project together around 2009. However, Patrick Thorpe, who edited the English version, believes that fan demand was the real catalyst for the translation.

The translation was announced in August 2012. Six people worked on the translations while three people were assigned to design duties. The handwritten production and design notes were all translated. The English version is slightly larger than the Japanese version and uses heavier-weight paper, but it has essentially the same content as the original.

Cary Grazzini designed the cover of the English version. The cover for the English version was originally to include a brown background with artwork that included all the different versions and forms of Link. The intended cover was redesigned. The final English version featured a forest green cover. The series logo and a Triforce are embossed in gold. Also featured on the cover are the symbols of the three goddesses.

== Publication ==
The English edition was published by Dark Horse Comics on 29 January 2013. It was released in North America, Europe, and Australia. It was intended to sell for US$35 but many retailers sold it for around $20. Dark Horse started with a print run of 250,000 but expanded that to nearly 400,000 given demand for the book.

A collector's edition was also released. It had a limited print run of 4,000 copies and contains the same content as the standard edition. The limited edition features a faux leather hardcover that depicts the Gate of Time on the front and also has gold gilded pages.

A digital version of the book was also included with a limited edition Wii U bundle featuring The Legend of Zelda: The Wind Waker HD, which was released on 20 September 2013.

The book was eventually released in digital format on 14 April 2020.

Hyrule Historia was the first in a series of three books published by Dark Horse in partnership with Nintendo. The trilogy, known as the "Goddess Collection" was designed with the colours of the Golden Goddesses at the centre of Zelda lore, named Farore, Din, and Nayru. Dark Horse released The Legend of Zelda: Art & Artifacts, a follow-up art book to Hyrule Historia containing additional artwork and interviews, in February 2017. The third book titled The Legend of Zelda Encyclopedia contains additional information about every title starting with the first game up until Twilight Princess HD and was due to release in April 2018, but was eventually published on 19 June. The final book in The Legend of Zelda series of art books titled Master Works was released by Dark Horse on 20 November the same year in North America under the subtitle Creating a Champion.

== Sales ==
The book sold well. Preorders took the book to the top spot on Amazon.com's U.S. sales charts, moving Fifty Shades of Grey out of the top position. It reached the No. 1 position on Amazon.com's bestselling books list in August 2012 and January 2013. It spent three months in the top 100 books. It topped The New York Times Best Seller list in the "Hardcover Advice & Misc". category. and began at No. 1 on Publishers Weekly's Hardcover Nonfiction charts. It topped the Sunday Times bestseller list on 3 February and 17 February 2013.

Publishers Weekly estimated that the book sold approximately 441 copies each day in order to stay in Amazon.com's top five bestselling books. Nielsen BookScan estimated that the book sold 8,573 copies during the week ending 24 February and 6,128 during the week ending 3 March 2013. Sunday Times estimated that the book had sold 9,255 copies in the U.K. as of 17 February 2013.

== Reception ==
The concept of the book was well-received, although reviewers leveled some criticisms at specific choices in the book. Jesse Schedeen from IGN gave it a score of 8.4 out of 10, describing the book as a "handsome hardcover tome...devoted entirely towards exploring and celebrating the long history of the franchise". He noted that the book focuses more heavily on the newer games in the series and considered that there is not enough emphasis on the pre-Nintendo 64 era and also no acknowledgement of the Philips CDi games, animated series or other multimedia spin-offs. He found the manga to be entertaining but wished it was printed entirely in colour. He also praised the quality and construction of the book, describing it as "impressive" and reasonably priced.

Destructoid's Chris Carter considered the physical aspect of the book to be "wonderfully crafted" and complimented the "beautifully minimalistic cover". He noted the book's heavy focus on Skyward Sword, but commented that the "first section was so well done that I gained a bit more appreciation for the game". He considered that the fictional timeline positions each game without it getting "too ridiculous". He opined that the "Creative Footprints" section is heavily focused on the more popular games in the series and that the list of games at the end feels like an afterthought as it only includes some of the spin-off games. He considered the manga to be too brief and wished it had more colour. He recommended the book to general Zelda fans but not to casual fans, partially due to the heavy focus on Skyward Sword.

Christian Donlan of Eurogamer described the book as a "handsome glossy-papered volume" and considered that the book reveals extensive information about the series without removing its mystery. He opined that the attempt to position all of the Zelda games on a single fictional timeline was "an odd idea, perhaps, but quite a nice one". He felt that the third section of the book was its star chapter, despite some of the reproductions being somewhat small.

Henry Gilbert writing for GamesRadar+ responded positively to the book, calling it "an incredibly classy collection that was worth the wait". He applauded the inclusion of the fictional timeline stating that "Historia at last gives the fans what they’d wanted for so long". He also praised the production quality, including the cover design, translation and paper stock.

Damien McFerran of Nintendo Life praised the quality of the content, stating that "it feels as if Nintendo has opened up its vaults and made available every single shred of information regarding the franchise". He commented on an imbalance in the coverage of some games compared to others, but noted that this is probably due to the higher availability of assets for the newer games. He considered the fictional timeline to offer a fresh perspective on each of the games and opined that this creates a renewed appreciation for them. Overall, he described the book as "a standout publication" and said, "even if you've only a passing interest in the adventures of Link, this should be a permanent addition to your coffee table or bookshelf".
