= Hidden Love (film) =

2007 film

- Directed by: Alessandro Capone
- Written by: Alessandro Capone; Luca D'Alisera; Danièle Girard
- Starring: Isabelle Huppert
- Cinematography: Luciano Tovoli
- Edited by: Roberto Perpignani
- Release date: 13 September 2007 (TIFF)
- Running time: 100 minutes
- Countries: Italy; Belgium
- Language: French
- Budget: $4.5 million
- Box office: $71,442

Hidden Love (French: L'Amour caché) is a 2007 Italian-Belgian drama film directed by Alessandro Capone and starring Isabelle Huppert.

== Cast ==
- Isabelle Huppert as Danielle
- Greta Scacchi as Dr. Dubois
- Mélanie Laurent as Sophie
- Olivier Gourmet as Morris
- Jean-Michel Larre as Luc
- Giorgio Lupano as Sébastien

== See also ==
- Isabelle Huppert on screen and stage
