= The Legend of Zelda Encyclopedia =

Book by Nintendo

- Front cover of the standard English edition
- Editor: Patrick Thorpe
- Author: Nintendo
- Original title: ゼルダの伝説 ハイラル百科
- Translator: Keaton C. White
- Cover artist: Cary Grazzini
- Language: Japanese; English
- Series: The Legend of Zelda
- Genre: Video game art
- Published: 2017 (Ambit Ltd) (Japanese); 2018 (Dark Horse Comics)
- Publisher: Dark Horse Comics
- Publication date: March 1, 2017
- Publication place: United States
- English publication date: June 2018
- Pages: 328
- ISBN: 978-1-5067-0638-2

The Legend of Zelda Encyclopedia (Note: The Legend of Zelda: Hyrule Encyclopedia (Japanese: ゼルダの伝説 ハイラル百科, Hepburn: Zeruda no Densetsu hairaru hyakka; lit. The Legend of Zelda: Hyrule Encyclopedia)) is a book about Nintendo's The Legend of Zelda video game series. It is published in English by Dark Horse Comics and is the third book in the "Goddess Collection" trilogy, following the publication of Hyrule Historia and Art & Artifacts. The encyclopedia was released to celebrate the 30th anniversary of The Legend of Zelda series. It provides a detailed compendium of the numerous fictional characters, creatures and items found within the first 30 years of the Zelda game series. It was published as a standard edition with a blue cover and a deluxe edition with a gold NES cartridge design in June 2018.

== Content ==
The Legend of Zelda Encyclopedia is a 328-page compendium that documents the fictional lore of Hyrule, the main setting for Nintendo's The Legend of Zelda video game series. It provides detailed listings of the many creatures, objects and characters that have appeared within the game series. The book features a comprehensive collection of enemies and items, potions to poes, an expansion of the lore touched upon in Hyrule Historia, concept art, screencaps, maps, main characters and how they relate. The contents cover fictional information from the original The Legend of Zelda game through to Twilight Princess HD. The book includes sketches and notes provided by the development team that worked on each game in the series. It also features an interview with the producer of The Legend of Zelda series, Eiji Aonuma.

== Development ==
Dark Horse series editor Patrick Thorpe reported that due to the size and detail of the contents, an intense work schedule was required in order to complete the book in time for its release date. The localisation process required several teams working on translation, fact checking, proofreading and design. Thorpe commented that he was particularly concerned about achieving accurate information for such a large amount of detail, particularly due to the expectations of the existing fan base. He said that "there are tens of thousands, potentially one hundred thousand different things that needed to be sourced. Every single proper name, every title, every item". Various details proved to be problematic, such as enemies that appear in the games that had never been named or had only been named in Japan. In cases of ambiguity or contradictory information, Thorpe consulted with Nintendo to make a mutual decision on how to document information. Thorpe stated that The Legend of Zelda Encyclopedia aimed to complete the detailed fictional chronology of The Legend of Zelda game series that was first provided in Hyrule Historia: "People drove themselves crazy over it. 'The Encyclopedia' is the culmination of all that: Here's exactly how every single thing fits into this big puzzle".

The encyclopedia was intended to be content dense and also complement its predecessors. Whereas Hyrule Historia provides information about producing the games and Art & Artifacts focuses on the artwork, The Legend of Zelda Encyclopedia was designed to cover in-game information for the first 30 years of the Zelda series. The three books were designed with hardback covers in the colours of the three Golden Goddesses that appear at the centre of Zelda lore, Farore, Din, and Nayru, with the encyclopedia being presented in blue to represent the Goddess of Wisdom, Nayru. The deluxe edition was designed to resemble the gold NES cartridge edition of the original The Legend of Zelda game using gold foil and gloss laminate. It was originally intended for another edition of Hyrule Historia, but was instead used for the encyclopedia and expanded to include a dust cover and instruction booklet.

== Publication ==
The Legend of Zelda Encyclopedia is the third book in an official series published by Dark Horse Comics as part of its "Goddess Collection" trilogy. It was published out of a partnership between Dark Horse and Nintendo for the preceding art books Hyrule Historia and Art & Artifacts. The book series is a localisation of art books that were created in Japan. The Japanese edition of the encyclopedia was published in March 2017 by Tokuma Shoten. The series acts as a reference guide to The Legend of Zelda video game series and documents artwork and promotional material from the games. Two editions of the encyclopedia were published on 19 June 2018, including a standard edition with a blue cover and a deluxe edition designed with the appearance of a classic gold NES cartridge. The encyclopedia was originally intended to be published in April, but was pushed back until June. Like Art & Artifacts, it was released to celebrate the 30th anniversary of The Legend of Zelda series.

== Sales ==
Due to the high number of pre-orders, the book entered its second print run before the release date. The Washington Post listed The Legend of Zelda Encyclopedia in top position on its bestseller list for national nonfiction for the week of 24 June 2018. Publishers Weekly listed it in fourth place on the bestseller list for 2 July, while the deluxe edition ranked in tenth place in hardcover nonfiction. The two editions sold 34,000 printed copies combined on release.

== Reception ==
Seth G. Macy for IGN included the deluxe edition on a list of "coolest video game art books", describing the attention to detail as "amazing" and opined that the book is "chock full of amazing information". Rich Meister writing for Destructoid responded positively to the gold cartridge design of the deluxe edition, describing it as "one hell of a nostalgia trip". Sara Gitkos of iMore described the encyclopedia as a, "beautiful hardcover book" and "the perfect choice for Zelda fans who want to read up on everything that makes up Hyrule's world, from the beasts to weaponry".

Although the encyclopedia was intended to be an official fictional history for The Legend of Zelda series, critics have noted that it features various typos, inaccuracies and changes to the fictional lore. The encyclopedia was also noted for revealing that the original The Legend of Zelda game is placed geographically in the Death Mountain area of A Link to the Past. It also makes significant changes to The Legend of Zelda timeline that was established in Hyrule Historia, by positioning Link's Awakening before the Oracle of Seasons and Oracle of Ages pair of games rather than behind them.
