= The Legend of Zelda: Art & Artifacts =

Book by Nintendo

- Front cover of the standard English edition
- Editor: Patrick Thorpe
- Author: Nintendo
- Original title: ゼルダの伝説 ハイラルグラフィックス
- Cover artist: Cary Grazzini
- Language: Japanese; English
- Series: The Legend of Zelda
- Genre: Video game art
- Published: 2016 (Japanese); 2017 (Dark Horse Comics)
- Publisher: Dark Horse Comics
- Publication date: August 26, 2016
- Publication place: United States
- English publication date: February 2017
- Pages: 428
- ISBN: 978-1-63008-938-2

The Legend of Zelda: Art & Artifacts (Note: The Legend of Zelda: Hyrule Graphics (Japanese: ゼルダの伝説 ハイラルグラフィックス, Hepburn: Zeruda no Densetsu hairaru gurafikkusu; lit. The Legend of Zelda: Hyrule Graphics)) is an art collection book about Nintendo's The Legend of Zelda video game series. It is published in English by Dark Horse Comics out of a partnership with Nintendo and is the second book of an official series called the "Goddess Trilogy" that began with the publication of Hyrule Historia and was completed with the publication of The Legend of Zelda Encyclopedia. It was released on February 26, 2017 to celebrate the 30th anniversary of The Legend of Zelda series. The book provides a collection of illustrations created in the first 30 years of The Legend of Zelda video games. Two editions were published including a standard edition with a red cover and a purple limited edition that depicts the Master Sword on its cover.

== Content ==
The Legend of Zelda: Art & Artifacts comprises 428 pages of official Nintendo artwork created for The Legend of Zelda series. It provides an extensive collection of artwork from the first 30 years of the series, including pixel art and promotional art, alongside interviews with the designers. The book includes, "rare promotional pieces, game box art, instruction booklet illustrations, official character illustrations, sprite art" and artwork that had not previously been released to the public. Patrick Thorpe, Dark Horse series editor stated that the book includes "nearly all of the fully realized artwork from the series from advertisements to instruction booklets and beyond".

The book is divided into three main sections. The first portion is the master illustrations section, which presents major artwork used for various Zelda games, such as cover art. The second section is titled Character Illustrations, which includes the main characters, villains and illustrations of all the items used in each game. The third section includes images of all the game logos and packages and also features concept art for The Legend of Zelda: Breath of the Wild.

== Development ==
Art & Artifacts was a continuation of the partnership between Dark Horse Comics and Nintendo that had begun with the development of Hyrule Historia. Patrick Thorpe, Dark Horse series editor explained that following the success of Hyrule Historia, the Dark Horse team thrashed out ideas for a follow-up book. Designer Cary Grazzini came up with the idea to use the Master Sword for the cover of the special edition as it was considered to be the most important fictional artifact to feature in The Legend of Zelda games. The 3D embossing was used so that the Master Sword design was raised and shaped like a sword. The design was created to scale to give readers the impression of drawing the Master Sword from its scabbard.

== Publication ==
Art & Artifacts was released as part of Nintendo's 30th anniversary of The Legend of Zelda series. It was published on February 21, 2017, which was the 31st anniversary of the original 1986 The Legend of Zelda game. It is the second book in the "Goddess Trilogy" following the publication of Hyrule Historia, which was developed as the result of a partnership between Dark Horse Comics and Nintendo. Having been first published in Japan in 2016 with the title Hyrule Graphics, the book was translated and prepared for a Western audience. The three volumes in the "Goddess Trilogy" were created to complement each other, with each book representing one of the three Golden Goddesses that appear in Zelda lore. The third book of the series was titled The Legend of Zelda Encyclopedia.

Two hardcover editions of Art & Artifacts were published, both containing the same content. The standard edition was published with a red cover, while the limited edition features a purple cover, a design of the Lost Woods and gilded pages. The limited edition was designed to give the reader the impression of unsheathing the Master Sword by featuring a plastic slipcase that depicts the Master Sword scabbard, which when removed, reveals a 3D embossed image of the Master Sword on the book's cover. Only 10,000 copies of the limited edition were printed for publication.

== Sales ==
Publishers Weekly reported that Art & Artifacts ranked at the top position in the category of adult nonfiction sales for the week ending February 26, 2017, having sold almost 29,000 copies upon release. In the week of March 6, it topped the bestseller list, while the limited edition ranked in 20th position in hardcover nonfiction.

== Reception ==
Susana Polo writing for Polygon described the book as "a truly beautiful thing". Thomas Whitehead of Nintendo Life described the limited edition as "gorgeous" but commented that the core content is the same as the standard edition. Seth G. Macy writing for IGN included the book on a list of, "15 great books about video games", describing it as "one of my all-time favorites". Jeremy Parish for USgamer opined that "its illustrated spreads certainly look worth the asking price for serious fans of the series and its history".
