= Mario Party 64 =

Mario Party 64 can refer to, any of the first three Mario Party video games, simply because they were on Nintendo 64:

- Mario Party (video game), 1998
- Mario Party 2, 1999
- Mario Party 3, 2000
