= Mario Party Superstars =

2021 video game

- Developer: NDcube (Note: Additional work by CAProduction)
- Publisher: Nintendo
- Director: Takeru Sugimoto
- Producers: Toshiaki Suzuki; Toyokazu Nonaka; Kenji Kikuchi; Atsushi Ikeda
- Designers: Tsutomu Komiyama; Karin Kawakami; Ayumi Takimura
- Programmers: Yuuki Konno; Takumi Namba
- Artists: Susumu Kuribayashi; Keisuke Kasahara; Takamitsu Manabe; Saori Yamashita
- Composers: Masayoshi Ishi; Toshiki Aida; Satoshi Okubo
- Series: Mario Party
- Platform: Nintendo Switch
- Release: October 29, 2021
- Genre: Party
- Modes: Single-player, multiplayer

Mario Party Superstars (Note: Japanese: マリオパーティ スーパースターズ, Hepburn: Mario Pāti Sūpāsutāzu) is a 2021 party video game developed by NDcube and published by Nintendo for the Nintendo Switch. It is the 12th home console installment in the Mario Party series, and the second for the Nintendo Switch following Super Mario Party (2018). It was released on October 29, 2021.

The game features five remade game boards from the original Nintendo 64 trilogy and a total of 100 minigames curated from previous entries in the series, similar to the Nintendo 3DS game Mario Party: The Top 100 (2017). Unlike Super Mario Party, Superstars can be played with button controls. Upon release, Mario Party Superstars received mostly positive reviews from critics who praised the game for its homage to the series' history with its classic minigames and boards, as well as its online functionality. A successor, Super Mario Party Jamboree, was released on October 17, 2024.

== Gameplay ==
Mario Party Superstars features gameplay similar to the first eight entries in the Mario Party series, without the vehicle mechanics from the previous two numbered console games. Four characters, played by either humans or artificial intelligence, traverse one of five game boards, collecting coins and stars. The player with the most stars at the end of the game wins and becomes the Super Star. Stars are bought for twenty coins from Toadette, though can also be obtained via other methods. During a turn, each player rolls a die, enabling them to move the result of the roll—one to ten. Additionally, items may be used to affect themselves or other players. Between every round of four players moving, a randomly selected minigame of 100 is played. All 100 minigames are taken from the previous entries in the series, 55 of which originate from the Nintendo 64 trilogy.

"Mt. Minigames" is another game mode, which allows players to freely play minigames without boards.

All playable characters from the first four entries return, while Birdo and Rosalina are added.

== Release ==
Nintendo revealed the game during the Nintendo Direct at E3 2021 on June 15. The presentation revealed and featured remakes of the boards "Peach's Birthday Cake" from Mario Party and "Space Land" from Mario Party 2. Polygon's Ryan Gilliam noted that the boards included events not seen in the original versions; moreover, he commented that the game borrowed assets—such as the user interface—from its predecessor Super Mario Party. The presentation also confirmed that Birdo will return as a playable character for the first time since Mario Party 9 (2012). The third game board announced was "Woody Woods" from Mario Party 3, which was revealed on the game's official website. During a Nintendo Direct broadcast on September 23, the final two boards were revealed, being "Yoshi's Tropical Island" from Mario Party and "Horror Land" from Mario Party 2.

A few minigames from the original Mario Party which required players to rotate the analog stick as fast as they could make a return in Superstars; these minigames feature a warning not to rotate the analog stick with the palm of the hand. This was due to incidents where players of the original Nintendo 64 version sustained hand injuries from using the analog stick in this way.

== Reception ==
Reception

Aggregate scores
Aggregator	Score
Metacritic	80/100
OpenCritic	76% recommend

Review scores
Publication	Score
Destructoid	8/10
Game Informer	8/10
GameSpot	6/10
Hardcore Gamer	4/5
IGN	8/10
Jeuxvideo.com	15/20
Nintendo Life	8/10
Nintendo World Report	8.5/10
PCMag	3/5
Shacknews	8/10

Mario Party Superstars received "generally favorable" reviews from critics, according to the review aggregation website Metacritic. Fellow review aggregator OpenCritic assessed that the game received strong approval, being recommended by 76% of critics.

Mitchell Saltzman of IGN gave the game a "great" rating, stating: "Mario Party Superstars is an amalgamation of some of the best boards, minigames, mechanics, and quality of life improvements from the whole series, resulting in the best Mario Party has been in a very long time."

=== Sales ===
It sold 163,256 physical copies within its first week of release in Japan, making it the bestselling retail game of the week in the country. As of March 31, 2025, Mario Party Superstars had sold 14 million copies worldwide, making it the 18th best-selling game for the Nintendo Switch.

=== Awards and accolades ===
Year	Award	Category	Result	Ref.
2021	The Game Awards 2021	Best Family Game	Nominated	
2022	25th Annual D.I.C.E. Awards	Family Game of the Year	Nominated	
2022	18th British Academy Games Awards	Family Game	Nominated	
2022	2022 Kids' Choice Awards	Favorite Video Game	Nominated	

== See also ==
- List of Nintendo Switch games
- List of party video games
- List of video games featuring Mario
- 2021 in video games
