= Mario Party: Island Tour =

2013 video game

- Packaging artwork
- Developer: NDcube
- Publisher: Nintendo
- Director: Yukio Umematsu
- Producers: Miyuki Hirose; Atsushi Ikeda
- Designer: Shinichi Nakata
- Programmer: Michihito Ishizuka
- Artist: Yuji Asano
- Composers: Rei Kondoh; Sara Sakurai; Satoshi Okubo
- Series: Mario Party
- Platform: Nintendo 3DS
- Release: NA: November 22, 2013; HK/ROC: January 10, 2014; EU: January 17, 2014; AU: January 18, 2014; EA/JP/KOR: March 20, 2014
- Genre: Party
- Modes: Single-player, multiplayer

Mario Party: Island Tour (Note: Japanese: マリオパーティ アイランドツアー, Hepburn: Mario Pātī Airando Tsuā) is a 2013 party video game developed by NDcube and published by Nintendo for the Nintendo 3DS. The third handheld installment in the Mario Party series and the first to be released for the 3DS, the game was first announced during a Nintendo Direct in April 2013, and was released in North America in November 2013, in Europe and Australia in January 2014, and in Japan in March 2014.

Like most entries in the Mario Party series, Mario Party: Island Tour features up to four characters of the Mario franchise, each controlled by either a human player or artificial intelligence, competing in a board game with frequent minigames. In total, there are seven game boards, ten playable characters, and more than eighty minigames to choose from. There are also several game modes, including a single-player story campaign. Unlike with most Mario Party games, Mario Party: Island Tour's game boards have varying objectives, none of which involve collecting Stars or coins.

Mario Party: Island Tour received mixed reviews, with general praise for the variety in its game boards and minigames as well as criticism for its lack of an online multiplayer mode. The game has sold 2.95 million units worldwide, making it both the 24th-best-selling game for the Nintendo 3DS and a Nintendo Selects title. Mario Party: Island Tour was succeeded by Mario Party 10 for the Wii U in 2015.

== Gameplay ==
Wario, Princess Peach, Toad, and Mario competing in Mad Ladders/Rung Direction, one of the game's 81 minigames

Mario Party: Island Tour is a party video game similar to previous installments in the Mario Party series, wherein two to four players compete in a virtual board game. The game provides 10 playable characters – Mario, Luigi, Princess Peach, Princess Daisy, Wario, Waluigi, Yoshi, Boo, Toad, and Bowser Jr. – who can be controlled by human players as well as artificial intelligence (AI). During board games, players roll dice or use cards to move around the game board, with the space each player lands on potentially triggering an event or minigame. Mario Party: Island Tour features a total of 81 minigames, all of which are brand-new four-player free-for-alls. A few minigames require the use of augmented reality cards, StreetPass, or the Nintendo 3DS's built-in microphone, gyroscope, or touchscreen controls.

In addition to being played throughout parties, minigames can be played in three separate game modes. One of the game modes, Time Attack, tasks the player with completing the same set of 10 minigames as quickly as possible, while another mode, Hot-Air Hijinks, sees players competing to win three, five, or seven minigames before their rivals. There is also a "free play" mode, wherein players can select which minigames to play. Moreover, the game features a single-player campaign, Bowser's Tower, in which the player must defeat three computer-controlled doppelgängers of their character in one of two randomly chosen minigames on each level as they ascend Bowser's 30-floor tower, encountering a boss every five levels and dueling against Bowser at the top.

Mario Party: Island Tour offers seven game boards, most of which are hosted by Toad. Each board is rated based on skill, luck, and number of minigames; additionally, an expected play time is shown for each board. One of the game boards can be unlocked by completing five of the other boards, while another must be played with three or four human players. The boards have unique requirements, lengths, and obstacles, forgoing the series's traditional win condition, which revolves around Star and coin totals. For instance, on one board, Banzai Bill's Mad Mountain, players climb a mountain and hide in caves to avoid a Banzai Bill, which is launched whenever its icon is rolled, reducing the progress of anyone in its path. Another board, Bowser's Peculiar Peak, centers around players attempting to finish in last place rather than first. On the Kamek's Carpet Ride board, players use cards instead of dice to progress. On most boards, players race to the finish, collecting and using items to increase their chances of winning by enhancing the number of spaces moved or hindering opponents. Although the Mini Star system introduced in Mario Party 9 (2012) returns, it is exclusive to one game board, and characters once again move independently around the boards, as in traditional Mario Party titles.

The game also features a variety of collectables – including character voice recordings, music tracks, and figurines – which can be unlocked via StreetPass or purchased with Mario Party Points, which in turn are accumulated by playing through any of the game modes. Although Mario Party: Island Tour lacks an online multiplayer mode, the game utilizes the 3DS's Download Play functionality to support local multiplayer, permitting multiple nearby people with the system to play together using only one game cartridge.

== Plot ==
Mario and his friends are relaxing in front of Princess Peach's castle when they notice a descending bubble that contains a letter inviting everyone to the Party Islands, which are located in the sky. All of the characters happily accept and are promptly transported to the islands via bubbles. The gang is enjoying their time on the islands when Bowser suddenly appears and, out of jealousy over not being invited, builds his own tower nearby and creates bubbles that steal the fun from the Party Islands. The player's chosen character, accompanied by a green Toad, must advance up the tower, defeating bubble clones of every playable character, as well as periodical bosses. On the final floor, the player must defeat Bowser in a boss minigame, after which the player's character is able to reach the top of the tower and destroy the machine creating bubble clones. However, Bowser appears shortly thereafter and informs Mario and the Toad that the machine was merely a decoy before launching both of them off the tower, then challenging the player to take him on again.

== Development and release ==
Like all installments in the Mario Party series beginning with Mario Party 9, Mario Party: Island Tour was developed by NDcube and published by Nintendo. Nintendo President Satoru Iwata announced the game during a Nintendo Direct on April 17, 2013, at which time it was simply known by the tentative title Mario Party. It was indicated that Luigi would play an important role in the game due to it being released during the Year of Luigi. On October 1, 2013, Nintendo of Europe revealed in a press release that the game's release in Europe had been delayed from the winter of 2013 to early 2014.

Mario Party: Island Tour was released in North America on November 22, 2013, marking Mario Party's debut on the Nintendo 3DS. The game was released in the region alongside The Legend of Zelda: A Link Between Worlds for the 3DS and Super Mario 3D World for the Wii U. The game was later released in Europe on January 17, 2014; in Australia on January 18, 2014; and in Japan on March 20, 2014.

Mario Party: Island Tour was succeeded by Mario Party 10 for the Wii U in 2015.

== Reception ==
=== Critical response ===
Reception

Aggregate scores
Aggregator	Score
Metacritic	57/100
OpenCritic	3% recommend

Review scores
Publication	Score
Destructoid	4/10
Famitsu	8/10, 8/10, 8/10, 8/10
Game Informer	4/10
GameRevolution	3/5
GameSpot	7/10
GamesRadar+	3/5
IGN	5.5/10
Nintendo Life	6/10
Nintendo World Report	8.5/10
Official Nintendo Magazine	60%
Pocket Gamer	3/5
Polygon	5/10
The Guardian	3/5; 2/5
VG247	3.5/5
Digital Spy	2/5

Mario Party: Island Tour received "mixed or average" reviews from critics, according to the review aggregation website Metacritic. Fellow review aggregator OpenCritic assessed that the game received weak support, being recommended by 3% of critics. In Japan, four critics from Famitsu gave Island Tour a total score of 32 out of 40, with each critic awarding the game an 8 out of 10. Writing for Nintendo World Report, Kimberly Keller concluded: "Island Tour is a fine entry in the series that should bring out the competitive streak in all Mario Party fans, old or new." Hollander Cooper of GamesRadar+ added: "Island Tour isn't the Mario Party you remember, and that's not necessarily a bad thing. That said, there are definitely some missing pieces that keep it from being a memorable entry in the franchise." Writing for Shacknews, Steve Watts stated that the 3DS was "an odd choice", arguing that multiplayer-oriented party games like those in the Mario Party series conflicted with handheld systems being "innately a singular experience".

The variety in the game boards, particularly the differing win conditions, was frequently praised, though a few reviewers noted that most boards simply revolved around players attempting to reach the end first. Critics also appreciated the ratings for factors such as luck and skill, as well as the estimated play times, though some questioned the reliability of these statistics. Both Caitlin Cooke of Destructoid and Hollander Cooper of GamesRadar+ expressed disappointment with the series's traditional Star and coin system not returning in any of the boards. The short lengths of the boards were noted by several critics, including Nintendo Life's Dave Letcavage, who felt that this resulted in fewer minigames being experienced during each game. Other reviewers criticized the pacing of the boards, attributing this to having to wait for the other players – including the computer-controlled characters – to complete their turns.

Critical response to the minigame selection was also generally positive, with Letcavage calling it "one of the tightest collections of mini-games to be featured in the Mario Party series, optimized perfectly for pick-up-and-play sessions". Digital Spy's Liam Martin agreed that the minigames were "among the best we've played", and Polygon's Danielle Riendeau lauded the selection as not only the game's "greatest asset", but "possibly the best in the series". Numerous reviewers commended the implementation of a wide range of 3DS capabilities. However, IGN's Scott Thompson was more critical of the minigame selection, stating that the motion control made some minigames awkward to play. Thompson also noted an absence of non-four-player free-for-alls, such as teams of two and three against one, which he referred to as "an odd departure for the series". A handful of reviewers also spoke favorably of the minigame-focused game modes, especially the free play mode.

Reception toward the single-player campaign, Bowser's Tower, was more mixed; although the boss minigames were found enjoyable, the low and unchangeable difficulty levels of the player's AI opponents elicited criticism. GameSpot's Heidi Kemps referred to this mode as "a nice diversion" but weak in comparison to the story mode in Mario Party DS (2007), Nintendo Life's Dave Letcavage wrote that it was "mostly fluff in its repetitive and lengthy design", and IGN's Scott Thompson derided it as "laughably bad".

Critics widely panned the game's emphasis on luck, especially in its minigames, which The Observer's Andy Robertson believed caused minigames to sometimes feel inconsequential. Other reviewers criticized certain game boards' reliance on luck rather than skill, with Banzai Bill's Mad Mountain being almost entirely luck-based. The absence of an online multiplayer mode was also heavily criticized, though many reviewers complimented the game's local multiplayer via Download Play, which was described as robust, quick and easy, and "where this game shines". Nevertheless, a few critics observed occasional connection issues during local multiplayer. Certain reviewers also complained of a general lack of difficulty from the game's AI, particularly during mingiames.

On the topic of aesthetics, Dave Letcavage of Nintendo Life described the visuals as "satisfactory, getting the job done without doing anything to wow", stating that the stereoscopic 3D neither added to nor interfered with any aspects of the game. Kimberly Keller of Nintendo World Report added: "The graphics are crisp and utilize 3D well, while the music fits each game and board without becoming monotonous." Keller also mentioned the game's collectibles, writing: "It's a nice touch, but it's nothing more than a mildly interesting bonus." Likewise, Kevin Schaller of GameRevolution found the collectible system "pointless" due to it mostly consisting of music tracks and character voice samples that can be heard elsewhere in the game.

=== Sales ===
Mario Party: Island Tour sold more than 132,000 units within the first week of its release in Japan, making it the best-selling 3DS title that week. As of April 9, 2014, the game had remained the best-selling title in Japan, selling an additional 47,000 copies for a total of 257,000 units. The game became a Nintendo Selects title in Europe on October 16, 2015, and in North America on March 11, 2016. As of December 31, 2021, Mario Party: Island Tour had sold 2.95 million copies worldwide, making it the 24th-best-selling game for the Nintendo 3DS.

== See also ==
- List of party video games
- List of video games featuring Mario
- 2013 in video games
