= Mario Party 2 =

1999 video game

- Packaging artwork
- Developer: Hudson Soft
- Publisher: Nintendo
- Director: Kenji Kikuchi
- Producers: Shinji Hatano; Shinichi Nakamoto
- Composers: Hironao Yamamoto; Shohei Bando; Kazuhiko Sawaguchi
- Series: Mario Party
- Platform: Nintendo 64
- Release: JP: December 17, 1999; NA: January 24, 2000; PAL: October 13, 2000
- Genre: Party
- Modes: Single-player, multiplayer

Mario Party 2 (Note: Japanese: マリオパーティ2, Hepburn: Mario Pāti Tsū) is a 1999 party video game developed by Hudson Soft and published by Nintendo for the Nintendo 64. The second game in the Mario Party series, it was released in Japan on December 17, 1999, North America on January 24, 2000, and in PAL regions on October 13, 2000. The game received mostly positive reviews from critics, who praised the improvements over the original, as well as the multiplayer and minigames, but criticized the lack of originality, while graphics received a mixed to positive response.

Mario Party 2 features six playable characters: Mario, Luigi, Princess Peach, Yoshi, Wario, and Donkey Kong from the Mario series and the original Mario Party, who can be directed as characters on various themed game boards. The objective is to earn the most stars of all players on the board; stars are obtained by purchase from a single predefined space on the game board. Each character's movement is determined by a roll of a die, with a roll from each player forming a single turn. Each turn in Mario Party 2 is followed by a minigame, which is competed to earn coins for the character, used to buy items and stars.

Mario Party 2 was followed by Mario Party 3 in 2000 and was later re-released on the Wii Virtual Console in 2010, for the Wii U Virtual Console in North America in 2016, and on the Nintendo Classics service in 2022. Content from Mario Party 2 was remastered as part of Mario Party: The Top 100 for the Nintendo 3DS, Mario Party Superstars and Super Mario Party Jamboree for the Nintendo Switch.

== Gameplay ==
The gameplay of Mario Party 2 is divided between traditional board game action (top) and a variety of mini-games that take place between turns (bottom).

Mario Party 2 is a party video game featuring six playable characters: Mario, Luigi, Yoshi, Wario, Princess Peach, and Donkey Kong. In the game's frame story, Mario and his friends create a world built from their dreams and get into a debate over who the new world would be named after. When Bowser arrives and invades the land, the group takes Toad's suggestion to name it after the "Super Star" who defeats Bowser. The gameplay is presented in the form of a traditional board game, and includes five themed game boards. A sixth board map becomes available later in the game. Mario Party 2 includes multiplayer compatibility; each game on a board map consists of four players, including at least one human player and up to four. Any character who is not controlled by a human will instead be controlled by the game as a computer-controlled character. The skill level of the computer-controlled characters can be individually adjusted between "Easy", "Medium", or "Hard". After the players and board map have been determined, the player chooses how long the board map game will last: "Lite Play" consists of 20 turns, "Standard Play" consists of 35, and "Full Play" consists of 50. Upon starting a board, players each hit a dice block to determine turn order, with the highest number going first on each turn and the lowest number going last.

The goal of Mario Party 2 is to collect the most Stars within the allotted amount of turns. Stars must be purchased from Toad with coins, which can be earned through a selection from one of 65 mini-games that is played once at the end of each turn. Each time a Star is purchased, Toad will move to a different location on the board. The first player initiates a turn by rolling a dice block that determines how many spaces they will advance on the board, ranging from one to ten spaces. Each board map has a variety of spaces. Plain blue and red spaces cause the player who lands on one to respectively gain or lose three coins; the amount of coins is doubled to six during the final five turns. Some blue spaces have hidden blocks that reward extra coins or even a star to the player who lands on them. Green "!" spaces will initiate a single-player Chance Time mini-game, in which selected characters must give or exchange coins or stars; the player who landed on the space is given three blocks to hit, determining which characters and prize will be involved. Green "?" spaces result in an event occurring on the board map; each board features different events which can help or hinder certain players. Red spaces marked with an insignia of Bowser's head will cause Bowser to appear and hinder the player's progress. When a player passes a green space marked with a bag of coins, they must deposit five coins into a "Koopa Bank"; players who land right on the space can withdraw all of the coins that have been deposited. Green spaces marked with a lightning bolt initiate a four-player Battle mini-game, in which coins are taken from the players and the winner receives the majority of the accumulated coins.

The players can obtain items for use on the board, and can each carry one at a time. If a player is carrying an item, they can use it before rolling the dice block. Items can aid the player in such ways as providing additional dice blocks or stealing another player's item. One item, the Skeleton Key, allows the player to use shortcuts located on each board map. Items can be purchased from shops on the board or won from special single-player mini-games initiated by landing on green spaces marked with a treasure chest. Aside from Toad, Baby Bowser and Boo also appear on the map. Baby Bowser will take five coins from any character who passes him. One certain item, the Bowser Bomb, will automatically transform Baby Bowser into Bowser at the end of the turn in which it was received. When this occurs, Bowser will hit three dice blocks and move the total number of spaces shown. Any character within Bowser's path will lose all of their coins. Boo can steal coins or a Star from another player on behalf of any player who passes him; stealing coins costs five coins, while stealing a Star costs 50 coins. If a player is targeted for their coins, they can limit the amount of coins that Boo steals by repeatedly tapping the A button.

After all four players have made a movement on the board, a mini-game is initiated. The type of mini-game that is played is determined based on the color of space that each player landed on. Players that have landed on a green space will be randomly assigned to "blue" or "red" status before the mini-game is selected. If all players have landed on the same color of space, a 4-player mini-game is played. Other color variations result in either a 1 vs. 3 or 2 vs. 2 mini-game. The specific mini-game is then selected via roulette. Before the mini-game's initiation, the human player(s) can review the rules and controls as well as practice the mini-game. Coins are rewarded based on the results of the mini-game, with the winner(s) receiving ten coins. Another turn is initiated following the end of a mini-game, and the process is repeated until the allotted number of turns have been completed.

During the final five turns of a game, a one-on-one Duel mini-game is initiated when a player lands on the same space as another. Duels can be initiated prior to the final five turns if a player uses the Dueling Glove item. After the end of the last turn, the winners of three awards are announced, with each winner receiving one additional Star; the first two awards are given to the player(s) who collected the most coins in mini-games and throughout the board map game, and the third is given to the player(s) who landed on the most "?" spaces. The winner of the game, the "Super Star", is then determined by the number of total coins and Stars collected by each player. If two or more characters have acquired the same amount of coins and Stars, the winner will be determined with a roll of the dice block. If the player toggles the "No Bonus" setting prior to the start of a game, the hidden blocks will be omitted from the board, and the extra awards will not be presented at the end of the game.

=== Other modes ===
The game's main menu includes a "Coin Box" at which coins received by the human player during gameplay are deposited. Coins can be used to purchase mini-games from the tree Woody, which can then be played at any time outside of normal board games. After a set number of mini-games have been purchased from Woody, two modes become available for play: the multiplayer Mini-Game Stadium and the single-player Mini-Game Coaster. In the Mini-Game Stadium, four players compete on a special board map consisting only of blue and red spaces. Coins are neither gained nor lost from these spaces, and coins are only earned by winning mini-games. The winner of Mini-Game Stadium is determined by whoever accumulates the highest number of coins by the completion of the allotted turns. In the Mini-Game Coaster, one human player must play through each mini-game. The player has three lives and progresses through a world map with the completion of each mini-game, while losing a mini-game results in the loss of a life. If the player loses all lives, the game ends, and the player must resume from the last save point. If the player completes all the mini-games in Mini-Game Coaster, a bonus mini-game is unlocked.

== Development and release ==
Mario Party 2 was developed by Hudson Soft and published by Nintendo. Development was underway as of July 1999, several months after the release of the original Mario Party game. A playable demo of the game was unveiled at Nintendo Space World in August 1999. The game was 70 percent complete at that time. Mini-games that involve rotating the control stick, as in the original Mario Party, are not present in this installment due to potential injuries, such as blisters, from rotating the stick too quickly; this was the subject of a lawsuit in the case of the first game.

In Japan, Mario Party 2 was released for the Nintendo 64 on December 17, 1999. It received a U.S. release the following month, on January 24, 2000. Shortly before its U.S. release, Nintendo donated copies of the game to the Latin American Youth Center.

In Japan, Mario Party 2 was re-released in November 2010, as a downloadable Virtual Console game for the Wii. The following month, it was released for the Virtual Console in North America and Europe. In North America, Mario Party 2 was re-released as a Virtual Console game for the Wii U on December 22, 2016. The game was re-released on November 2, 2022, via the Nintendo Classics service.

== Reception ==
Reception

Aggregate score
Aggregator	Score
GameRankings	76%

Review scores
Publication	Score
AllGame	4/5
Consoles +	90%
Edge	7/10
Electronic Gaming Monthly	8.25/10
Game Informer	5.25/10
GameFan	79%
GamePro	5/5
GameRevolution	C−
GameSpot	7.8/10
Hyper	80/100
IGN	7.9/10; 8/10 (re-release)
N64 Magazine	87%
Next Generation	3/5
Nintendo Life	8/10 (re-release)
Nintendo Power	8/10
Official Nintendo Magazine	91% (N64); 82% (WII)
Superjuegos	95/100
Video Games (DE)	76% (Note: Mario Party 2 was scored by Video Games 69% for single player, and 83% for multi-player.)
Gamecenter	7/10

Mario Party 2 received a 76% score on the review aggregation website GameRankings. Some critics praised the game's new features, particularly the mini-games. However, some critics who disliked the original game were also critical of the sequel, despite the improvements. Some critics believed the graphics were an improvement over the previous game, while others considered the graphics to be largely the same as before.

Scott Alan Marriott of AllGame wrote that Mario Party 2 "does what a sequel is supposed to do: address the original's shortcomings while offering enough enhancements to make even the jaded among us take a second look." Marriott concluded, "When the books are closed on the Nintendo 64, it will be the multi-player aspect that players will remember most about the system, and Mario Party 2 ranks as one of the system's best."

GamePro stated that the game was not fun unless playing with friends. GameRevolution wrote, "If you try to play by yourself or with a friend, the computer will take charge of the other two/three players. This means you'll find yourself staring blankly at the screen as the computer takes its turn." Peyton Gaudiosi of Gamecenter wrote that playing alone "is as subpar as that in the first game thanks to its repetitive turn-based nature."

GameRevolution stated that the game, like its predecessor, relied too much on random luck. Levi Buchanan of GameFan believed that the mini-games were not as good as those in the first Mario Party, and also stated that the game's new features "actually detract from what I consider the selling point of the original Mario Party: its simplicity." Joe Fielder of GameSpot said the game has much more replay value than the previous game. He also praised the variety of mini-games and wrote "even the worst of the minigames is endurable." Matt Casamassina of IGN said that while the game had more content, and it "sticks with the same winning formula... there really isn't enough new here to warrant another purchase".

Michael Wolf reviewed the Nintendo 64 version of the game for Next Generation, rating it three stars out of five, and stated that "This does exactly what it sets out to do – provide four players with a simple but fun board game and entertaining mini-games."

Several critics wrote positively of the Wii re-release. Chris Scullion of Official Nintendo Magazine UK called it "arguably the best in the series", writing, "It's packed with fun mini-games and keeps the boards simple, rather than the convoluted messes that eventually emerged over the course of the Mario Party series." Corbie Dillard of Nintendo Life stated, "There's just something about the simple fun of Mario Party 2 that makes it so difficult to put down at times", but wrote, "It's definitely a game you'll want to have extra players on hand for, as the game can be a bit tedious sometimes as a solo experience." Lucas M. Thomas of IGN praised the re-release but noted that it was only compatible with the GameCube controller or the Classic Controller.

Retrospectively, the game has been called by some critics as one of the best games in the series, calling it vastly superior to the original game and citing its many gameplay improvements over the first game, the addition of a new item system, new minigame modes, and introducing several new game boards with unique themes and gimmicks as contributing to a memorable experience. Additionally, Mario Party 2 was the highest rated favorite game in Mario Party Superstars in-game statistics.

According to PC Data, Mario Party 2 sold 700,000 units in 2000.

== See also ==
- List of Nintendo 64 games
- List of party video games
- List of video games featuring Mario
- 1999 in video games
