= MP10 =

MP10, MP 10, or MP-10 may refer to:

- MP 10, a zone during the Eocene epoch
- Mario Party 10, a 2015 Wii U video game
- Heckler & Koch MP5/10, an MP5 submachine gun clone
