= Mario Party 6 =

2004 video game

- North American box art
- Developer: Hudson Soft
- Publisher: Nintendo
- Director: Shuichiro Nishiya
- Producers: Atsushi Ikeda; Hiroshi Sato
- Composers: Hironobu Yahata; Shinya Outouge
- Series: Mario Party
- Platform: GameCube
- Release: JP: November 18, 2004; NA: December 6, 2004; EU: March 18, 2005; AU: September 15, 2005
- Genre: Party
- Modes: Single-player, multiplayer

Mario Party 6 (Note: Japanese: マリオパーティ6, Hepburn: Mario Pāti Shikkusu) is a 2004 party video game developed by Hudson Soft and published by Nintendo for the GameCube. It is the sixth installment in the Mario Party series, the third title in the series for the GameCube, and the first GameCube game to make use of a microphone add-on. The game was released in Japan on November 18, 2004, in North America on December 6, 2004, in Europe on March 18, 2005, and in Australia on September 15, 2005.

Mario Party 6 received mixed reviews from critics, with praise for the day-and-night system, game boards, and minigames, but criticism for the microphone feature and its perceived lack of originality.

Mario Party 6 was succeeded by Mario Party Advance for the Game Boy Advance in 2005. The next home console game in the series, Mario Party 7, was released for the GameCube the same year.

== Gameplay ==
Mario battling Luigi, Princess Peach, and Yoshi in the "Verbal Assault" minigame

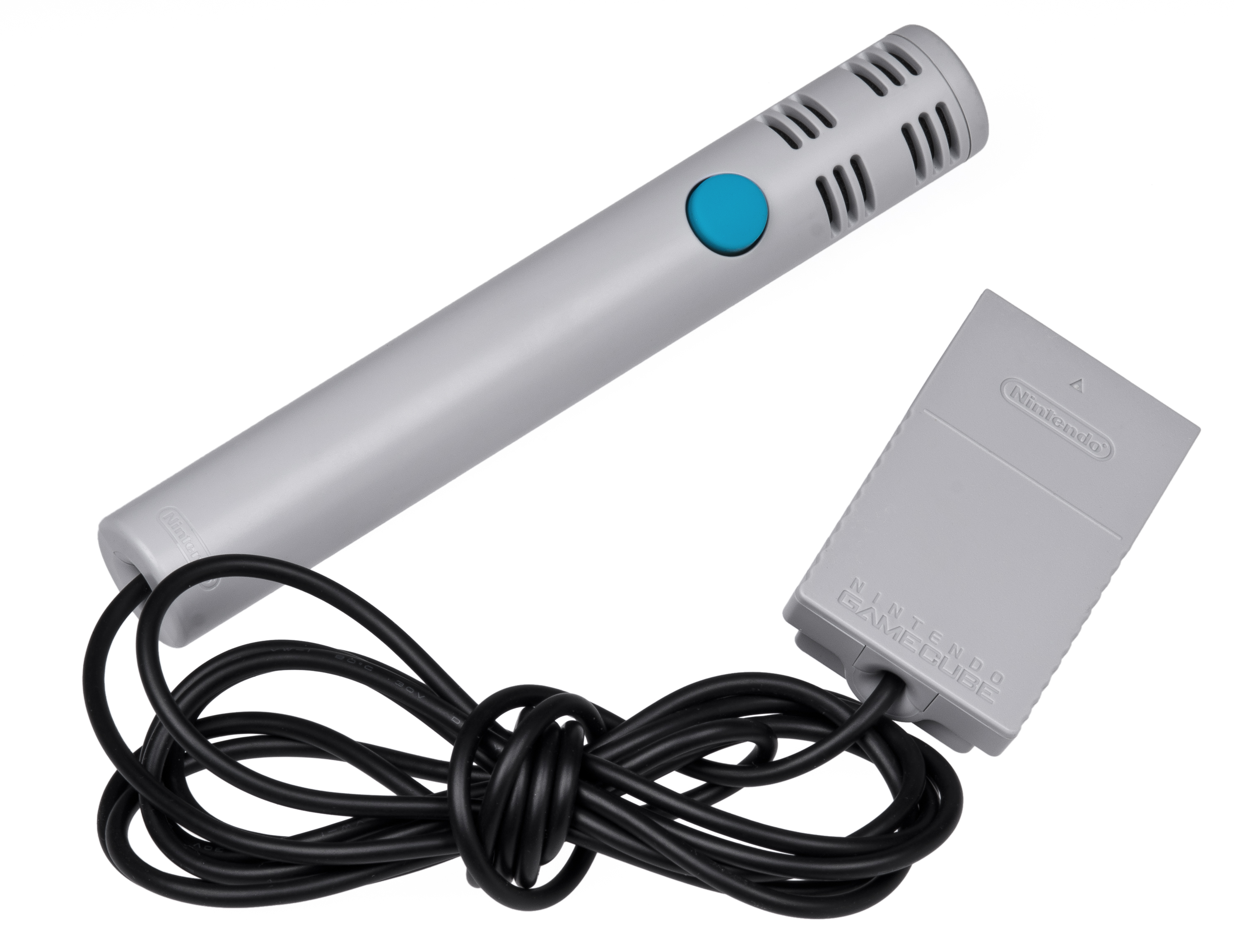
Mario Party 6 was the first game to make use of the GameCube Microphone.

In Mario Party 6, up to four players take turns moving on board game-style stages, often playing multiplayer minigames to earn coins and stars. The object of the game is to amass the most coins and stars before completing a set number of turns. This is the first game to take out the coin bonus star, replacing it with the Orb star, which is awarded to the player that used the most Orbs. On multiplayer game boards, the sun will periodically set or rise (every three turns), producing different effects. Changes include spaces moving, different characters appearing, and changes to minigames. This is reflected in two new characters, Brighton and Twila, representing the sun and moon, respectively.

All 10 playable characters from Mario Party 5 return in this game: Mario, Luigi, Princess Peach, Princess Daisy, Wario, Waluigi, Toad, Yoshi, Koopa Kid, and Boo. Toadette is also playable as a newcomer. There are 82 minigames in total.

In the game's frame story, Brighton and Twila, the sun and the moon who watch over the Mario Party world, argue over who is more popular. Mario suggests they collect as many Stars as possible to end this.

Mario Party 6 features "Orbs"—items players can either collect on the board or buy with coins at Orb Huts. Some uses of Orbs include stealing coins from opposing players, placing a mark on a space that causes opposing players who land on it to pay the player who placed the mark, or moving the player character directly to the star. Orbs are categorized into the following types: Self, Space, Roadblock, and Special. Roadblock type Orbs are one-use only and trigger when passed by an opposing player. Space type Orbs transform a space into a character space which rewards the player or allies with 5 coins and harms opposing players who land on it. Self type Orbs, unlike the other types are used on the player themself—granting benefits such as additional Dice Blocks. Special Orbs are used automatically to protect players' coins or stars from being stolen from Pink Boo, Chain Chomp, and occurrences exclusive to certain boards. In Mario Party 5, they were called capsules. Mario Party 6 completely overhauled the capsule system from the previous game in the series. In Mario Party 5 capsules could only be obtained from the free-to-use capsule machines—but costed coins to use. Finally, capsules exclusively could be placed on a space, i.e. they all functioned like the "Space" Orb type.

Solo Mode is where a single player embarks on a special single-row board with a set number of spaces to collect minigames. The player may also choose a teammate (for 2 vs 2 minigames). Also the player plays minigames with the computer-controlled Red, Green, and Blue Koopa Kids. The dice block for Solo Mode only has the numbers 1–6 on it, unlike Party Mode where the dice blocks have numbers ranging from 1–10. At the end of the board, there is an exclusive rare minigame space, where the player receives a rare minigame without needing to play it. If the player goes past the rare minigame space, they fall off the board and lose all of the minigames they have acquired. To win, the player must land on the rare minigame space, or quit (without getting a rare minigame).

There are 82 minigames in Mario Party 6. No minigames from the previous installments of this series return. New to this edition are mic and rare minigames. In mic minigames, players must say words into the GameCube microphone to perform different actions. The majority of rare games are usually obtained by stopping on the space at the end of Solo Mode, although one is purchased in the Star Bank. The minigames are divided into 4-player, 1-vs.-3, 2-vs.-2, Battle, Duel, DK, Bowser, Mic and Rare.

== Development ==
Mario Party 6 was first announced at E3 2004, though no details were provided aside from the title of the game. Due to Mario Party 6 and Mario Party Advance initially being scheduled for release on the same date, GameSpot's Chris Kohler speculated that there could be interconnected gameplay between the titles.

== Reception ==
=== Critical response ===
Reception

Aggregate score
Aggregator	Score
Metacritic	71/100

Review scores
Publication	Score
1Up.com	B
Electronic Gaming Monthly	6/10, 6.5/10, 8/10
Eurogamer	4/10
Game Informer	6.25/10
GamePro	4.5/5
GameRevolution	C
GameSpot	6.9/10
GameSpy	4/5
GamesRadar+	70%
IGN	7/10
Nintendo Power	3.8/5
Nintendo World Report	7.5/10
Detroit Free Press	3/4
The Sydney Morning Herald	2.5/5

The game received "mixed or average" reviews, according to the review aggregation website Metacritic. GameSpot cited great family and multiplayer fun, but criticized the game for having the same ideas of older Mario Party games. IGN criticized the game's lack of originality and the microphone.

Retrospectively, the game has been cited by some critics as one of the best games in the series, citing the day-and-night system as an innovation that sets Mario Party 6 apart from other games in the series.

During the 8th Annual Interactive Achievement Awards, the Academy of Interactive Arts & Sciences nominated Mario Party 6 for "Console Children's Game of the Year".

=== Sales ===
Mario Party 6 sold 1.63 million copies, making it the worst-selling home console Mario Party game and the 15th best-selling game for the GameCube.

== See also ==
- List of GameCube games
- List of party video games
- List of video games featuring Mario
- 2004 in video games
