= Mario Party =

Video game series

- Logo used since 2021
- Genres: Party, digital tabletop
- Developers: Hudson Soft (1998–2007); Capcom (Arcade); NDcube/Nintendo Cube (2012–present)
- Publisher: Nintendo
- Creator: Shigeru Miyamoto
- Platforms: Nintendo 64; GameCube; Game Boy Advance; Wii; Nintendo DS; Nintendo 3DS; Wii U; Nintendo Switch; Nintendo Switch 2
- First release: Mario Party; December 18, 1998
- Latest release: Super Mario Party Jamboree; October 17, 2024

Mario Party (Note: Japanese: マリオパーティ, Hepburn: Mario Pāti) is a series of party video games owned by Nintendo. It features characters from the Mario franchise in which up to four local players or computer-controlled characters compete in a board game interspersed with minigames. The series is known for its party game elements, including the often unpredictable multiplayer game modes that allow play with up to four, and sometimes eight, human players or CPUs.

The series was originally developed by Hudson Soft, from Mario Party in 1998 to Mario Party DS in 2007. Capcom would also make arcade games around this time. Starting from 2010, several of Hudson's key designers left to work for Nintendo subsidiary Nd Cube, where they would develop Wii Party. Starting with Mario Party 9 in 2012, they have taken over as the main developer of the series.

The series received generally favourable reception in the beginning, but as it progressed, the reception became more mixed until Super Mario Party in 2018, where it improved. The series holds the record for the longest-running minigame series. As of March 2025, Nintendo reported that the series has sold over 84 million copies.

== Gameplay ==
The gameplay of Mario Party combines traditional board game action (left) with a variety of minigames (right).

Mario Party is a series of virtual board games in which players compete in a combination of turn-based board game action and a variety of minigames. Players select from a roster of Mario characters and play on one of several themed boards, each with unique layouts and interactive elements. A game lasts a set number of turns, usually 20, 40, or 60. The objective is to collect the most stars (and secondarily coins) by the game's end. Stars are typically purchased, won through events, or stolen from other players. At the game's end, bonus stars are awarded to those fulfilling certain conditions, such as winning the most minigames or moving the most spaces.

On each turn, the players roll a die to determine their movement. Landing on different spaces triggers events; blue spaces reward coins, while red spaces detract them. Special spaces trigger dynamic elements on the map that may help or hinder the player. Spaces sporting Bowser's insignia summon him, usually invoking a penalty on the player. Items, usually in the form of capsules or orbs, can be bought from shops, or randomly collected from gumball machines in the case of Mario Party 5. The player can use items to gain extra dice rolls, unlock closed areas, set traps, or teleport to the star space. Mario Party 6 features a day-night cycle that changes gameplay elements every three turns, while Mario Party 7 features a "Bowser Time" mechanic in which Bowser triggers major disruptions every five turns. The boards of Mario Party: Island Tour feature specific win conditions, such as being the first to reach the end or collecting the most items. In Mario Party 9 and 10, the four players move in a shared vehicle along a linear path.

After every full round (or on specific spaces), the players enter a minigame, which may be played as a 4-player free-for-all, in 2-versus-2 teams, in a 1-versus-3 setup, or as a duel. The minigames range from button-mashing or joystick-twirling to more skill-based challenges. Mario Party 8 features minigames using motion controls. The winners of the minigame receive coins, while the losers either get nothing or pay out. The amount of minigames in a given game range from 56 in Mario Party to 112 in Super Mario Party Jamboree. The games often feature dedicated modes for the minigames, allowing them to be played without the board game context.

The gameplay modes of Mario Party include a standard free-for-all game and a single-player campaign against computer-controlled opponents. Mario Party 3 includes a Duel mode, in which two players use a selection of up to two partners to attack their opponent and deplete their health. Bonus modes in the GameCube titles include a card-based variant without minigames, beach volleyball and ice hockey games, and microphone-based challenges. Mario Party 10 features "Bowser Party", a 1v4 mode in which a fifth player controls Bowser with the Wii U GamePad and pursues the other four players, challenging them in minigames if he catches up.

== Games ==
Release timeline Main series in bold
1998	**Mario Party**
1999	**Mario Party 2**
2000	**Mario Party 3**
2001
2002	**Mario Party 4**
2003	Mario Party -e
2003	**Mario Party 5**
2004	**Mario Party 6**
2005	Mario Party Advance
2005	**Mario Party 7**
2006
2007	**Mario Party 8**
2007	Mario Party DS
2008
2009
2010
2011
2012	**Mario Party 9**
2013	Mario Party: Island Tour
2014
2015	**Mario Party 10**
2016	Mario Party: Star Rush
2017	Mario Party: The Top 100
2018	**Super Mario Party**
2019
2020
2021	**Mario Party Superstars**
2022
2023
2024	**Super Mario Party Jamboree**
2025	Super Mario Party Jamboree - Nintendo Switch 2 Edition + Jamboree TV

=== 1998–2000: Nintendo 64 ===
Mario Party is the first in the series. It was released in 1998 and 1999 for the Nintendo 64. Its roster of playable characters includes Mario, Luigi, Princess Peach, Donkey Kong (referred to as DK in-game), Yoshi, and Wario. It features 50 minigames, ten of which are single-player-only. Mario Party's standard game mode, Party Mode, lets up to four players play on a board interspersed with minigames. The game features eight different boards with varying difficulties. It is hosted by Toad, who guides the characters on their journeys throughout each board. In addition to the standard Party Mode, the game also features a single-player mode called Mini-Game Island, where the player's goal is to navigate an island and beat all 50 minigames as supplied. The player starts with four lives and loses a life every time they fail at a minigame. Winning a minigame gives the player coins, and collecting 100 coins grants the player one additional life. Mario Party also features Rumble Pak support, which lets players know when their turn has started. Upon completing Mini-Game Island, a Bumper Ball Maze is awarded, a single-player minigame playable in the Mini-Game House. The player can unlock two additional Bumper Ball Mazes by completing all 50 minigames in Mini-Game Island and, respectively, setting new time records in the first two Bumper Ball Mazes.

Mario Party 2 is the sequel to Mario Party and was released in 1999 and 2000 for the Nintendo 64. While Mario Party 2 is similar to the original game, it introduced a variety of new gameplay elements, such as collectible items that players can buy from item shops and three new minigame types: "Battle", "Item", and "Duel". Toad returns as the host in Mario Party 2. The game also has 15 more minigames than the original game, with a total of 65 minigames (or 88 if one counts the different courses in some of the minigames). Mario Party 2 features the same characters as the original game with no additions; however, each character dresses according to the theme of the board. Mario Party 2 is the only Mario Party game where this occurs. Mario Party 2 does not reuse any of the original game's boards but does have references to them and reuses some of their gimmicks in the new boards. Mario Party 2 features a mode called Mini-Game Land, where players can buy minigames that the player can play freely from a tree character called Woody.

Mario Party 3 was released in 2000 and 2001 for the Nintendo 64. It features the same cast of playable characters as the previous two games with the addition of Princess Daisy and Waluigi. The most notable difference in this game compared to the previous two games in the series is that each player can hold up to three items instead of only one. It also has 71 minigames, compared to Mario Party 2's 65. Mario Party 3's story revolves around a new character called the Millennium Star, who replaces Toad as the host. Like Mario Party 2, the game features all new boards, with some boards referencing the boards of the previous game and reusing their gimmicks. Mario Party 3 is also the first game in the series to feature a single-player story campaign. The game's story mode features "battle royal" boards and "duel" boards, where players fight one another for items called "Star Stamps".

=== 2002–2007: GameCube, Game Boy Advance, Wii, and Nintendo DS ===
Mario Party 4 is the first game in the series to appear on a console other than the Nintendo 64. Mario Party 4 was released for the GameCube in 2002. Mario Party 4 features the same roster of playable characters as Mario Party 3 and does not feature any new playable characters. It does, however, feature a new team battle system that allows players to team up in pairs in Party Mode, the standard game mode of the series. This game was the last game to feature Donkey Kong as a playable character up until Mario Party 10 for the Wii U. Instead of the Millennium Star, Mario Party 4 features multiple hosts, including Toad and a Koopa Troopa. The game also featured 60 new minigames. Mario Party 4 is the first Mario Party game to include side-collectibles, which are in the form of presents. It also introduces the ability for players to create their own custom minigame packs. Elements introduced in the previous game also return, such as the ability for players to team up in Party Mode and the ability to hold up to three items at a time. Mario Party 4 is also the first game in the series to feature boards fully rendered in 3D, although the navigational board space layout remained 2D until Mario Party 5.

Mario Party-e is a card game that makes optional use of the Nintendo e-Reader and was released on February 18, 2003. Developed by indieszero, It is the only Mario Party game for the Nintendo e-Reader. Many of these cards contain "dot-codes" that, when scanned into the e-Reader, allow players to play minigames similar to those found in the regular Mario Party series. The Mario Party-e set contains a Play Mat, an instruction book and a pre-constructed deck consisting of sixty-four cards. An extra card was included as a promotion in an issue of GamePro.

Mario Party 5 was released in 2003 for the GameCube. It features the same playable character roster as the previous two instalments with the exclusion of Donkey Kong and addition of Toad, Boo, and Koopa Kid. Rather than Mario Party 4's large number of hosts, Mario Party 5 features the Star Spirits, known as the Star Guards in this game, who first appeared in the 2000 Paper Mario for the Nintendo 64. The game also features 78 new minigames. One of the most major changes that Mario Party 5 made to the series was replacing collectible items with "capsules" (called "orbs" in later games), which players receive from a capsule machine, a talking robot vending machine that gives the player passing it a random capsule at no charge of coins, on the board. In addition to giving the player who uses it an advantage over the other players, capsules can also allow the player to set up traps for other players by throwing them at a space in front of them. These traps include forcing the player who lands on the capsule space to only be able to roll numbers from one to five on the Dice Block or forcing them to move ten spaces forward on the board. Mario Party 5 also introduces a new mode, Super Duel Mode. This mode is a one-versus-one battle mode where two players face off against each other using custom-assembled vehicles (called "machines" in-game). In this mode, players buy machine parts using points—awarded by playing minigames in either Party Mode or Minigame Mode—and build battle machines to use in different tournaments. There are a total of 44 different parts that can be used to customize a vehicle. To unlock all the parts, the player must play all the tournaments and beat certain opponents.

Mario Party 6 was released in 2004 and 2005 for the GameCube. It is the first game in the series to make use of the GameCube's microphone peripheral that was packaged with the game. It features the same cast of playable characters as the previous game with the addition of Toadette, although she has to be unlocked by buying her for thirty stars in the Star Bank, a place in the game where one player can trade stars for prizes and other valuables, including new difficulty levels and rare minigames. Mario Party 6 features two new characters as its hosts: Brighton and Twila, who depict the sun and the moon, respectively. It also featured 82 new minigames. This marked the last appearance of the "autoplay" function where the game plays itself in Party Mode. Mario Party 6 is famous for its introduction of a day–night cycle system implemented for boards and minigames. This is a concept that had previously only been seen in Horror Land, a board in Mario Party 2. Mario Party 6 is the first and only game in the series to feature a day–night cycle system for all boards and minigames.

Mario Party Advance was released for the Game Boy Advance in 2005. It was the first Mario Party game for a handheld console and was the only Mario Party game for the Game Boy Advance. It features four playable characters: Mario, Luigi, Princess Peach, and Yoshi. The hosts of the game are Tumble, Toad, Professor Elvin Gadd, and Toadette. Its antagonists are Bowser and three of his children: Blue Koopa Kid, Green Koopa Kid, and Red Koopa Kid. Its standard mode is "Shroom City", in which the player takes control of one of the playable characters and travels around the city Shroom City, completing quests and collecting minigames and "Gaddgets" to play in other modes.

Mario Party 7 was released in 2005 and 2006 for the GameCube. It was the series' last instalment on the GameCube. The microphone integration returns from the previous game, and the game introduces a new mode that allows up to eight players to play together. It features the same roster of playable characters with the exclusion of Koopa Kid and the addition of Birdo and Dry Bones as unlockable characters. Toadette is now unlocked from the start. Rather than Mario Party 6's Brighton and Twila, Toadsworth, who first appeared in the 2002 GameCube game Super Mario Sunshine, is the host of Mario Party 7. The game also features 88 new minigames.

Mario Party 8 was the first Mario Party game for the Wii, released in 2007. It was also the last home-console game in the series to be developed by Hudson Soft, before NDcube took over the games' development starting from the next game in the series. The game features 73 new minigames, most of which utilize the motion control capabilities of the Wii Remote. Mario Party 8 features all the characters from the last game with the addition of Blooper and Hammer Bro. Players can also play as their Mii character in certain modes. The game features new items called "candies", which replace "capsules", or "orbs", from the last three games in the series. These items are found throughout the boards and can be collected by players to aid themselves or hinder the progress of opponents. Positive effects range from getting to roll two dice blocks instead of one to getting to move to another player's board space. Other candies may let players steal stars from opponents or change the position of other player characters on the board. The game's story revolves around a ringmaster, named MC Ballyhoo, and his talking hat, Big Top. After inviting Mario and his friends to a carnival, called the Star Carnival, Ballyhoo promises that whoever wins is crowned the Superstar and receives a year's supply of candy. This begins the board games. Mario Party 8 takes use of the Wii Remote's motion control features, allowing the player to wave it, point and shoot, and more during minigames. In addition to the standard Party Mode, the game also features a single-player mode called Star Battle Arena, where the player can compete with a computer-controlled character on boards and in minigames.

Mario Party DS was released in 2007 for the Nintendo DS. It was the first and only Mario Party game for the Nintendo DS. It was also the last game in the series overall to be developed by Hudson Soft. It featured 73 minigames, many of which took use of the Nintendo DS's touchscreen, microphone, and unique dual screen capabilities, in addition to traditional-style minigames using the D-pad and buttons. The game features Mario, Luigi, Peach, Daisy, Wario, Waluigi, Yoshi, and Toad as playable characters.

=== 2012–present: Nintendo Cube ===
Mario Party 9 was released in 2012 for the Wii. It was the first game in the series to be developed by NDcube instead of Hudson Soft, who developed all the previous Mario Party games. The game's playable character roster consists of the same characters as in the previous game with the exclusion of Toadette, Boo, Dry Bones, Blooper, and Hammer Bro; and the addition of Koopa Troopa, Shy Guy, and Magikoopa, named "Kamek" in the PAL version of the game. The game features 82 new minigames. Replacing MC Ballyhoo and Big Top as the hosts of the game is Yellow Toad, who hosts the board games, and Blue Toad, who hosts the minigames. A green Toad also appears near the end of board games to initiate an event similar to the "Last Five Turns Event" from past Mario Party games. Mario Party 9 also introduces the Mini Stars and Mini Ztars. Mini Stars are small white stars that the characters need to obtain in order to advance on each board. Mini Ztars are the counterpart to Mini Stars, being small, dark, and purple stars that cause a player to lose as many Mini Stars as the amount of Mini Ztars they collected. The most notable feature that Mario Party 9 introduced to the series was the car mechanic. In Mario Party 9 and Mario Party 10, every player navigates the board in a car rather than move independently of one another. Mario Party 9 has a lesser focus on strategy, and its minigames do not impact the board game in ways that the previous Mario Party games did. Critics heavily censured the car mechanic; Destructoid noted, "An over-reliance on random chance over strategy can quickly derail the experience when things go awry at the worst possible time ..." In an interview with Nintendo Life, Shuichiro Nishiya, a game redirector from NDcube, said in relation to the car mechanic, "In past instalments, everyone would move separately through the board. As a result, the actions of the other players often didn't affect you. You could just look at the TV screen when it was your turn and during the minigames." He further noted, "In Mario Party 10, though, players move together in a car, so each player's action will affect the others, meaning you'll need to keep an eye on the TV screen."

Mario Party: Island Tour was the first Mario Party game for the Nintendo 3DS, released in 2013 and 2014. It features 81 minigames, many of which utilize the 3DS's touch screen and dual screen capabilities, as well as the system's other unique features. It features Mario, Luigi, Peach, Daisy, Wario, Waluigi, Yoshi, Boo, Toad, and Bowser Jr. as playable characters. It was the first Mario Party game to feature Bowser Jr. as a playable character.

Mario Party 10 was released in 2015 for the Wii U. It was the only Mario Party game for the system, and most of the playable characters from the previous game return, although Birdo, Koopa Troopa, Shy Guy, and Magikoopa are removed. The game does, however, introduce Rosalina, Spike, and Bowser (playable in the Bowser Party mode) as playable characters for the first time in the series and additionally re-introduces Donkey Kong, who had not been in a Mario Party game since Mario Party 4, and Toadette. The game also introduced two new modes: Bowser Mode and amiibo Party. It also re-introduces the car mechanic from the previous game, where players navigate the board together in a car rather than move individually as seen in older games in the series. In Mario Party 10, the game's standard board game mode is called "Mario Party". In this mode, players compete to get the most Mini Stars, as in previous games. In the game's new Bowser Party mode, one player controls Bowser using the primary controller for the Wii U, the Wii U GamePad, and up to four other players control Mario and his friends using Wii Remotes. In this mode, Mini Stars are replaced by hearts, which serve as the players' health points. The goal of the player playing as Bowser is to deplete the health of the players in Team Mario, while the goal of the other players is to reach the Super Star at the end of the board with at least one player with at least one heart remaining. If Bowser catches up to Team Mario, every player has to play a randomly-selected "Bowser Battle" minigame, where the hearts of players on Team Mario are lost if they are hit by Bowser's attacks. If Team Mario's players lose all their hearts, Bowser wins. The game also introduces the amiibo Party mode. In this mode, up to four players can scan the amiibo for a character and play as that character on small boards. Players compete for the most stars, which can be bought with coins. Rather than traditional characters, the players control amiibo figures of the characters whose amiibo they scanned. If a player does not own an amiibo figure, they play as a cardboard cutout as a character instead.

Mario Party: Star Rush was the second Mario Party game for the Nintendo 3DS. Released in 2016 and 2017, the game was the first Mario Party game on a handheld console to be compatible with amiibo figures. The game features Mario, Luigi, Princess Peach, Princess Daisy, Wario, Waluigi, Yoshi, Toad, Toadette, Rosalina, Donkey Kong, and Diddy Kong as playable characters. Blue Toad, Yellow Toad, Red Toad, and Green Toad are also playable in the "Toad Scramble" mode, the standard game mode of Star Rush. The Additionally, Bowser, Bowser Jr., and Boo can be played as by tapping their amiibo figures in the "Mario Shuffle" mode. The only character that is not available in the "Mario Shuffle" mode is Toadette. Mario Party: Star Rush has a total of 53 minigames. In the game's main mode, Toad Scramble, up to four players start out with a Toad, where their colour corresponds to each player. The goal of the mode is to amass the most stars; players can retrieve stars by placing first in the boss minigames. Players can battle bosses by landing on the space in front of them on the board, and every time a boss minigame is completed, a new boss appears on the board at a different spot. Up to five bosses may appear on a board. In the Mario Shuffle mode, two players race across a linear, one-way board to a goal as amiibo figures. The red team's goal is to reach the very right of the board, while the blue team's goal is to reach the left side. Players roll two dice each, and when a player crosses an opponent's amiibo figure, the player knocks it back to the start of the board. Players can land on spaces that either make their figure continue moving farther on the board or move backwards. If players do not have an amiibo figure, a cardboard cut-out of a character is used instead. A total amount of six characters can be used, each split into two teams of three. The first team who makes it across the board to their goal wins the game. Star Rush also features five other game modes: Coinathlon, Balloon Bash, Rhythm Recital, Challenge Tower, and Boo's Block Party. In Coinathlon, up to four players collect as many coins as they can in a set of three sixty-second coin-designated minigames. In Balloon Bash, up to four players collect coins and stars while rolling the Dice Block on a small board with 10, 20, or 30 turns and minigames. In Rhythm Recital, up to four players cooperate and play classic Mario tunes by timing touchscreen taps button presses correctly. In Challenge Tower, a single-player mode, the player climbs a tower with LED spaces on it, trying to hit the right colours and avoid Amp enemies. And finally, in the Boo's Block Party mode, a puzzle game, players spin the sides of numbered blocks to match them up for points. Star Rush also features the Character Museum, which lets players view characters and their biographies, similar to the trophy system in the Super Smash Bros. games.

Mario Party: The Top 100 was the third Mario Party game for the Nintendo 3DS, released in 2017. Unlike traditional Mario Party games, The Top 100 is a compilation of 100 remade minigames originally featured in the previous ten home console games in the series. It features Mario, Luigi, Princess Peach, Princess Daisy, Wario, Waluigi, Yoshi, and Rosalina as playable characters. The Top 100 has the most minigames out of all games in the Mario Party series. The main game mode of The Top 100 is 100 Minigames, where players can play all 100 minigames individually, outside of a board. Its second mode, Minigame Island, is a single-player mode, where Toad is the host. After the player selects their character, they can choose a computer-controlled teammate for two-versus-two minigames. The game's third mode is Minigame Match, which serves as the game's only board game mode. It plays similarly to Balloon Bash from the previous instalment, Star Rush. It is a multiplayer mode where players travel around a small board and roll a Dice Block that determines their movement on the board. In this mode, players need to pop "Star Balloons" across the board; collecting stars is vital to winning the game. The Top 100's next game mode, Championship Battles, is one hosted by Toadette and has players battling other players in random minigames from a "minigame pack", a concept first introduced in Mario Party 4. Whichever player receives the best of three or five rounds wins the mode. The Top 100's final mode, Decathlon, has players play either five or ten minigames against other players. The player earns points depending on how well they played the minigame, rather than whether they won, and the score in the minigame converts to points to the overall score in the mode.

Super Mario Party was released in 2018 for the Nintendo Switch. The game features the second largest roster of playable characters in any Mario Party game, featuring nearly every character from Mario Party 10 (minus Spike), with the addition of Dry Bones, Goomba, Boo, Koopa Troopa, Hammer Bro, Shy Guy, Bowser Jr., Diddy Kong, Pom Pom, and Monty Mole. Additionally, Bowser, who had only previously been playable in Mario Party 10's Bowser Party and amiibo Party modes, is now playable in the standard Party Mode. Super Mario Party's most notable change is the removal of the car mechanic. In this game, players navigate the board individually like in past Mario Party instalments. The game also introduces a new mode called "Toad's Rec Room", where players can pair up two Nintendo Switch units to form a single connected board to play minigames on. Super Mario Party also introduces online multiplayer for the first time in the series. While the standard board games are restricted to the game's standard Party Mode, players are able to play the game's 80 minigames with other players either locally or online, independent of the board games, in the game's new "Online Mario-thon" mode. In this mode, players compete in five randomly-selected minigames, aiming to get the highest score. It also features leaderboards and a ranking system, as well as rewards that the players can receive for playing the mode.

On June 15, 2021, Nintendo announced Mario Party Superstars for the Nintendo Switch. It is a compilation of 100 classic mini-games and five game boards stretching all the way back to the first Mario Party on Nintendo 64, all remade with HD graphics. It includes full online compatibility for playing with both friends and strangers. The game was released on October 29, 2021.

Super Mario Party Jamboree was revealed during the June 18, 2024 Nintendo Direct, and released on October 17, 2024. It contains seven boards (two of which are returning from previous games), Jamboree Buddies, the largest playable roster with Pauline and Ninji, 112 minigames, and an online 20-player mode. Super Mario Party Jamboree - Nintendo Switch 2 Edition + Jamboree TV, an upgraded port of the game to the Nintendo Switch 2 which uses the console's support for camera, microphone and mouse controls, was released on July 24, 2025.

== Characters and premises ==
The playable characters in the Mario Party series consist of characters in the Mario franchise, with the first game featuring Mario, Luigi, Princess Peach, Yoshi, Wario, and Donkey Kong. Mario Party 3 introduces Princess Daisy and Waluigi into the playable roster. Super Mario Party Jamboree features 22 playable characters, the largest roster in the series thus far.

Bowser is a recurring antagonist in the series, usually appearing via the Bowser Spaces to cause trouble for the players, and often acting as the main villain in the games' single-player campaigns. Toad acts as a star vendor in the first two games, and becomes a playable character in Mario Party 5. Boos appear as thieves for hire who steal coins or stars on a player's behalf. Beginning in Mario Party 5, Donkey Kong is a non-player character who rewards players who land on his spaces. Some games feature unique hosts, including the Millennium Star in Mario Party 3, the Star Guards in Mario Party 5, Brighton and Twila in Mario Party 6, Toadsworth in Mario Party 7, and MC Ballyhoo and Big Top in Mario Party 8. Koopa Kid, who is added to the playable roster in Mario Party 5, features prominently in that game's story mode. The "Jamboree Buddies" mechanic of Super Mario Party Jamboree incorporates several characters from the franchise.

The games often include a frame story that provides context for the party gameplay. The first three games are driven by a competition amongst the characters, who aim to become a "Super Star" in some capacity. Mario Party 4 is a birthday celebration for the player character, who must win their presents. In Mario Party 5, the characters are invited to a land in which dreams are created and protected by star-like guardians. Mario Party 6 sees the characters stockpiling stars to settle an argument between the celestial beings Brighton and Twila. Mario Party 7 is centered on a vacation cruise hosted by Toadsworth, which an uninvited Bowser attempts to ruin. The action of Mario Party 8 takes place in the Star Carnival, in which the winner receives a year's supply of candy.

== Reception ==
=== Critical commentary ===
Aggregate review scores
Game	Year	GameRankings	Metacritic	OpenCritic
Mario Party	1998	78%	79/100	—
Mario Party 2	1999	76%	76/100	—
Mario Party 3	2000	74%	74/100	—
Mario Party 4	2002	73%	70/100	—
Mario Party 5	2003	71%	69/100	—
Mario Party 6	2004	73%	71/100	—
Mario Party Advance	2005	57%	54/100	—
Mario Party 7	2005	65%	64/100	—
Mario Party 8	2007	63%	62/100	—
Mario Party DS	2007	72%	72/100	—
Mario Party 9	2012	75%	74/100	—
Mario Party: Island Tour	2013	59%	57/100	3% recommend
Mario Party 10	2015	64%	67/100	16% recommend
Mario Party: Star Rush	2016	65%	68/100	18% recommend
Mario Party: The Top 100	2017	53%	59/100	3% recommend
Super Mario Party	2018	74%	76/100	60% recommend
Mario Party Superstars	2021	—	80/100	76% recommend
Super Mario Party Jamboree	2024	—	82/100	89% recommend

Mario Party received praise for its unique party and social elements; however, IGN criticized the slow pacing of the game and the lack of enjoyment when played alone. GameSpot said, "The games that are enjoyable to play in multi-player are nowhere near as good in the single player mode. Really, it's that multi-player competitive spark of screaming at and/or cheering for your friends that injects life into these often-simple little games, and without it, they're just simple little games." GameSpot praised Mario Party 2's minigames, noting that they were a lot more fun than those of the first game. IGN noted that the game is "more of the same" and said that the game might not be worth its price unless the buyer considers themselves a "Mario Party fanatic". IGN rated the game a 7.9 out of 10, further noting that the sequel was better than the original but that it did not "offer enough new to warrant a higher score". It recommended the game only to those who did not own the original.

Like Mario Party 2, IGN criticized Mario Party 3 for not having enough new content. It also criticized the game's new story mode, noting that the player was forced to watch computer-controlled opponents for too long and too often, even while they were playing minigames on their own. It also noted that moving around the board in this mode quickly became tedious and boring. The review author further asserted, "I think it'd be better be classified as a tutorial mode." GameSpot noted, "While pure innovation may not be king in the Mario Party world, Hudson's dedication to solid, addictive puzzle gaming that makes for a wholly enjoyable multiplayer experience is apparent." HonestGamers criticized the game's boards, noting, "They're just not much fun." It further explained, "Some of them are, to be fair." It also criticized the game's options and menus, stating that it is difficult to even begin a new game. Additionally, it censured the game's "down-to-the-wire games", stating, "it's almost impossible to keep stars you win unless you're guarding them very carefully." It further explained that mostly, a player's threat is not their human opponents but rather the computer-controlled players, describing how computer-controlled opponents will quickly steal the player's stars after they get them.

As usual, GameSpot praised the minigames of Mario Party 4. It called the game "arguably the most accomplished entry in the series yet", while further noting, "While more accomplished gamers may find some of the minigames too simplistic, this accessibility ensures that Mario's party is one that just about anyone can enjoy." It also mentioned the improved graphics of the game while further noting that the character models of the game were more simplified compared to their counterparts in Super Smash Bros. Melee, released about a year before Mario Party 4. GameRevolution also noted the game's improved visuals while explaining that they were not representative of what the GameCube can achieve and criticized the game's textures, noting that they were not greatly detailed. GameRevolution did, however, praise its "happy" music but criticized the minigames, saying, "none really stand out". IGN, however, praised the improved visuals of the game and noted, "Mario Party 4 is exactly how you would envision it on GameCube: all-new mini-games and better visuals". IGN also called the game "an absolute must-rent if you have a few friends over for the weekend" and "definitely an 'everybody' title".

Retrospectively, Mario Party-e is widely considered to be one of the worst Mario Party games by critics, with both Digital Trends and TheGamer listing it at the bottom of their rankings. TheGamer called it "An Interesting Tech Experiment, But Nothing More" and "definitely the worst Mario Party game for those looking to have a proper fun time.", while Digital Trends questioned if "Is a Mario Party game really bad if almost no one is around to play it? The answer is yes. Mario Party-e is probably a game most people never have, and never would without this list, hear about." and lambasted the game for being "more of a traditional game than a videogame" and boiling down to "playing a card game in real life and occasionally picking up your GBA to play a minigame using a card", concluding that "At this point, they might as well have just made an actual board game".

IGN praised the multiplayer elements of Mario Party 5, as usual, but criticized its "spotty" single-player mode. It called it "the perfect drinking game for college dorms ... and at the same time a great game for kids to enjoy with their siblings." It called Mario Party 5 "likely as good as mini-game party games get." GameSpot criticized how the game's graphics had not been improved from the previous game in the series and said, "the boards are looking a little bland, with some inconsistent texture quality". It further noted, "The minigames, while not terribly visually enticing, tend to do their jobs well enough, without slowdown or glaring visual faults." It also criticized the voice work for, "while generally fitting the cheery tone of the game", being "largely recycled from Mario Party 4." It also criticized its music that it noted was "almost painfully cheery tunes that are basically riffs from a few classic [Super] Mario Bros. themes." GameSpot said that it was "hard to recommend" the game to owners of the previous game in the series but recommended it to casual fans who had not already played a Mario Party game. Eurogamer called the game a "mixed bag", criticizing its music, slow pace, and lack of originality. It noted that the game "can be a laugh" if "played with the right group" but also noted, "there are far better things to do with your time, your GameCube, and such marvelously entertaining friends", saying, "Western gamers are quite right to ignore this."

IGN noted that the graphics, sound, and minigames of Mario Party 6 are "just good enough", further explaining, "But when put together, Mario Party 6 still manages to generate that glee of unexpectedly trouncing your opponent because you're the only one who knew that you used more capsules and thus deserve another star." GameSpot noted, "The fundamental formula isn't so different, but it's different enough that even if you've played all five previous Mario Party games, there's still something new for you." It further criticized the game's graphics, comparing it to Mario Power Tennis, which was released a month before Mario Party 6. It further criticized the board designs, noting, "While the board designs are new, they're no more inventive in design than what we've seen before, and they certainly don't look any better." It further criticized the game and its developer, noting, "... we can't shake the feeling that Hudson will continue riding the same graphical technology for as long as it can still sell copies."

Matt Casamassina of IGN wrote in a review for Mario Party 7, "Mario Party 7 is still entertaining, but I'd be a liar if I wrote that I'm not growing bored with new iterations of the same old formula." He further noted, "To its credit, the title delivers some fun new boards and mini-games, and the multiplayer experience is as robust and enjoyable as ever." He then went on to criticize the game's single-player mode: "But it in contrast dishes out a worthless single-player mode marred by tediously slow computer-controlled character interactions. And the overall presentation of the story, cut-scenes and real-time achievements is only passable." He called the game "a decent sequel to an aging franchise", noting, "the only people that should truly be interested in it are those dedicated to multiplayer parties. Everybody else can either make due with last year's version or avoid the series altogether." Ryan Davis of GameSpot criticized the game's lack of originality, as with previous Mario Party games, but he commended the game's new eight-player multiplayer mode, noting, "The addition of eight-player minigames is really the only new feature worth considering buying the game for, as the rest of the changes are token gestures. So it's otherwise the same old Mario Party all over again." He further declared, "this compulsive level of sameness is counterbalanced by the fact that (besides the Mario Party series) there are not a lot of other games like this on the GameCube these days—or anywhere else, for that matter." Josh Daugherty of Nintendo World Report praised its support for up to eight players and large number of minigames but censured its relatively small roster of playable characters (12), poor microphone implementation, and the long waiting times when playing with computer-controlled opponents.

IGN and GameSpot criticized Mario Party 8's lack of originality. IGN lambasted the game, citing the game's few changes from the last games in the series, slow pace, lacklustre single-player mode, and "loose attention to detail". It finally noted, "In spite of our issues with the game, people who loved Mario Party 7 will probably enjoy Mario Party 8, too, but we've chosen not to reward Nintendo with an undeserved high score for a copy/paste sequel." Similarly, GameSpot said that the game's developer, Hudson Soft, had gotten "a little too comfortable" with Mario Party being "the only persistent minigame [series] for years". It further noted, "The fact that there are more interesting minigame collections out there now, like Rayman Raving Rabbids, puts that laziness in stark relief and makes it more difficult to tolerate. If you've got the patience to dig past the skill-free board game portions of Mario Party 8, there are some genuinely inventive minigames to be played. The point, though, is that you shouldn't have to dig at all." GameSpot also criticized the game's "lacklustre presentation", noting its "garish color palette" and "stomping, blaring marching-band soundtrack". It explained that the visual fidelity of the game had not been improved in the move from the GameCube and further noted, "in some ways, it actually looks worse now." It criticized the game's aliasing and how the game would not fill a widescreen display during gameplay, instead using black borders, further describing, "It's awkward, and it's borderline embarrassing that a Nintendo-published Wii game doesn't have full widescreen support." Eurogamer noted the game's many "obvious missed opportunities", criticizing the limitation of the Mii character and how it could only be played in a few game modes. Like GameSpot, Eurogamer criticized the lack of widescreen support, lack of originality, and poor motion controls. Additionally, it criticized the game's single-player mode, calling it "so utterly wretched it scarcely warrants discussion", further noting, "To add insult to injury, you have to go through it twice to unlock the mere two extra characters." Finally, Eurogamer said, "Fun could be had here, but even with the most forgiving group of friends, it's going to be short-lived."

On Mario Party DS, IGN noted that it was "honestly very difficult to get excited for yet another Mario Party, even though it's the first time it's been made for the Nintendo DS system." It noted that Mario Party DS is "a solid multiplayer mini-game experience with a lot of the flaws of the previous versions." It further explained, "It doesn't do anything truly special than create a bunch of touch screen and microphone-centric minigames (and even then we've seen variations of them in other DS titles), but it at least comes together as a better title than the last console Mario Party design." GameSpot praised the large number of minigames and their quality, noting, "Typically, a collection like this made for the Nintendo DS will give you 20 or 30 minigames. This one has more than 70. Remarkably, despite that lofty number, there aren't many duds." It criticized the single-player mode but described the multiplayer aspect of the game as "an outright blast".

IGN called Mario Party 9 "the best Mario Party since the series reached its heights in the early GameCube days", further noting, "But throughout its many generations, Mario Party has carried a fatal flaw ...: In spite of your proficiency at mini-games, or penchant for board game strategy, [the Mario Party series] is dictated by the dice roll. Randomness, which Mario Party 9 flaunts with a particularly annoying brand of euphoric abandon, ultimately ruins what could be a very good game." GameSpot once again criticized the lack of originality. It also criticized one "problematic" minigame where the motion controls were "fussy" and "needlessly [complicated]". It complimented the game's minigames, noting that they make the game "entertaining for a few hours, and there's enough content to make it worth coming back for more"; however, it noted that it is "highly preferable to play with friends" due to the game's focus on luck rather than strategy. GameSpot also criticized the game's single-player story campaign, describing it as "[not] very engaging". It noted that each game lasts for too long and that it was unfortunate that the player is forced to beat the single-player mode to unlock the game's sixth board and two of the twelve playable characters. It finally called the game "a decent package with a lot of content, even if the Story mode is something you'll wish you could avoid." It then went on to say, "It's colorful, good looking, and fun with others, but after so many games, the appeal just isn't going to last for many people. There's no denying that what Mario Party 9 does, it largely does well; it's just that it's largely been doing it well for nine console games and two handheld games. Once you've spent a few hours with mates, seen all the different boards, and played all the minigames, there's very little incentive to return. Much like that high school reunion, it is fun for a night, but you won't have any hesitation about moving on."

IGN criticized Mario Party: Island Tour for its "mostly bland" minigames, additionally noting, "a handful are just bad." "If you've played a Mario Party game before, you'll recognize that a majority of the games are based around returning ideas", IGN said. It cited that some of the game's minigames used the Nintendo 3DS's touchscreen "effectively" but rated the game 5.5 out of 10 for its "mostly boring minigames unfortunate system-jerking motion control." GameSpot said that many of the minigames do a good job of taking advantage of the 3DS's unique features in their design but noted, "there are still some stinkers in the mix." "Strictly luck-based minigames turn up in the rotation frequently, and they're not any fun," GameSpot said. It also cited the game's "sluggish controls that hamper your ability to move well." Finally, it said, "It's not a perfect party by any means, but some good design considerations, better-than-average variety, and always-enjoyable Mario thematics put Mario Party: Island Tour a few notches above your average video game bash-in-a-box." It rated the game 7 out of 10. Nintendo Life said that winning minigames is "inconsequential ... in the grand scheme of things". It called the game's visuals "satisfactory, getting the job done without doing anything to wow." It finally noted, "The Mario Party series isn't changing much, and when it does, it doesn't seem to be for the better. The pieces of Island Tour that work the best are the ones sticking to the form established early in the series — fun, accessible mini-games that don't over-complicate things. It's the game boards that need better ideas, and the "less is more" approach would suit future instalments better. The focus on luck, swapping places at random, and — specific to this instalment — the short length all conspire to hamper what could easily have been a much more enjoyable experience. There's still a ton of rowdy multiplayer fun to be had, but it's unfortunate that a whole portion of the game is so hit-or-miss."

GameSpot and TrustedReviews criticized Mario Party 10 for being too similar to the previous games in the series. GameSpot further criticized the game's lack of strategy and cited that the game has "an annoying habit of stealing stars away from whoever is in the lead", explaining that this makes the any effort the player has put into the minigames "largely [moot]." It was also censured for keeping the car mechanic from the previous game. Den of Geek! criticized the game's new Bowser Party mode, calling it "basically a sprint to the finish line, with no depth or complexity, and one that is typically over in a handful of uneventful turns." It praised the fun minigames of the standard mode, "Mario Party" but further criticized the game, saying "it never matters whether you actually win or lose in any of the game modes", noting that most of what the game offers is already unlocked from the start. It noted that the game lacks inspiration and stated that despite the fun minigames, "everything else feels incredibly deflated" and "Bowser Party comes across as gimmicky and mundane, other modes are restricted by amiibo and controller types, and a clear 'everyone's a winner' mentality strips away any sense of challenge that could have been had here." IGN criticized the new amiibo Party mode, describing, "The integration of amiibo amounts to little more than constantly tapping the figures to a sensor in the corner of the GamePad. You tap to roll, tap to stop random spinners, tap to use items... You tap the GamePad a lot." It also criticized the minigames' infrequency, noting that in the standard game mode, "Mario Party", the players only get to play a minigame if one of them lands on a minigame board space, further noting that these spaces are rare on the boards. It did, however, praise the Bowser Party mode, calling it Mario Party 10's "greatest achievement and one of the best uses of the Wii U GamePad yet". Eurogamer noted the game's "prudent" motion controls but called the Amiibo implementation "decidedly mixed", noting that the boards are "far less dynamic", further explaining, "it's the same board repurposed slightly depending on which compatible figures you own; they look different, but are otherwise functionally similar." However, like IGN, Eurogamer praised the Bowser Party mode and called it the "unlikely champion" of the Wii U's various uses of the GamePad in games. Finally, it said, "This is, at least, in the upper echelons of the series: a little short of the Hudson Soft heyday, maybe, but better than every entry since the fifth, and certainly superior to the anemic eighth entry and the pointless handheld versions."

IGN criticized Mario Party: Star Rush, criticizing the slow pacing of the gameplay, saying, "but Mario Party: Star Rush's modes all start slow and never find ways to pick up the pace." It further criticized the board game modes for "[unfolding] nearly the same way every time." It also mentioned the luck factor of the game, noting "almost everything here hinges on luck, and there are few opportunities for sneaky plays to employ smart strategies to shift its competitive games in your favor. A lot of them boil down to roll the dice and try to make the best of what's available on the board." However, it praised the improvements to the sluggish gameplay of the previous Mario Party games and also praised the "wacky spirit" of the minigames. It did, however, end its review with "After a few trips through Mario Party: Star Rush's modes, you'll have seen nearly everything it has to offer." Nintendo Life noted that Star Rush's modes and minigames are "decent", noting, "There are some enjoyable highlights, some decent alternatives and one or two outright duds; overall the positive inclusions outweigh the weak points." It mentioned that there are a limited number of minigames in the standard mode, Toad Scramble, but noted, "they're some of the stronger examples in the game and the heat of the battle is rather addictive." It also noted that Balloon Bash is "the best mode for playing the broadest variety of minigames." It did, however, explain that the Mario Shuffle mode "feels like an odd misstep" but praised the Boo's Block Party mode. Finally, it explained, "Mario Party: Star Rush may not excel in many ways, but it addresses some complaints from past entries and delivers some harmless entertainment."

At the beginning of its review of Mario Party: The Top 100, Nintendo Life said, "Just because a game has a great concept, doesn't mean the end product will be the same." It explained that The Top 100 is "an incredible idea on paper" and cited that it is a "joy" to see the 100 classic minigames return but explained, "the rest of the package nevertheless delivers a lacklustre experience." It called it a "blast" to play the 100 returning minigames but criticized the small amount of content and the low replay value. It noted that the game accomplished remastering 100 classic minigames "with great results" and called the initial time spent playing the game "an awesome walk through nostalgia lane" but criticized the rest of the game as "a rushed project" and noted that it "fails to live up to its full potential." Similarly, Polygon explained that The Top 100 "goes hard on the minigames and light on everything else". It criticized the Minigame Island mode for feeling like "a random, obligatory grind". It noted that The Top 100 "does a very good thing by giving us tons of minigames to play" but criticized the structure board game aspect of the game.

Some sources criticized Super Mario Party for its lack of an online board game mode, although others still praised the lack of the car mechanic and the focus on traditional Mario Party gameplay. Nearly three years after release, a late patch has made the board game mode available for online play for the first time in the series.

=== Sales ===
The Mario Party sub-series have generally performed well in sales. Mario Party 8 sold nearly nine million copies, making it the eleventh best-selling Wii game. Super Mario Party, released in 2018, is the series' best-selling game with 21.16 million units sold, and Mario Party DS, released in 2007, is the best-selling portable entry.

Game (Year)	Platform	Units sold (in millions)
Super Mario Party (2018)	Nintendo Switch	21.16
Mario Party Superstars (2021)	Nintendo Switch	14
Mario Party DS (2007)	Nintendo DS	9.31
Mario Party 8 (2007)	Wii	8.85
Super Mario Party Jamboree (2024)	Nintendo Switch	7.48
Mario Party 9 (2012)	Wii	3.11
Mario Party: Island Tour (2013)	Nintendo 3DS	2.90
Mario Party (1998)	Nintendo 64	2.70
Mario Party 2 (1999)	Nintendo 64	2.48
Mario Party 4 (2002)	GameCube	2.46
Mario Party 10 (2015)	Wii U	2.27
Mario Party 5 (2003)	GameCube	2.17
Mario Party 7 (2005)	GameCube	2.08
Mario Party 3 (2000)	Nintendo 64	1.91
Mario Party 6 (2004)	GameCube	1.63

=== Controversies ===
In the original 1998 Mario Party game for the Nintendo 64, some minigames required players to rotate the controller's analogue stick as fast as they could, including one in which the player is challenged to wind up Fly-Guy at the minigame house. Some players used the palms of their hands, rather than their thumbs, to rotate the analogue stick. As a result, they would often endure blisters. In response, Nintendo gave away free gaming gloves to the victims of these blisters. Some wore away the stick because it was not very durable. The analogue stick rotation has no longer been used since Mario Party 2. The exceptions are the mini-game in Mario Party 5 in which the player only needs to rotate it once and the mini-game in Mario Party 3 in which players throw Bowser in a manner similar to Super Mario 64 and do not need to use the palm of their hand to move the analogue stick. Mario Party: Island Tour resumed using these types of minigames because players can spin the Nintendo 3DS' analogue stick safely. In Mario Party Superstars, since the game utilizes analog sticks again, a disclaimer is placed on the rules screen for the minigames Tug o' War and Cast Aways warning players to not use their palms to turn the stick to avoid hand injury and stick damage. A similar warning appears for the Nintendo Switch Online version of Mario Party when starting the game.

In July 2007, Mario Party 8 for Nintendo's Wii home console was withdrawn from stores in the United Kingdom shortly after its release date. This was allegedly caused by Kamek using the word "spastic." Complaints were raised from consumers because the term is used to refer to an intellectually disabled person and is considered highly offensive in the United Kingdom. In August 2007, Nintendo re-released the game, replacing "spastic" with the word "erratic".
