= Mario Party 3 =

2000 video game

- North American box art
- Developer: Hudson Soft
- Publisher: Nintendo
- Director: Kenji Kikuchi
- Producers: Shinji Hatano; Shinichi Nakamoto
- Designer: Fumihisa Sato
- Programmers: Syunsuke Tanaka; Kazuhiro Matsushita; Masahide Tomita
- Artists: Keisuke Kasahara; Kayo Fujimoto; Hitoshi Takiyama; Hisao Okada
- Composer: Ichiro Shimakura
- Series: Mario Party
- Platform: Nintendo 64
- Release: JP: December 7, 2000; NA: May 7, 2001; AU: September 3, 2001; EU: November 16, 2001
- Genre: Party
- Modes: Single-player, multiplayer

Mario Party 3 (Note: Japanese: マリオパーティ3, Hepburn: Mario Pāti Surī) is a 2000 party video game developed by Hudson Soft and published by Nintendo for the Nintendo 64. The third installment in the Mario Party series, it was first released in Japan on December 7, 2000, in North America on May 7, 2001, in Australia on September 3, 2001, and in Europe on November 16, 2001. As with the previous installments, the player chooses between eight playable characters: Mario, Luigi, Princess Peach, Yoshi, Wario, and Donkey Kong from the first two games, alongside newcomers Princess Daisy and Waluigi. The game introduces duel maps, where two players try to lower each other's stamina to zero using non-player characters such as Chain Chomps.

Mario Party 3 received generally mixed reviews, with critics divided on its new minigames and gameplay features, and whether it was a meaningful improvement over its predecessors. It was a commercial success, with over 1 million copies sold worldwide, making it one of the best-selling Nintendo 64 games. The game was the final first-party Nintendo 64 title released in North America. It was followed by Mario Party 4 for the GameCube in 2002. Content from Mario Party 3 was remastered as part of Mario Party: The Top 100 (2017) for the Nintendo 3DS and Mario Party Superstars (2021) for the Nintendo Switch. The game received its first official re-release on the Nintendo Classics service on October 27, 2023.

== Gameplay ==
Bounce 'n' Trounce, one of the 71 mini-games in Mario Party 3

Mario Party 3 is a party video game featuring eight playable characters of the Mario franchise: Mario, Luigi, Yoshi, Wario, Princess Peach, and Donkey Kong are available to play in all modes, while newcomers Princess Daisy and Waluigi are unavailable in the game's Story Mode. In the game's storyline, Mario and his friends witness the descent of the Millennium Star, a mystical star born once every thousand years that allows whoever possesses him to become the "Superstar of the universe". When the group begins to debate the Star's ownership, the Star transports the group into a large toy box and proclaims that the group members must prove their worthiness and earn the Millennium Star's acceptance by collecting the seven "Star Stamps" scattered across several lands. The gameplay is presented in the form of a traditional board game, and includes five themed game board maps. Mario Party 3 includes multiplayer compatibility; each game on a board map consists of four players, including at least one human player and up to four. Any character who is not controlled by a human will instead be controlled by the game as a computer-controlled character. The skill level of the computer-controlled characters can be individually adjusted between "Easy", "Medium", or "Hard". After the players and board map have been determined, the player chooses how long the board map game will last: "Lite Play" consists of 20 turns, "Standard Play" consists of 35, and "Full Play" consists of 50. The player can also set a "Custom Play" that consists of any number of turns between 10 and 50, but restricted to multiples of 5. Upon starting a board, players each hit a dice block to determine turn order, with the highest number going first on each turn and the lowest number going last.

The goal of Mario Party 3 is to collect the most Stars within the allotted amount of turns. Stars must be purchased from the Millennium Star with coins, which can be earned through a selection from one of 70 mini-games that is played once at the end of each turn. Each time a Star is purchased, the Millennium Star will move to a different location on the board. The first player initiates a turn by rolling a dice block that determines how many spaces they will advance on the board, ranging from one to ten spaces. Each board map has a variety of spaces. Plain blue and red spaces cause the player who lands on one to respectively gain or lose three coins; the amount of coins is doubled to six during the final five turns. Red spaces marked with an insignia of Bowser's head will cause Bowser to appear and hinder the player's progress. Green "!" spaces will initiate a single-player Chance Time mini-game, in which selected characters must give or exchange coins or stars; the player who landed on the space is given three blocks to hit, determining which characters and prize will be involved. Green spaces marked with a Goomba initiate a four-player Battle mini-game, in which coins are taken from the players and the winner receives the majority of the accumulated coins. Green "?" spaces result in an event occurring on the board map; each board features different events which can help or hinder certain players. When a player passes a green space marked with a bag of coins, they must deposit five coins into a "Koopa Bank"; players who land right on the space can withdraw all of the coins that have been deposited. Green spaces marked with a Shy Guy initiate a single-player Game Guy mini-game, in which the player may either win a multiplied amount of their coins or lose all of their coins.

The players can obtain items for use on the board, and can each carry up to three at a time. If a player is carrying an item, they can use it before rolling the dice block. Items can aid the player in such ways as providing additional dice blocks or stealing another player's item. One item, the Skeleton Key, allows the player to use shortcuts located on each board map. Items can be purchased from shops on the board or won from special single-player mini-games initiated by landing on green spaces marked with Toad's head. Boo appears in certain locations of the map, and can steal coins or a Star from another player on behalf of any player who passes him; stealing coins costs five coins, while stealing a Star costs 50 coins. If a player is targeted for their coins, they can limit the amount of coins that Boo steals by repeatedly tapping the A button.

After all four players have made a movement on the board, a mini-game is initiated. The type of mini-game that is played is determined based on the color of space that each player landed on. Players that have landed on a green space will be randomly assigned either red or blue as their color before the mini-game is selected. If all players are the same color, a 4-player mini-game is played. If players are on separate colors, they will split into teams and play either a 1 vs. 3 or 2 vs. 2 mini-game. The specific mini-game is then selected via roulette. Before the mini-game's initiation, players can review the rules and controls as well as practice the mini-game. Coins are rewarded based on the results of the mini-game, with the winner(s) receiving ten coins. Another turn is initiated following the end of a mini-game, and the process is repeated until the allotted number of turns have been completed.

During the final five turns of a game, a one-on-one Duel mini-game is initiated when a player lands on the same space as another. Duels can be initiated prior to the final five turns if a player uses the Dueling Glove item. After the end of the last turn, if bonuses are toggled on, the winners of three awards are announced, with each winner receiving one additional Star; the first two awards are given to the player(s) who collected the most coins in mini-games and throughout the board map game, and the third is given to the player(s) who landed on the most "?" spaces. The winner of the game is then determined by the number of total coins and Stars collected by each player. If two or more characters have acquired the same amount of coins and Stars, the winner will be determined with a roll of the dice block.

=== Other modes ===
Mario Party 3 includes a Duel mode, in which two players use a selection of up to two partners to attack their opponent and deplete their health. The partners can be positioned in front of or behind the player, and must be paid a salary at the beginning of each turn; the partner will leave if their salary cannot be paid. The mode can either be played in 20 turns or for an indefinite amount of turns until one of the players' health is depleted.

The partners do the battling to reduce the opponent's health, and defend the player from incoming attack. Each partner has its own health, and if it reaches zero, they disappear, and if the attacking partner deals more damage than the defending partner can take, the player takes damage equal to the difference. If no partner is between the attacking partner and the opponent, they take all the damage directly. The characters cannot attack their opponent directly. Some of the partners' attacks cannot be protected against, and each partner costs a certain number of coins for the player to keep it, and if the player has two partners, their salary combines. Occasionally, if a partner is attacked by the opponent's partner, the attack will miss. When the turn count expires, the winner is decided, and it is whoever has more health left. The game will end before the turn count expires if either player's health hits 0. If the turn count expires and both players have the same amount of health, whoever has the most coins wins. If both their health and coins numbers are the same, which is rare, the game ends in a draw.

Duel mini-games and Game Guy mini-games are the only mini-games available to be played on a duel board. Unlike Battle Royale, they do not occur after every turn, but only if either player lands on a mini-game space. There is also a part of each map that makes the players play a duel mini game for 20, 30 or 40 coins after it is passed five times. Game Guy mini-games occur more often here than in Battle Royale. Items are not present in Duel mode.

In the Story Mode to the series, one player starts a campaign through every board, challenging computer controlled opponents at a shortened version of Party Mode. The player's objective is to defeat the other characters and earn stamps from the Millennium Star. After all seven stamps are acquired the player is challenged to a final duel with the Millennium Star, in which the player must hit the Millennium Star three times (six times on Normal difficulty and nine on Hard difficulty) with stars in order to complete story mode. Each time the player completes an objective, they are given a rank of S to C depending on how well they completed that objective. When all the objectives have been completed, a title representing the player's overall progress in the game is awarded. This is determined by the ranks they earned for each objective. If enough "S" ranks are acquired, that character becomes a "Miracle Star" and the Game Guy Room in the Mini Game House is opened for use. Simply beating the Story Mode and not earning a high title will cause the character's face to be sculpted into the mountain.

== Development ==
Like prior games in the Mario Party franchise, Mario Party 3 was developed by Hudson Soft and published by Nintendo. It is the first Mario Party game to have multiple save slots and the first to have Princess Daisy and Waluigi as playable characters. On August 9, 2000, it was revealed to have 70 new mini games. Later that month, Nintendo released 12 more screenshots of the game's adventure boards. The game was about 70% completed during the time being.

The game had a marketing budget of $4 million.

== Reception ==
Reception

Aggregate score
Aggregator	Score
Metacritic	74/100

Review scores
Publication	Score
AllGame	4/5
Computer and Video Games	6/10
Electronic Gaming Monthly	6.5/10, 7/10, 8.5/10
Famitsu	31/40
Game Informer	4/10
GamePro	18/20
GameRevolution	C
GameSpot	7.5/10
Hyper	73/100
IGN	6.4/10
Jeuxvideo.com	14/20
NGC Magazine	72%
Nintendo Power	4.5/5
Official Nintendo Magazine	92%

Mario Party 3 received "mixed or average" reviews from critics, according to the review aggregation website Metacritic. While GamePro calling it "one of the last and best games you can play on the system with up to three buddies", other reviewers were critical of Mario Party 3 for largely using the same gameplay as the previous installments, with only minimal changes. Critics stated that the game was best when played with friends. NGC Magazine wrote, "Playing against the CPU is one of the most frustrating exercises known to man."

Other common points, both positive and negative, included the mini-games, new features, and how the title compared to previous entries. Gavin Frankle of AllGame called Mario Party 3 the most enjoyable in the series, reasoning that it "provides enough to entice new fans and satisfy existing ones". However, he also noted it "does little to further the genre or remedy the problems that have been around since the first game." Nintendo Power described the mini-games as "the real life of the party", and Joe Fielder of GameSpot and Cam Shea of Hyper agreed that Mario Party 3 had the best mini-games in the series. However, the opinions towards them ranged from a few being "stinkers", to many being senseless, boring, and "just plain stupid". Shea as well as Dr. Moo of GameRevolution also praised the duel mode, Shea reasoning that it alongside the item site was two of the title's lacking number of gameplay variants. Dr. Moo wrote that the mini-games make up for some of the game's faults. However, Shea and Dr. Moo was critical of the series' usual incorporation of random luck, as well as having to wait for computer-controlled opponents. One negative comment among the Nintendo Power staff review was that "it seems like many of the challenges are based on overcoming unresponsive controls."

Fielder considered the graphics similar to the previous games and wrote that they "look as good as they need to for this kind of game, but are certainly not going to win it any awards." Fran Mirabella III of IGN stated that the game "uses the same bright colors, low-resolution textures, and choppy animation that the rest have." Fielder considered the soundtrack to be a slight improvement over the previous games. Mirabella considered the music "just as outdated as the graphics," but also called it "very cute" and wrote that it "does the job of keeping your ears occupied in the cheesiest of ways."

In 2015, IGN listed the game at number one on its list of "Best Mario Party Games," writing, "The best Mario Party games know the balance between luck and skill, and Mario Party 3 best exemplifies this rule. Just about everything that made Mario Party 2 so great was pushed further as Mario Party 3 introduced even more strategic items, creative new boards, and some truly fun minigames." TheGamer also placed Mario Party 3 first in its ranking of 17 Mario Party games, praising its boards, minigames, and visuals.

The game sold over 1,000,000 units worldwide; however, largely due to being released late in the Nintendo 64's lifespan, it did not sell well in western regions.

=== Awards ===
Mario Party 3 won the "Console Family" award from the Academy of Interactive Arts & Sciences during the 5th Annual Interactive Achievement Awards.

== See also ==
- List of Nintendo 64 games
- List of party video games
- List of video games featuring Mario
- 2000 in video games
