= Mario Party 5 =

2003 video game

- North American box art
- Developer: Hudson Soft
- Publisher: Nintendo
- Director: Kenji Kikuchi
- Producer: Hiroshi Sato; Atsushi Ikeda
- Designer: Shinichi Nakata
- Composer: Aya Tanaka
- Series: Mario Party
- Platform: GameCube
- Release: NA: November 11, 2003; JP: November 28, 2003; PAL: December 5, 2003
- Genre: Party
- Modes: Single-player, multiplayer

Mario Party 5 (Note: Japanese: マリオパーティ5, Hepburn: Mario Pāti Faibu) is a 2003 party video game developed by Hudson Soft and published by Nintendo for the GameCube. It is the fifth installment in the Mario Party series, and the second game in the series to be released for the GameCube. The game is set in the fictional Dream Depot, consisting of seven game boards. The single-player "Story" game mode involves the player winning multiple games against the Koopa Kids to prevent Bowser from conquering the Dream Depot. The main multiplayer game mode consists of four characters from the Mario series playing a board game, with each board having a set theme. The game also features several minigames, which are played after every set of turns. Mario Party 5 introduces the "Super Duel" mode to the franchise, which requires players to assemble and control custom made battle vehicles which can be used in combat against other machines. The game features 10 playable characters, with playable debuts to the series from Toad, Boo, and Koopa Kid.

Mario Party 5 was released in North America on November 11, 2003, Japan on November 28, 2003, and in PAL regions on December 5, 2003. The game received mixed reviews from critics, who enjoyed the new minigames of the series, although a perceived lack of originality was criticized. The game became part of the Nintendo Player's Choice label in 2004, and won the Console Children's Award at the 2004 Interactive Achievement Awards. It was followed by Mario Party 6 for the GameCube in 2004.

== Gameplay ==
Gameplay takes place on themed game boards. Shown is Princess Daisy traversing the "Sweet Dream" board, which reflect cakes and other desserts. The four players' game statistics are displayed in each corner.

Mario Party 5 is a party video game based on an interactive board game played by four characters from the Mario franchise. The game features 10 playable characters in total. New characters included Toad, Boo, and Baby Bowser. In the game, which features six game boards, players roll a dice and walk on squares which either add or subtract player's coins or randomly trigger one of the 70 minigames. Some mini-games are variations of mini-games from previous Mario Party games. In comparison with previous Mario Party games, the boards in this one are larger.

The goal of the game is to collect the most stars, while sabotaging opponents. Coins can be obtained and lost while playing minigames and when collecting capsules. A minigame is played at the end of each round. During gameplay, mini-game rules are determined by the results of the players' moves and are grouped by type. Special mini-games include Bowser mini-games, which pit players against Bowser in a game without rewards, and DK mini-games, which feature Donkey Kong and reward all players. Additional categories—easy, action, skill, and goofy—allow the players to designate which games will appear during a play through. A new power-up system replaced older mechanics from previous games; capsules are now obtained from vending machines on the board; they have random and unclear effects. Players can place capsules on board spaces to affect whoever passes by. These capsules grant power-ups such as extra dice rolls, limiting opponents' movement, and the ability to steal coins.

Each minigame can be accessed individually in a separate gamemode, once unlocked. Additional game modes, include the single-player campaign titled Story Mode, in which the player plays with artificial intelligence (AI)-controlled players, the Super Duel mode, in which the players battle against each other in vehicles, and the Bonus mode, which includes games for four players, such as volleyball, ice hockey, and cards. In the Story Mode, the player faces three Baby Bowsers; turns are taken simultaneously to speed up gameplay. The goal is to steal all their coins. In the Super Duel Mode, players earn coins, buy parts, and build custom battle machines.

== Development and release ==
Mario Party 5 was developed by Hudson Soft and published by Nintendo for the GameCube. Nintendo first unveiled the game at the E3 conference in 2003, where eight mini-games were available in a playable demonstration. An unspecified release date in 2003 was also publicized. Other details included that new characters would be introduced, there would be more minigames than its predecessor, and duel minigames would return. A demo of the game was released in North America via a special edition bonus disc packaged with Mario Kart: Double Dash (2003). Mario Party 5 was released on November 11, 2003, in the North America, November 28 in Japan, and December 5 in Europe. Following the release, Nintendo announced Mario Party 5 as a "Player's Choice" title, which is a label for Nintendo titles that had sold more than one million copies to be sold at a bargain price.

== Reception ==
Reception

Aggregate score
Aggregator	Score
Metacritic	69/100

Review scores
Publication	Score
Edge	5/10
Electronic Gaming Monthly	8/10
Eurogamer	5/10
Game Informer	2.25/10
GamePro	3.5/5
GameRevolution	C
GameSpot	6.9/10
GameSpy	3/5
IGN	7.9/10
Nintendo Power	4.2/5
Nintendo World Report	6.5/10
X-Play	3/5

Mario Party 5 received "mixed or average" reviews, according to review aggregator Metacritic. Justin Leeper of Game Informer advised to not play the game. On the other hand, Michael Cole of Nintendo World Report labelled Mario Party 5 as the best game in the series, though admitted that it only made marginal improvements rather than improve any larger problems with previous games. Despite the mixed reception, the Academy of Interactive Arts & Sciences awarded Mario Party 5 with "Console Children's Game of the Year" at the 7th Annual Interactive Achievement Awards. It sold 800,000 copies in the US.

The mini-games and game modes were positively received by reviewers. Reviewers praised the mini-game selection; GR Chimp of GameRevolution, however, disagreed, citing a lack of diversity. Dan Elektro of GamePro praised the mini-games' accessibility, while Peer Schneider of IGN praised their design and creativity. The single-player mode was commended by reviewers, as well as the multi-player experience. However, Cole and X-Play's Skyler Miller regarded the single-player experience as monotonous and dull. The game modes were also commended. Dan "Shoe" Hsu of Electronic Gaming Monthly praised the introduction of new game modes. Elektro commended the story mode's streamlined AI turns, while Cole did the sport modes.

The gameplay elements received a mixed response. Edge magazine noted that the gameplay remained unchanged from previous Mario Party installments. Chimp felt that the game would be better appreciated by fans of previous installments because of this, while Ryan Davis writing for GameSpot felt the game was thus "hard to recommend" for players who had already gotten Mario Party 4. The game's presentation also left a mixed response; some reviewers liked it, while others did not. Reviewers also criticized the slow pace of the game; Tom Bramwell of Eurogamer especially took issue with the AI-controlled players. The board gameplay was additionally criticized. Jon Gibson of GameSpy said that bigger boards made long games frustrating. Electronic Gaming Monthly called the new boards lifeless, but praised the ability to customize them. The capsule system, on the other hand, was commended for building on the previous game.

The technical elements of the game also had a varied response, including the sound system. Cole called the music "better-than-average" compared to previous games, while Schneider objected to the lack of voice acting and called the soundtrack "incredibly cheesy", saying there is "no reason to not try something a bit more adventurous." Gibson disliked the graphics and design, while Schneider and the Nintendo Power magazine praised the visuals; Schneider also disliked the long waiting times and unskippable event animations. Dan Elektro of GamePro felt the game had missed crossover potential, suggesting it could've included characters from other Nintendo properties. The Nintendo Power magazine also commended the game's controls.

== See also ==
- List of GameCube games
- List of party video games
- List of video games featuring Mario
- 2003 in video games
