= Mario Party Advance =

2005 video game

- North American box art
- Developer: Hudson Soft (Note: Additional work by A.I)
- Publisher: Nintendo
- Directors: Shinichi Nakata; Yukinori Goto
- Producers: Atsushi Ikeda; Hiroshi Sato
- Designer: Fumihisa Sato
- Programmer: Tetsuharu Takashima
- Composers: Ichiro Shimakura; Yoshimasa Ikeda
- Series: Mario Party
- Platform: Game Boy Advance
- Release: JP: January 13, 2005; NA: March 28, 2005; EU: June 10, 2005; AU: September 15, 2005
- Genre: Party
- Modes: Single-player, multiplayer

Mario Party Advance (Note: Japanese: マリオパーティ アドバンス, Hepburn: Mario Pāti Adobansu) is a 2005 party video game developed by Hudson Soft and published by Nintendo for the Game Boy Advance. It is the first handheld game in the Mario Party series and the seventh entry in the series overall. The game was released in Japan on January 13, 2005, North America on March 28, 2005, Europe on June 10, 2005, and Australia on September 15, 2005. The game was re-released on the Virtual Console for the Wii U in 2014.

Mario Party Advance differs from other titles in the Mario Party series in its focus on one single-player mode rather than several multiplayer modes. However, traditional Mario Party gameplay is present in players choosing a character from the Mario franchise, moving around an interactive game board, and playing a variety of minigames.

Upon release, the game received mixed reviews from critics, many of whom panned its single-player focus. Retrospectively, Mario Party Advance is widely considered to be one of the worst games in the Mario Party series by critics. The game was succeeded by Mario Party 7 for the GameCube the same year of its release.

== Gameplay ==
In Mario Party Advance's single-player mode, players select one of four playable characters from the Mario franchise and navigate a game board, rolling dice, using items, and winning minigames to progress.

The player can choose from four different playable characters of the Mario franchise: Mario, Luigi, Princess Peach, and Yoshi. The player drives a car around a game board, similar to those seen in the previous Mario Party games. The player's starting area on the board depends on which character is selected. The player starts with four Mushrooms. Additional Mushrooms are earned by winning minigames that are played every three turns. The game ends when there are no Mushrooms left. The multiplayer Party Mode that was present in all of the previous Mario Party games is no longer available, and it has been replaced by a new mode called "Shroom City". The aim of the game is to collect all the minigames and "Gaddgets" that were scattered around Shroom City by Bowser, by completing quests assigned to the player by the various inhabitants of Shroom City.

Gaddgets, invented by Professor E. Gadd, are interactive items such as a Morse code generator and a love meter. The game includes over 120 minigames, including Gaddgets. Approximately 12 of the minigames can be played in multiplayer mode, with the use of a Game Link Cable. Certain Gaddgets can also be played in multiplayer mode if players control different buttons on a single Game Boy Advance system. The game also included a paper game board for multiple players that could be played in conjunction with the game cartridge, used by players to roll the dice and to play minigames.

== Development and release ==
Mario Party Advance was developed by Hudson Soft and A.I and published by Nintendo. The game was revealed alongside Mario Pinball Land in April 2004. Mario Party Advance was subsequently showcased at E3 2004, with an original release date of December 6, 2004, which was later pushed back to March 28, 2005. The game's initial release date coinciding with Mario Party 6's North American release date led GameSpot's Chris Kohler to speculate that there could be interconnected gameplay between the titles, though this ultimately was not the case.

Mario Party Advance was released in Japan on January 13, 2005, in North America on March 28, 2005, and in Europe on June 10, 2005. The game was re-released on the Virtual Console for the Wii U in North America and Europe on December 25, 2014, and in Japan on October 28, 2015.

== Reception ==
Reception

Aggregate score
Aggregator	Score
Metacritic	54/100

Review scores
Publication	Score
1Up.com	C
Eurogamer	1/10
Famitsu	27/40
GameSpot	6.5/10
GameSpy	3/5
IGN	6/10
NGC Magazine	2/5
Nintendo Life	7/10
Nintendo Power	3.2/5
Nintendo World Report	4/10
PALGN	1.5/10
X-Play	3/5
Detroit Free Press	2/4

Mario Party Advance received "mixed or average" reviews from critics, according to the review aggregation website Metacritic. In Japan, four critics from Famitsu gave the game a total score of 27 out of 40.

While the game contains a large number of minigames and unlockables, reviewers criticized the game's tendency to punish players based on random chance, rebuked the game for lack of innovation in the minigames, and expressed concerns about the game's limited multiplayer modes. Craig Harris of IGN criticized the game's "incredibly basic and rudimentary graphic and sound presentation", as well as its "slowpaced" single-player mode, its large amount of dialogue, and wrote that most of its minigames "are actually on the bland side, featuring some rudimentary platform challenges or memory games that have been done a billion times before in other games. The 2D environment must have restricted the team's creativity in providing some challenges that are imaginative and fun." Frank Provo of GameSpot called the game's multiplayer modes "fairly limited and poorly organized", but said the single-player mode "is very nicely organized and offers a great deal of variety". Provo praised the "colorful" character sprites, but criticized the game's "bland" backgrounds and some of its minigames.

Kristan Reed of Eurogamer gave the game a score of 1/10, writing that it was "practically the dictionary definition of awful", noting that "most - if not all - of its hundred odd mini games are among some of the most insultingly undemanding and badly-designed efforts you'll ever see associated with the beloved franchise". Reed said "a typical game within Mario Party Advance is often tedious, badly designed and completely lacking in any endearing qualities at all. [...] Animation is virtually non existent, the tedious chatty exchanges that take place between characters lacks any imagination at all and the whole project just smells like something thrown together to meet a contractual obligation". Reed concluded: "And if you haven't got the message yet, Mario Party Advance is possibly the worst videogame Nintendo has had the misfortune to publish. Avoid at all costs; this is disgracefully bad." Karen Chu of 1UP.com wrote, "Though I'm open to new possibilities and reinterpretations of Mario Party, playing this game made me want to just jump on my Gamecube and play the original console versions -- even if I have to play against 3 CPU players because frankly, being the only player on a board game that's advertised as a party is just disheartening."

Retrospectively, Mario Party Advance is widely considered to be one of the worst Mario Party games by critics. The game's Metacritic score of 54 out of 100 is the worst for any Mario Party title present in the site. It is the third lowest rated game part of the greater Mario franchise after WarioWare: Snapped! and Donkey Kong: Barrel Blast, which is the worst rated.

In 2015, IGN listed the game at the bottom of its list of "Best Mario Party Games", writing, "Mario Party Advance is the black sheep of the Mario Party series. This handheld version forwent the classic style of four players collecting stars and coins in favor of a single player focused mode. The heart of the Mario Party series lies in its multiplayer, so while this new approach brought a few interesting ideas, it never achieved what made all the other games so enticing."

In 2022, Digital Trends placed Mario Party Advance 16th in its ranking of 18 Mario Party games. In 2023, TheGamer listed the game just above Mario Party-e in its "Every Mario Party Game, Ranked" list, complimenting its minigames while criticizing its focus on a single-player experience, stating: "Mario Party Advance isn't a bad game. Most of the minigames are fun, but it's tailored to a single-player experience." TheGamer concluded: "Though it is admirable that Nintendo put a lot of work into making a portable Party experience, the game falters in one critical area: it isn't much of a party."

== See also ==
- List of Game Boy Advance games
- List of party video games
- List of video games featuring Mario
- 2005 in video games
