= Mario Party 4 =

2002 video game

- North American box art
- Developer: Hudson Soft
- Publisher: Nintendo
- Director: Kenji Kikuchi
- Producers: Shinji Hatano; Shinichi Nakamoto
- Designer: Fumihisa Sato
- Composer: Ichiro Shimakura
- Series: Mario Party
- Platform: GameCube
- Release: NA: October 21, 2002; JP: November 8, 2002; PAL: November 29, 2002
- Genre: Party
- Modes: Single-player, multiplayer

Mario Party 4 (Note: Mario Party 4 (Japanese: マリオパーティ4, Hepburn: Mario Pātī Fō)) is a 2002 party video game developed by Hudson Soft and published by Nintendo for the GameCube. It is the fourth installment in the Mario Party series and the first one to be released for GameCube. Like the previous games in the series, it features eight playable characters from the Mario franchise—Mario, Luigi, Princess Peach, Yoshi, Wario, Donkey Kong, Princess Daisy, and Waluigi—competing in a board game, with the objective of each of the six game boards being to earn the most Stars. Besides the standard multiplayer mode, the game also features a single-player campaign in which the player plays the game with artificial intelligence-controlled players.

Mario Party 4 was announced in March 2002 and was later showcased at E3 2002. The game was released in North America on October 21, 2002, Japan on November 8, 2002, and in PAL regions on November 29, 2002. The game received mixed reviews, with complaints going to the single-player mode, the design of game boards, and sound effects, while the graphics and controls were praised. It won the Family Game of the Year award at the Interactive Achievement Awards of 2003. The game was followed by Mario Party 5 for the same console in 2003.

== Gameplay ==
Characters must hit a dice block to move forward on the board; the mushroom represents an Item Shop.

Mario Party 4 is a puzzle and party video game based on an interactive board game played by four characters from the Mario franchise. The game features eight playable characters in total, Mario, Princess Peach, Luigi, Donkey Kong, Princess Daisy, Yoshi, Wario, and Waluigi. In the game, which features six game boards, players roll a dice and walk on squares which either add or subtract player's coins or randomly trigger one of the 50 minigames. The goal of the game is to collect the most coins and stars; stars can be acquired when a player reaches a square with a star on it, or by either winning the most minigames, most coins, or landing on the most "Happening Spaces" squares. A minigame is played at the end of each round. There are two types of mushrooms that the player can acquire: a mega mushroom, which gives the player an extra dice, increases the player's size, and the ability to steal 10 coins from another player, and a mini mushroom, which shrinks the player and limits the dice to first five numbers, but allows the player to go through pipes, which allow the player to access shortcuts on the board. Items that can additionally be bought from a store include pipes, a genie lamp, which teleports the player to a star on the board, and the Boo's crystal ball, which allows the player to steal another player's star. The length of a single game can vary; it can last between 10 and 50 turns.

The six game boards are interactive and feature various designs, such as a ghost-themed or tropical-themed board. On the Koopa's Seaside Soiree game board, the player can interact with animals that can either allow the player to access shortcuts or randomize the player's direction, while on the ghost-themed Boo board, a ghost train transports the player around the board. The "reversal of fortune" space on the board allows the player to switch coins and stars with a random player. Mario Party 4 features a variety of minigames, categorized as either a deathmatch (free-for-all) mode, a two-on-two, or one-on-three battle mode; these modes include games such as drag racing, skiing, dominos, soccer, and snowball dodging. Booksquirm is a minigame in which the player has to avoid being crushed in a book, while Dungeon Duos has two players travel through a passageway. Most of the minigames fall under the free-for-all mode. Upon winning a minigame, a player receives coins as a prize, while upon completing the entire game, the player will win a special prize depending on the player's character. Mario Party 4 introduces the ability to practice minigames before playing them in a game with other players.

Besides the standard multiplayer mode, the game offers a "pure minigame mode" and a singleplayer campaign called the "Story Mode", which allows the player to play alone with three artificial intelligence (AI)-controlled players. The game supports progressive scan for HDTV players.

== Development and release ==
Mario Party 4 was developed by Hudson Soft and published by Nintendo. It is the first Mario Party game to be released for GameCube. The game was first announced in a March 2002 Nintendo press conference in Tokyo, with the announcements made by Shigeru Miyamoto and Satoru Iwata. It was targeted as part of the 2002 roster of Nintendo games, which they rated as their "biggest year" for software at the time. Nintendo presented a playable demonstration of the game at E3 2002, featuring a limited set of minigames. The game was released on October 21, 2002, in North America, November 8 in Japan, and November 29 in Europe.

== Reception ==
Reception

Aggregate score
Aggregator	Score
Metacritic	70/100

Review scores
Publication	Score
AllGame	3/5
Electronic Gaming Monthly	8.5/10, 8.5/10, 8/10
Eurogamer	5/10
Famitsu	30/40
Game Informer	3/10
GamePro	4.5/5
GameRevolution	C+
GameSpot	7.2/10
GameSpy	3.5/5
IGN	6.9/10
Nintendo Life	8/10
Nintendo World Report	7/10
X-Play	3/5

Mario Party 4 received "mixed or average" reviews, according to review aggregator Metacritic. In Japan, four critics from Famitsu gave the game a total score of 30 out of 40.

Reviewers positively received the minigames of Mario Party 4. Fran Mirabella III of IGN praised the minigames as entertaining due to their "freshness...in combination with unbridled multiplayer action", while Johnny Liu of GameRevolution commended the Booksquirm and Dungeon Duos minigames. Greg Bemis of Extended Play singled out the Goomba's Greedy Gala board as the most satisfying for its gameplay depth, particularly in longer games. Andrew Reiner of Game Informer, however, described the boards as confusing and "poorly designed", and the minigames as having bad design and control system. Tom Bramwell of Eurogamer disliked the "reversal of fortune" space, calling it "unfair", and the big size of game boards, adding that "interest wanes very quickly in a group of four". Michael Cole of Nintendo World Report commended the "mega-mini" system with mushrooms. Reviewers also disliked the single-player mode for having the player watch AI-controlled players take turns. Ryan Steddy of Nintendo Life described the single-player mode as a "dull add-on".

Additionally, reviewers commended the improvement of the game's graphics, particularly those of the characters. Liu and Mirabella III noted that the graphics were an improvement of the previous installments featured on the Nintendo 64. Ryan Davis of GameSpot praised the lighting and particle effects. Liu, however, also noted that the graphics were not greatly detailed. Although Bad Hare of GamePro commended the music, Mirabella III did not consider it to be fun. Bramwell and Mirabella III disliked the sound effects, while Cole disliked the voice acting. Scott Alan Marriott of AllGame had mixed opinions on the sound effects.

Bramwell, Hare, and Bryn Williams of GameSpy praised the game's controls. However, Bramwell noted that if a player's reaction is slow it would often result in losing minigames.

TheGamer ranked Mario Party 4 the best entry in the series. Den of Geek viewed it as the fourth best game in the Mario Party series, citing its minigames.

=== Sales and accolades ===
Mario Party 4 won "Family Game of the Year" during the AIAS' 6th Annual Interactive Achievement Awards. It was nominated for GameSpot's annual "Best Party Game on GameCube" award, which went to Super Monkey Ball 2.

The game sold 1,100,000 units from its release to December 27, 2007, in North America, and an additional 900,000 copies in Japan, bringing its overall sales to 2,000,000.

== See also ==
- List of GameCube games
- List of party video games
- List of video games featuring Mario
- 2002 in video games
