= Mario Party: The Top 100 =

2017 video game

- International promotional artwork
- Developer: NDcube
- Publisher: Nintendo
- Director: Tsutomu Komiyama
- Producers: Keisuke Terasaki; Toyokazu Nonaka; Toshiaki Suzuki; Atsushi Ikeda; Kenji Kikuchi
- Designer: Takeru Sugimoto
- Programmer: Shinji Shibasaki
- Artist: Susumu Kuribayashi
- Composers: Masayoshi Ishi; Sara Sakurai
- Series: Mario Party
- Platform: Nintendo 3DS
- Release: NA: November 10, 2017; PAL: December 22, 2017; JP: December 28, 2017
- Genre: Party
- Modes: Single-player, multiplayer

Mario Party: The Top 100 (Note: Known in Japan as Mario Party 100 Minigame Collection (Japanese: マリオパーティ100 ミニゲームコレクション, Hepburn: Mario Pāti Hyaku Minigēmu Korekushon)) is a 2017 party video game developed by NDcube and published by Nintendo for the Nintendo 3DS. It is the fifth handheld game in the Mario Party series, as well as the third and final Mario Party game to be released for the 3DS. Announced during a Nintendo Direct in September 2017, the game was first released in North America in November 2017, and was released in PAL regions and Japan in December 2017.

Mario Party: The Top 100 is primarily a compilation of 100 minigames from across the Mario Party series, specifically ones from the home console installments. The game offers several game modes centered around playing minigames, including a mode that sees traditional Mario Party gameplay with up to four playable characters from the Mario franchise, each controlled by either a human player or artificial intelligence, competing in an interactive board game.

Mario Party: The Top 100 received mixed reviews, with general praise for its premise as a minigame compilation and criticism toward its lack of content aside from the minigames. A similar entry, Mario Party Superstars, which also features 100 minigames from the home console games, was released for the Nintendo Switch in 2021.

== Gameplay ==
Four playable characters (Princess Peach, Princess Daisy, Waluigi, and Wario) competing in the "Peak Precision" minigame from Mario Party 9 (2012)

Mario Party: The Top 100 is a party video game that is a compilation of 100 minigames that were introduced in the first 10 Mario Party games for home consoles. Most of the minigames received upgraded graphics and audio, and several minigames that appeared in Mario Party games for the Wii were reworked to properly function on the Nintendo 3DS, which lacks the Wii's motion controls. The game boasts eight playable characters: Mario, Luigi, Princess Peach, Princess Daisy, Wario, Waluigi, Yoshi, and Rosalina. These characters can be controlled by human players as well as artificial intelligence (AI).

Mario Party: The Top 100 features game modes in which Toad or Toadette guides the players. In the Minigame Match mode, players roll dice to move around a single game board simultaneously, with the goal being to collect the most Stars by the end of a board game, as in prior Mario Party titles. Players earn one Star for every ten coins collected, which in turn can be earned from minigames. Items on the board can be collected and used to help players gain an advantage over their opponents. Unlike in previous Mario Party installments, rather than automatically being played at the end of every turn, minigames are played whenever certain items are used or a player pops a Minigame Balloon.

Another game mode, Minigame Island, revolves around playing through preselected minigames to advance along a linear path, with the player occasionally facing off against Bowser, Donkey Kong, or another non-playable character in a minigame, culminating in a duel against Bowser at the end of the campaign. Playing through Minigame Island is required for unlocking several dozen of the minigames. Completing this mode for the first time unlocks a harder challenge mode, and collecting every Star by getting first place unlocks the hardest computer-controlled character difficulty level, "Master". The Championship Battles mode involves playing three or five minigames from a selected pack, with the player(s) winning the most minigames being declared the winner(s), while the Decathlon mode consists of playing five or ten minigames to earn the most points. Mario Party: The Top 100 also includes a "free play" mode, wherein players can choose which minigames to play. Additionally, the game features a collection menu, where players can listen to music and view characters from the Mario franchise.

Despite lacking an online multiplayer option, Mario Party: The Top 100 supports local multiplayer for up to four players through the use of either individual copies of the game or the 3DS's Download Play functionality, with only one player being required to have a copy of the game. The Top 100 also has Amiibo compatibility, allowing players to unlock minigames quicker and receive assistance during rounds, as well as obtain coins and acquire an extra life after a game over.

== Development and release ==
Mario Party: The Top 100 was developed by NDcube and published by Nintendo; the latter announced the game on September 13, 2017, during a Nintendo Direct. Some reviewers initially expressed disappointment with the game not also being available on the Nintendo Switch, which GameSpot's Chris Pereira stated "would seemingly be a perfect fit". An overview trailer was released the following month.

Less than two months after it was announced, Mario Party: The Top 100 was released for the Nintendo 3DS in North America on November 10, 2017. The game was subsequently released in PAL regions on December 22, 2017, and in Japan on December 28, 2017; it was originally set for release in Europe on January 5, 2018.

== Reception ==
=== Critical response ===
Reception

Aggregate scores
Aggregator	Score
Metacritic	59/100
OpenCritic	3% recommend

Review scores
Publication	Score
Destructoid	5/10
Famitsu	8/10, 8/10, 8/10, 8/10
Hardcore Gamer	3.5/5
Nintendo Life	6/10
Nintendo World Report	4.5/10
CGMagazine	5/10
Common Sense Media	2/5

According to the review aggregation website Metacritic, Mario Party: The Top 100 received "mixed or average" reviews from critics. Fellow review aggregator OpenCritic assessed that the game received weak approval, being recommended by 3% of critics. In Japan, four critics from Famitsu gave The Top 100 a total score of 32 out of 40, with each critic awarding the game an 8 out of 10. Although the game's premise and sense of nostalgia were praised by multiple reviewers, it generally received criticism for its lack of game boards and additional content.

The concept of a minigame compilation was lauded by several critics, including Polygon's Allegra Frank, who referred to the all-minigame premise as "genius". Destructoid's Caitlin Cooke added that the experience "was a solid trip down nostalgia road". The graphical and audio enhancements of the minigames were also generally complimented.

Critics were divided on the minigame selection. Nintendo Life's Michael Koczwara believed that Mario Party: The Top 100's goal of being a compilation of the best minigames in the Mario Party series "was accomplished with great results", Destructoid's Caitlin Cooke felt that the game "did a fairly decent job" representing the most fun and popular minigames from the series, and Common Sense Media's David Wolinsky noted that most of the minigames were very approachable. Conversely, CGMagazine's Jordan Biordi wrote that there were "maybe 15–20 good minigames" from three of the first four installments in the series. Moreover, Nintendo World Report's Matt West criticized the presentation of the minigames as "somewhat disconnected" and suggested that the control schemes for some minigames did not transfer well to the 3DS.

The lack of game boards was panned by critics, including Matt West, who singled out Minigame Match as the game's "biggest disappointment", describing the only board map as "pathetically underwhelming" and stating that it "lacks the personality that earlier games in the series were known for". Although Kirstin Swalley of Hardcore Gamer believed that Minigame Match would be the most familiar mode to fans of the Mario Party series as well as the most fun for multiplayer, she also wrote that the only map "quickly gets dull". Reviewers also tended to find disappointment with the other game modes, especially Minigame Island, which was criticized for being too linear. Nintendo Life's Michael Koczwara referred to Minigame Island as "a fun but simple mode", adding that it could be completely finished in around two to three hours and lacked an incentive to replay.

As with most entries in the Mario Party series, reviewers criticized the reliance on luck, particularly in the traditional system of determining a winner, which is based almost entirely on Star and coin amounts. Other topics of criticism included the game's AI, which CGMagazine's Jordan Biordi referred to as "horribly inconsistent" and "pathetic", as well as the absence of an online multiplayer mode, which Biordi believed was the game's "most glaring problem".

In concluding his review for Nintendo Life, Michael Koczwara wrote: "Mario Party: The Top 100 may hold the record for the most minigames, but it certainly has the least amount of content and the lowest replayability." Looking ahead to the future of the Mario Party series as a whole, Destructoid's Caitlin Cooke wrote: "Hopefully Nintendo can keep the series alive and perfect the spirit of Mario Party for the Switch, but for now I think Mario Party games are officially dead for the 3DS." Retrospectively, Jesse Lennox of Digital Trends placed the game 14th in a ranking of 18 Mario Party titles, concluding: "Minigames alone can't make a great Mario Party, and Mario Party: The Top 100 is proof of that."

=== Sales ===
Mario Party: The Top 100 sold more than 52,000 copies within its first week on sale in Japan, which placed it at #5 on the software sales chart, behind Super Mario Odyssey, Splatoon 2, Mario Kart 8 Deluxe, and Pokémon Ultra Sun and Ultra Moon.

=== Legacy ===
Mario Party: The Top 100 was succeeded by Super Mario Party, a 2018 title for the Nintendo Switch. An installment similar to Mario Party: The Top 100, Mario Party Superstars, which also features 100 minigames from the home console entries, was released for the Switch in 2021.

== See also ==
- List of party video games
- List of video games featuring Mario
- 2017 in video games
