= Mario Party 9 =

2012 video game

- North American box art
- Developer: NDcube
- Publisher: Nintendo
- Director: Shuichiro Nishiya
- Producers: Hiroshi Sato; Atsushi Ikeda
- Designer: Tatsumitsu Watanabe
- Programmer: Shinji Shibasaki
- Artist: Hiroshi Hayashi
- Composers: Toshiki Aida; Ryosuke Asami
- Series: Mario Party
- Platform: Wii
- Release: EU: March 2, 2012; AU: March 8, 2012; NA: March 11, 2012; JP: April 26, 2012
- Genre: Party
- Modes: Single player, multiplayer

Mario Party 9 (Note: Japanese: マリオパーティ9, Hepburn: Mario Pāti Nain) is a 2012 party video game developed by NDcube and published by Nintendo for the Wii. The ninth main installment in the Mario Party series, it was announced at E3 2011 and released in Europe, North America, and Australia in March 2012, followed by Japan a month later. It was the first game in the series not to be developed by Hudson Soft, which was acquired and dissolved by Konami on March 1, 2012, the day before the game's European release. It was also the final Mario game to be released on the Wii and one of the last official first-party Wii games released in North America, followed by Project Zero 2: Wii Edition and Kirby's Dream Collection.

Mario Party 9 includes seven game boards, twelve playable characters, and more than eighty minigames. The game received mixed reviews from critics, with praise for its gameplay, graphics, multiplayer, minigames, and content, considering it an improvement on its predecessor. However, its overhaul of mechanics received a mixed reception for its linear boards and emphasis on luck. It was followed by the handheld game title Mario Party: Island Tour for the Nintendo 3DS in 2013, with the next home console game, Mario Party 10, being released for the Wii U in 2015.

== Gameplay ==
Four playable characters (Waluigi, Birdo, Koopa Troopa, and Princess Peach) competing in Thwomper Room, one of the free-for-all minigames in Mario Party 9

Following the format of previous Mario Party titles, Mario Party 9 sees two to four players compete in an interactive board game, moving around a virtual game board and playing minigames. A new gameplay element in all of the boards is that all four players move around together in one car. The number of spaces the player moves is determined by a roll of the dice block found within the game. Instead of trying to collect coins to buy stars, players receive Mini Stars if they pass by them. Whoever collects the most Mini Stars wins the game. While doing that, players must also try to avoid Mini Ztars, which deduct their current amount of Mini Stars. Mini Stars and Mini Ztars are replaced with bananas and Z-bananas on the board "DK's Jungle Ruins".

Minigames have a larger focus on the gameplay than they did in the previous game. However, the minigames don't appear after everyone moves, but only when a player ends up on any of the spaces or events that triggers a minigame. A person can play on solo mode to unlock the final stage, as well as two playable characters.

Another new feature is that each board culminates in a boss battle that is played with all players in the vehicle. There is also a boss battle at the halfway point of a board. There are 81 minigames in Mario Party 9, divided into five categories: Free-for-all, 1-vs.-Rivals, Bowser Jr., Boss Battle, and Extra.

At the end of each stage, the number of Mini Stars the player collects is converted into Party Points, which can be used to buy new stages, constellations, vehicles, difficulties, and sounds in the museum.

Mario Party 9 features 12 playable characters, 10 of whom are available from the start: Mario, Luigi, Princess Peach, Princess Daisy, Wario, Waluigi, Yoshi, Birdo, Toad, and Koopa Troopa. Two characters—Shy Guy and Kamek—can be unlocked through Solo Mode. Additionally, the game provides seven boards: Toad Road, Bob-omb Factory, Boo's Horror Castle, Blooper Beach, Magma Mine, Bowser Station, and DK's Jungle Ruins. Both Bowser Station and DK's Jungle Ruins are unlockable.

== Plot ==
The game's story mode begins with the player selecting one of the ten starting playable characters. One night outside of Princess Peach's Castle, the characters gather to watch the Mini Stars glitter in the sky, only for the stars to be sucked away on a spacecraft by Bowser and Bowser Jr. The player character leads a charge with the others to defeat the Bowsers and save the Mini Stars, with Shy Guy and Kamek following from behind as part of Bowser's plan.

The player character travels through all six courses to recover the Mini Stars, fighting off two henchmen selected by Bowser. They must defeat Shy Guy and/or Kamek on each course, assisted throughout by randomly assigned ally characters. In the final course, Bowser Station, the character must defeat both Shy Guy and Kamek en route to defeating Bowser. Bowser's machines trapping the Mini Stars are destroyed, and all the Mini Stars will return to the sky.

The player character will wave goodbye to the stars as they depart for the night sky. Bowser and Bowser Jr. are seen flying in their Clown Cars, their plan to decorate their castle with Mini Stars foiled. All the characters then reunite to witness the Mini Stars once again, and the story concludes with the ending sentences: "And so the adventure came to an end. Rescued by (the character that the player chose), the Mini Stars were free to glitter in the night sky forever."

== Reception ==
=== Critical response ===
Reception

Aggregate score
Aggregator	Score
Metacritic	73/100

Review scores
Publication	Score
Destructoid	7.5/10
Famitsu	34/40
Game Informer	5.75/10
GameRevolution	3/5
GameSpot	6/10
GamesRadar+	4/5
GameTrailers	7.2/10
IGN	7/10
Joystiq	4/5
Nintendo Life	8/10
Nintendo Power	8/10
Nintendo World Report	8.5/10; 8.5/10
Official Nintendo Magazine	86%
VideoGamer.com	7/10

Mario Party 9 received "mixed or average" reviews from critics, according to the review aggregation website Metacritic. In Japan, four critics from Famitsu gave the game a total score of 34 out of 40.

German magazine N-Zone gave Mario Party 9 a 75% score for single player mode, and 85% for multiplayer mode. Nintendo Power said that "the majority of the game's 82 activities are fun", while commenting that "some may be discouraged by the game's radical changes". IGN praised the game's graphical improvement and its control style. Like previous Mario Party games, IGN strongly criticized the luck-based factor of the game. GamesRadar praised Mario Party 9 for being balanced, but criticized the predictability of the boards. Ashton Raze of GameSpot said that the game is too "predictable" and "much too familiar". However, he praised the game's wide variety of fun mini-games and cheerful, colorful visuals.

=== Sales ===
As of September 2012, Mario Party 9 had sold 2.24 million copies worldwide. As of December 31, 2020, worldwide sales had reached 3.11 million units, making Mario Party 9 the 26th best-selling game for the Wii.

== See also ==
- List of Wii games
- List of party video games
- List of video games featuring Mario
- 2012 in video games
