= Mario Party 10 =

2015 video game

- Developer: NDcube
- Publisher: Nintendo
- Director: Shuichiro Nishiya
- Producers: Jumpei Horita; Toshiaki Suzuki; Atsushi Ikeda
- Designer: Tatsumitsu Watanabe
- Programmer: Hideki Sahashi
- Artist: Keisuke Kasahara
- Composers: Rei Kondoh; Toshiki Aida
- Series: Mario Party
- Platform: Wii U
- Release: JP: March 12, 2015; NA/EU: March 20, 2015; AU: March 21, 2015
- Genre: Party
- Modes: Single-player, multiplayer

Mario Party 10 (Note: Japanese: マリオパーティ10, Hepburn: Mario Pāti 10) is a 2015 party video game developed by NDcube and published by Nintendo for the Wii U video game console. It is the tenth home console release in the Mario Party series and a part of the larger Mario franchise. Featuring gameplay similar to the prior series entries, players compete against each other and computer-controlled characters to collect the most mini-stars, traversing a game board and engaging in minigames and other challenges. There are multiple game modes, including one where players traverse a board in a vehicle, sabotaging each other and making choices to collect the most mini-stars by the end. Mario Party 10 adds two modes over its predecessors: Bowser Party, where four players compete in a team against a fifth who controls Bowser on the Wii U GamePad, and Amiibo Party, where players use Amiibo figures. Their gameplay is interspersed by over 70 minigames with various play styles.

Mario Party 10 was developed by NDcube, the developers of Mario Party 9. One of the goals during the development was to focus on gameplay features not found in previous titles. To do this, they concentrated on the Wii U GamePad and Amiibo, as well as made Bowser a playable character. The game was announced at E3 2014 and advertised throughout the year. It was further detailed in a January 2015 Nintendo Direct, alongside the announcement and release of the Amiibo figures. The game was released in Japan, North America, Europe, and Australia in March 2015.

Mario Party 10 received mixed reviews, being praised for its graphics and minigames and criticized for the gameplay and the Amiibo Party mode. The Bowser Party mode and use of the GamePad, as well as its continuation of gameplay that was established in Mario Party 9, attained a mixed reception. The game sold 2.27 million copies by September 2022, making it one of the best-selling Wii U games.

== Gameplay ==
The players move five spaces on the board, preparing to collect mini-stars and compete against Bowser Jr. in a minigame.

In the "Bowser's Roulette Rage" minigame from the Bowser Party game mode, the players on Team Mario must stay out of the bad spaces on the spinning roulette wheel, which the player on Team Bowser can stop at any time.

Mario Party 10's gameplay builds on that of its predecessors, principally Mario Party 9. In the base "Mario Party" game mode, four players, controlled by either players or by artificial intelligence. The players traverse together in a vehicle across a game board. When the end of the board is reached, whoever has collected the most mini-stars wins. The players take turns serving as the vehicle's operator, who rolls a die to move forward by the rolled number of spaces. These contain actions that the operator decides on, such as choosing which path to take when it splits. Two boss battles are on each board, and the four players work together to defeat them. Five maps are included in Mario Party: Mushroom Park, Haunted Trail, Whimsical Waters, Airship Central, and Chaos Castle.

Scattered across the board are minigame spaces, which, when landed on, trigger one of over 70 minigames. Minigames are split into three types: free-for-alls, where all four players compete against each other; two-versus-twos, where players are randomly split into two teams and compete against each other; and three-versus-ones, where three players compete against one with an advantage. Minigames consist of memory, puzzle, and platform gameplay. Some minigames use Wii Remote controls. Bowser is displayed imprisoned on the Wii U GamePad. If the players roll all six sides of the die throughout the course of the game, Bowser is freed and offers additional hindrances and challenges, such as requiring the player to come in last place in a minigame to win it. Each round of Mario Party is roughly 30 minutes in length.

In addition to Mario Party, the game introduces the Bowser Party and Amiibo Party modes. In Bowser Party, four players that make up "Team Mario" compete against a fifth player, "Team Bowser", who controls Bowser using the Wii U GamePad. In this mode, mini-stars are replaced with one end-goal star, and each player has hearts. Team Mario is tasked with reaching the end of the board without losing all of them. Landing on certain spaces will see the player either obtain special dice, get a chance to earn more hearts, be hindered by Bowser Jr., or impact how many dice the fifth player has on their turn. If a player on Team Mario has lost all of their hearts, they can be brought back into play if the others earn additional hearts on the board. While inactive, they can provide the group with special dice to use.

After the players on Team Mario have taken a turn each, the player on Team Bowser takes theirs by rolling four dice. If the total rolled is less than the number of spaces Team Mario is from them, they roll their dice a second time. If Team Bowser manages to catch up to Team Mario, a minigame takes place where Team Bowser uses the GamePad to attempt to weaken and defeat Team Mario. There are 12 such minigames. On some boards, Team Bowser gets to hinder Team Mario by tricking them into setting off traps or facing a disadvantage on a selected route. If Team Mario is close to the goal, Team Bowser may gain an advantage, such as adding more Bowser Jr. spaces to hinder the group. Should Team Mario reach the end of the board, the operator of the vehicle must find a star hidden behind one of three enemies to win the game. A wrong choice will remove that enemy and push the team back a few spaces. Reaching the end when only one enemy remains will win the game for Team Mario. Team Bowser wins the game if they can defeat all other players beforehand.

Amiibo Party involves purchasing and using Amiibo, a toys-to-life product line by Nintendo. Select Amiibo from the Super Mario and Super Smash Bros. lines function with the mode. Amiibo Party takes place on a small, circular board, with the goal of collecting the most stars within ten turns of gameplay. The players take turns rolling the die and advancing on the board by scanning their Amiibo, landing on spaces that give and remove coins, move them forward or backwards additional spaces, reward them with powerups, and engage in minigames. Mini-stars are replaced with stars that are purchased with coins. Whoever purchases the most stars by the end of the 10 turns wins. Each Amiibo alters the board's design and how powerups are distributed. Mario Party 10 also has several smaller games and modes: "Jewel Drop" sees two players compete to match falling jewels by color without them toppling over, "Badminton Bash" features badminton gameplay for up to four players, and a tournament challenge consisting only of minigames.

== Development ==
Mario Party 10 was developed by NDcube, the developers of the previous entry.

Mario Party 10 was developed by NDcube, the developers of Mario Party 9, and published by Nintendo. Shuichiro Nishiya reprised his role as game director, and Jumpei Horita served as producer.

The developers reused the gameplay concept of having every player progress through the board together. They noticed how, in previous titles, anyone playing would stop paying attention if it was not their turn. By having every player progress together, their actions would affect the other players, thereby keeping everyone engaged. They also decreased the amount of text to help make the game move faster: before each minigame, the game plays a video demonstration instead of explaining the controls in writing, and the characters were made more expressive so their reactions would clue the players into what was happening without the need for text.

Ideas for minigames came from NDcube staff. The team involved with minigame creation took these ideas, usually just one-sentence descriptions or drawings, and expanded upon them or merge them with others. Inspiration was drawn from recent Mario games, including New Super Mario Bros. U and Super Mario 3D World. Nishiya, who was a part of the minigame team, observed his daily life and drew inspiration for minigame ideas from it. Prior Wii U party games from Nintendo, such as Nintendo Land and Wii Party U, featured Miis as the player characters, which kept minigames grounded to reality. To help Mario Party 10 stand out from these titles, the developers based the minigames on "surreal" concepts and environments.

One of the NDcube's goals in developing Mario Party 10 was to introduce concepts original to the series, including allowing Bowser, a recurring antagonist, to be playable and having the player compete against Mario. Another goal was to emphasize using the Wii U GamePad to allow for new ways of gameplay, which resulted in the Bowser Party game mode. When first envisioning the mode, the developers conceptualized a large Bowser on screen with Mario charging toward him on the GamePad. This idea evolved into the concept included in the game, where Bowser is controlled using the GamePad instead. They considered how Bowser would attack Mario and turned these concepts into minigames. The biggest challenge in creating Bowser Party was balancing, as Mario Party is a series based on luck, which resulted in either team getting too far ahead for the other side to catch up in their prototypes. Consequently, the development team gave the losing side an extra boost if they fell too far behind. The developers also wanted to utilize Nintendo's line of Amiibo products, so they created the Amiibo Party game mode. Although they believed that "the Bowser Party and Mario Party modes alone give Mario Party 10 an appeal that surpasses that of any of the previous installment", they wanted Amiibo Party to use Amiibo in a way that was more than just a novelty.

=== Release ===
Mario Party 10 was announced at E3 2014, detailing the gameplay, Bowser Party game mode, and select playable characters. The Amiibo line was also announced, and it was specified that Mario Party 10 would support them. Television ads for the game focused on the Bowser Party and Amiibo functionality. When Nintendo sponsored the 2015 Nickelodeon Kids' Choice Awards, the ceremony advertised Mario Party 10. In a January 2015 Nintendo Direct, Amiibo Party was announced alongside the list of compatible Amiibo. Mario Party 10 was released on March 12, 2015, in Japan and on March 20 in North America and Europe. A bundle including the game and a Mario Amiibo from the Super Mario line was released in limited quantities.

== Reception ==
Reception

Aggregate scores
Aggregator	Score
Metacritic	66/100
OpenCritic	16% recommend

Review scores
Publication	Score
Destructoid	6/10
Electronic Gaming Monthly	5/10
Famitsu	33/40
Game Informer	6/10
GameSpot	6/10
GamesRadar+	2.5/5
Hardcore Gamer	3/5
IGN	6.5/10
Nintendo Life	7/10
Nintendo World Report	6.5/10
PCMag	3/5
Shacknews	7/10
The Guardian	2/5
VentureBeat	60/100

=== Reviews ===
Mario Party 10 received "mixed or average reviews" according to the review aggregator website Metacritic, scoring a weighted average of 66/100. Fellow review aggregator OpenCritic assessed that the game received weak approval, being recommended by only 16% of critics. In Japan, four critics from Famitsu gave the game a total score of 33 out of 40. Some critics felt the game lacked adequate change from its predecessors.

The shorter runtime of rounds and its high-definition graphics were appreciated by critics, with Samuel Claiborn of IGN enjoying how much more discernible split-screen multiplayer was because of the latter. Kyle Hilliard of Game Informer also commended the graphics and highlighted the game's music, saying that "even the blandest remixes of Koji Kondo's assorted Nintendo scores are immensely enjoyable". Carter applauded the minigame variation, appreciating the variety of minigame controls that were more than shaking the Wii Remote, as was usually the case in Mario Party 9 and Mario Party 8, but criticized the lack of Bowser minigames in Bowser Party.

Ray Carsillo of Electronic Gaming Monthly considered the use of the Wii U GamePad to be lackluster in the Mario Party game mode, a sentiment Hilliard shared, especially compared to the GamePad's use in Nintendo Land. In contrast, Claiborn referred to Mario Party 10 as "one of the best uses of the Wii U GamePad yet", mainly for its use in Bowser Party. A common criticism was that Mario Party 10 continued disliked gameplay mechanics from Mario Party 9, mainly the vehicle mechanic. Destructoid's Chris Carter had become used to the gimmick but still considered it to be dull in comparison to individual movement, as it caused the game to lose variation as spaces on the board with uniques game mechanics can be easily passed over. He also criticized the lack of an ability to choose the length of each round. Other critics preferred the continued linear gameplay that was established in Mario Party 9 over that from prior series entries. Hilliard favored the progression as it sped up movement, an opinion shared with Nintendo Life's Martin Watts, who also cited a more tactical gameplay as moves directly affected the other players. Carsillo did not consider the continued trend of cooperative gameplay to be a negative, but he criticized the lack of variation between Mario Party 10 and Mario Party 9. He overall missed the competitive feel of previous titles in the series.

Bowser Party received a mixed reception. Hilliard lauded Bowser Party and considered it to be the best mode in the game for its emphasis on skill-based gameplay. Carter criticized Bowser Party for its linear progression, which often resulted in little interaction between the two teams as one would usually have an advantage or a string of luck that would keep a continuous distance between them. Carsillo also ridiculed Bowser Party for its lack of minigame variation and balance. Writing for GameSpot, Mark Walton considered Bowser to be the least entertaining role to play, mainly for the waiting times involved, but Claiborn called the role "a blast" because of its unique gameplay. Certain critics regarded Bowser Party as being the best mode in the game, which Dermot Creegan of Hardcore Gamer agreed on, but he still considered the mode "the most barren" with considerably fewer boards and minigames. Amiibo Party was received more positively overall but criticized for various technical reasons. Carter enjoyed the mode for its return to classic Mario Party rules but criticized the boards' size. Although he appreciated the detail found on each board in Amiibo Party, he criticized the necessity to purchase $100 worth of Amiibo in order to use all supported characters. While Hilliard initially enjoyed the function of scanning the Amiibo to move in Amiibo Party, he grew tired of continuously needing to do so after the novelty wore off. Walton generally enjoyed Amiibo Party but criticized it for not being much different from the Mario Party game mode, especially since Amiibo only change the game's look and not the gameplay.

=== Sales ===
In the United Kingdom, Mario Party 10 had the second-best launch in the series, behind Mario Party 8. In the United States, roughly 290,000 physical and downloaded copies had been sold by the end of March 2015. This was faster than Mario Party 9, which only sold 230,000 in around three weeks. In Japan, Mario Party 10 sold about 50,000 copies in its first week. As of September 30, 2022, the game has worldwide sales of 2.27 million copies and is the tenth-best-selling game on the Wii U.

== See also ==
- List of Wii U games
- List of party video games
- List of video games featuring Mario
- 2015 in video games
