= Birdo =

Fictional character in the Mario franchise

- Mario character
- Promotional art by Shigehisa Nakaue
- First appearance: Yume Kōjō: Doki Doki Panic (1987)
- Voiced by: English: Jeannie Elias (The Super Mario Bros. Super Show!); Jessica Chisum (Mario Tennis); Jen Taylor (Super Mario Advance); Japanese: Jun Donna (1996–1998)(BS Super Mario USA Satellaview broadcast; Rika and Akemi (BS Super Mario USA; Red and Green Birdo, respectively, via Satellaview); Kazumi Totaka (2003–present)

Birdo, known in Japanese as Catherine (Japanese: キャサリン, Hepburn: Kyasarin) is a character in Nintendo's Mario franchise. Her first appearance was as a boss character in Yume Kōjō: Doki Doki Panic (1987), which was localized for English-language audiences as Super Mario Bros. 2 (1988). Since then, Birdo has been a recurring character in various Mario franchise games making several cameo and playable appearances.

The English manual for Super Mario Bros. 2 describes Birdo as a character who identifies as female and prefers to be called Birdetta. This has led to Birdo being interpreted as transgender by several video game publications, and she is seen as one of the earliest transgender characters in video games. Nintendo has generally avoided commenting on Birdo's gender in games released after her debut, though some games, such as Captain Rainbow (2008), do discuss her gender. She has been described as a transgender icon, though the handling of her gender in the Mario series has been met with a mixed response. She has made several appearances in other media as well as in promotional material for the series.

== Concept and creation ==
Birdo is a pink, anthropomorphic dinosaur-like creature who wears a red hairbow and has a round mouth that can fire eggs as projectiles. Birdo's name was mistakenly switched with another Super Mario Bros. 2 (1988) enemy, Ostro, in the game's end credits and its instruction manual.

The Japanese manual for Yume Kōjō: Doki Doki Panic (1987) states her name to be Catherine and is a male who thinks of himself as female. Text in the first edition manual for the North American release of Super Mario Bros. 2 stated that Birdo would "rather be called 'Birdetta'" and "he thinks he is a girl". Due to this, she is widely considered to be one of the first transgender characters in video games. In later printings, mention of Birdo being male was omitted. Mention of this fact is further not included in most later games featuring the character. Birdo has been variously referred to as male, female, and of indeterminate gender in her various re-appearances. Birdo has additionally been voiced with both feminine and masculine voices in different mediums. Birdo appears in the Wii game Captain Rainbow (2008) which delves into Birdo's gender identity. Due to conflicting sources regarding her gender, her gender identity has been of some debate among gamers, and though Birdo has been "increasingly feminized" as the series progressed, the depiction of Birdo's gender has fluctuated wildly across various media.

== Appearances ==
Birdo is a character in the Mario video game franchise. She made her first appearance in the Family Computer Disk System video game Yume Kōjō: Doki Doki Panic (1987). The game was later localized for Western audiences in the form of Super Mario Bros. 2 (1988). In the game, she acts as a boss opponent.

Birdo has made frequent appearances in later Mario games, acting as a boss opponent in games such as Super Mario RPG (1996), and Mario & Luigi: Superstar Saga (2003). She is a playable character in various Mario sports games, including games such as Mario Tennis (2000) Mario Golf: Toadstool Tour, (2003) Mario Tennis Aces, (2018) and Mario Strikers: Battle League (2022). Birdo additionally acted as a playable character several times in the Mario Kart series of racing games. She has had roles in other Mario franchise games, such as the puzzle video game Wario's Woods (1994). She also cameos as an unlockable costume for Mario in the video game Super Mario Maker (2015), and appears in the RPG game Paper Mario: The Origami King (2020) as part of an in-universe stage play.

Birdo additionally appears in Captain Rainbow (2008), where she is one of the many "B-List" Nintendo characters who inhabit the game's main location, Mimin Island. In the game, Birdo is imprisoned for using the women's bathroom, and needs Captain Rainbow to retrieve her vibrator in order to prove that she is a woman. This is the last time Birdo's gender history was mentioned in a video game.

Birdo appears as a villain in the animated film The Super Mario Galaxy Movie (2026), accompanied by other bosses from Super Mario Bros. 2.

== Critical reception ==
Though the manual excerpt from Super Mario Bros. 2 about Birdo's gender did not receive attention until some time after the game's release, Birdo has been the subject of discussion relating to her gender identity, being credited as an example of an early transgender character in video games due to her perceived gender identity. Numerous petitions from fans have called for Nintendo to recognize the transgender status of the character.

Jake Hall of TechRadar described Birdo's ongoing popularity in online communities, noting how Birdo's status as a transgender icon stemmed from the fact that Birdo served as a comforting character sought out by transgender communities in order to have a visible icon, stating that it helped to celebrate how transgender communities have always existed. Sam Greer, writing for GamesRadar+, was critical of Birdo's portrayal, stating that her gender had become a "running joke" and was the "subject of much derision and stereotyping." The book 100 Greatest Video Game Characters analyzed Birdo's storyline in Captain Rainbow and how it represented the struggles of transgender people in real life for proper representation. They stated that by showing how Birdo was accepted as female by the characters of the Mario universe, it emphasized hope for proper inclusion and representation in the real world. However, it criticized how, by proving Birdo was female in Captain Rainbow's story, and via how Birdo had to partake in stereotypically feminine actions in order to be accepted as female, it reinforced the concept of gender being a forced binary choice on transgender people, instead of transgender people being allowed to make the choice of who they were for themselves.

Stacey Henley of TheGamer stated that Birdo was a highly important character for transgender representation, as she represented the struggles and stereotypes of transgender people in real life. She described how Nintendo seemed "ashamed of Birdo's past" and that despite Nintendo's disinterest, Birdo was described as a "landmark piece of representation" within the transgender community that acted "[as] a metaphor for the community's own representation on screen." Paste's Jennifer Unkle criticized Birdo as a caricatured trans person and as an example of Nintendo's poor handling of gender identity in general. Zackari Greif of Game Rant also criticized Nintendo's handling of the character, citing multiple occasions where Birdo was referred to with male pronouns instead of female ones, as well as how Birdo is constantly referred to as "Birdo" and not "Birdetta", which is stated to be Birdo's preferred name in the Super Mario Bros. 2 manual. He felt that Birdo needed consistent and proper respectful treatment as a trans woman in the games as a result. The book Queerness in Play analyzed how Birdo remained an important and iconic transgender character in video gaming, stating that the ignorance towards Birdo's gender in games served as a degree of transphobia. It compared Birdo to the androgynous character Kirby, comparing how Kirby's lack of gender-related signifiers made Kirby a comforting character who was "superior to humanity", while Birdo's embracement of them led to Birdo being viewed as "threatening mystery" due to being more human-like in how she expressed her gender.

Author Megan Blythe Adams found Nintendo's differing interpretation of Birdo's gender to be an echo of the cultural contexts in media in Japan; specifically, the new-half phenomena, a media spectacle in Japan that focused on male-to-female transgender sex workers that appeared in media at the time of Super Mario Bros. 2's release. They stated that its usage within Birdo's character "reinforce[d] the long-standing assumption that transgender performance was something situated in the entertainment world, not in real life." Lorenzo Fantoni, writing for Vice, compared the Captain Rainbow scene to the later bathroom debates regarding transgender people. Fantoni also suggested that Nintendo does not know what to do with Birdo, believing that changes to Birdo's character were made in order to match present-day morals.
