= Game board =

Surface on which a board game is played

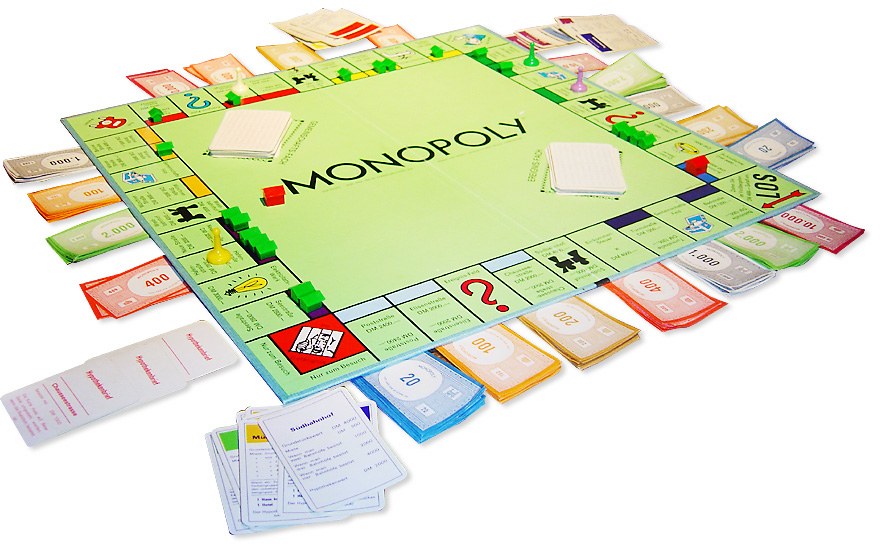
Game board for Monopoly, a popular modern game

A game board (or gameboard; sometimes, playing board or game map) is the surface on which one plays a board game.

The oldest known game boards may date to Neolithic times; however, some scholars argue these may not have been game boards at all. Early Bronze Age artifacts are more universally recognized as game boards (for games such as Egyptian senet and mehen, and the Mesopotamian Royal Game of Ur). Most ancient board games were race games, utilizing random outcome generators like dice.

Game boards evolved in complexity and design, with early examples featuring various shapes before the quadrilateral grid became common for abstract games. They serve as the primary interaction zone for players and can range from simple to highly elaborate, sometimes incorporating three-dimensional or electronic components. Modern board games often illustrated modular or customizable boards, enhancing replay-ability and player engagement.

== History ==
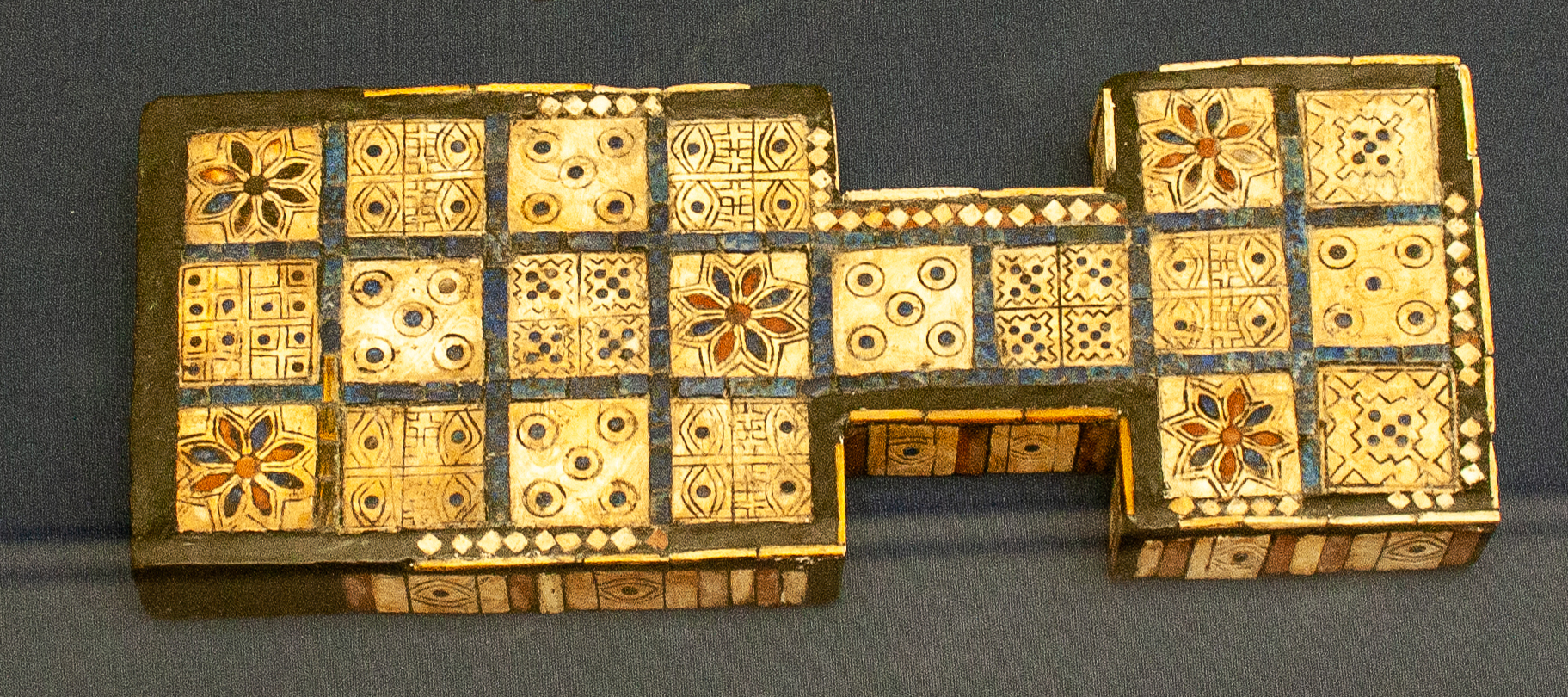
One of the five game boards for Royal Game of Ur found by Sir Leonard Woolley in the Royal Cemetery at Ur, now held in the British Museum, dated to c. 2500 BCE

The history of game boards is a topic closely related to history of board games. However, not all games classified as board games actually feature game boards. While game boards would seem to be a necessary and sufficient condition of the genre, card games that do not use a standard deck of cards (as well as games that use neither cards nor a game board) are often colloquially included, with some scholars therefore referring to said genre as that of "table and board games" or "tabletop games". Games using random outcome generators (dice games, today often classified as board games) likely existed before the invention of board games featuring actual game boards.

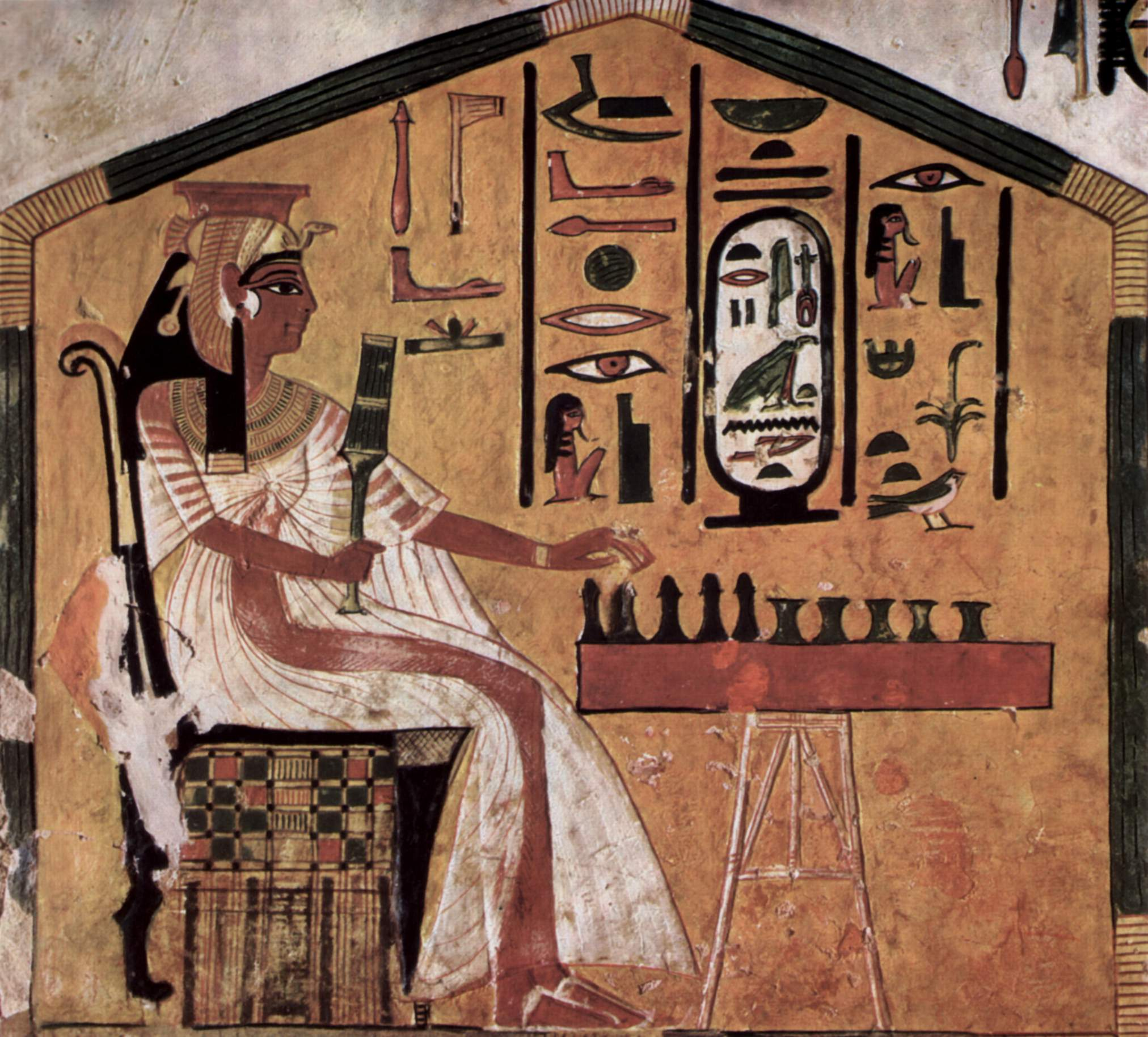
Painting in tomb of Egyptian queen Nefertari playing a board game (commonly identified as senet) on a game board with game pieces, c. 1295–1255 BCE

The oldest known game boards were made from stone (game boards made from less durable materials might have existed as well but have not survived until the modern era). Understanding of ancient board games is difficult, as artifacts from such time are often incomplete (smaller accompanying pieces are rarely found), and lack accompanying rules; in many cases even the original name of the game has been lost to time. According to Gary O. Rollefson and St John Simpson, the oldest known game boards date to Neolithic dwellings as old as ~6990 BCE (Beidha) and ~5870 BCE (ʿAin Ghazal). They were made from durable materials like limestone, and are likely related to mancala-style games.

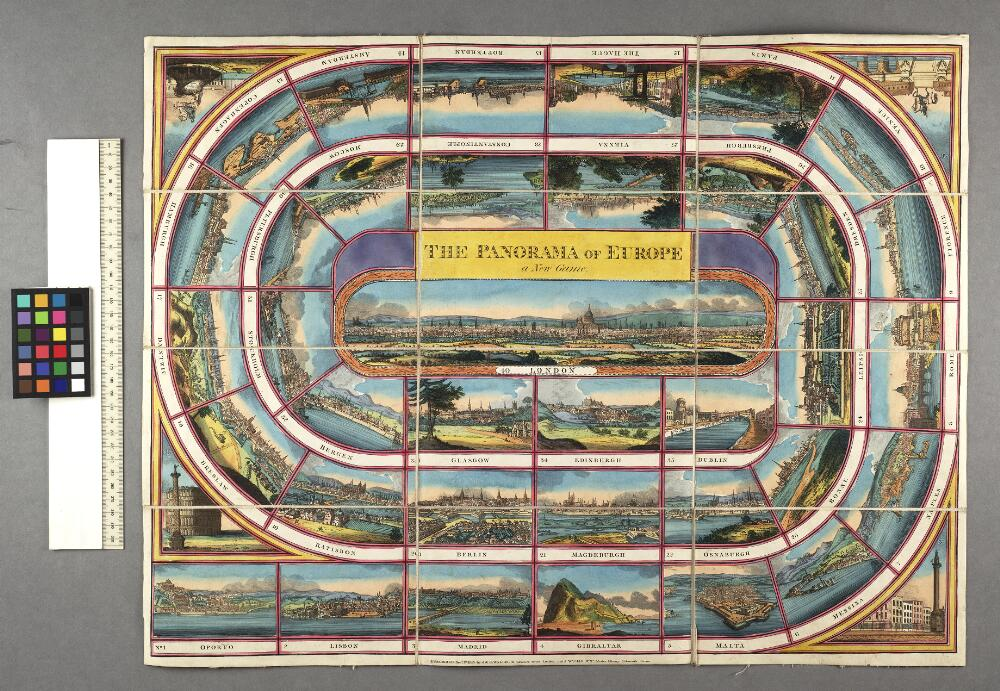
An illustrated game board for a 1815 game Panorama of Europe

Thierry Depaulis has however criticized description of these artifacts as game boards, arguing that they look unpractical for that purpose, no expected gaming pieces nor dice were found to accompany the boards, and the concept of mostly abstract board games was likely too complex for the people of that period. Instead, he suggests those devices were intended for fire making.

Very few if any similar objects have been found in the archeological evidence from sites linked to the Neolithic and Bronze Age eras (one artifact resembling a chess board, dated to c. 3500 BCE from Tell Majnuna site in Syria, exists, although it might have been a proto-calculator). The next generation of artifacts more universally acknowledged as game boards, also more complex than the possible mancala-styled boards, are dated to the Early Bronze Age period around the Mediterranean and include those for Egyptian senet and mehen from ~3000 - 2000 BCE and similar ones from Mesopotamia (Fertile Crescent region). The Royal Game of Ur from c. 2500 BCE has often been called one of the oldest board games. Fragments of game boards for unidentified board games, made from terracotta and stone, have also been found at sites related to the Indus Valley Civilization of similar age.

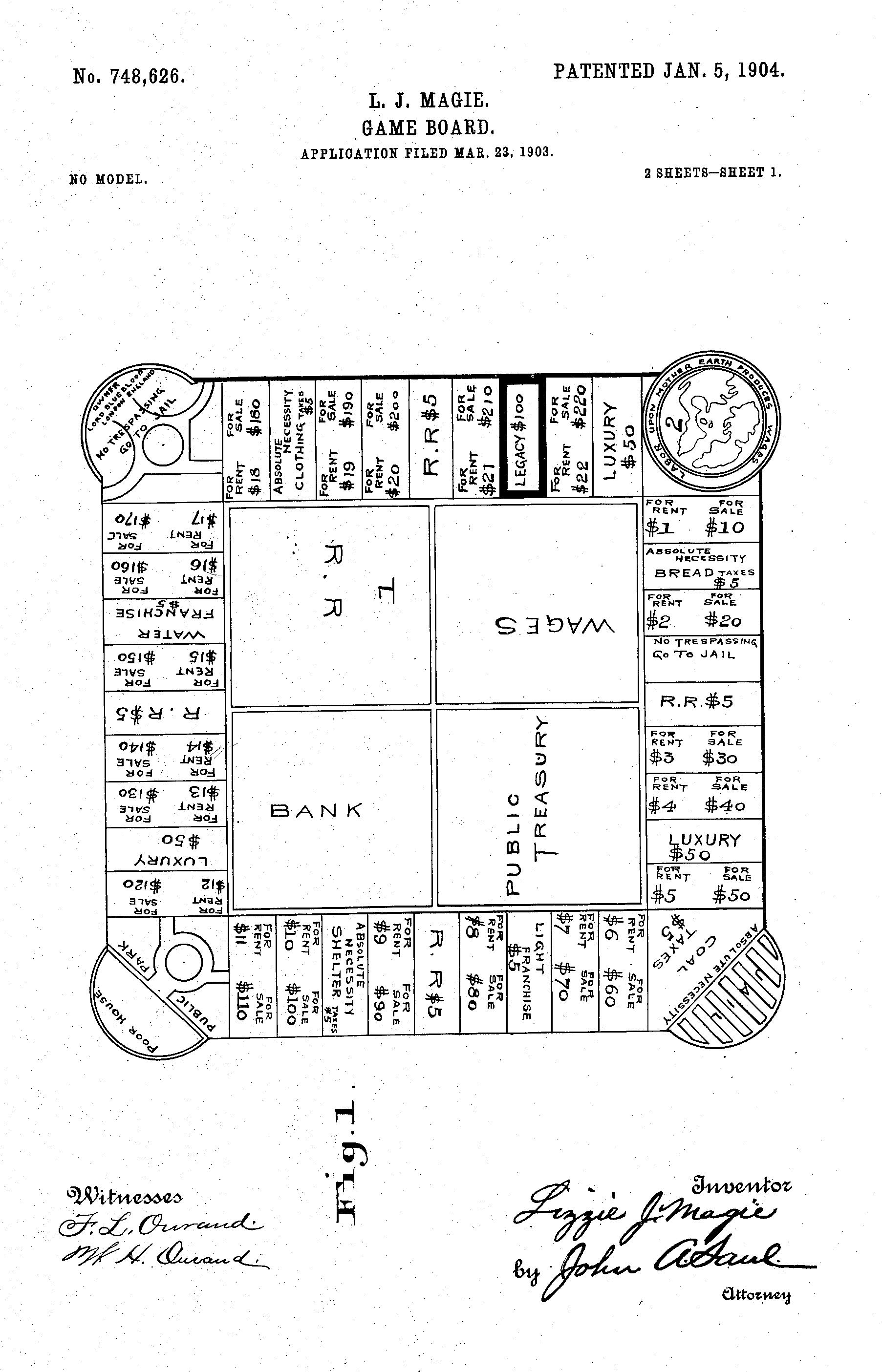
Patent named "Drawing for a Game Board" for Lizzie Magie's 1904 The Landlord's Game which was a predecessor of Monopoly

Depaulis argues that most if not all board games from that era were race games, which he defines as "board games played with a random generator – dice of all kinds", and which feature a linear if bent "race track" on which game pieces have to move (race) from one end to the other. He cites backgammon as the best known modern example of such a game. He notes the earliest game confirmed as having different rules to be a "Greek game of polis (πόλις), which appears in the literature around 450 BCE, and the more or less contemporary Chinese game of weiqi ('go'), which, under the name of yi (弈), is mentioned in Confucius's Analects (Lunyu) compiled between ca 470/50 and 280 BCE." Texts referring to the origins of chess date from the beginning of the seventh century.

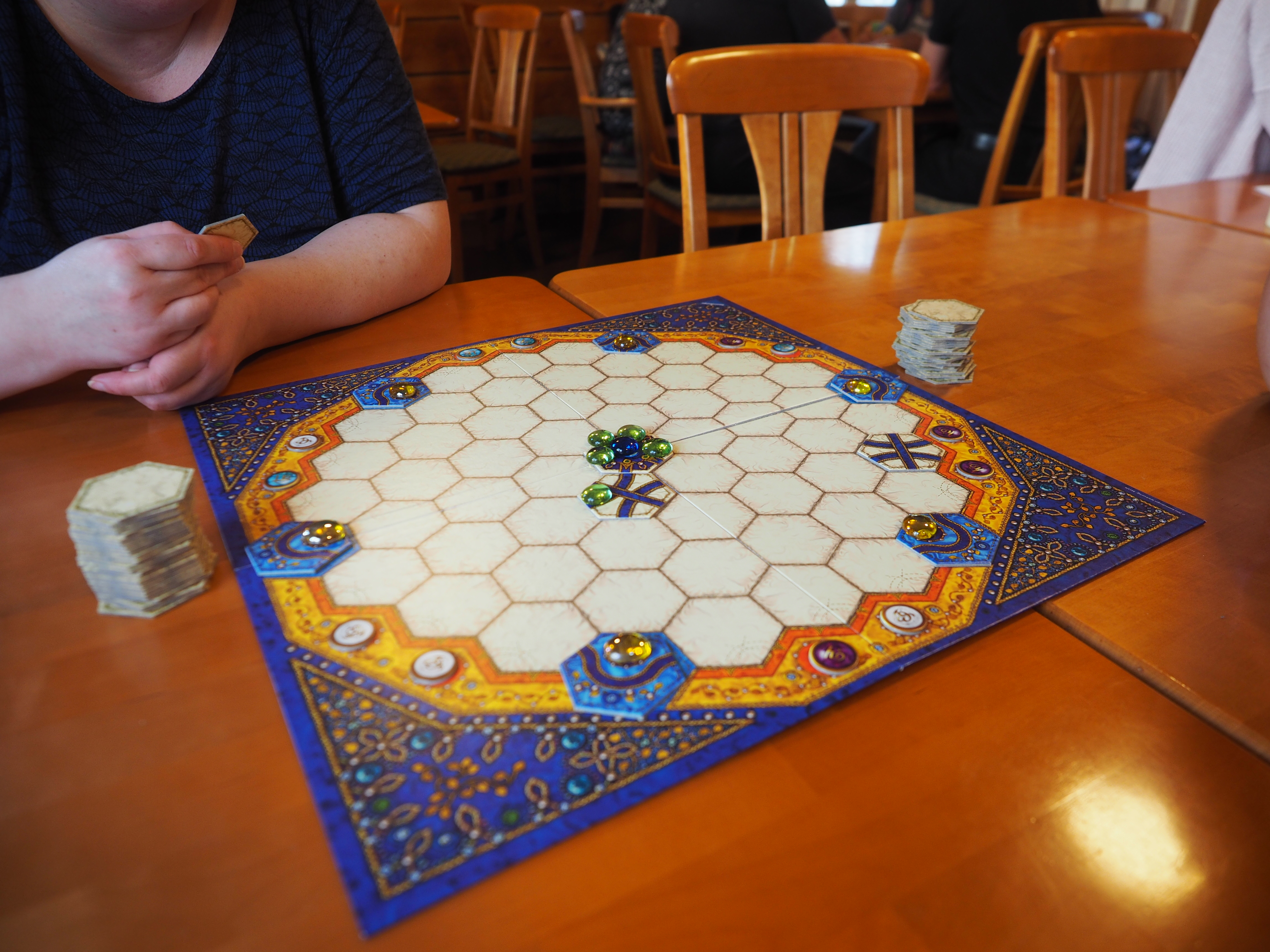
Game board with initial setup for Indigo, a modern (2012) game

Early game boards came in a variety of shapes (for example, senet's game board was made of three parallel rows, while mehen's was based on a spiral form); a quadrilateral (square) shape with grids became common only later, with the emergence of strategy games.

In China, game boards were not often illustrated until around the 19th century.

Board games made in the early 1800s started to feature maps of real locations (ex. Walker's Tour of France from 1815).

The 1963 Mouse Trap is recognized as one of the first mass-produced board games with a three-dimensional game board.

Avalon Hill's wargame PanzerBlitz from 1970 was the first game to include a geomorphic map which allowed players to reconfigure sections of the game board, an innovation that became reused on many later titles.

== Characteristics ==
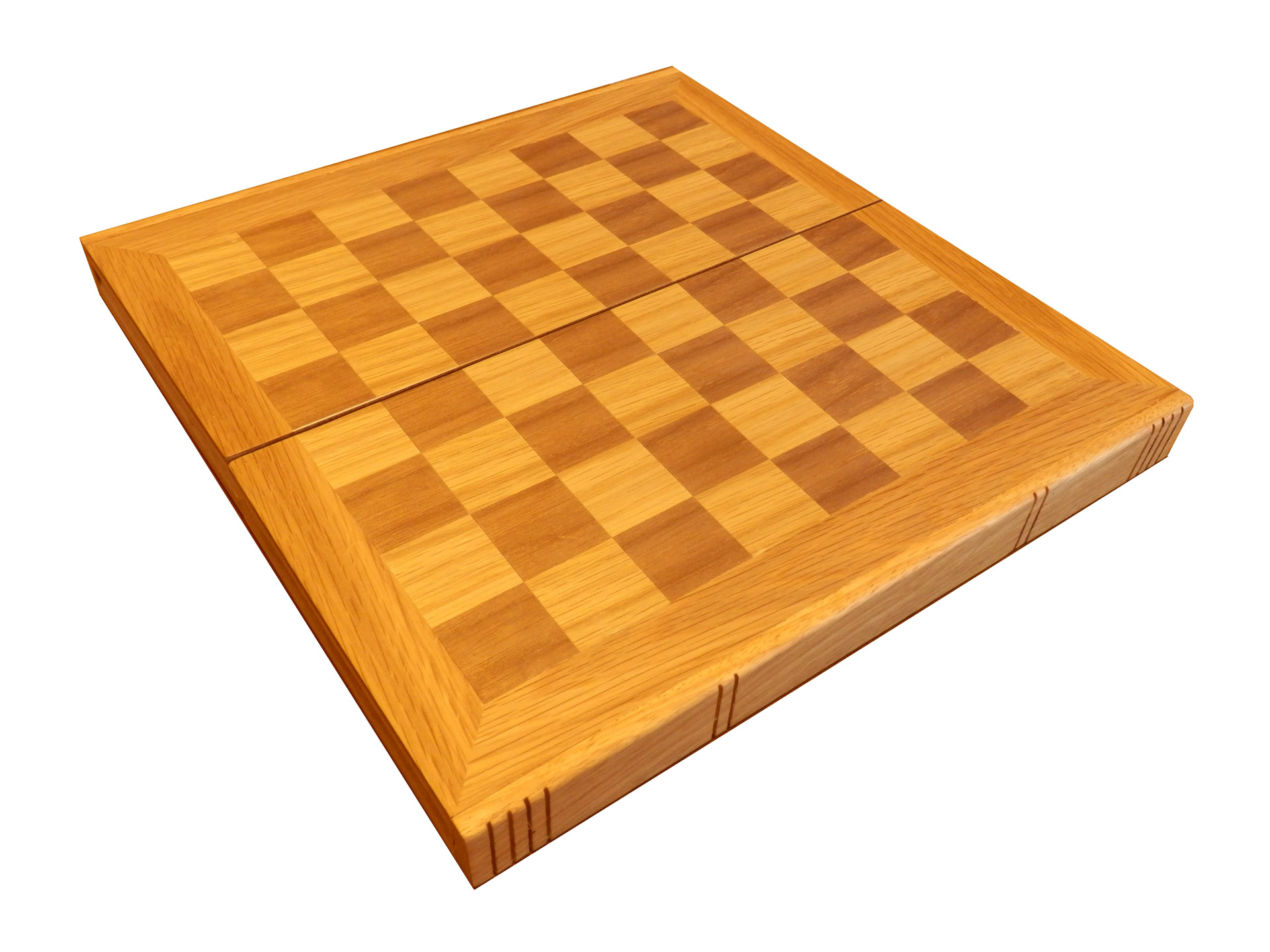
A classic chessboard

The game board provides a shared space for the game components and visually communicates some rules to the players. Most interactions between players in a board game take place on the game board, making it the most important zone of play. By drawing player attention to itself, the game board is an important part of the "magic circle" (suspension of reality) created by the game.

Game boards have varying level of complexity, abstraction and aesthetics. Some can be very simple (ex. traditional checkered chess board or Pictionary), others can be very complex, thematic and incorporate numerous pieces of artwork (ex. Shadows over Camelot). Some game boards have been called "just plain beautiful". A common theme for game boards is a map depicting the conceptual area where the action of a board game happens (a world, a city, a house, a ship, etc.). Extensions of the game board are sometimes called a side board; they are often used to track points.

Some game boards can be quickly improvised using pen and paper or drawn on the ground. Some can be three-dimensional or include props such as landscape elements (volcanos, walls, or such - see for example Mouse Trap or Fireball Island). Some modern game boards have electrical components (ex. Mall Madness). Some have both; for example Dark Tower from 1981 had both 3D and electrical components. Most modern game boards are larger than an A4 sheet of paper; some are folded or assembled from smaller components.Game boards can have numerous features, most often color-coded spaces for other game pieces. Common types of game board spaces in modern games include worker spaces (for worker placement mechanic), resource and card spaces (for storing and collecting relevant components) and spawn places (for generating components). Such spaces are tied to game rules and mechanics influencing where pieces can be placed or how they can move. Reaching certain parts of the game board or map can be related to winning the game; this is common in games featuring a grid. Game boards that have grids are sometimes called maps, although there are many exceptions (e.g., chess or checkers). Other common elements of game boards include tracks for moving pieces. A common type of track is a victory track for counting score that is often placed around the edge of the board. Some games may be built around game board–centric concepts such as route building or pattern recognition, or the game play can be even focused on adjusting the shape of the game board (ex. Carcassone, in which players build the game board by laying down map tiles).

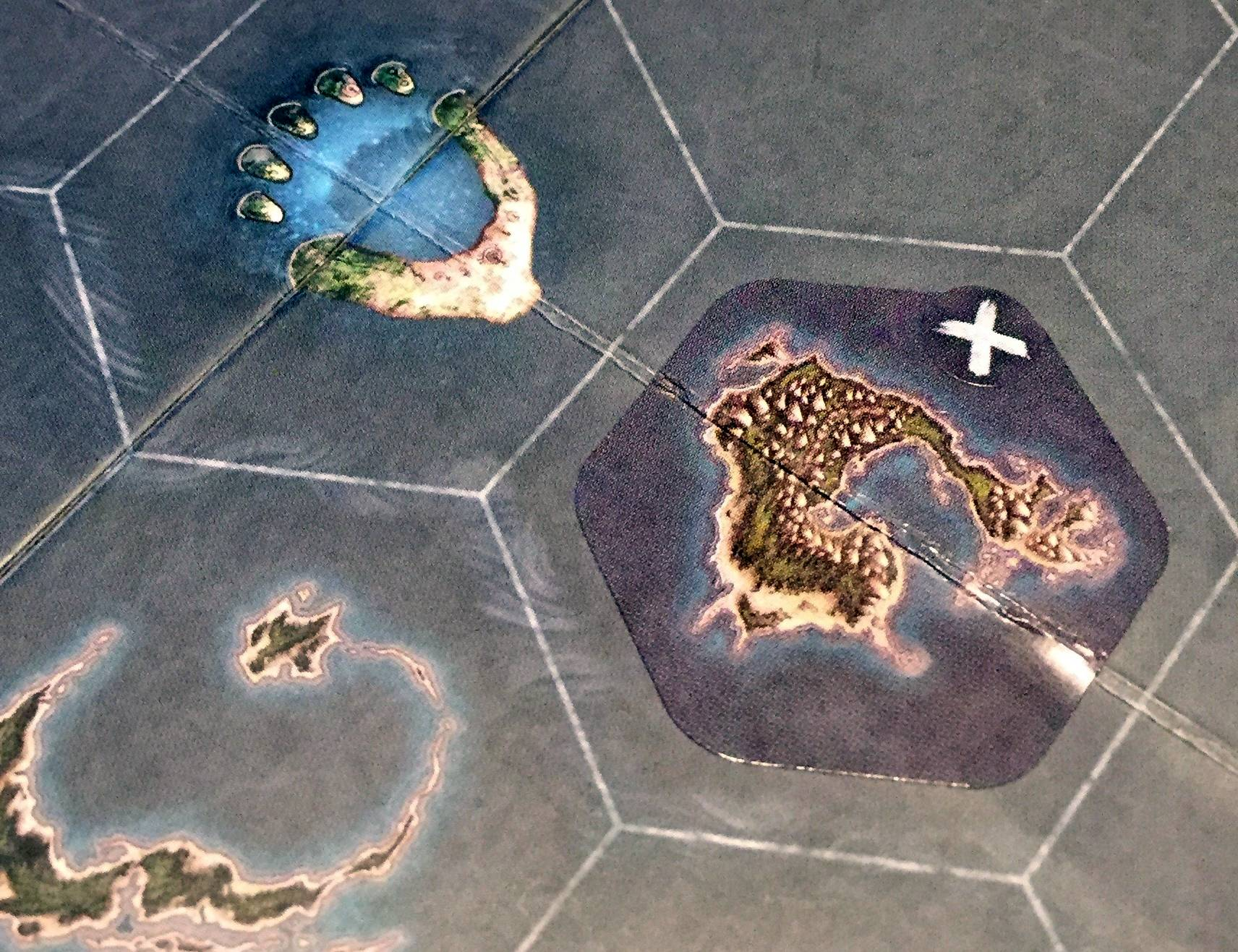
Two stickers - an island hex and a cross marker - added permanently to the game board in a game of SeaFall. Such additions are prevalent in legacy-style games.

Most games use a standardized and unchanging board, usually quadrilateral (chess, go, and backgammon each have such a board), but some games use a modular board whose component tiles or cards can assume varying layouts from one session to another, or even during gameplay (ex. Betrayal at House on the Hill or Descent: Journeys in the Dark). Some games have no limits on board (map) building and expansion and may be realistically only limited by a playing surface or availability of game pieces, and each game play can result in a creation of a unique game board. In particular wargames such as Star Wars: X- Wing Miniatures Game or Warhammer 40,000 can be played on surfaces such as tables, maps or three-dimensional dioramas. Some innovative games have used storybook pages as gameplay maps (ex. Mice and Mystics) or pop-up book mechanic. Some games can feature map reduction (shrinkage) as game progresses, or deformation (mechanics where parts of game board may shift, rotate or otherwise move). Some games feature boards that are double-sided and flappable. Legacy games like SeaFall allow permanent customization of game boards through the use of stickers or other markers.

== See also ==
- Games table desk – Desk with board game pattern
- Hex map – Map subdivided into a hexagonal tiling, small regular hexagons of identical size
- Meeple – Small wooden human-like board-game piece
- Play money – Currency used in games
