= Unmatched (board game) =

Tabletop game

- Designers: Noah Cohen, Rob Daviau, Justin D. Jacobson, Chris Leder, Brian Neff
- Publishers: Restoration Games
- Materials required: Card and miniatures game

Unmatched is a tabletop game published by Restoration Games and formerly Mondo Tees in which two to four players use a combination of miniatures and cards to compete in a skirmish-style battle. Playable characters are drawn from mythology and pop-culture, with fighters ranging from Robin Hood to Bigfoot, Buffy the Vampire Slayer, Sherlock Holmes, and others. The game was originally released in September 2019.

== Development ==
Unmatched was developed as a collaboration between Restoration Games, known for updating and redesigning old and out of print board games, and Mondo Tees, known for movie posters, t-shirts, and other collectibles. The game is based on the out-of-print games Star Wars Epic Duels from Milton Bradley and Tannhäuser from Fantasy Flight Games. Each character features a miniature along with a unique deck of original art for that character. The game was initially available for sale at Gen Con in August 2019, where the entire early run sold out. The first three Unmatched sets were released to retail stores in September 2019.

In July 2020, Restoration Games held a deck design contest where fans could submit their own decks. They received over three hundred entries. In March 2021, the first winners were announced: The Genie, Houdini, Rosie the Riveter and Shakespeare. It was later stated that Oda Nobunaga and Tomoe Gozen were entries and future sets such as Battle of Legends, Volume 3 will include more entries.

At Gen Con 2026, during their "Blueprints" presentation, Restoration Games announced that, after their previously announced Hellboy set, they will be working on three new projects: Once Upon a Time, a fairy tale-themed set designed to be an entry point for new Unmatched players; A Study in Terror, the third iteration of the Unmatched Adventures system; and Slay the Spire, based on the video game of the same name.

== Gameplay ==
Before the game starts, players each choose a fighter and select a battle map for the match. Players are free to mix fighters and maps from different sets. During a game of Unmatched, players take turns using a combination of cards and actions to move their fighters around the map, attack opponents and perform other actions. Players win by reducing every opposing fighter to zero health. The game can be played one-on-one, two-on-two, or as a free-for-all. Most fighters also have one or more sidekicks, represented by plastic tokens, which are able to move around the board, attack, and defend. Each map is divided up into color-coded zones, which are used to determine whether a ranged attacker has line of sight to an enemy, and also when resolving some card effects. Combat is resolved by declaring an attack against a fighter that is either adjacent to your character or within line of sight for ranged attackers. The attacker chooses an attack card and plays it face down. If the defending player chooses to defend and has a defense card available, they may play it facedown. Attack and defense cards are then revealed. If the attack value is higher than the defense value, the target of the attack takes the difference in damage. If the attack deals no damage, the defender is considered the winner of that combat. Attack and defense cards may have additional abilities that resolve as soon as they're revealed, before damage is assigned, or after damage is assigned.

== Unmatched Adventures ==
In March 2023, Restoration Games announced the first Unmatched Adventures set, Tales to Amaze, which features two villains (Mothman and Martian Invader) along with a host of minions for a cooperative play adventure, which allows for a whole new way to play the game. There are six villain minions in Tales to Amaze: Jersey Devil, Ant Queen, The Blob, Skunk Ape, Loveland Frog, and Tarantula. All of the villains function by turning over a card from their deck to see what attack or defense they play. After a successful Kickstarter, the game is now available on Restoration Games website. In November 2025, another Adventures set released: Teenage Mutant Ninja Turtles, featuring the Teenage Mutant Ninja Turtles fighting off villains Shredder and Krang, with minions including Bebop & Rocksteady, Baxter Stockman, Wingnut, Leatherhead, Slash, and Rat King. This multiplayer box of Unmatched is unique in that the villains also function as playable characters, unlike the villains in Tales to Amaze

== Components ==
Unmatched is played using a deck of cards unique to each character, plastic miniatures representing fighters, plastic tokens used to represent sidekicks, dials to track character health, and battle maps. Every set with two or more characters includes at least one battle map. Characters and maps from different sets can be combined and used together.

== Sets ==
=== Unmatched ===
| Set | Release | Hero(es) (w/ Sidekicks) | Battle Maps |
|---|---|---|---|
| Battle of Legends, Volume One | September 2019 | Medusa (w/ Harpies); King Arthur (w/ Merlin); Alice (w/ The Jabberwock); Sinbad (w/ The Porter) | Sarpedon; Marmoreal |
| Robin Hood vs. Bigfoot | October 2019 | Robin Hood (w/ Outlaws); Bigfoot (w/ The Jackalope) | Sherwood Forest; Yukon |
| Bruce Lee (Note: This set is currently out of print.) | October 2019 | Bruce Lee | N/A |
| Jurassic Park — InGen vs. Raptors | April 2020 | Robert Muldoon (w/ InGen Workers); Raptors (Note: These are three heroes with separate heath discs; all must be defeated to win.) | Raptor Paddock |
| Cobble & Fog | July 2020 | Invisible Man; Jekyll & Hyde; Dracula (w/ Sisters); Sherlock Holmes (w/ Dr. Watson) | Soho; Baskerville Manor |
| Buffy the Vampire Slayer | October 2020 | Buffy (w/ Xander or Giles); Spike (w/ Drusilla); Willow (w/ Tara); Angel (w/ Faith) | The Bronze; Sunnydale High |
| Little Red Riding Hood vs. Beowulf | December 2020 | Little Red (w/ Huntsman); Beowulf (w/ Wiglaf) | Heorot |
| Marvel — Deadpool | July 2021 | Deadpool | N/A |
| Battle of Legends, Volume Two | January 2022 | Sun Wukong (w/ Clones); Yennenga (w/ Archers); Achilles (w/ Patroclus); Bloody Mary | Hanging Gardens |
| Marvel — Hell's Kitchen | April 2022 | Daredevil; Elektra (w/ The Hand); Bullseye | Hell's Kitchen |
| Marvel — Redemption Row | April 2022 | Luke Cage (w/ Misty Knight); Ghost Rider; Moon Knight (Note: This hero switches "personalities" between Moon Knight, Mr. Knight, and Khonshu, each with their own separate power, but sharing a health disc.) | The Raft |
| Jurassic Park — Dr. Sattler vs. T. Rex | May 2022 | Dr. Ellie Sattler (w/ Dr. Ian Malcolm); T. Rex (Note: This a considered a "big fighter.") | T. Rex Paddock |
| Houdini vs. The Genie | December 2022 | Houdini (w/ Bess) | King Solomon's Mines |
| Marvel — Teen Spirit | March 2023 | Squirrel Girl (w/ Squirrels (Note: These are considered "small fighters.")); Cloak & Dagger (Note: These are two heroes with separate health discs; both must be defeated to win.); Ms. Marvel | Navy Pier |
| Marvel — For King and Country | April 2023 | Black Widow (w/ Maria Hill); Black Panther (w/ Shuri); Winter Soldier | Helicarrier |
| Marvel — Brains and Brawn | June 2023 | She-Hulk; Doctor Strange (w/ Wong); Spider-Man | Sanctum Sanctorum |
| Sun's Origin | January 2024 | Oda Nobunaga (w/ Honor Guard); Tomoe Gozen | Azuchi Castle |
| Slings and Arrows | March 2024 | Shakespeare (w/ Actors); Titania (w/ Oberon); Hamlet (w/ Rosencrantz & Guildenstern (Note: Despite representing two characters, they are treated as one fighter.)); The Wayward Sisters | Globe Theatre |
| The Witcher — Steel & Silver | December 2024 | Geralt of Rivia (w/ Dandelion); Ciri (w/ Ihuarraquax); Ancient Leshen (w/ Wolves) | Kaer Morhen; Fayrlund Forest |
| The Witcher — Realms Fall | December 2024 | Yennefer & Triss (Note: The player chooses which of the two characters is the hero, while the other is the sidekick.); Eredin (w/ Red Riders); Philippa (w/ Dijkstra) | Streets of Novigrad; Naglfar |
| Battle of Legends, Volume Three | July 2025 | Blackbeard (w/ Sea Dogs); Chupacabra; Pandora (w/ Kakodæmons); Loki | Venice; Santa's Workshop |
| Teenage Mutant Ninja Turtles — Shredder vs. Krang (Note: This set requires components from Unmatched Adventures: Teenage Mutant Ninja Turtles.) | September 2025 | Shredder (w/ Bebop & Rocksteady); Krang | N/A |
| Lee vs. Ali | October 2025 | Bruce Lee; Muhammad Ali | Tsing Shan Monastery; Thrilla in Manila |
| Stars and Stripes | March 2026 | Wyatt Earp (w/ Doc Holliday); Rosie the Riveter (w/ Wendy the Welder); John Henry; George Washington (w/ Culper Spies) | The Alamo; The White House |
| Hellboy | October 2026 | Hellboy (w/ Lobster Johnson); Liz Sherman; Abe Sapien (w/ B.P.R.D. Agents); Baba Yaga (w/ Koshchei) | B.P.R.D. HQ; Pandemonium |
| Once Upon a Time | TBA 2027 | Big Bad Wolf; Mulan; Snow White; Pinocchio | TBA |
| Slay the Spire | TBA 2028 | TBA | TBA |

=== Unmatched Adventures ===
| Set | Release | Heroes (and Sidekicks) | Villains | Minions | Battle Maps |
|---|---|---|---|---|---|
| Tales to Amaze | August 2023 | Annie Christmas (w/ Charlie); Dr. Jill Trent (w/ Daisy); Golden Bat; Nikola Tesla | Mothman; Martian Invader | Loveland Frog; Ant Queen; Skunk Ape; The Blob; Tarantula; Jersey Devil | Point Pleasant; McMinnville, OR |
| Teenage Mutant Ninja Turtles | September 2025 | Leonardo (w/ Splinter); Donatello (w/ Metalhead); Michelangelo (w/ April O'Neil); Raphael (w/ Casey Jones) | Shredder; Krang | Baxter Stockman; Bebop & Rocksteady; Slash; Leatherhead; Rat King; Wingnut | New York City; Technodrome |
| A Study in Terror | TBA 2027 | TBA | TBA | TBA | TBA |

== Reception ==
Unmatched has received praise for its easy-to-learn rules and beautiful graphic design. Charlie Hall wrote for Polygon that "what makes the game truly stand apart is the quality and cohesiveness of its art and design." Matthew Smail of Big Boss Battle described Unmatched as "a superbly made game both in terms of its production and more importantly, it's [sic] mechanics." IGN's Matt Thrower wrote that "Every set in the Unmatched series is a masterclass in the art of doing a great deal with very little." and also noted that matches can begin to feel repetitive after several games.
