= SeaFall =

Board game

Seafall
- Designers: Rob Daviau
- Illustrators: Jared Blando, Brian Valeza
- Publishers: Plaid Hat Games (2016)
- Genres: 4X
- Systems: Legacy
- Players: 3–5
- Setup time: 10 minutes
- Playing time: 90-120 minutes
- Chance: Moderate
- Skills: Strategy, tactics, logic, logistics

SeaFall is a board game designed by Rob Daviau and published in 2016 by Plaid Hat Games. SeaFall is a game of colonial era exploration which uses a legacy format, meaning the board and components change during each game, creating a different game each time and a story with a beginning, middle, and end. The game is played by 3–5 players, each of whom takes on the role of a province taking to the seas after a long dark age. Players explore the game board with their ships, revealing islands and other surprises. The game contains 430 entries in a Captain's Booke, a journal which is read in sections when players trigger in-game events called milestones. The story contains about 15 games' worth of content, with each game taking about two hours to play.

The release of the game was originally announced in 2013, and its release was repeatedly delayed. Many called it the most anticipated board game of 2016, coming on the heels of Pandemic Legacy: Season 1, an extremely popular legacy format game designed by Daviau and Matt Leacock that was released the year before.

== Gameplay ==
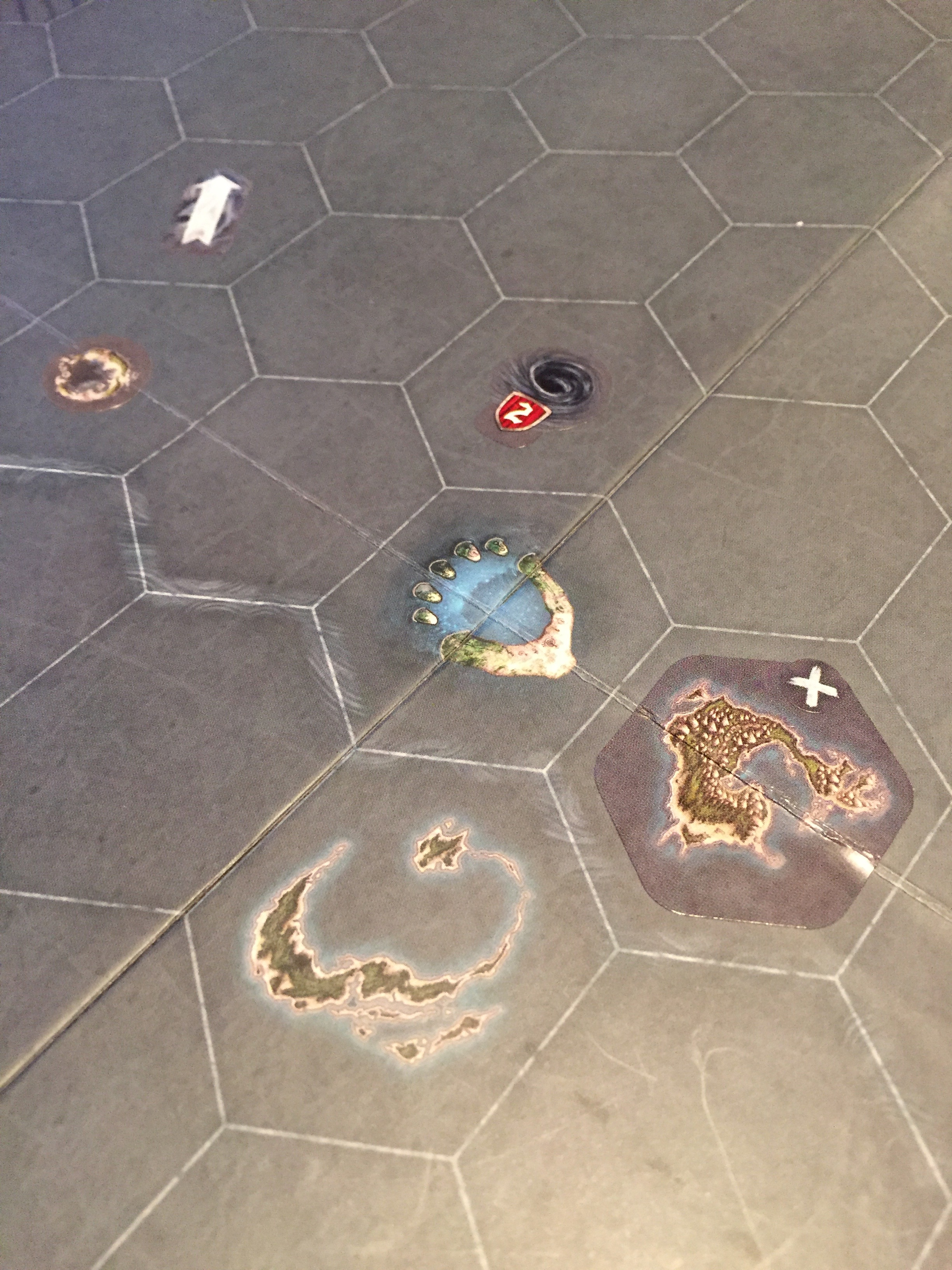
Stickers added to the game board

Set in an approximation of our world coming out of the Dark Ages, each player takes on the role of a mainland empire that is rediscovering seafaring technology and setting out to explore the world. Through the use of a team of advisors, each player discovers islands, develops trade, acquires resources and technology, and initiates conflict.

SeaFall evolves from one game to the next using a legacy system developed previously by Daviau in his Risk Legacy and Pandemic Legacy: Season 1 games. The components of the game itself will change, as islands the players discover on the map will be marked with stickers, and players' actions in a game will trigger events, which cause sealed packets to be opened which contain new pieces, cards and rules to be revealed. There is a Captain's Booke which contains 430 Choose Your Own Adventure-style narrative entries, which are read when players trigger certain milestones. Over the approximately 15 games which constitutes the campaign, a story develops which has narrative arc with a beginning, middle, and end.

Players have choices over how to pursue victory, with military aggression, exploration, and mercantilism all being viable strategies.
