= Machi Koro =

2012 City-management board game

- American version
- Designers: Masao Suganuma
- Illustrators: Noboru Hotta
- Publishers: Grounding
- Publication: around October/December 2012
- Genres: Card game Dice game City-building game
- Languages: Chinese, Czech, Dutch, English, French, German, Greek, Italian, Japanese, Korean, Russian, Spanish, Turkish
- Players: 2–4; 2–5 with expansions
- Setup time: 5 minutes
- Playing time: 30 minutes
- Chance: Medium (dice rolling)
- Skills: Strategy, Resource management

Machi Koro (Japanese: 街コロ, Hepburn: machi koro; lit. "Dice Town") is a tabletop city-building game designed by Masao Suganuma, illustrated by Noboru Hotta, and published in 2012 by the Japanese games company Grounding, Inc. Players roll dice to earn coins, with which they develop their city, aiming to win the game by being the first player to complete a number of in-game landmarks. Machi Koro has been published in eleven languages, with the U.S. version being published by IDW Games and Pandasaurus Games.

Machi Koro received multiple awards upon its release, and there have been two major expansions. A standalone game based on the same mechanics, Machi Koro Bright Lights, Big City, was released in 2016, and a legacy variant was released in 2019.

== Gameplay ==
Players assume the role of the mayors of small towns and are tasked with building their towns, attempting to become the first player to complete four major landmarks. On their turn, players roll one or two dice, earning coins when buildings, referred to as establishments, are activated (when the dice roll matches the card's activation number and it is on an appropriate turn for the card color). Each player's turn consists of three phases: dice roll, income (collecting coins from activated cards) and construction, which includes other income-producing establishments and landmark cards.

There are five types of establishment cards, each with their own color and characteristics:

- Landmark (Orange): Each player starts with four unfinished landmarks (six with the Harbor Expansion) that are developed over the course of the game. Each landmark has a permanent ability that becomes available to whoever has completed it. The first player to construct all of their landmarks wins.
- Primary Industry (Blue): These cards represent establishments that produce resources, such as farms, mines and ranches. They earn the player coins every time the card's activation number is rolled.
- Secondary Industry (Green): These cards represent shops, factories, and similar establishments. They earn the player coins whenever that player rolls the card's activation number. (Note: Some of these are not necessarily equivalent to the secondary sector in real life, but rather the tertiary sector, such as the Convenience Store, and do not require Primary Industries of any kind. However, some of these, such as the Cheese Factory, do require certain Primary Industries in the player's town.)
- Restaurant (Red): These cards represent various kinds of eateries and similar establishments. They earn the player coins from any other player who rolls the card's activation number.
- Major Establishment (Purple): These cards represent major businesses and increase the strategic element of the game. They earn the player coins from other players or activate a different effect whenever that player rolls the card's activation number.

== Expansions ==
Two expansions have been released for Machi Koro. The Harbor Expansion (街コロプラス), released in 2012, expanded the base number of landmarks from four to six and added the necessary cards and equipment for a fifth player. Additional industries and establishments related primarily to fishing and shipping were also added. New rules were included to improve gameplay by changing how establishments and industries are made available for use/development. Millionaire's Row (街コロシャープ), was released in English in 2015, added additional luxury-oriented establishments and high-tech industries, as well as a 'renovation' mechanic, used to temporarily close establishments. In 2015, a Deluxe Edition was released in the U.S. combining the base game and both expansions.

In 2016, the standalone Machi Koro Bright Lights, Big City was released, featuring a combination of cards from the base game and both expansions. In 2019, Pandasaurus Games released a legacy variant, Machi Koro Legacy, which changes the game rules and future gameplay with each game completed. In 2020, the successor Machi Koro 2 was released to the Japanese market, and features the same game play, with some new mechanics and cards.

== Reception ==
Machi Koro was nominated for and received a number of awards on release. It won the 2015 Geekie Award for Best Tabletop Game, and was a Spiel des Jahres and As d'Or - Jeu de l'Année nominee that year; it was a Le Lys Grand Public finalist in 2014.
