= Sleeping Queens =

2005 board game

- Designers: Miranda Evarts
- Illustrators: Jimmy Pickering
- Publishers: Gamewright Games
- Publication: 2005; 21 years ago
- Genres: Card games
- Players: 2–5
- Playing time: 20 minutes
- Age range: 8+

Sleeping Queens is a children's card game invented by Miranda Evarts and first manufactured by Gamewright Games in 2005. Players play cards to awaken "sleeping" queen cards and to steal or put to sleep the awakened queens of their opponents.

== Publishing history ==
Sleeping Queens was invented in 2003 by Miranda Evarts at age six based on a dream she had. Her family – Madeline, Denise, and Max Evarts – helped her develop the game and contact the games publishing company Gamewright Games with the idea. Gamewright acquired the intellectual property rights and first published the game in 2005 with illustrations from Jimmy Pickering based on Evarts' drawings.

== Gameplay ==
Sleeping Queens is played with two decks: a blue deck of Queen cards with point values from 5 to 20, and a red deck of action and number cards. The twelve Queen cards are spread out face-down in the play area, and are said to be "sleeping". Five cards from the red deck are dealt to each player and the remaining deck is placed in the centre.

On their turn, a player can either discard cards to draw new ones from the deck or play one action card. Sleeping Queen cards can be "awoken" by playing a King card and are placed face-up in front of the player who awoke them. Some of the queens have special abilities: a player who awakens the Rose Queen can also awaken a second Queen card, and a single player cannot have both the Cat Queen and the Dog Queen awakened in front of them. A Knight card can be played to steal any awakened Queen from a target player, but the action can be blocked by the target if they have a Dragon card. Similarly, a Sleeping Potion card can be used to put any awakened Queen from a target player back asleep and can be countered by playing a Wand card. If a player plays a Jester card, the top card of the deck is revealed: if the card is an action card, then the player puts the card in their hand and takes another turn; if the card is a number card, starting with the person who played the card and counting clockwise, players are counted up to the number on the card with last player getting to awaken a queen. Players can either discard a single card of any type, two identical number cards, or three or more number cards that make an addition equation. Players must always have five cards in their hand and draw back up to this number after playing any cards.

Players take turns until someone has either five Queen cards or Queen cards worth 50 or more points in a 2–3 player game, or has four Queen cards or Queen cards worth 40 points in a 4–5 player game, with that player being the winner.

== Reception ==
Sleeping Queens was chosen by the Canadian Toy Testing Council as one of its "2006 Best Bet Awards" selections and received a 3/3 star rating. It also one of the winners of iParenting Media's 2005 Excellent Products Award. It was nominated for the 2015 As d'Or - Jeu de l'anée award and the 2017 Kinderspiel des Jahres.

Wirecutter listed Sleeping Queens as one of their "32 Best Gifts for 6-Year-Olds," with contributor Caitlin Giddings concluding "Endlessly replayable, Sleeping Queens is subtly educational yet mostly just fun." In a review for Wired, Amy Kraft described Sleeping Queens as "good fun," but noted that younger children may struggle with the game's addition. Tom Vasel, writing for The Dice Tower, praised the game's quality and simple gameplay, but concluded that "There are games that I think are great for adults and children; I think this one will appeal solely to children."
