= Jurassic World: The Legacy of Isla Nublar =

Legacy board game

- Designers: Prospero Hall
- Publication: October 2022
- Genres: Legacy board game
- Languages: English
- Players: 2 to 4
- Age range: 10+

Jurassic World: The Legacy of Isla Nublar is a legacy board game, the first to be developed by Funko's design division, Prospero Hall. It is based on the first five films in the Jurassic Park franchise. After years in development, the game was announced in September 2021. It was launched as a Kickstarter project six months later, and quickly achieved its $100,000 fundraising goal. It was released in October 2022. Early reception was generally positive.

== Gameplay ==
Jurassic World: The Legacy of Isla Nublar is a legacy board game for two to four players, ages 10 and up. The game follows the plots of the first five Jurassic Park films. It is set on Isla Nublar, the fictional island featured in several films. As in the first Jurassic Park film, the players' goal is to build a dinosaur theme park on the island and achieve a lasting legacy. Gameplay takes place across 12 sessions spanning the events of the five films. Players choose from several playable characters, including Dr. Alan Grant, Dr. Ellie Sattler, Dr. Ian Malcolm, John Hammond, Dr. Henry Wu, and Robert Muldoon. The game also introduces several original characters and scenarios not seen in the films.

The game initially features four dinosaurs, and eight additional creatures can be encountered as the game progresses. Dinosaurs are represented as mini figures, while humans take the form of cardboard tabs placed into plastic holders. Gameplay generally revolves around the dinosaurs, such as avoiding carnivores or protecting herbivores. Players can also survey areas, enter buildings to play mini-games, and search for items such as tools and weapons.

New gameplay mechanics are introduced throughout to alter the experience. Players must work together as a team and agree on what action to take, as their choices in one session can have permanent consequences in future sessions. For instance, stickers are placed on the board as the game progresses, representing locations or other elements that become permanent.

== Development and release ==
Jurassic World: The Legacy of Isla Nublar was in development for years. It was created by Funko's design division, Prospero Hall, marking its first legacy game. It is also the first film-based legacy game. Prospero Hall cited the COVID-19 pandemic as its biggest challenge in creating the game. The dinosaur figures are scaled-down replicas based on animations by Industrial Light & Magic, which worked on the CGI dinosaurs in each film. The development team tried to strike a balance with the original films while introducing new characters and story ideas to improve gameplay. In designing the game's look, Prospero Hall referred to old issues of adventure magazines and Scientific American, as well as maps and tourism pamphlets from the 1950s. As a result, the instruction manual and other game documents are designed in a 1950s pulp fiction comic style.

The game was announced in September 2021. It was launched as a Kickstarter project six months later, quickly reaching its $100,000 fundraising goal. The game was released in October 2022, selling for $120. It is Prospero Hall's largest game, with seven pounds' worth of contents.

== Reception ==
Jurassic World: The Legacy of Isla Nublar received positive reception from several reviewers who played it prior to release. Charlie Hall of Polygon played the first three sessions and called the game a "meaty cooperative experience with a confident pace, one that seems to expertly toe the line between the unexpected and the familiar". He considered it "more than just a movie tie-in", writing, "This could be the crossover success that brings the legacy genre of board games into the mainstream". He praised the mini-games, finding them to be "engaging" yet "simple without being dumbed down". William Cennamo of Screen Rant called the game "a fantastic entry into the world of legacy-style games, easy enough for the whole family yet filled with enough strategic decisions for veteran board gamers".

Matthew Aguilar of ComicBook.com gave it a maximum rating of five stars. He praised the colorful board design, vintage game documentation, and level of detail on the dinosaur figures. However, he felt that miniature buildings would have been superior to stickers. Aguilar concluded that the game "lives up to its promise and delivers a one-of-a-kind cooperative experience". Benjamin Abbott of GamesRadar+ also praised the level of detail, but criticized the large number of contents and rules, finding them to be overwhelming. Amy Ratcliffe of Nerdist praised the detail as well, and found the game rules easy to learn.

In a post-release review, Charles Theel of Polygon generally praised the game, in part for capturing the "feeling and emotion" of the original film, elements which he felt were missing in the Jurassic World films. However, he noted the high retail price and found that the mini-games "often feel more like a chore than exciting".

== See also ==
- Jurassic Park (franchise) § Board games
