= Daybreak (board game) =

Board game

- Designers: Matt Leacock; Matteo Menapace
- Publishers: CMYK; Schmidt Spiele (Germany)
- Publication: 2023; 3 years ago
- Players: 1–4
- Playing time: 60–90 min
- Website: daybreakgame.org

Daybreak is a cooperative board game that models the technological and political response to climate change. It is designed by Pandemic creator Matt Leacock and Matteo Menapace, and has been published by CMYK in November 2023.

== Gameplay ==
Throughout the game, the Earth's temperature begins to rise. Simultaneously, players must contend with crisis events, such as droughts, wildfires, rising sea levels, each exacerbated by Earth's rising temperature. Players assume the role of national superpowers or coalitions (the United States, China, Europe, or the Global South), which each have traits to combat the ecological circumstances. For example, the United States has research and development and China has direct economic control. Players divide their investments between carbon emission mitigation and adapting their societies to environmental changes. Based on the game's design, every country needs to contribute or players collectively lose.

In order to win, players must reach drawdown before the end of the sixth round without breaking the 2 degree climate target.

== Development ==
Designer Matt Leacock wanted the game foremost to be fun to play and only secondarily to inform about the effects of climate change without excessive moralizing. The game's title comes from the hopefulness the designers want the game to embody, juxtaposed against the somber circumstances of coping with climate change.

== Public Reception ==
The game has been noted for its optimistic approach to tackling climate change, emphasizing human ingenuity and partnership to overcome environmental challenges. Despite its optimistic tone, some reviewers have pointed out that the game leans more towards fantasy, simplifying the complex realities of global climate issues.

In July 2024 it won the Spiel des Jahres Kennerspiel award for best Connoisseur Game, the first win for Matt Leacock after many nominations.

In February 2025, Daybreak received the Lizzie Magie award at the Rennes en Jeux Festival in France, an award honoring board games with a strong social impact.

== Academic reception ==
The game’s release was reviewed in the international scientific journal, Science, concluding that the game has an “opportunistic attitude to its subject matter, with a focus on cooperative action”. The top-ranked review on BoardGameGeek is by climate scientist, Haley Staudmyer, who also commented on the optimism of Daybreak, but thought it might be over-optimistic. However, Staudmyer acknowledged that hopeful narratives may inspire action.

An academic publication, which assessed a number of climate change board games commercially-available in the UK, concluded that Daybreak provided the potential for a more "radical reimagining of society", as a result of Daybreak's decision not to include money directly as a gameplay component. Scientific components which Daybreak better captured than other games included the role of oceans, the cumulative impact of emissions and its communication of feedback loops and tipping points in the complex climate system. Of the five games reviewed, only Daybreak explicitly incorporated historical inequalities into gameplay. All of the games, including Daybreak, had limited influence of democratic processes on gameplay, and "there was little representation of other animals across the games, with human- rather than eco-centrism playing incentivised". Though Staudmyer considered this to be an positive feature of Daybreak.

The board game has been used as a teaching tool on the London School of Economics' Health Policy programme. The module lead, Professor Miqdad Asariaas explained that the game helps students consider constraints applied by policy rules, as well as the power of changing them. The game has also been used as a teaching aid at the College of the Holy Cross alongside mathematical models of the environment.
