= Rob Daviau =

American game designer

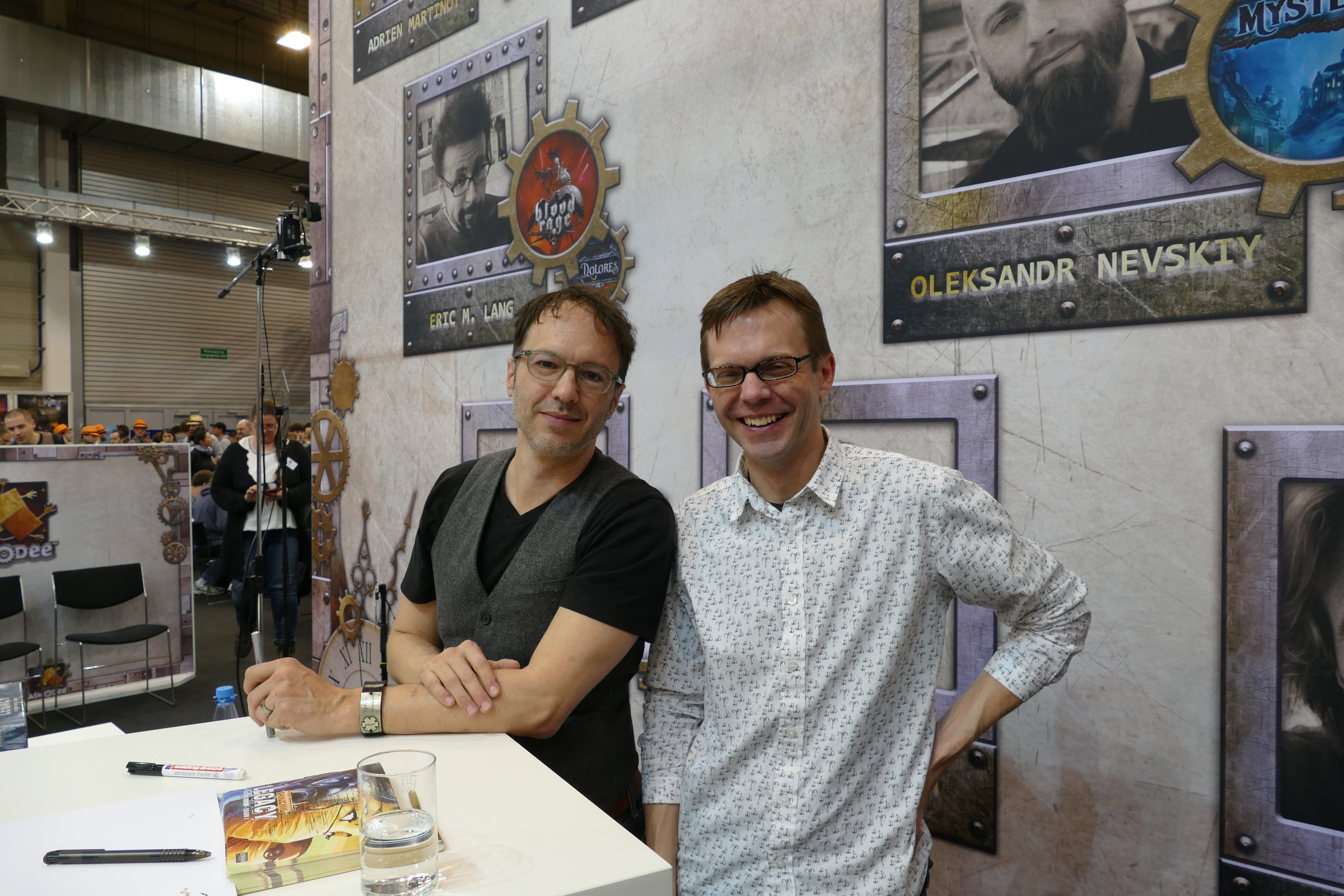
Spiel 16 Essen - Pandemic Legacy - Rob Daviau - Matt Leacock 2

Rob Daviau is an American game designer known for creating legacy board gaming.

== Career ==
He has guest lectured at Massachusetts Institute of Technology, Carnegie Mellon University, and New York University on game design and has been a visiting professor of game design at Hampshire College. In 1998, Daviau joined Hasbro as a writer for text-heavy games like Trivial Pursuit and Taboo.

Daviau is a co-founder of Restoration Games which "specializes in resurrecting older games and giving them new life".

== Bibliography ==
Games that Rob Daviau has designed or co-designed include the following:

- 2000 Star Wars: The Queen's Gambit with Alan Roach and Craig Van Ness (2001 International Gamers Award winner for General Strategy, 2-Player category)
- 2001 Axis & Allies: Pacific with Stephen Baker and Larry Harris Jr. (2001 Origins Awards Best Historical Board Game Winner)
- 2001 Risk 2210 A.D. with Craig Van Ness (2001 Origins Awards Best Science Fiction or Fantasy Board Game Winner)
- 2002 Star Wars Epic Duels with Craig Van Ness
- 2004 Betrayal at House on the Hill with Mike Selinker, Bruce Glassco, Bill McQuillan, and Teeuwynn Woodruff (2004 Origins Awards Gamers' Choice Award Winner; 2005 Japan Boardgame Prize Best Advanced Game Nominee)
- 2004 Heroscape Master Set: Rise of the Valkyrie with Stephen Baker and Craig Van Ness
- 2011 Risk Legacy with Chris Dupuis (2012 Golden Geek Best Innovative Board Game Winner)
- 2015 Pandemic Legacy: Season 1 with Matt Leacock (2015 Golden Geek Board Game of the Year Winner; 2016 SXSW Tabletop Game of the Year Winner; 2016 Dragon Awards Best Science Fiction or Fantasy Board Game Winner)
- 2016 SeaFall
- 2017 Pandemic Legacy: Season 2 with Matt Leacock (2018 Spiel des Jahres Special Prize Winner)
- 2018 Betrayal Legacy with Avalon Hill
- 2019 Unmatched with Noah Cohen, Justin D. Jacobson, Chris Leder, Brian Neff
- 2020 Pandemic Legacy: Season 0 with Matt Leacock
- 2021 Return to Dark Tower with Isaac Childres and Restoration Games.
- 2023 Dragonlance: Warriors of Krynn with Stephen Baker
