= Honor of the Samurai =

Card game

1st edition box, 1996

Honor of the Samurai is a card game published by Gamewright Games in 1996 with a feudal Japanese setting that uses the themes of honor and family.

== Description ==
Honor of the Samurai is a card game for 3–6 players in which the players each take on the role of a Samurai who is working to accumulate personal Honor by helping their general (Daimyo) to become Shogun.

=== Components ===
The game comes with:

- rulebook
- a deck of 110 cards that includes
  - Armies (strength in battles)
  - Ninja (stealing and assassinations)
  - Daimyo
  - Okugata (honorable wives)
  - castles
  - guards
  - special objects (sword smiths, Noh theatre, black powder guns)
  - two special actions: "Dishonor" and "Save Face."
- six six-sided dice with Japanese clan symbols in place of pips
- cardboard Honor chits (for tracking Honor)

=== Setup ===
Each player is given a Samurai card representing their character, and randomly picks a Daimyo to serve. These are placed face up in front of each player. The remaining Daimyos are shuffled into the general deck, and each player is then dealt seven cards. The deck, the Shogun card and the Honor chits are placed in the center of the table.

=== Gameplay ===
Each player's turn has three phases:

1. Collect Honor: The player adds up all the honor points on cards that are face up in front of the player, and takes that value in chits, leaving them beside the player's Daimyo. If the player has lost their Daimyo, the player cannot collect Honor.
2. Calculating Ki and subsequent card actions: The player calculates how many card actions can be taken by adding up "Ki" displayed on all their face up cards and dividing by 3, to a maximum of five card actions. Card actions can include drawing a card, playing a card from their hand to their face-up collection, or discarding a card. Cards are played beside the Daimyo or the Samurai, each representing the two different houses.
3. Making a declaration: The player may make one of four declarations:
  1. Declare their Daimyo to be Shogun (if the post is empty)
  2. Attack another Daimyo (if the attacking player's Daimyo is Shogun or if the attacking player has a face-up castle)
  3. If the player's Daimyo has been killed, the player is Ronin (lord-less) and can declare that they are allied to another Daimyo
  4. The player can also break an alliance.

=== Combat ===
If a player attacks another player's Daimyo, then both players total up their strength total from face-up cards, divide by three and round down, resulting in the number of dice each player will throw. Each player rolls the number of dice indicated and totals the result; the higher value wins. The losing Daimyo is killed (unless the losing player plays the Save Face card. However, if the losing Daimyo was Shogun, this card cannot be used.) All of the losing Daimyo's cards are discarded, although the losing Samurai's house is unaffected. If the losing Daimyo was Shogun, the winning Daimyo becomes Shogun, even if the player does not want this.

The Samurai who has lost their Daimyo is Ronin and cannot accumulate any Honor unless they either play a new Daimyo card from their hand, or ally themselves to another player's Daimyo. In the latter case, both players allied to the same Daimyo can only score half of their Samurai's Honor and half of their shared Daimyo's Honor each turn. The Daimyo with two Samurai can use both of their Strengths in battle. A player wanting to get rid of a second Samurai allied to their Daimyo can give the second Samurai a new Daimyo card from their hand.

=== Other cards ===
- Ninja can be used to steal items from other players or kill Samurai or Daimyos.
- Dishonor can be used to force another player to kill their Samurai or else face a hefty penalty in Honor.

=== Victory conditions ===
The first player to attain 400 Honor points is the winner.

== Publication history ==
Honor of the Samurai was designed by Scott Kimball, with artwork by Alexander Farquharson and Barbara Spelger. It was published in 1996 by Gamewright Games, with foreign language versions published by AMIGO and Corflx. Gamewright published a second edition in 2003.

== Reception ==
Pyramid magazine reviewed Honor of the Samurai and stated that "Gamewright's offerings tend to target the family and children's game market more than the adventure gaming hobby. As a result, some of their previous releases - such as Quests of the Round Table and Eagle Kingdoms - had pretty components but suffered from simplistic game play. Not so with their latest offering, Honor of the Samurai, a card game for 3-6 set in feudal Japan. It both looks nice and plays like a charm."

In the August 1996 edition of Dragon (Issue #232), Rick Swan thought this game "goes down as easily as a cup of hot chocolate." Although he found "the rules are a little stiff, the cards a little bland, and I don't foresee see national Samurai tournaments any time soon," Swan concluded, "That said, Honor of the Samurai remains a pleasant diversion and a great way to spend an afternoon on the patio with Dad."

On the website Game Fanatics, Tomasz Z. Majkowski called this "an excellent, dynamic social game, which is a lot of fun." He did note that "It is difficult to call it a strategic game, because the combination of luck, the ability to quickly make the right decisions, diplomacy and tactics, and not a precisely balanced deck, determine the victory." He concluded with a strong recommendation, saying, "The game can last from a quarter of an hour to several hours, depending on the involvement and cunning of the participants, but even long games are not boring, because the situation changes like a kaleidoscope and the most powerful men fall and then recover again. Let's add an attractive graphic design, faithfulness to historical realities and high flexibility - and we get a product, which is definitely worth your interest."

On the website Spielphase, Claudia Schlee and Andreas Keirat found the game relied too heavily on random chance, saying, "The luck of the cards can be very decisive, because if a player does not have a second daimyo in their hand, the loss of this figure can cause the player to lose too much ground. In this case, allying yourself with a teammate will not win the game. Combats are easy to resolve, but a single throw at the end of the game decides who wins the game. This has always been unsatisfactory for everyone involved." They concluded, "The game starts well, but somehow doesn't work properly and the outcome is almost entirely dependent on luck."

== Reviews ==
- Backstab (Issue 1 - Jan/Feb 1997)
