= Legacy game =

Board game genre

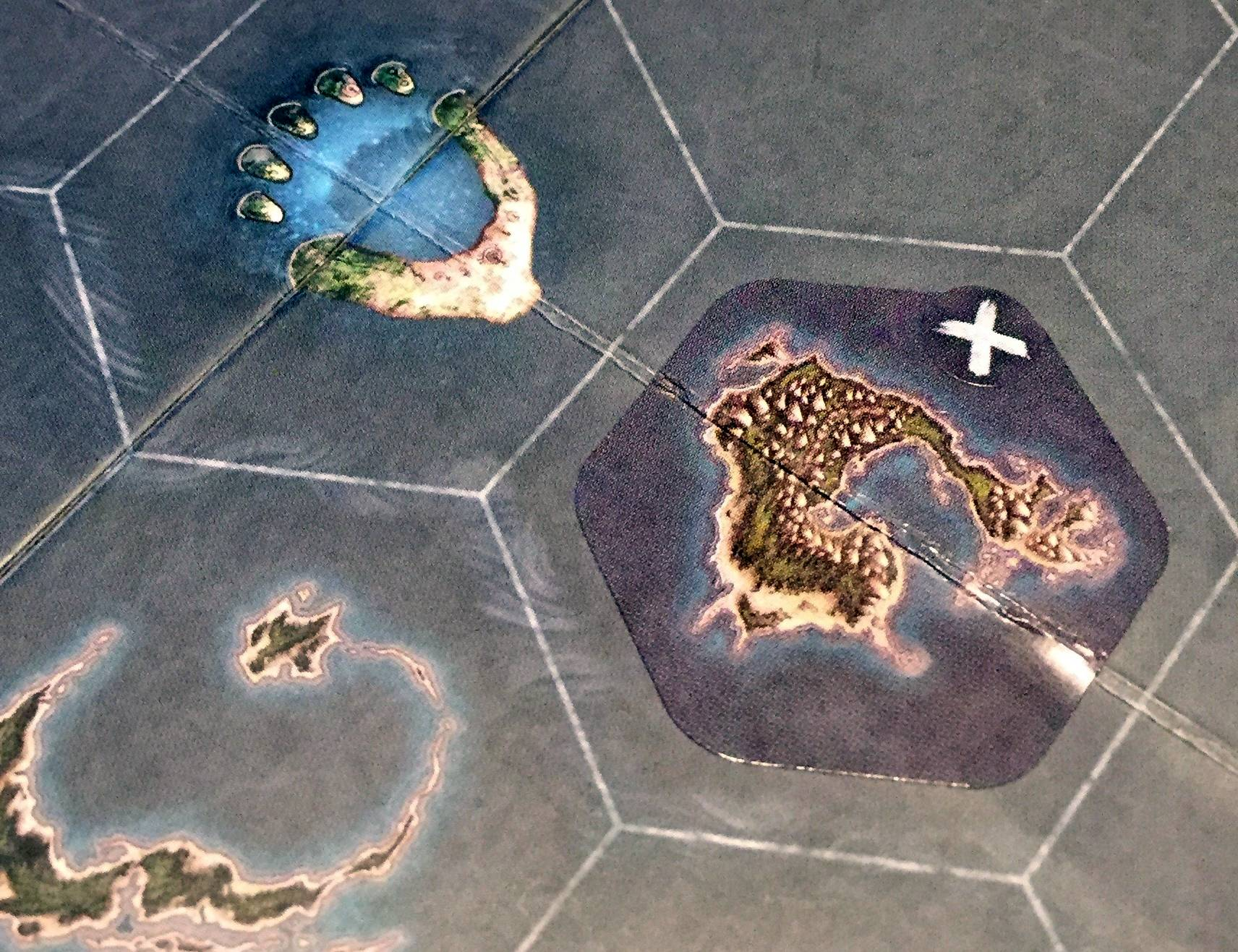
Two stickers - an island hex and a cross marker - added permanently to the board in a game of SeaFall. Such additions are prevalent in legacy-style games.

A legacy game is a variant of tabletop board games in which the game itself is designed, through various mechanics, to change permanently over the course of a series of sessions.

== History ==
Game designer Rob Daviau claims to have come up with the idea at a work meeting after jokingly asking why the murderous characters in Clue are always invited back to dinner. Realizing that each new game resets, Daviau thought about what it would be like if everyone would remember who the murderer was, and he pitched the idea of a Clue legacy game to Hasbro.

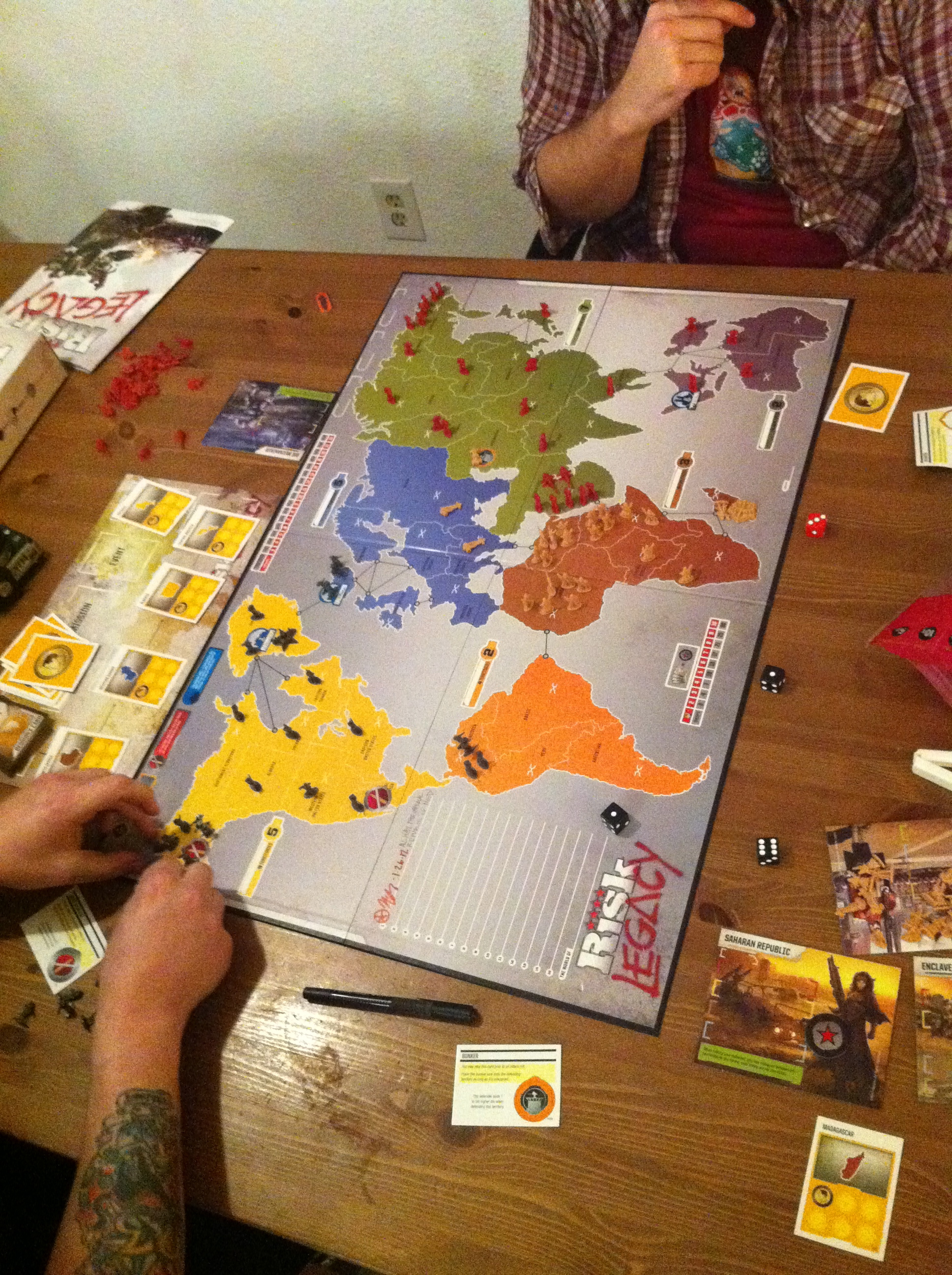
Risk Legacy

While that idea was rejected, Daviau was later asked to use the mechanic in a new version of Risk. Risk Legacy was released in 2011 and was his first game to use this format.

Daviau followed up with an award-winning Pandemic variant, Pandemic Legacy: Season 1, which was released in 2015 to positive reviews and praised as a leap forward in modern board game design. Daviau continues to develop legacy games and co-developed a mechanic, the Echo System, to retain permanent changes through subsequent games in a franchise.

Daviau cited his work on Betrayal at House on the Hill (which was later adapted into a legacy version) and Trivial Pursuit: DVD – Lord of the Rings Trilogy Edition as predecessors to the legacy idea. The latter was designed in such a way that pre-programmed games sorted the cards by difficulty. This caused some vocal backlash as the game was perceived by many to have a more definite end than other versions.

== Common mechanics and themes ==
Legacy games are designed to be played over the course of a campaign, usually with the same players, and permanently change over time. As such they have been compared to tabletop role-playing games like Dungeons & Dragons. New rules can be introduced as the campaign goes on, allowing for the game to expand both mechanically and thematically. Games can use the expanding campaign as a mode of storytelling; Pandemic Legacy: Season 1 uses a three-act structure to tell its story. Daviau describes legacy games as "experiential" in contrast to traditional games, which are "repeatable". He compared his legacy games to that of a concert where you "buy a ticket for an experience" while Haoran Un of Kotaku describes the idea as "avant-garde performance art".

Legacy games break certain covenants that players expect from traditional board games. Permanent, physical changes can occur to components based on game outcomes and player choices. For instance players might be instructed to write names on cards, place stickers on the game board, or destroy some components. This causes each copy of the game to be unique at the end and has earned the legacy genre criticism in that there is a finite amount of replayability. Some games have been designed to be replayable with refill packs or non-permanent stickers while others are still playable with the final permanent changes once the campaign is over.

== List of legacy and legacy-styled games ==
Title	Year published	Notes	Refs
Risk Legacy	2011		
We Didn't Playtest This: Legacies	2012		
Pandemic Legacy: Season 1	2015		
SeaFall	2016		
Gloomhaven	2017		
Android: Netrunner - Terminal Directive	2017	Expansion	
First Martians: Adventures on the Red Planet	2017	Individual campaign	
Pandemic Legacy: Season 2	2017		
Charterstone	2017		
Centauri Saga: Abandoned	2018	Expansion	
The Rise of Queensdale	2018		
Ultimate Werewolf Legacy	2018		
Betrayal Legacy	2018		
Aeon's End: Legacy	2019		
Zombie Kidz Evolution	2019	Children's game	
Machi Koro: Legacy	2019		
Clank! Legacy: Acquisitions Incorporated	2019		
The King's Dilemma	2019		
My City	2020		
Vampire: The Masquerade - Heritage	2020		
Pandemic Legacy: Season 0	2020		
Zombie Teenz Evolution	2020		
Gloomhaven: Jaws of the Lion	2020		
Oath: Chronicles of Empire and Exile	2021		
Frosthaven	2022		
Jurassic World: The Legacy of Isla Nublar	2022		
Wildtails: A Pirate Legacy Game	2022		
Sagrada Artisans	2023		
Capt'n Pepe Treasure Ahoy!	2023	Haba Children's Game	
My Island	2023		
Ticket to Ride Legacy: Legends of the West	2023		
The Queen's Dilemma	2026	Sequel to The King's Dilemma	[47]

== See also ==
- Keepsake game
