= Matt Leacock =

American board game designer

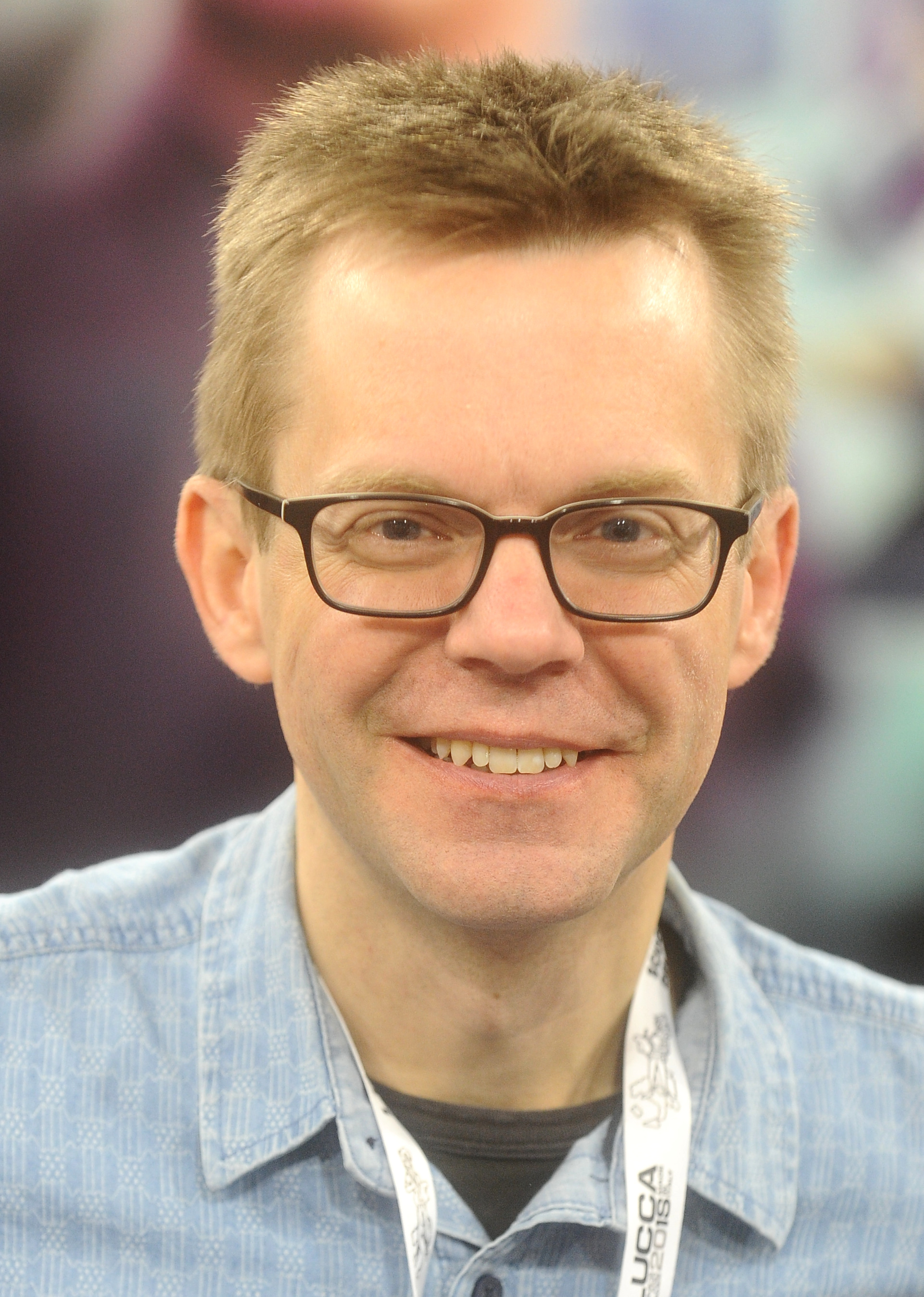
- Matt Leacock at Lucca Comics & Games 2018
- Occupation: Game designer
- Notable work: Pandemic, Forbidden Island and Forbidden Desert
- Website: http://www.leacock.com/

Matt Leacock is an American board game designer, most known for cooperative games such as Pandemic, Pandemic Legacy: Season 1, Forbidden Island and Forbidden Desert.

== Early life ==
Leacock grew up in Long Lake, Minnesota. He studied visual communication at Northern Illinois University.

== Career ==
Matt designed Pandemic, published in 2008 by Z-Man Games. Leacock had previously worked as a developer of social media and as a user experience designer, primarily in community and communications products for AOL and Yahoo. He switched to designing board games full time in July 2014.

Pandemic Legacy: Season 1, which Leacock co-designed with Rob Daviau, has been rated very highly among board gamers and by the website Board Game Geek on its board game rankings. His latest game, Daybreak is about climate change, and won The Best Board or Tabletop Game for Impact at the 2024 Games for Change Festival.

== Games ==
- Pandemic (2008)
- Roll Through the Ages: The Bronze Age (2008)
- Pandemic: On the Brink (Expansion) (2009)
- Forbidden Island (2010)
- Forbidden Desert (2013)
- Pandemic: In The Lab (Expansion) (2013)
- Pandemic: The Cure (2014)
- Pandemic: State of Emergency (Expansion) (2015)
- Pandemic Legacy: Season 1 (2015)
- Thunderbirds (2015)
- Knit Wit (2016)
- Pandemic: Reign of Cthulhu (2016)
- Pandemic Iberia (2016)
- Chariot Race (2016)
- Space Escape (formerly Mole Rats in Space) (2017)
- Pandemic: Rising Tide (2017)
- Pandemic Legacy: Season 2 (2017)
- Pandemic Fall of Rome (2018)
- Forbidden Sky (2018)
- Era: Medieval Age (2019)
- Pandemic Legacy: Season 0 (2020)
- Ticket to Ride: Legends of the West (2023)
- Daybreak (2023)
- Forbidden Jungle (2023)
- Ziggurat (2024)
- Ticket to Ride Legacy: Legends of the West (2024)
- The Lord of the Rings: Fate of the Fellowship (2025)

== Charity ==
According to Leacock, 5% of his design royalty for Pandemic products is donated directly to Medecins Sans Frontieres.
