= Star Wars Epic Duels =

2002 Star Wars board game

Star Wars: Epic Duels
- Box Cover of Star Wars Epic Duels (2002)
- Designers: Craig Van Ness; Rob Daviau
- Publishers: Hasbro; Milton Bradley
- Players: 2–6
- Setup time: 5–15 minutes
- Playing time: 30 minutes
- Chance: Medium (dice rolling, card drawing, luck)
- Age range: 10 and up
- Skills: Teamwork, strategy

The Star Wars Epic Duels board game was released by Hasbro in 2002. It was designed for ages 8 and up, and for 2-6 players. The main designer of the game was Craig Van Ness, with assistance from Rob Daviau. It is out of print.

== Characters ==
There are 12 major characters in the game, and each major character is accompanied by one or two minor characters. The character combinations are: Anakin Skywalker with Padmé Amidala, Darth Maul with two Battle Droids, Obi-Wan Kenobi with two clone troopers, Yoda with two clone troopers, Luke Skywalker with Princess Leia, Mace Windu with two clone troopers, Darth Vader with two Stormtroopers, Count Dooku with two Super Battle Droids, Boba Fett with Greedo, Emperor Palpatine with two Royal Guards, Jango Fett with Zam Wesell, and Han Solo with Chewbacca.

== Game play ==
Game play is based on a card-centered combat system. Each set of characters has its own deck of 31 cards. There are three types of cards in the deck, Basic Combat Cards, Power Combat Cards and Special cards. Basic Combat cards have two values, one for attacking and one for defending. Power Combat cards have combat values and additional effects that give the characters special abilities. There are also "Special" cards that allow the characters to do unique things such as extra movement, drawing/discarding cards, and additional damage. Each player maintains a hand of cards from their respective decks that are used during the game.

Each character card displays how much damage the major and minor characters can take before they are destroyed. Each character uses a wound marker to track the damage on their character card. The object of the game is to destroy all of your opponent's major characters.

During gameplay players alternate turns rolling the die, moving their characters, and then performing 2 "actions". An action is defined in the rulebook as "Drawing a Card, Playing a Card, and Healing a Character." A character is healed by discarding a card of a destroyed major or minor character. There are several different ways to play the game from 1 vs 1, 2 vs 2, 3 vs 3, 3-6 player free-for-all, and even a special "masterplay" variant. Gameplay with 6-12 players is possible, however, it is more easily accomplished if two boards are used adjacent to each other.

== Epic Duels community ==
Despite the fact that the game was out of print by 2004, there is large internet following for the short-lived game. There are numerous fan-sites ("epic_duels_online_league"), forums and groups that still continue to discuss and analyze it. As Hasbro has not announced plans for an expansion to the game, many fans took it upon themselves to create custom decks to be used with the game. A similar Star Wars board game released by Wizards of the Coast called Star Wars Miniatures, has provided many fans with figurines of similar scale to use with the hundreds of custom decks that can be found on the internet. Several Facebook fan groups exist as well. There is also a devoted Yahoo! group to playing Epic Duels online through the VASSAL Engine.

== Reviews ==
- Pyramid
