= Gamewright Games =

Game company founded in 1994

Gamewright Games is a game company that has published over 200 children's games since 1994.

== Description ==
Gamewright Games was founded in 1994 in Newton, Massachusetts by two families seeking better games for their children. The company produces card, dice, board, and party games, and categorizes them by age: 3, 3–6, 6–8, and 8–10+.

One of its best-known games is Sleeping Queens, developed by six-year-old Miranda Evarts in 2006. Sleeping Queens was chosen by the Canadian Toy Testing Council as one of its "2006 Best Bet Awards" selections.

Since 1994, Gamewright has published over 200 titles including Forbidden Island, Forbidden Desert, Honor of the Samurai, Think 'n Sync, and Sushi Go!.

== Awards ==
Gamewright has received several awards for its games, including five Mensa Select Awards:

- 1996 Rat-a-Tat Cat
- 2010 Forbidden Island
- 2014 Qwixx
- 2015 Dragonwood
- 2022 Shifting Stones
