= Betrayal at House on the Hill =

Board game

- Manufacturers: Avalon Hill, Hasbro
- Designers: Bruce Glassco; Rob Daviau; Bill McQuillan; Mike Selinker; Teeuwynn Woodruff
- Illustrators: Justine Mara Andersen; Christopher Moeller; Peter Whitley
- Publishers: Avalon Hill
- Publication: 2004; 22 years ago (1st edition); October 5, 2010; 15 years ago (2nd edition); August 1, 2022; 4 years ago (3rd edition)
- Years active: 2004–present
- Genres: Adventure; Exploration; Horror
- Players: 3 to 6
- Setup time: < 5 minutes
- Playing time: 30 min–2hrs
- Chance: Medium
- Skills: Team play
- Media type: Board game

Betrayal at House on the Hill is a board game published by Avalon Hill in 2004, designed by Bruce Glassco and developed by Rob Daviau, Bill McQuillan, Mike Selinker, and Teeuwynn Woodruff. In the first phase of the game, players all begin as allies exploring a haunted house filled with dangers, traps, items, and omens. As players journey to new parts of the mansion, room tiles are chosen at random and placed on the game board; this means that the game is different each session. In the second phase of the game, the "haunt" begins, with the nature and plot of this session's ghost story revealed; one player usually "betrays" the others and takes the side of the ghosts, monsters, or other enemies, while the remaining players collaborate to defeat them.

== Gameplay ==
Betrayal consists of two phases: the initial Exploration phase and the Haunt phase. At the start of the game, each player selects a character and sets the skill indicators at the characters' starting values. The "house" starts with a ground, upper, and basement floors; the ground and upper floors are immediately connected by a staircase, whereas the basement remains unconnected until certain actions allow a connection. On each turn, the player can move through a number of rooms equivalent to their current Speed. If the player moves through a door where no room has been placed, they add a new room to the house. If that room has an Event, Item, or Omen icon, the player draws the respective card and follows its instructions.

After drawing an Omen card, the player rolls dice and, depending on the result (requirements differ between editions), the Haunt phase will start. The Omen that triggered the Haunt (and, in earlier editions, the room it was found in) determine which Haunt is used and who the "traitor" is; though often the traitor is the one who triggered the Haunt, it may be another player. At this point, the player who is the traitor leaves the room; they read through their specific Haunt goals and rules from one book, while the other players ("heroes") read their victory rules and conditions from a second book and discuss plans to deal with the traitor. Haunts are based on numerous horror tropes, such as zombies, cannibals, dragons, vampires, ghosts, etc. The exact goals for both the heroes and the traitor differ for each possible Haunt; neither side is forced to reveal any new abilities or victory goals, but they must explicitly state what moves they are doing in the game to the other players. After the traitor rejoins the heroes, heroes may attack the traitor or any monsters they might control, and vice versa.

The game features 50 possible haunts.

== Versions ==
Extensive errata, to address unclear or indeterminate rules, are freely available. The first edition is no longer in print, and the second edition was released on October 5, 2010. A Dungeons & Dragons themed version of the game, entitled Betrayal at Baldur's Gate, was announced on June 3, 2017, and released on October 6, 2017.

On November 17, 2017, a "legacy" version of the game, titled Betrayal Legacy, was announced for a Q4 2018 release, featuring a prologue and a thirteen-chapter story taking place over multiple decades. It was released on November 9, 2018.

Avalon Hill released "Betrayal at Mystery Mansion", a Scooby-Doo themed version of the game, on July 24, 2020. This variant includes 25 haunts based on episodes from the show, features faster playtimes than previous versions at 25–50 minutes, and has five playable characters: Scooby-Doo, Fred Jones, Daphne Blake, Velma Dinkley, and Norville "Shaggy" Rogers. Another notable change from previous entries in the Betrayal series is that players may volunteer to be the traitor instead of leaving it up to chance.

On March 1, 2022, Avalon Hill announced a third edition of Betrayal at House on the Hill, releasing April 1, 2022 in Europe before being released to the rest of the world on August 1, 2022. This updated version streamlines gameplay, updates the core haunt mechanics, and adds 5 new scenarios, which give a starting reason for a player's involvement and can modify the Haunt. Third edition also updates the graphical assets and comes with six unpainted miniatures for players to paint. Expansions on this edition are expected to be seen "down the line" according to Chris Nadeau, a senior director and product development lead at Avalon Hill.

== Expansions ==
On April 20, 2016, it was announced that Betrayal at House on the Hill would receive its first expansion, entitled Widow's Walk, on October 14, 2016. The expansion added 20 new room tiles, creating an additional floor (the roof) for gameplay, plus 30 new cards and 50 new haunts. The expansion was designed by Mike Selinker, who was a developer on the original game, as well as Elisa Teague and Liz Spain. Several notable figures contributed to the expansion including animator and writer Pendleton Ward, and Max Temkin of Cards Against Humanity.

== Reception ==
David M. Ewalt comments on the 2010 version: "A horror-themed board game that's different every time you play. Players explore a haunted house until one goes crazy and tries to kill their friends. Randomized, secret scenarios provide surprising story lines and different rules for the killer each game. It's lots of fun, particularly if you're the murderous traitor." Reviewing the second edition, Michael Harrison of Wired.com said he enjoyed the game but found that some of the rules could be exploited to game-breaking effect.

A board game review in Wirecutter stated that the game is "too complex for beginners."

In a review of Betrayal at House on the Hill in Black Gate, Andrew Zimmerman Jones said "What Betrayal at House on the Hill taught me was that the storytelling excitement of roleplaying can be captured within a box, with the added benefit of a lot less planning on the part of a gamemaster."

=== Awards ===
Betrayal at House on the Hill won a 2004 Gamers' Choice Award for Best Board Game.
