= Forbidden Desert =

2013 cooperative board game

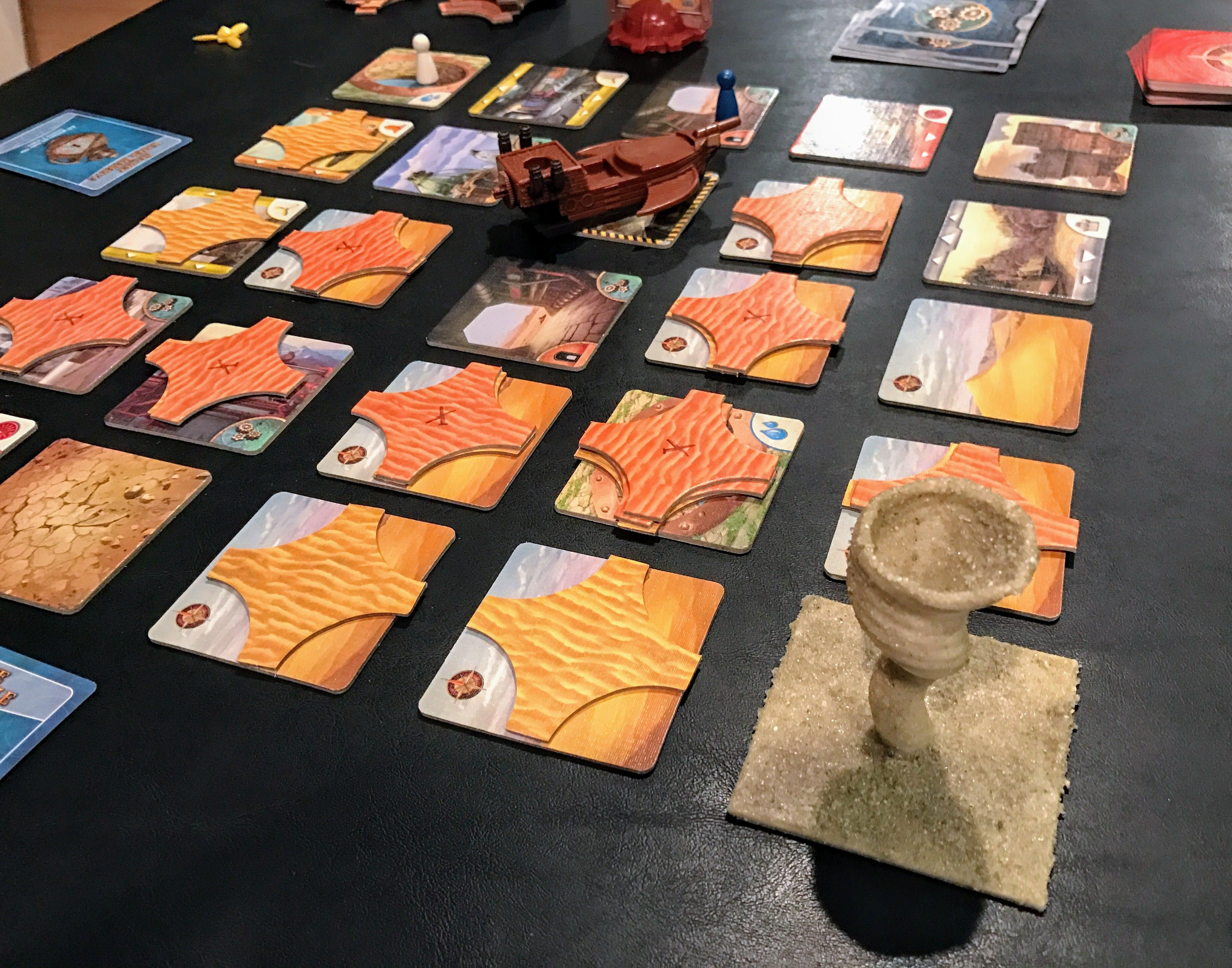
- Designers: Matt Leacock
- Publishers: Gamewright Games
- Publication: 2013; 13 years ago
- Players: 2-5
- Playing time: 45+ minutes
- Age range: 10+

Forbidden Desert is a cooperative board game developed by Matt Leacock and published by Gamewright Games. It is a sequel to the game Forbidden Island. It is also available on mobile.

== Premise ==
Legend tells of an ancient technologically advanced civilization hidden deep within the desert. According to the legend, the civilization was capable of creating a solar-powered airship. Two to five players represent a group of explorers flying over the desert in search of ruins. However, as they're exploring the desert, their helicopter is caught in a desert storm, and they crash into the desert. While the explorers survived, they must now search the desert and find the airship, or they will be stuck in the desert forever.

== Setup ==
Each player receives one role card, which explains what actions they can take, as well as their role's special ability. Each player also receives a water meter marker, which they use to represent the level of water they have in their canteens. The board is created with 24 desert tiles placed in a 5 x 5 formation, with a space in the center of the board, representing the storm. All desert tiles are facing the same direction. 8 sand markers are placed on the board in a diamond formation. All player markers start at the crash site. The level of difficulty (Novice, Normal, Extreme, Legendary) is selected, and the storm meter marker is placed on the corresponding level of the storm meter. The gear deck and storm deck are shuffled, and they, along with the airship, airship pieces, and sand markers, are placed off to the side.

== Gameplay ==
The thirstiest player goes first, and turns move clockwise. The current player can take up to 4 normal actions, or one free action. The same type of action can be done more than once during that turn. Actions include:

- Moving: A player can move to a neighboring desert tile, but not diagonally. Players may only move across desert tiles with fewer than 2 sand markers on them. Tiles with 2 or more sand markers are considered blocked.
- Dig: A player may remove a sand tile from a desert tile that they are on or adjacent to (but not diagonally).
- Collect an airship piece: If a player is on an excavated tile with one or zero sand tiles, the player may pick up the airship piece and place it on the airship.
- Excavate: If a player is on a desert tile without sand, the player may flip over the tile.
- Give Water(Free Action): A player that is on the same tile as another may drop one water level, so the other will gain one water level(players cannot go above their maximum water level).

Some tiles have a special icon on them, and may have special effects when excavated. These icons include:

- Tunnels: Tunnels help protect players from losing water when a Sun Beats Down card is drawn. Additionally. If two or more tunnels have been excavated, and have less than two sand markers on them, the players may move from one tile tunnel to another, regardless of their position on the board.
- Gear: When a desert tile is excavated, and the tile has a gear icon on it, the player who excavated the desert tile will receive a gear card from the gear deck.
- Airship Clue: There are 8 tiles marked with an airship piece, as well as a set of arrows, which represent which row/column an airship piece is located. When both the row and column tiles for an airship piece have been excavated, the corresponding airship piece will be placed at the row/column intersection. If the location for the piece would be in the storm, it will move to the next desert tile that would replace the storm at that location.
- Oasis/Mirage: There are 3 desert tiles which are marked with a water drop. Two of them contain an oasis underneath, and one of them is barren. If a player excavates a tile, and an oasis is underneath, all players on that tile receive 2 water levels(but cannot go past their maximum water level).
- Launch Pad: When all 4 Airship parts have been collected, and all players are on the launchpad, the game is over, and the player wins.

If a player has an equipment card, they may use it at any time, as well as give it to any other player as a free action. Once used, however, the gear card is put back into the game box. Gear Cards include:

- Dune Blaster: Clears all sand from a desert tile that the player is on or adjacent to.
- Jet Pack: Moves the player and up to one person on the same desert tile to any unblocked tile.
- Secret Water Reserve: Gives the player and everyone on the same tile 2 water levels(but cannot go past their maximum water level).
- Solar Shield: Protects all players on the same tile when a Sun Beats Down card is drawn..
- Terrascope: The player may select one unexcavated tile and peek under it. Any effects that would result if it was excavated does not happen.
- Time Throttle: The player gets 2 extra actions this turn.

After the current player has completed their turn, the player looks at the Storm Meter, and draws cards from the Storm Deck equal to the Storm Level. If the Storm Deck runs out of cards, the Storm Discard Pile is shuffled and used as the new Storm Deck. There are three types of cards:

- Sun Beats Down: All players lose one water level. If their water level would go below zero, that player dies of thirst. Players who are in a tunnel or under a Solar Shield are safe this turn.
- Storm Picks Up: The Storm Meter Level goes up 1 tick mark. If the number of cards drawn would increase, that amount would be drawn the next turn.
- Storm Movement Card: Players move the "Storm", or empty space, by moving desert tiles into the direction of where the Storm would be. For example: If the card shows 2 squares and a right arrow, the 2 desert tiles to the right of the storm move left. Each tile by a Storm card gets a sand marker. If a tile has at least one sand marker, then place the sand marker with the "X" side up(this means that the tile is blocked). If a tile becomes blocked while a player is on it, the player is buried in the sand until the tile has at most one sand marker, and as long as they are buried, can only use Dig as their normal actions. If a Storm Card can only be partially completed, the tiles that were moved from that card were buffeted by the storm, and each gain an additional sand marker. If a Storm card would move the Storm in a certain direction, and the Storm cannot move in that direction at all, nothing happens. The card still counts as drawn for the Storm's turn.

The turn then goes to the next player. Gameplay continues until one of the following happens:

- The Storm Meter reaches the Skull and Crossbones (Loss)
- A player has died of thirst (Loss)
- A sand marker must be placed on a tile, and there are none available (Loss)
- The 4 Airship pieces (Compass, Engine, Propeller, Solar Crystal) have been collected, the Launch Pad has been excavated, and all players are on the Launch Pad tile (Win)

== Player roles ==
Forbidden Desert is for two-to-five players. Like Forbidden Island, there are 6 different roles. Each role corresponds to a different color, and each role has a different ability. Some of these roles are similar to the roles in Forbidden Island. Some roles carry more or less water than the others, depending on their role.

- Archaeologist (Water: 3) The Archaeologist can clear 2 sand markers from 1 tile per action. This does not mean that clearing 1 sand marker counts as a half action.
- Climber (Water: 3) The climber can move across blocked tiles, and may take up to 1 player when they move. The Climber, as well as players on the same tile as the Climber, cannot be buried.
- Explorer (Water: 4) The explorer, unlike other players, can move, clear sand, and use Dune Blasters diagonally.
- Meteorologist (Water: 4) The Meteorologist can spend 1 action to look at the top Storm cards equal to the Storm level, and if they do, may put 1 of the Storm cards at the bottom of the deck. Additionally, the Meteorologist may spend actions to draw fewer Storm cards at the end of their turn.
- Navigator (Water: 4) The Navigator may move another player up to 3 unblocked tiles per action. This includes moving players through tunnels. If the Navigator is moving the Climber or Explorer, they may use their respective abilities while moving them.
- Water Carrier (Water: 5) While other players can only take water from oases when they are excavated, the Water Carrier is capable of taking 2 water level from oases after they have been excavated(but are unblocked) for 1 action. Additionally, the Water Carrier can give water to other players on adjacent tiles at any time.
