= List of best-selling Nintendo Switch video games =

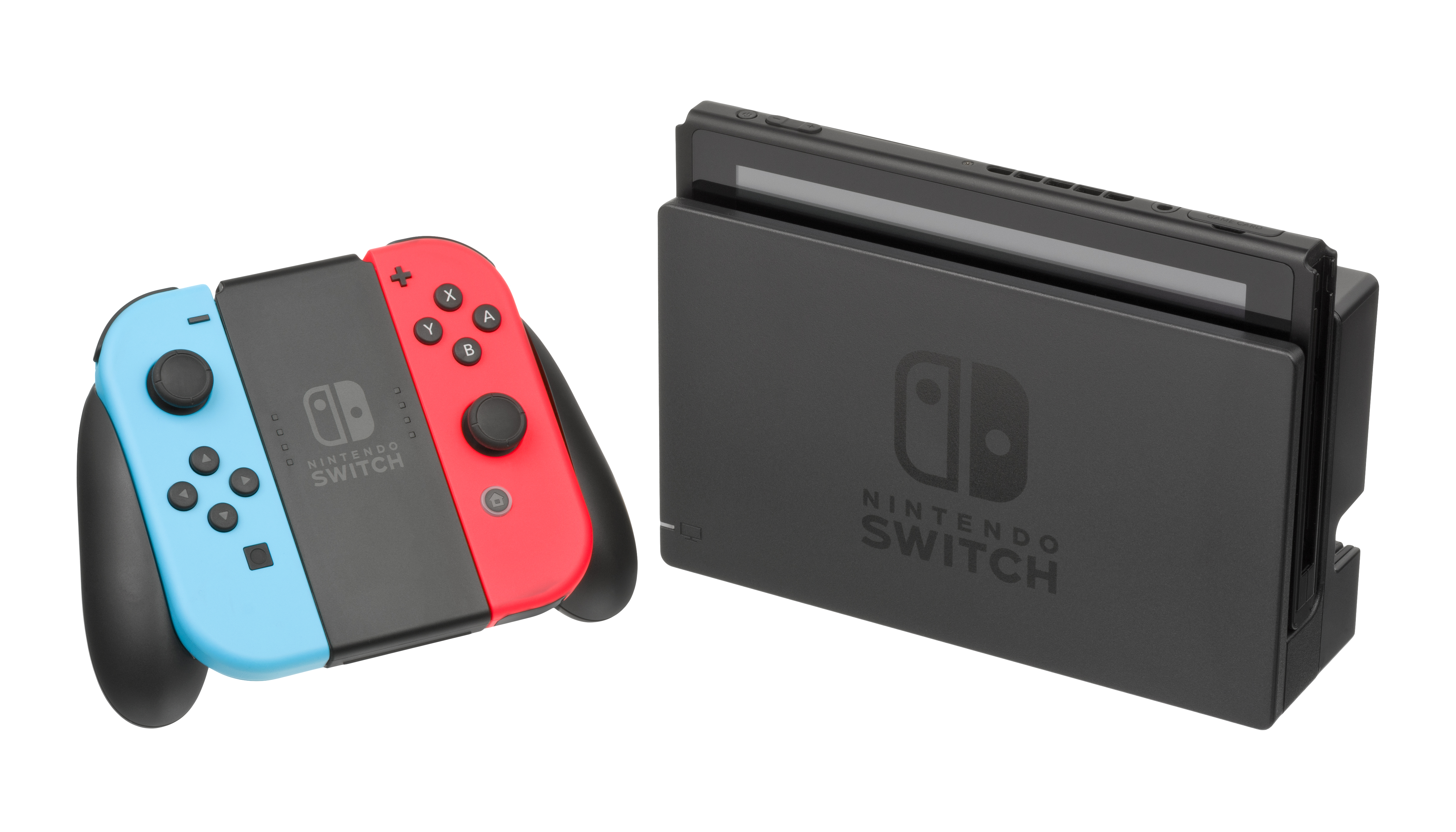
A Nintendo Switch console with Joy-Con

This is a list of the best selling video games for the Nintendo Switch that have sold or shipped at least one million copies. As Nintendo shares the sales of their video games every quarter while most other publishers do not share sales figures per console, this list consists mostly of Nintendo-published titles.

Nintendo Switch, a hybrid home console and handheld device, launched worldwide on March 3, 2017. By the end of 2017, it had outsold the lifetime sales of Wii U, its home console predecessor. In September 2019, Nintendo launched the Nintendo Switch Lite, a handheld-only version of the system. By the end of 2020, total Nintendo Switch family units had outsold the lifetime sales of the Nintendo 3DS, its handheld console predecessor, by selling nearly 80 million units. As of September 30, 2026, 157.20 million Nintendo Switch consoles had been shipped, with close to 1.6 billion copies of games having been shipped for the platform. The three best-selling games on the platform have been Mario Kart 8 Deluxe at 72.00 million units sold, Animal Crossing: New Horizons at 50.63 million units, and Super Smash Bros. Ultimate at 38.50 million units. The three best-selling franchises on the platform have been Mario at 279.72 million units sold, Pokémon at 120.10 million units, and The Legend of Zelda at 75.88 million units. Other major selling franchises include Splatoon, which sold 25.56 million units, and Kirby, which sold 13.36 million units.

== List ==
List of best-selling Nintendo Switch video games
Title	Copies sold	As of	Release date (Note: Only the initial release date on this platform is listed.)	Genre(s)	Developer(s)	Publisher(s)
Mario Kart 8 Deluxe	72.00 million	September 30, 2026	April 28, 2017	Kart racing	Nintendo EPD	Nintendo
Animal Crossing: New Horizons	50.63 million	September 30, 2026	March 20, 2020	Social simulation	Nintendo EPD	Nintendo
Super Smash Bros. Ultimate	38.50 million	September 30, 2026	December 7, 2018	Fighting	Bandai Namco Studios; Sora Ltd.	Nintendo
The Legend of Zelda: Breath of the Wild	34.28 million	September 30, 2026	March 3, 2017	Action-adventure	Nintendo EPD	Nintendo
Super Mario Odyssey	31.06 million	September 30, 2026	October 27, 2017	Platformer	Nintendo EPD	Nintendo
Pokémon Scarlet and Violet	28.66 million	September 30, 2026	November 18, 2022	Role-playing	Game Freak	The Pokémon Company; Nintendo
Pokémon Sword and Shield	27.36 million	September 30, 2026	November 15, 2019	Role-playing	Game Freak	The Pokémon Company; Nintendo
The Legend of Zelda: Tears of the Kingdom	22.90 million	September 30, 2026	May 12, 2023	Action-adventure	Nintendo EPD	Nintendo
Super Mario Party	21.39 million	September 30, 2026	October 5, 2018	Party	NDcube	Nintendo
New Super Mario Bros. U Deluxe	19.22 million	September 30, 2026	January 11, 2019	Platformer	Nintendo EPD	Nintendo
Nintendo Switch Sports	18.32 million	March 31, 2026	April 29, 2022	Sports	Nintendo EPD	Nintendo
Super Mario Bros. Wonder	17.44 million	March 31, 2026	October 20, 2023	Platformer	Nintendo EPD	Nintendo
Ring Fit Adventure	15.38 million	March 31, 2023	October 18, 2019	Exergame; role-playing	Nintendo EPD	Nintendo
Pokémon: Let's Go, Pikachu! and Let's Go, Eevee!	15.07 million	December 31, 2022	November 16, 2018	Role-playing	Game Freak	The Pokémon Company; Nintendo
Pokémon Brilliant Diamond and Shining Pearl	15.06 million	December 31, 2022	November 19, 2021	Role-playing	ILCA	The Pokémon Company; Nintendo
Pokémon Legends: Arceus	14.83 million	March 31, 2023	January 28, 2022	Action role-playing	Game Freak	The Pokémon Company; Nintendo
Luigi's Mansion 3	14.25 million	March 31, 2024	October 31, 2019	Action-adventure	Next Level Games	Nintendo
Mario Party Superstars	14.00 million	March 31, 2025	October 29, 2021	Party	NDcube	Nintendo
Splatoon 2	13.60 million	December 31, 2022	July 21, 2017	Third-person shooter	Nintendo EPD	Nintendo
Super Mario 3D World + Bowser's Fury	13.47 million	March 31, 2024	February 12, 2021	Platformer	Nintendo EPD	Nintendo
Splatoon 3	11.96 million	March 31, 2024	September 9, 2022	Third-person shooter	Nintendo EPD	Nintendo
Super Mario Party Jamboree	10.73 million	September 30, 2026	October 17, 2024	Party	Nintendo EPD	Nintendo
Pokémon Legends: Z-A	9.27 million	September 30, 2026	October 16, 2025	Action role-playing	Game Freak	The Pokémon Company; Nintendo
Super Mario 3D All-Stars	9.07 million	December 31, 2021	September 18, 2020	Platformer; compilation	Nintendo EPD	Nintendo
Tomodachi Life: Living the Dream	8.83 million	September 30, 2026	April 16, 2026	Social Simulation	Nintendo EPD	Nintendo
Super Mario Maker 2	8.42 million	December 31, 2022	June 28, 2019	Platformer; Level editor	Nintendo EPD	Nintendo
Monster Hunter Rise	8.09 million (Note: Monster Hunter Rise sales breakdown: Worldwide until December 31, 2021 – 7.70 million; Japan physical Monster Hunter Rise + Sunbreak Set – 0.326 million; Japan physical Monster Hunter Rise + Sunbreak Set Best Price – 0.068 million)	February 27, 2025	March 26, 2021	Action role-playing	Capcom	Capcom
Stardew Valley	7.90 million	December 29, 2024	October 5, 2017	Farm life sim; role-playing	ConcernedApe	ConcernedApe (Note: Published by Chucklefish between 2016–2018)
Kirby and the Forgotten Land	7.52 million	March 31, 2024	March 25, 2022	Platformer	HAL Laboratory	Nintendo
Suika Game	7.40 million	April 11, 2024	December 9, 2021	Puzzle	Aladdin X	Aladdin X
Minecraft	6.77 million (Note: Minecraft physical sales breakdown: France – 1.92 million; Japan – 4.20 million; Spain – 0.65 million)	May 17, 2026	May 11, 2017	Sandbox; survival	Mojang	JP: Xbox Game Studios; NA/PAL: Mojang
The Legend of Zelda: Link's Awakening	6.46 million	December 31, 2022	September 20, 2019	Action-adventure	Grezzo	Nintendo
Clubhouse Games: 51 Worldwide Classics	4.64 million	December 31, 2022	June 5, 2020	Tabletop game	NDcube	Nintendo
Donkey Kong Country: Tropical Freeze	4.62 million	December 31, 2022	May 4, 2018	Platformer	Retro Studios	Nintendo
Mario Tennis Aces	4.50 million	December 31, 2022	June 22, 2018	Sports	Camelot Software Planning	Nintendo
Kirby Star Allies	4.38 million	December 31, 2022	March 16, 2018	Platformer	HAL Laboratory	Nintendo
The Legend of Zelda: Skyward Sword HD	4.15 million	December 31, 2022	July 16, 2021	Action-adventure	Tantalus Media	Nintendo
Fire Emblem: Three Houses	4.12 million	December 31, 2022	July 26, 2019	Tactical role-playing	Intelligent Systems; Koei Tecmo	Nintendo
The Legend of Zelda: Echoes of Wisdom	4.09 million	March 31, 2025	September 26, 2024	Action-adventure	Nintendo EPD; Grezzo	Nintendo
Hyrule Warriors: Age of Calamity	4 million	January 4, 2022	November 20, 2020	Hack and slash	Omega Force	JP: Koei Tecmo; NA/PAL: Nintendo
Momotaro Dentetsu: Showa, Heisei, Reiwa Mo Teiban!	4 million	July 19, 2023	November 19, 2020	Board game	Konami	JP: Konami
Pokémon FireRed and LeafGreen	4 million	April 10, 2026	February 27, 2026	Role-playing	Game Freak	JP: The Pokémon Company; NA/PAL: Nintendo
1-2-Switch	3.74 million	December 31, 2022	March 3, 2017	Party	Nintendo EPD	Nintendo
Pikmin 4	3.48 million	March 31, 2024	July 21, 2023	Real-time strategy	Nintendo EPD	Nintendo
Paper Mario: The Origami King	3.47 million	December 31, 2022	July 17, 2020	Role-playing; action-adventure	Intelligent Systems	Nintendo
Yoshi's Crafted World	3.35 million	December 31, 2022	March 29, 2019	Platformer	Good-Feel	Nintendo
Super Mario RPG	3.31 million	March 31, 2024	November 17, 2023	Role-playing	ArtePiazza	Nintendo
Among Us	3.20 million	December 31, 2020	December 15, 2020	Party; social deduction	Innersloth	Innersloth
Metroid Dread	3.07 million	December 31, 2022	October 8, 2021	Action-adventure	MercurySteam; Nintendo EPD	Nintendo
Mario + Rabbids Sparks of Hope	3 million	January 15, 2024	October 20, 2022	Tactical role-playing	Ubisoft Paris; Ubisoft Milan	NA/PAL: Ubisoft; JP: Nintendo
Rhythm Heaven Groove	2.89 million	September 30, 2026	July 2, 2026	Rhythm, Music	Nintendo EPD	Nintendo
Super Mario Galaxy 2	2.76 million	March 31, 2026	October 2, 2025	Platformer	Nintendo Software Technologies	Nintendo
New Pokémon Snap	2.74 million (Note: New Pokémon Snap sales breakdown: Worldwide – 2.40 million; Japan – 0.34 million (physical))	May 15, 2022	April 30, 2021	Photography	Bandai Namco Studios	JP: The Pokémon Company; NA/PAL: Nintendo
Arms	2.72 million	December 31, 2022	June 16, 2017	Fighting	Nintendo EPD	Nintendo
Xenoblade Chronicles 2	2.70 million	December 31, 2022	December 1, 2017	Action role-playing	Monolith Soft	Nintendo
Super Mario Galaxy	2.60 million	March 31, 2026	October 2, 2025	Platformer	Nintendo Software Technologies	Nintendo
Mario Strikers: Battle League	2.54 million	March 31, 2023	June 10, 2022	Sports	Next Level Games	Nintendo
Mario Golf: Super Rush	2.48 million	December 31, 2022	June 25, 2021	Sports	Camelot Software Planning	Nintendo
Dragon Ball FighterZ	2.43 million	December 31, 2022	September 27, 2018	Fighting	Arc System Works	Bandai Namco Entertainment
Pikmin 3 Deluxe	2.40 million	December 31, 2022	October 30, 2020	Real-time strategy	Eighting	Nintendo
Captain Toad: Treasure Tracker	2.35 million	December 31, 2022	July 13, 2018	Puzzle-platform	Nintendo EPD	Nintendo
Taiko no Tatsujin: Drum 'n' Fun!	2.24 million	December 31, 2022	July 19, 2018	Rhythm	Bandai Namco Studios	Bandai Namco Entertainment
Octopath Traveler	2.16 million (Note: Octopath Traveler sales breakdown: Worldwide – 1.9 million; Japan – 0.26 million (physical))	January 2, 2022	July 13, 2018	Role-playing	Square Enix; Acquire	JP: Square Enix; NA/PAL: Nintendo
Paper Mario: The Thousand-Year Door	2.10 million	March 31, 2025	May 23, 2024	Role-playing	Intelligent Systems	Nintendo
Human: Fall Flat	2 million (Note: Japan only)	May 2, 2024	December 7, 2017	Puzzle-platform	No Brakes Games	JP: Teyon Japan; NA/PAL: Curve Digital
Mario + Rabbids Kingdom Battle	2 million	September 2, 2018	August 29, 2017	Tactical role-playing	Ubisoft Paris; Ubisoft Milan	NA/PAL: Ubisoft; JP/KOR: Nintendo
Pokémon Mystery Dungeon: Rescue Team DX	1.99 million	December 31, 2022	March 6, 2020	Roguelike	Spike Chunsoft	Nintendo
Mario & Luigi: Brothership	1.97 million	March 31, 2025	November 7, 2024	Role-playing	Acquire	Nintendo
Big Brain Academy: Brain vs. Brain	1.94 million	December 31, 2022	December 3, 2021	Puzzle	Nintendo EPD, indieszero	Nintendo
Luigi's Mansion 2 HD	1.88 million	March 31, 2025	June 27, 2024	Action-Adventure	Tantalus Media	Nintendo
Xenoblade Chronicles: Definitive Edition	1.88 million	December 31, 2022	May 29, 2020	Action role-playing	Monolith Soft	Nintendo
Xenoblade Chronicles 3	1.86 million	March 31, 2023	July 29, 2022	Action role-playing	Monolith Soft	Nintendo
Dragon Ball Xenoverse 2	1.82 million	December 31, 2022	September 7, 2017	Fighting	Dimps	Bandai Namco Entertainment
Miitopia	1.79 million	December 31, 2022	May 21, 2021	Role-playing	Grezzo	Nintendo
Mario Kart Live: Home Circuit	1.73 million	December 31, 2022	October 16, 2020	Kart racing; augmented reality	Velan Studios	Nintendo
Naruto Shippudden: Ultimate Ninja Storm Trilogy	1.73 million	December 31, 2022	July 27, 2017	Fighting	CyberConnect2	Bandai Namco Entertainment
Resident Evil: Revelations Collection	1.70 million	June 30, 2026	November 27, 2017	Survival horror	Capcom	Capcom
Fire Emblem Engage	1.61 million	March 31, 2023	January 20, 2023	Tactical role-playing	Intelligent Systems	Nintendo
Marvel Ultimate Alliance 3: The Black Order	1.60 million	December 31, 2022	July 19, 2019	Action role-playing	Team Ninja	Nintendo
Pokkén Tournament DX	1.54 million (Note: Pokkén Tournament DX sales breakdown: Worldwide – 1.16 million; Japan – 0.38 million (physical))	January 2, 2022	September 22, 2017	Fighting	Bandai Namco Studios	JP: The Pokémon Company; NA/PAL: Nintendo
Momotaro Dentetsu World: Chikyuu wa Kibou de Mawatteru!	1.50 million	December 25, 2024	November 16, 2023	Board game	Konami	JP: Konami
Kirby's Return to Dream Land Deluxe	1.46 million	March 31, 2023	February 24, 2023	Platformer	HAL Laboratory	Nintendo
Nintendo Labo Toy-Con 01: Variety Kit	1.42 million	December 31, 2020	April 20, 2018	Construction kit	Nintendo EPD	Nintendo
Dragon's Dogma: Dark Arisen	1.40 million	September 30, 2026	April 23, 2019	Role-playing	Capcom	Capcom
Resident Evil 6	1.40 million	September 30, 2026	October 29, 2019	Survival horror	Capcom	Capcom
WarioWare: Get It Together!	1.34 million	December 31, 2022	September 10, 2021	Party	Intelligent Systems	Nintendo
Astral Chain	1.33 million	December 31, 2022	August 30, 2019	Action-adventure; hack and slash	PlatinumGames	Nintendo
Princess Peach: Showtime!	1.30 million	June 30, 2024	March 22, 2024	Action-adventure	Good-Feel	Nintendo
Resident Evil 4	1.30 million	September 30, 2026	May 21, 2019	Survival horror	Capcom	Capcom
Donkey Kong Country Returns HD	1.27 million	March 31, 2025	January 16, 2025	Platformer	Forever Entertainment	Nintendo
Dr Kawashima's Brain Training for Nintendo Switch	1.27 million	December 31, 2022	December 27, 2019	Puzzle	Nintendo EPD, indieszero	Nintendo
Bayonetta	1.24 million	December 31, 2022	February 16, 2018	Action-adventure; hack and slash	PlatinumGames	Nintendo
Bayonetta 2	1.23 million	December 31, 2022	February 16, 2018	Action-adventure; hack and slash	PlatinumGames	Nintendo
Dark Souls Remastered	1.15 million	December 31, 2022	October 19, 2018	Action role-playing game	FromSoftware	Bandai Namco Entertainment
Game Builder Garage	1.15 million	December 31, 2022	June 11, 2021	Programming	Nintendo EPD	Nintendo
Mario vs. Donkey Kong	1.12 million	March 31, 2024	February 16, 2024	Puzzle-platform	Nintendo Software Technology	Nintendo
Shin Megami Tensei V	1.10 million	December 31, 2022	November 11, 2021	Role-playing	Atlus	JP: Atlus; NA: Sega; PAL: Nintendo
Metroid Prime Remastered	1.09 million	March 31, 2023	February 8, 2023	Action-adventure	Retro Studios	Nintendo
Bayonetta 3	1.07 million	March 31, 2023	October 28, 2022	Action-adventure; hack and slash	PlatinumGames	Nintendo
Mario & Sonic at the Olympic Games Tokyo 2020	1.02 million (Note: Mario & Sonic sales breakdown: Worldwide as of March 31, 2020 – 0.9 million; Japan physical afterwards from April 5, 2020 up until March 3, 2022 – 0.126 million)	March 3, 2022	November 1, 2019	Sports	Sega	Sega
Dragon Quest III HD-2D Remake	1 million (Note: Japan only retail)	March 16, 2025	November 14, 2024	Role-playing	Square Enix; Artdink	Square Enix
Dragon Quest Monsters: The Dark Prince	1 million	January 17, 2024	December 1, 2023	Role-playing	Tose	Square Enix
Enter the Gungeon	1 million	March 3, 2019	December 14, 2017	Bullet hell	Dodge Roll	Devolver Digital
Fire Emblem Warriors: Three Hopes	1 million	August 17, 2022	June 24, 2022	Hack and slash; Role-playing	Omega Force	JP: Koei Tecmo; NA/PAL: Nintendo
Fitness Boxing	1 million	September 8, 2020	December 20, 2018	Exergame; rhythm	Imagineer	JP: Imagineer; NA/PAL: Nintendo
Fitness Boxing 2: Rhythm and Exercise	1 million	December 9, 2021	December 4, 2020	Exergame; rhythm	Imagineer	JP: Imagineer; NA/PAL: Nintendo
Story of Seasons: Pioneers of Olive Town	1 million	November 18, 2021	February 25, 2021	Simulation; role-playing	Marvelous	Xseed Games
Thief Simulator	1 million	July 16, 2021	May 19, 2019	Stealth	Noble Muffins	Forever Entertainment

== See also ==
- List of best-selling Nintendo video games
