= List of traditional Japanese games =

This is a list of traditional Japanese games.

== Games ==
=== Children's games ===
- Beigoma
- Bīdama
- Daruma-san
- Kakurenbo
- Kemari
- Kendama
- Ken-ken-pa (Hopscotch)
- Menko
- Nawatobi (Jump rope)
- Ohajiki
- Onigokko
- Oshikura Manju
- Otedama

=== Board games ===
- Go - originates in China, important rules change (free opening) in Japan
- Renju
- Shogi
- Hasami shogi
- Sugoroku
- Ninuki-renju

=== Card games ===
- Buta no shippo
- Daifugō (another name: Daihinmin)
- Hanafuda
- Karuta
- Oicho-Kabu
- Two-ten-jack (Tsū-ten-jakku) - a Japanese trick-taking card game.
- Uta-garuta - a kind of karuta (another name: Hyakunin Isshu)

=== Tile games ===
- Japanese Mahjong - Japanese mahjong, also called rīchi mahjong
- Goita

=== Dice games ===
- Choboichi
- Cho-han bakuchi - a gambling game
- Kitsune bakuchi

=== Word games ===
- Dajare
- Henohenomoheji
- Kaibun
- Shiritori
- Uta-garuta

=== Solitaire games ===
- Sudoku
- Tsume shogi

=== Drinking games ===
- Konpira see https://www.samuraitours.com/japanese-partydrinking-game/

== See also ==
- Japanese role-playing game
- Video game
