= Mario Party: Star Rush =

2016 video game

- Developer: NDcube
- Publisher: Nintendo
- Director: Shuichiro Nishiya
- Producers: Keisuke Terasaki; Toyokazu Nonaka; Toshiaki Suzuki; Atsushi Ikeda; Kenji Kikuchi
- Designer: Takeru Sugimoto
- Programmer: Masayuki Shinohara
- Artist: Keisuke Kasahara
- Composers: Toshiki Aida; Satoshi Okubo
- Series: Mario Party
- Platform: Nintendo 3DS
- Release: EU: October 7, 2016; AU: October 8, 2016; JP: October 20, 2016; NA: November 4, 2016
- Genre: Party
- Modes: Single-player, multiplayer

Mario Party: Star Rush (Note: Japanese: マリオパーティ スターラッシュ, Hepburn: Mario Pātī Sutā Rasshu) is a 2016 party video game developed by NDcube and published by Nintendo for the Nintendo 3DS. It is the fourth handheld game in the Mario Party series, as well as the second installment in the series to be released for the 3DS. The game was released in Europe, Australia, and Japan in October 2016 and in North America in November 2016.

Mario Party: Star Rush deviates from the traditional turn-based gameplay present throughout the Mario Party series, as well as the car-based gameplay introduced in Mario Party 9 (2012), with players now rolling dice and moving simultaneously on non-linear, grid-like game boards. However, much like other Mario Party titles, the game revolves around playing several multiplayer game modes, including a main mode in which up to four playable characters – each controlled by either a human player or artificial intelligence – compete in a board game featuring various minigames, sharing the objective of obtaining the most Stars.

The game has sold more than 88,000 copies and received mixed reviews, with some critics praising the new direction for the series and the removal of the controversial car-oriented gameplay featured in both Mario Party 9 and Mario Party 10 (2015). Conversely, criticism was largely directed toward the repetitive game modes, as well as the lack of game boards and minigames. Mario Party: Star Rush was followed by Mario Party: The Top 100, a 2017 minigame compilation for the 3DS.

== Gameplay ==
Following the format of previous Mario Party titles, Mario Party: Star Rush is a party video game in which up to four characters from the Mario franchise compete in a virtual board game. The playable characters are each controlled by either a human player or artificial intelligence (AI), with the latter having several difficulty levels, including Normal, Hard, and Very Hard.

Yoshi, Princess Peach, Toadette, Donkey Kong, and four Toads battling King Bob-omb, one of the game's bosses

There are 12 playable characters: Mario, Luigi, Princess Peach, Princess Daisy, Rosalina, Yoshi, Toad, Toadette, Donkey Kong, Wario, Waluigi, and Diddy Kong. During board games, players roll dice and move around game boards interspersed with minigames. Most minigames are skill-based, though a couple are dependent on luck, such as Haunted Hallways, in which players race to reach a hidden goal on a map filled with Boos and doors. Mario Party: Star Rush features a total of 53 minigames, 12 of which are exclusive to the Coinathlon game mode. The game deviates from the franchise via its replacement of the traditional turn-based gameplay in favor of players moving simultaneously on non-linear, grid-like game boards. The player has an experience point-based "Party Level" that increases as they earn points based on performance, unlocking extra playable characters and game modes.

The main game mode is Toad Scramble, in which all four playable characters are different-colored Toads. Additional Mario characters appear on the boards and can be recruited as AI-controlled allies, allowing players to roll extra dice and receive help during boss battles. Each player can recruit up to four allies at a time. There are five worlds and fifteen game boards to choose from, most of which are gradually unlocked. During board games, items can be collected and used to enhance a player's score or hinder rivals. A free-for-all minigame is played every time a Coin Balloon is popped, giving players the opportunity to earn coins. On each board, players are all tasked with collecting the most Stars, which can be earned by coming first in boss battles. After a certain number of boss battles, the board game ends, and each player is awarded one Star for every ten coins collected. Additional Stars may be awarded based on random criteria, such as performing well in minigames or moving the fewest number of spaces.

In the Coinathlon mode, players race to complete a set number of laps on a board, repeatedly playing the same three minigames to earn coins and moving one space per coin collected. Items can be used to deduct coins from other players or prevent them from obtaining new ones. In the Mario Shuffle game mode, two players are each given two dice and three cardboard cutouts representing different playable characters, taking turns rolling both dice and moving a character toward their opponent's side of the board. Certain spaces send players forward or backward, jumping over a character stuns them and causes them to lose a turn, and landing on a character sends them back to the start of the board. There is only one board in this mode.

The Balloon Bash mode most closely resembles the traditional gameplay of the Mario Party series, with players earning coins in minigames and trading coins for Stars. Coins can also be spent on items such as additional dice at a shop. Similarly to in Toad Scramble, players roll dice and move around the board simultaneously. There are three small boards to choose from, and games can last between 10 and 30 turns. Rhythm Recital is a tap-based rhythm game mode wherein players use musical instruments to add musical notes to iconic tracks from the Mario franchise, such as the overworld themes from Super Mario Bros. (1985) and Super Mario 3D World (2013). Another game mode, Challenge Tower, functions as a vertical version of Minesweeper; the player climbs one level of a randomly generated tower at a time, with the blocks they land on lighting up to indicate whether there are zero, one, two, or three dangerous surrounding blocks. Boo's Block Party is a match-three game mode in which players compete with rotating blocks numbered from one to four. Boo's Block Party features both an endless mode and a versus mode.

Although Mario Party: Star Rush lacks an online multiplayer mode, the Nintendo 3DS's Download Play functionality provides a local multiplayer option, allowing up to four nearby people to play together using only one game card. A free piece of software available on the Nintendo eShop, Mario Party: Star Rush – Party Guest, also allows up to four players to experience the multiplayer game modes with only one copy of the game. Additionally, this software saves certain data, such as unlocked characters and minigames, which could be transferred to a complete copy of the game. This service became unavailable for purchase upon Nintendo's closure of the Wii U and 3DS eShops on March 27, 2023. Mario Party: Star Rush is compatible with several of Nintendo's Amiibo, figurines that can be scanned to give players advantages such as unlocking playable characters, recruiting allies, and receiving special items.

== Development and release ==
Nintendo announced Mario Party: Star Rush on June 14, 2016, in a press release for the 2017 Nintendo Switch title The Legend of Zelda: Breath of the Wild during its E3 2016 coverage. Video game journalists described the announcement as "hidden" and "buried" due to it appearing at the end of the press release. Additional details were shown in an official trailer the following day, including competitive boss battles and the ability to pick up allies in the Toad Scramble mode. Shortly after the game's announcement, Twitter users commented on its box art's being reused from other projects, including the label of SpaghettiOs canned pasta.

Mario Party: Star Rush's removal of the series's traditional turn-based gameplay in favor of simultaneous movement was intended to make the game much more fast-paced and better suited for portable play. Following Star Rush's announcement, Engadget's Sean Buckley praised the "more hectic" simultaneous movement as a "fast-paced upgrade" that required less waiting from players. Buckley additionally complimented the non-linear game boards, writing that the new system "opens the game up to more robust strategies". Moreover, Destructoid's Chris Carter expressed approval with the removal of the car-based gameplay from the game's two home console predecessors, in which all players take turns driving a shared vehicle, with dice rolls advancing the entire team forward. Pocket Gamer's Clement Renaudin also noted the removal of the car mechanic, as well as the new movement system for "opening up new strategies and possibilities like blocking other players".

Mario Party: Star Rush was developed by NDcube and published by Nintendo as the second installment in the series for the Nintendo 3DS – following Mario Party: Island Tour (2013) – as well as the fourth handheld Mario Party title overall. Star Rush was released in Europe on October 7, 2016; in Australia on October 8, 2016; in Japan on October 20, 2016; and in North America on November 4, 2016. The game was launched alongside seven new Amiibo figurines, including Princess Daisy, Waluigi, and a glow-in-the-dark Boo.

== Reception ==
=== Critical response ===
Reception

Aggregate scores
Aggregator	Score
Metacritic	68/100
OpenCritic	18% recommend

Review scores
Publication	Score
Destructoid	5.5/10
Famitsu	7/10, 8/10, 8/10, 9/10
Game Informer	6.5/10
IGN	5.2/10
Nintendo Life	7/10
Nintendo World Report	7.5/10
Gamereactor	5/10

Mario Party: Star Rush received "mixed or average" reviews from critics, according to the review aggregation website Metacritic. Fellow review aggregator OpenCritic assessed that the game received fair approval, being recommended by 18% of critics. Summarizing the game for Nintendo Life, Thomas Whitehead wrote: "Mario Party: Star Rush may not excel in many ways, but it addresses some complaints from past entries and delivers some harmless entertainment."

The removal of the car-based mechanic from the game's two home console predecessors elicited praise from Destructoid's Jed Whitaker, who viewed Star Rush as the best installment in the Mario Party series since Mario Party 8 (2007). Thomas Whitehead of Nintendo Life believed that the replacement of the vehicle gimmick would address "consistent complaints" from fans of the Mario Party series. Reviewers also praised the new system of players rolling dice and moving around boards simultaneously; Whitaker wrote that the new mechanic "can lead to a lot of strategic moves", Jose Otero of IGN added that it made the game better suited for portable play, and Daan Koopman of Nintendo World Report found that the system "really helps speed things along". Koopman likewise complimented the new ability for players to move more freely on boards, finding it to be "a refreshing change". Three of the four reviewers in Famitsu added that new dice mechanic enhanced the pace of the gameplay. Praise was also given to the game's local multiplayer options, especially the free Party Guest software; Game Informer's Brian Shea described the demo as "a nice workaround that breaks down the handheld multiplayer barrier", while Gamereactor's Jonas Mäki complimented both Party Guest and Download Play for enabling easily accessible multiplayer without requiring players to purchase multiple copies of the game, despite adding that "the problem of getting four people to sit together each with a 3DS in hand remains".

Critics were divided on the game modes, which IGN's Jose Otero referred to as "simply forgettable" due to board games relying on repetitive random events and luck. Nintendo Life's Thomas Whitehead enjoyed the main game mode, Toad Scramble, especially when playing on more complicated boards, while Nintendo World Report's Daan Koopman complimented the number of maps to select from. Both reviewers singled out Coinathlon as their favorite mode; Whitehead said the mode was "ideal for quick portable play", whereas Koopman enjoyed the unique set of minigames. Brian Shea of Game Informer was more critical of Coinathlon, deriding it as "a repetitive mess" due to the repetitiveness of its three minigames.

Critics were also divided on the Mario Shuffle mode, which Nintendo Life's Thomas Whitehead deemed both "an odd misstep" and "possibly the weakest inclusion in the game", with IGN's Jose Otero adding that it was "another quick and forgettable mode". Nintendo World Report's Daan Koopman found this mode fun but unlikely to be replayed due to having only one board, whereas Game Informer's Brian Shea was "pleasantly surprised" and found his "most thrilling moment" in this mode. Shea said his favorite mode was Balloon Bash, which he believed most resembled traditional Mario Party gameplay, though other reviewers criticized the low number of boards for this mode, as well as the high amount of luck involved. The Rhythm Recital mode was generally criticized due to a lack of difficulty settings, as well as the players' musical notes not matching the instrumental themes. The Challenge Tower mode received a more positive response from critics, being referred to by Koopman as "surprisingly addictive".

In terms of the minigame selection, Nintendo Life's Thomas Whitehead said they were "generally effective and enjoyable", Game Informer's Brian Shea opined that they "were more hit or miss than ever before", and Nintendo World Report's Daan Koopman wrote that "although there could be more variety in the minigames", he found that the games that were there were "a lot of fun". The boss minigames in particular were praised, being described as "entertaining tests of reaction time, memory and even rhythm", as well as "among the strongest minigames available". However, Destructoid's Jed Whitaker complained of a lack of minigames and overall content, noting that Star Rush contained 53 minigames compared to Island Tour's 81, making Star Rush "hardly recommendable". Retrospectively, Jesse Lennox of Digital Trends placed Star Rush second to last in a ranking of 18 Mario Party games, adding that it included only three more minigames than the original Mario Party (1998).

=== Sales ===
In Japan, Mario Party: Star Rush sold more than 26,000 units in the first week of its release, placing it at #2 on the sales charts, behind Battlefield 1. This marked a significant decrease from the 50,000 units sold by the game's predecessor, Mario Party 10 (2015), as well as the 132,000 units sold by the previous handheld title, Mario Party: Island Tour, during their respective debut weeks in Japan. As of December 16, 2016, Mario Party: Star Rush had sold more than 88,000 copies in Japan.

=== Legacy ===
Mario Party: Star Rush was succeeded by Mario Party: The Top 100, a 2017 minigame compilation for the 3DS. Toad Scramble's mechanic of recruiting non-player characters as allies and using their dice returned in Super Mario Party, a 2018 title for the Nintendo Switch. This system would later return in Super Mario Party Jamboree, a 2024 title for the Switch, with players now recruiting allies by winning minigames.

== See also ==
- List of party video games
- List of video games featuring Mario
- 2016 in video games
