= The Legend of Zelda 3DS =

Zelda 3DS may refer to:

- The Legend of Zelda: Ocarina of Time 3D, a 2011 remake of The Legend of Zelda: Ocarina of Time
- The Legend of Zelda: A Link Between Worlds, a 2013 sequel to The Legend of Zelda: A Link to the Past
- The Legend of Zelda: Majora's Mask 3D, a 2015 remake of The Legend of Zelda: Majora's Mask
- The Legend of Zelda: Tri Force Heroes, a 2015 video game
