= Pig tail =

Pig tail (and variants) may refer to:

== Hair dressing ==
- Pigtail, tightly braided hair, usually in one or two braids
- Bunches, another hair style sometimes called pigtails
- Queue (hairstyle), sometimes called “pigtails”

== Animals ==
- Pig tail (also referred to as pork tail), the tail of a domestic pig used as food
- Northern pig-tailed macaque
- Pig-tailed langur
- Southern pig-tailed macaque
- Pig-tailed macaque

== Other ==
- Pig tail stent, a type of ureteric stent
- Buta no shippo, a game
- Pig-tail Hex/Jinx, a spell in the Harry Potter universe
- Pigtail connector, a kind of electrical connector
- PIG Tail (Phosphatidylinositol glycan), a membrane anchor for proteins; more commonly called GPI anchor

== See also ==
- pig (disambiguation)
- Pig (disambiguation)
