= Clubhouse Games: 51 Worldwide Classics =

2020 video game

- Icon artwork used in Europe and Australia
- Developer: NDcube (Note: Additional work done by CAProduction)
- Publisher: Nintendo
- Director: Atsushi Nakao
- Producers: Toshiaki Suzuki; Toyokazu Nonaka; Takashi Tezuka; Katsuya Eguchi
- Designers: Makoto Eguchi; Hiroyuki Seki; Ryou Yokomizo; Yuya Rokuyama
- Programmer: Tadao Shoyama
- Artist: Takahiro Karino
- Composer: Toshiki Aida
- Platform: Nintendo Switch
- Release: June 5, 2020
- Genres: Party, tabletop game
- Modes: Single-player, multiplayer

Clubhouse Games: 51 Worldwide Classics, (Note: Known in Japan as Worldwide Collection of 51 Games (世界のアソビ大全51, Sekai No Asobi Taizen 51)) known as 51 Worldwide Games in Europe and Australia, is a 2020 party video game developed by NDcube and published by Nintendo for the Nintendo Switch. The game is a successor to Clubhouse Games for the Nintendo DS and is a compilation of board, card, tabletop, and toy sports games from around the world. The game sold more than four million copies by April 2022.

== Gameplay ==
Upon starting the game, the player chooses a toy figurine as an avatar and assigns a favorite game to it. This allows other players to see a globe where they can pick that game. These figurines act as guides for the games and offer trivia on the game, such as its history.

In addition to the games, there is a bonus Piano game included with the collection. Various games allow for motion control through the use of the Joy-Con controllers. An unlockable Mario-themed card deck can be used for certain card games.

=== Games ===
#	Name
1	Mancala
2	Dots and Boxes
3	Yacht Dice
4	Four-in-a-Row
5	Hit and Blow
6	Nine Men's Morris
7	Hex
8	Checkers
9	Hare and Hounds
10	Gomoku
11	Dominoes
12	Chinese Checkers
13	Ludo
14	Backgammon
15	Renegade
16	Chess
17	Shogi
18	Mini Shogi
19	Hanafuda
20	Riichi Mahjong
21	Last Card
22	Blackjack
23	Texas Hold'em
24	President
25	Sevens
26	Speed
27	Matching
28	War
29	Takoyaki
30	Pig's Tail
31	Golf
32	Billiards
33	Bowling
34	Darts
35	Carrom
36	Toy Tennis
37	Toy Soccer
38	Toy Curling
39	Toy Boxing
40	Toy Baseball
41	Air Hockey
42	Slot Cars
43	Fishing
44	Battle Tanks
45	Team Tanks
46	Shooting Gallery
47	6-Ball Puzzle
48	Sliding Puzzle
49	Mahjong Solitaire
50	Klondike Solitaire
51	Spider Solitaire

In solo play, the player plays against CPU opponents (if the game requires them) and can change the difficulty accordingly. Multiplayer games can be played locally in single-system play (with some exceptions) or via local wireless depending on the game. A multiplayer mode called "Mosaic Mode" allows for multiple Nintendo Switch consoles to link together to display one larger multi-monitor picture in games like Slot Cars, where one track is displayed over four screens. Most of the games included can be played online, either with matchmaking modes or lobbies with friends.

"Clubhouse Games Guest Pass", known as "Local Multiplayer Guest Edition" in PAL regions and "Pocket Edition" in Japan, is a free application on the Nintendo eShop which includes all 51 games but with only Dominoes, Four-in-a-Row, President, and Slot Cars available in single player mode. It allows players to create lobbies with others who own the free application, and it allows them to join lobbies hosted by players who own the full game and play any of the multiplayer games available.

== Development ==
Clubhouse Games: 51 Worldwide Classics was developed by NDcube, who had previously developed Super Mario Party for the Nintendo Switch. The game was revealed in Nintendo Direct Mini presentation held in March 2020, with a trailer revealing the complete list of games featured in the compilation. A follow-up overview trailer was released in Japan and North America in the same year. Certain game elements resemble those seen in the Wii U's E3 2011 reveal trailer, in which Renegade, Checkers, and Chess were shown on the Wii U GamePad. The courses in Golf are recreations of the nine holes from Wii Sports, which themselves were inspired by the courses from Golf for the NES.

== Reception ==
Reception

Aggregate scores
Aggregator	Score
Metacritic	82/100
OpenCritic	82% recommend

Review scores
Publication	Score
4Players	78/100
Destructoid	8.5/10
Electronic Gaming Monthly	5/5
Eurogamer	Recommended
Hardcore Gamer	4/5
Jeuxvideo.com	16/20
Nintendo Life	8/10
Nintendo World Report	8.5/10
Polygon	Recommended
USgamer	4.5/5
VG247	4/5

In July 2020, Nintendo published the global popularity statistics of each game, with 1.5 million players of dots and boxes.

Clubhouse Games: 51 Worldwide Classics received generally favorable reviews from critics, according to the review aggregation website Metacritic. Fellow review aggregator OpenCritic assessed that the game received strong approval, being recommended by 82% of critics.

The game received generally positive reviews, mostly attributed to the presentation, the selection of games available, the large focus on single player content, online features, and matchmaking. The AI for the game was also praised as surprisingly tough. Ben Kuchera of Polygon praised the game selection in a simple package and the tutorials. Christian Donlan of Eurogamer praised the presentation, polish, and atmosphere. Chris Scullion of Nintendo Life commended the online matchmaking's attempt to not keep players waiting by cuing other players in on what games they selected. Common complaints included a lack of 3-to-4 player multiplayer game options, omissions of certain games, and a lack of support for all Nintendo Switch play styles.

=== Sales ===
The game reached the top 10 of sales charts for the week of June 1–7, 2020 in Japan with 64,443 copies sold, placing second behind Animal Crossing: New Horizons. Worldwide sales had reached 4.22 million copies as of March 2022, making it the 31st best-selling game on the Nintendo Switch. As of December 2022, the game has sold 4.64 million copies.
