= Two-ten-jack =

Japanese card game

Two-ten-jack is a Japanese trick-taking card game for two players that takes its name from the three highest-scoring (and lowest-scoring) cards in the game: the 2, 10 and Jack in three different suits.

== Play ==
=== Preliminaries ===
The object of two-ten-jack is to get the most points by taking tricks containing positive point cards while avoiding tricks containing negative point cards.

Two players receive six or seven cards each from a standard 52-card deck ranking A K Q J 10 9 8 7 6 5 4 3 2 and the remaining undealt cards are placed between the players to form the stock. Non-dealer leads the first trick and winner of each trick leads to the next. Players replenish their hands between tricks by each drawing a card from the stock with the winner of the last trick drawing first. Play continues until all of the cards in the entire deck have been played. Points are then tallied before the deck is reshuffled and dealt anew.

=== Following, Trumping, and Speculation ===
In two-ten-jack a player may lead any card and the other player must play a card of the same suit if able, or otherwise must play a trump card if able. If a player has neither cards in the lead suit or trump, then any other card may be played. The highest trump card, or the highest card of the lead suit if no trumps were played, takes the trick

In two-ten-jack hearts are always the trump suit and the ace of spades is a special trump card known as speculation ranking above all of the hearts. Rules for playing speculation are as follows:

- If a trump (heart) is led, a player may follow with speculation and must play speculation if no other trumps are held in the hand.
- If a spade is led, a player may follow with speculation and must likewise play speculation if no other spades are held in the hand.
- If a club or diamond is led and the other player has neither of these, speculation may be played, and must be played if no other trumps are available.
- A player leading speculation must declare it as either a spade or trump.

=== Scoring and winning ===
Cards are worth the following point values:

- 2♥, 10♥ and J♥ are worth +5 each
- 2♣, 10♣ and J♣ are worth -5 each
- 2♠, 10♠, J♠ and A♠ are worth +1 each
- 6♦ is worth +1 point

Hence the total number of card points per deal is +5. Winner is the first player to reach 31 points.

== See also ==
- List of Japanese games
