= E3 2016 =

22nd annual Electronic Entertainment Expo

Electronic Entertainment Expo 2016
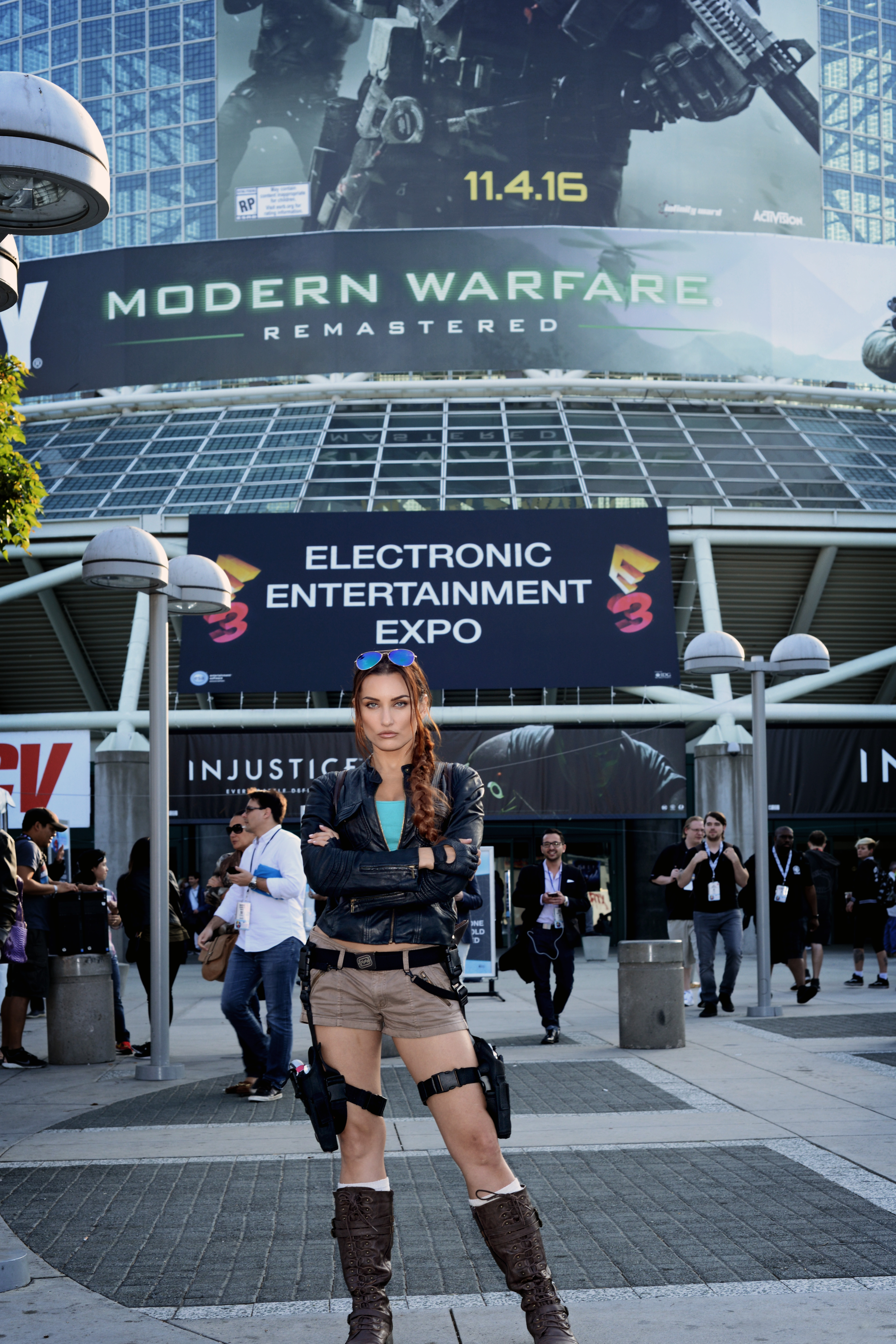
- E3 at the Los Angeles Convention Center in Los Angeles, California on June 14, 2016
- Genre: Multi-genre
- Begins: June 14, 2016
- Ends: June 16, 2016
- Venue: Los Angeles Convention Center
- Locations: Los Angeles, California
- Country: United States
- Previous event: E3 2015
- Next event: E3 2017
- Attendance: 50,300
- Organizer: Entertainment Software Association
- Filing status: Non-profit

The Electronic Entertainment Expo 2016 (E3 2016) was the 22nd E3, during which hardware manufacturers and software developers and publishers from the video game industry presented new and upcoming products to attendees, primarily retailers and members of the video game press. The event, organized by the Entertainment Software Association, took place at the Los Angeles Convention Center from June 14–16, 2016. Approximately 50,300 people attended the event, slightly down from the previous year's. The focus of E3 2016 was primarily on new software titles for the 8th generation of video game consoles, with new hardware revisions and auxiliary equipment to support the growing market sectors of 4K resolution displays and virtual reality headsets.

The Expo started two days after the mass shooting at an Orlando, Florida nightclub. It was also three days after the murder of American singer and YouTuber Christina Grimmie, who had been scheduled to make an appearance at the event. To show support for victims of the tragedies, the exhibitors at the Expo made changes to their presentations and plans. Flags outside the Convention Center were lowered to half-mast. Bethesda and Nintendo presenters wore rainbow-colored ribbon pins during their press conferences in support of the victims, and Microsoft and the aforementioned Nintendo opened their presentations with a moment of silence for Grimmie and the other victims. Sony's chairman Shawn Layden started his presentation with a brief speech on the Orlando shooting, and Nintendo president Reggie Fils-Aimé gave his condolences to Grimmie's family and fans before starting his keynote speech. Other developers altered their approach to social media announcements during the Expo in the wake of current events.

== Press conferences ==
=== Square Enix ===
Square Enix hosted a Deus Ex Universe pre-E3 press conference on June 8 at 8:30 a.m. During the conference, a 17-minute demo for Deus Ex: Mankind Divided was shown along with a new game mode called Breach, as well as the 3rd game in the Square Enix Go franchise, Deus Ex Go.

=== Electronic Arts ===
Electronic Arts hosted its press conference on June 12 at 1:00 p.m. as part of their own EA Play event. (Note: Electronic Arts' conference was part of their own EA Play event. The event was set to be held from June 12 to 13, with the last day being completely dedicated to E3's attendees.) During the conference, EA showed two new trailers for Titanfall 2, gameplay of Battlefield 1, a behind-the-scenes look at Mass Effect: Andromeda and updates on upcoming Star Wars games from EA. The game company also revealed a teaser trailer for Madden NFL 17, a new game mode for FIFA 17, and a new project called EA Originals, which will help to publish titles created by indie developers, with the first such title being Fe.

=== Bethesda ===
Bethesda hosted its second press conference on June 12 at 7:00 p.m. During the conference, a remaster of The Elder Scrolls V: Skyrim was revealed, along with new DLC content and VR versions for The Elder Scrolls Online, Doom and Fallout 4 and an intro for The Elder Scrolls: Legends. Trailers, gameplay, and release windows were shown for Prey, Quake Champions and Dishonored 2.

=== Microsoft ===
Microsoft hosted a press conference on June 13 at 9:30 a.m. During the conference, Microsoft unveiled the Xbox One S—a new revision of the original Xbox One model with a smaller form factor and 4K video support (released August 2016), and teased "Project Scorpio"—later named Xbox One X, a higher-end version of the console scheduled for 2017. New trailers were shown for Gears of War 4, Halo Wars 2, Inside, Tekken 7, Killer Instinct, ReCore, Scalebound and Sea of Thieves, along with reveals of Dead Rising 4, State of Decay 2 and Forza Horizon 3. Additional announcements were made for new Xbox Live functionality, the Xbox Play Anywhere program that would allow users to play purchased supported Xbox One games on their Windows 10 computers without having to re-purchase the game and enable cross-platform play capabilities between the two platforms, and an Elite Wireless Controller themed to Gears of War 4, as well as the reveal of Xbox Design Lab and a demo for Final Fantasy XV.

=== PC Gaming Show ===
PC Gamer hosted the second PC Gaming Show on June 13 at 12:00 p.m. AMD announced two new graphic processor cards for PC gaming, and demonstrated a prototype wearable VR unit using an Alienware system with an AMD graphics card worn on a person's back. Warren Spector gave a short lecture appreciating the keyboard-and-mouse control schemes common to many PC games. Approximately twenty PC games were featured in the show, including expansions for Ark: Survival Evolved, Killing Floor 2, and Superhot and new games including Lawbreakers, Overland, The Turing Test, Dual Universe, Oxygen Not Included, Giant Cop, Mount & Blade II: Bannerlord, The Surge, Warhammer 40,000: Dawn of War III, and Vampyr.

=== Ubisoft ===
Ubisoft hosted a press conference on June 13 at 1:00 p.m. During the conference, new trailers and dates were shown for For Honor, Tom Clancy's Ghost Recon: Wildlands and South Park: The Fractured but Whole, along with demos of Watch Dogs 2 and Eagle Flight. Ubisoft also released the behind-the-scene footage of the Assassin's Creed movie, along with the reveals of Steep, Trials of the Blood Dragon, Grow Up, and Star Trek: Bridge Crew.

=== Sony ===
Sony Interactive Entertainment hosted a press conference on June 13 at 6:00 p.m. Sony announced the cost and release date of the PlayStation VR headset on October 13, 2016, with fifty games to be supported at launch; additional VR games announced included Batman: Arkham VR, Star Wars: Battlefront X-Wing VR, and Farpoint. Sony announced the release date for the long-awaited The Last Guardian for October 25, 2016, and a planned remastering of the first three Crash Bandicoot games. New games announced included a new God of War, Resident Evil 7, Death Stranding, Days Gone, and at the time unnamed Spider-Man to be developed by Insomniac Games.

=== Nintendo ===
Nintendo, continuing a precedence set at the previous three expos, decided to forego hosting either a traditional press conference or announcement video in favor of two separate day-long Treehouse Live shows. The first broadcast on June 14 was dedicated to the full reveal of The Legend of Zelda: Breath of the Wild and Pokémon Sun and Moon. The second broadcast on June 15 covered several other announced first-party titles, including the Pokémon Go Plus device that would work alongside the upcoming mobile game, Ever Oasis, Mario Party: Star Rush, Paper Mario: Color Splash, BoxBoxBoy!, and Rhythm Heaven Megamix, which was released that day on Nintendo's eShop. It also featured other third-party games that would appear on the Nintendo 3DS, including Monster Hunter Generations, Dragon Quest VII: Fragments of the Forgotten Past, and Yo-kai Watch 2.

Nintendo made the unorthodox decision to not present the then-unrevealed Nintendo Switch (at this point still known as by its codename, "NX") at E3 2016, despite the console being due for an early 2017 release. At a shareholders meeting following E3, Shigeru Miyamoto stated that this was due to concerns of competitors copying from it if they revealed it too soon. Nintendo's presence on the show floor was devoted exclusively to Breath of the Wild.

== List of notable exhibitors ==
Several major exhibitors who had attended the previous E3 exhibitions were not present. Activision opted to forgo a booth at the show, instead featuring their upcoming games through other publishers that would be there, such as allowing Sony to showcase Call of Duty: Infinite Warfare. Electronic Arts opted to hold their EA Play event separate from E3, and forgo any floor space at the show. Both Disney Interactive Studios (which ceased to operate as an independent developer effective May 2016) and Wargaming opted to not present in the event.

The following is a partial list of vendors that had exhibitions during the convention:

- Bethesda Softworks
- Deep Silver
- Electronic Arts
- Focus Home Interactive
- Koei Tecmo
- Microsoft Studios
- Nintendo
- Sega
- Sony Interactive Entertainment
- Square Enix
- Take-Two Interactive
- Ubisoft

== List of featured games ==
This is a list of notable titles that appeared at E3 2016.

2K Games: Battleborn (PC / PS4 / Xbox One); Civilization VI (PC); Civilization Revolution 2 Plus (Vita); Mafia III (PC / PS4 / Xbox One); WWE 2K17 (PS3 / PS4 / Xbox 360 / Xbox One); 505 Games: Abzû (PC / PS4); Assetto Corsa (PS4 / Xbox One); Portal Knights (PC); Prominence Poker (PC); Rocket League (PC / PS4 / Xbox One); Activision (Note: While Activision did not participate in this year's E3, their game was revealed by their partner.): Call of Duty: Infinite Warfare (PC / PS4 / Xbox One); Call of Duty: Modern Warfare Remastered (PC / PS4 / Xbox One); Crash Bandicoot N. Sane Trilogy (PS4); Destiny: Rise of Iron (PS4 / Xbox One); Skylanders: Imaginators (PS3 / PS4 / Wii U / Xbox 360 / Xbox One); Anuman: Moto Racer 4 (PC / PS4 / Xbox One); Syberia 3 (PC / PS4 / Xbox One); Yesterday Origins (PC / PS4 / Xbox One); Bandai Namco Entertainment: Dragon Ball Xenoverse 2 (PC / PS4 / Xbox One); God Eater 2: Rage Burst (PS4 / Vita / PC); JoJo's Bizarre Adventure: Eyes of Heaven (PS4); Mobile Suit Gundam: Extreme Vs-Force (Vita); Necropolis (PC / PS4 / Xbox One); Sword Art Online: Hollow Realization (PS4 / Vita); Tales of Berseria (PS4 / PC); Tekken 7 (PC / PS4 / Xbox One); Warhammer 40,000: Eternal Crusade (PC / PS4 / Xbox One); Bethesda Softworks: Dishonored 2 (PC / PS4 / Xbox One); Doom: Unto the Evil (PC / PS4 / Xbox One); The Elder Scrolls: Legends (PC / iOS / Android); The Elder Scrolls Online: Dark Brotherhood (PC / PS4 / Xbox One); The Elder Scrolls: Skyrim – Special Edition (PC / PS4 / Xbox One); Fallout 4 (PC / PS4 / Xbox One / HTC Vive); Fallout Shelter (PC / iOS / Android); Prey (PC / PS4 / Xbox One); Quake Champions (PC); Bigben Interactive: WRC 6 (PC / PS4 / Xbox One); Capcom: Monster Hunter Generations (3DS); Resident Evil 7: Biohazard (PC / PS4 / PSVR / Xbox One); CD Projekt: Gwent: The Witcher Card Game (PC / PS4 / Xbox One); Chucklefish: Stardew Valley (PC / PS4 / Wii U / Xbox One); Codemasters: F1 2016 (PC / PS4 / Xbox One); Compulsion Games: We Happy Few (PC / Xbox One); Deep Silver: Agents of Mayhem (PC / PS4 / Xbox One); Devolver Digital: Absolver (PC / PS4 / Xbox One); Eitr (PC / PS4); Mother Russia Bleeds (PC / PS4); Serious Sam VR (Oculus Rift); Shadow Warrior 2 (PC / PS4 / Xbox One); Electronic Arts: Battlefield 1 (PC / PS4 / Xbox One); Fe (PC / PS4 / Xbox One); FIFA 17 (Android / iOS / PC / PS3 / PS4 / Xbox 360 / Xbox One); Madden NFL 17 (PS3 / PS4 / Xbox 360 / Xbox One); Mass Effect: Andromeda (PC / PS4 / Xbox One); NHL 17 (PS4 / Xbox One); Star Wars Battlefront: X-Wing VR Missions (PSVR); Titanfall 2 (PC / PS4 / Xbox One)	Focus Home Interactive: Farming Simulator 17 (PC / PS4 / Xbox One); Mordheim: City of the Damned (PC / Xbox One); Shiness: The Lightning Kingdom (TBA); Space Hulk: Deathwing (PC / PS4 / Xbox One); The Surge (PC / PS4 / Xbox One); Styx: Shards of Darkness (PC / PS4 / Xbox One); The Technomancer (PC / PS4 / Xbox One); Vampyr (PC / PS4 / Xbox One); GungHo Online Entertainment: Let It Die (PS4); Inti Creates: Azure Striker Gunvolt 2 (3DS); Bloodstained: Ritual of the Night (PC / Wii U / Vita / PS4 / Xbox One); Gal*Gun: Double Peace (PS4 / Vita); Mighty No. 9 (PC / Wii U / 3DS / Vita / PS3 / PS4 / Xbox 360 / Xbox One); Shantae: Half-Genie Hero (PC / Wii U / Vita / PS3 / PS4 / Xbox 360 / Xbox One); Kadokawa Corporation: Demon Gaze II (Vita); God Wars: Beyond Time (PS4 / Vita); Project Code: Daten (PS4 / Vita); Root Letter (PS4 / Vita); Koei Tecmo: Attack on Titan (PC / PS3 / PS4 / Vita / Xbox One); Nioh (PS4); Untitled Omega Force project; Konami: Pro Evolution Soccer 2017 (PC / PS4 / Xbox One); Microsoft Studios: Dead Rising 4 (PC / Xbox One); Forza Horizon 3 (PC / Xbox One); Gears of War 4 (PC / Xbox One); Halo Wars 2 (PC / Xbox One); Inside (PC / Xbox One); Killer Instinct (PC / Xbox One); Minecraft (iOS / Android / PC); ReCore (PC / Xbox One); Scalebound (PC / Xbox One); Sea of Thieves (PC / Xbox One); State of Decay 2 (PC / Xbox One); Natsume Inc.: Harvest Moon: Skytree Village (3DS); River City: Tokyo Rumble (3DS); Wild Guns: Reloaded (PS4); Nintendo: BoxBoxBoy! (3DS); Dragon Quest VII: Fragments of the Forgotten Past (3DS); Ever Oasis (3DS); The Legend of Zelda: Breath of the Wild (Wii U / Switch); Mario Party: Star Rush (3DS); Paper Mario: Color Splash (Wii U); Pokémon Go (iOS / Android); Pokémon Sun and Moon (3DS); Rhythm Heaven Megamix (3DS); Tokyo Mirage Sessions ♯FE (Wii U); Yo-kai Watch 2 (3DS); Nordic Games: Battle Chasers: Nightwar (PC / PS4 / Xbox One); ELEX (PC / PS4 / Xbox One); The Guild 3 (PC); SpellForce 3 (PC); Paradox Interactive: Tyranny (PC); Sega: 7th Dragon III Code: VFD (3DS); Persona 5 (PS3 / PS4); Sonic Boom: Fire & Ice (3DS); Warhammer 40,000: Dawn of War III (PC); Yakuza 0 (PS4)	Semanoor International: Badiya (PC / PS4 / Xbox One); Sony Interactive Entertainment: Days Gone (PS4); Death Stranding (PS4); Detroit: Become Human (PS4); Farpoint (PSVR); God of War (PS4); Gran Turismo Sport (PS4); Gravity Rush 2 (PS4); Horizon Zero Dawn (PS4); The Last Guardian (PS4); Spider-Man (PS4); Square Enix: Black the Fall (PC); Deus Ex Go (iOS / Android); Deus Ex: Mankind Divided (PC / PS4 / Xbox One); Final Fantasy XII: The Zodiac Age (PS4); Final Fantasy XIV: Heavensward (PC / PS3 / PS4); Final Fantasy XV (PS4 / PSVR / Xbox One); Final Fantasy: Brave Exvius (iOS / Android); Hitman (PC / PS4 / Xbox One); I Am Setsuna (PC / PS4 / Vita); Just Cause 3: Land Mech Assault (PC / PS4 / Xbox One); Kingdom Hearts HD 2.8 Final Chapter Prologue (PS4); Nier: Automata (PS4); Star Ocean: Integrity and Faithlessness (PS3 / PS4); The Turing Test (PC); Valentino Rossi: The Game (PC / PS4 / Xbox One); World of Final Fantasy (PS4 / Vita); Team17: Overcooked (PC); Strength of the Sword Ultimate (PC / PS4 / Vita / Wii U / Xbox One); Worms W.M.D (PC / PS4 / Xbox One); Yooka-Laylee (PC / PS4 / Wii U / Xbox One); Telltale Games: Batman: The Telltale Series (Android / iOS / OS X / PC / PS3 / PS4 / Xbox 360 / Xbox One); The Walking Dead: Season Three (TBA); Ubisoft: Eagle Flight (Oculus Rift); For Honor (PC / PS4 / Xbox One); Grow Up (PC / PS4 / Xbox One); Just Dance 2017 (PC / PS3 / PS4 / Switch / Wii / Wii U / Xbox 360 / Xbox One); South Park: The Fractured but Whole (PC / PS4 / Xbox One); Star Trek: Bridge Crew (Oculus Rift); Steep (PC / PS4 / Xbox One); Tom Clancy's The Division — Underground (PC / PS4 / Xbox One); Tom Clancy's Ghost Recon Wildlands (PC / PS4 / Xbox One); Trials of the Blood Dragon (PC / PS4 / Xbox One); Watch Dogs 2 (PC / PS4 / Xbox One); Xseed Games: Akiba's Beat (PS4 / Vita); Corpse Party (3DS); Exile's End (PS4 / Wii U / Vita); Fate/Extella: The Umbral Star (PS4 / Vita); The Legend of Heroes: Trails of Cold Steel II (PS3 / Vita); Shantae: Half-Genie Hero (PC / PS3 / PS4 / Vita / Wii U / Xbox 360 / Xbox One); Story of Seasons: Trio of Towns (3DS); Touhou: Scarlet Curiosity (PS4); Warner Bros. Interactive Entertainment: Batman: Arkham VR (PSVR); Injustice 2 (PS4 / Xbox One); Lego Dimensions (PS3 / PS4 / Wii U / Xbox 360 / Xbox One); Lego Star Wars: The Force Awakens (3DS / PC / PS3 / PS4 / Vita / Wii U / Xbox 360 / Xbox One); Lego Worlds (PC)

== Game Critics Awards ==
Following the Expo, journalists from over 40 different publications assembled and subsequently voted on games across various categories as their Best of E3 awards. The nominees were announced on June 29, 2016, and the winners on July 5, 2016.

In addition to the awards below, God of War received a "Special Commendation for Graphics".

Award	Winner	Other Nominees
Best of Show	The Legend of Zelda: Breath of the Wild (Nintendo)	Battlefield 1 (DICE/EA); Dishonored 2 (Arkane/Bethesda); Horizon: Zero Dawn (Guerilla/Sony Interactive Ent.); Sea of Thieves (Rare/Microsoft Studios); Titanfall 2 (Respawn/EA)
Best Original Game	Horizon: Zero Dawn (Guerrilla/Sony Interactive Ent.)	Abzu (Giant Squid/505 Games); Detroit: Become Human (Quantic Dream/Sony Interactive Ent.); Sea of Thieves (Rare/Microsoft Studios); We Happy Few (Compulsion Games)
Best Console Game	The Legend of Zelda: Breath of the Wild (Nintendo)	Battlefield 1 (DICE/EA); Dishonored 2 (Arkane/Bethesda); Horizon: Zero Dawn (Guerilla/Sony Interactive Ent.); The Last Guardian (genDESIGN/Sony Interactive Ent.)
Best PC Game	Civilization VI (Firaxis/2K)	Battlefield 1 (id Software/Bethesda); Dishonored 2 (Arkane/Bethesda); Gwent: The Witcher Card Game (CD Projekt Red); Warhammer 40,000: Dawn of War III (Relic/Sega)
Best VR Game	Batman: Arkham VR (Rocksteady/WBIE)	Resident Evil 7 (Capcom); Star Trek: Bridge Crew (Red Storm/Ubisoft); The Unspoken (Insomniac/Oculus Studio); Wilson's Heart (Twisted Pixel/Oculus Studio)
Best Hardware/Peripheral	PlayStation VR (Sony Interactive Entertainment)	Oculus Touch (Oculus VR); Xbox One S (Microsoft)
Best Action Game	Battlefield 1 (DICE/EA)	Call of Duty: Infinite Warfare (Infinity Ward/Activision); Gears of War 4 (The Coalition/Microsoft Studios); Lawbreakers (Boss Key/Nexon); Titanfall 2 (Respawn/EA)
Best Action/Adventure Game	The Legend of Zelda: Breath of the Wild (Nintendo)	Dishonored 2 (Arkane/Bethesda); Horizon: Zero Dawn (Guerrilla/Sony Interactive Ent); Mafia III (Hanger 13/2K); The Last Guardian (GenDesign/Sony Interactive Ent.)
Best RPG	Final Fantasy XV (Square Enix)	Deus Ex: Mankind Divided (Eidos Montreal/Square Enix); South Park: The Fractured But Whole (Ubisoft San Francisco/Ubisoft); Tyranny (Obsidian/Paradox); Persona 5 (Atlus)
Best Fighting Game	Injustice 2 (NetherRealm/WBIE)	Absolver (Sloclap/Devolver); Tekken 7 (Bandai Namco); The King of Fighters XIV (SNK/Atlus)
Best Racing Game	Forza Horizon 3 (Playground Games/Microsoft Studios)	F1 2016 (Codemasters); Gran Turismo Sport (Polyphony Digital/Sony Interactive Ent.)
Best Sports Game	Steep (Ubisoft Annecy/Ubisoft)	FIFA 17 (EA Canada/EA); Madden NFL 17 (Tiburon/EA); Pro Evolution Soccer 2017 (Konami)
Best Strategy Game	Civilization VI (Firaxis/2K)	Gwent: The Witcher Card Game (CD Projekt Red); Halo Wars 2 (Creative Assembly/343/Microsoft Studios); Warhammer 40,000: Dawn of War III (Relic/Sega)
Best Family Game	Skylanders: Imaginators (Toys for Bob/Activision)	Lego Dimensions (TT Games/WBIE); Lego Star Wars: The Force Awakens (TT Games/WBIE)
Best Online Multiplayer	Titanfall 2 (Respawn/EA)	Absolver (Sloclap/Devolver); Battlefield 1 (DICE/EA); Lawbreakers (Boss Key/Nexon); Sea of Thieves (RARE/Microsoft Studios)
Best Independent Game	Inside (Playdead)	Absolver (Sloclap/Devoler); Abzu (Giant Squid/505); Cuphead (Studio MDHR); We Happy Few (Compulsion Games)

== Into the Pixel Exhibition ==
The Into the Pixel exhibition, a collaboration between the Entertainment Software Association and the Academy of Interactive Arts & Sciences on display during E3, featured selected art that "push the interactive entertainment art form forward". The exhibit included selected concept art, in-game assets, and screenshots, from existing and upcoming games chosen from artist-submitted entries by a small jury. The fourteen games selected in 2016 include:

Dishonored 2; Dreadnought; Edge of Nowhere; Far Cry Primal; Guild Wars 2; Headlander; Layers of Fear	League of Legends; No Man's Sky; ReCore; Rush Blast; Song of the Deep; Unravel; The Witcher 3: Wild Hunt

== E3 Live ==
In prior years, there had been pressure on the ESA, the organizers of E3, to admit members of the public to the event. E3 is normally closed only to members of the video game industry and the media. As the video game industry is strongly driven by consumers and avid gamers, E3 has been criticized for denying them access to the event. In 2015, the ESA allocated 5000 tickets among the various floor exhibitors that they could give to fans to attend the expo.

For E3 2016, the ESA planned a separate three-day E3 Live event held from June 14–16, 2016 alongside the main E3 event for members of the public at L.A. Live, which neighbors the Convention Center. The event was free but required ticket reservations. E3 Live was promoted with the opportunity for its attendees to try the games and meet with members of the industry and selected company representatives, along with musical performances. This is the first time that E3 offered any opportunity for the public at large to attend the E3 event. According to ESA's Mike Gallagher, the intent of E3 Live was to provide to gamers that were not part of the industry "the chance to test-drive exciting new games, interact with some of their favorite developers, and be among the first in the world to enjoy groundbreaking game experiences".

The EA Live event drew about 20,000 people. According to James Brightman for GamesIndustry.biz, the event was underwhelming compared to what had been described, with only a few display areas among a small area. He spoke to those that attended who shared the same sentiment, that the promotion of the E3 Live event suggested there would be much more present.
