= Otedama =

Traditional Japanese children's game

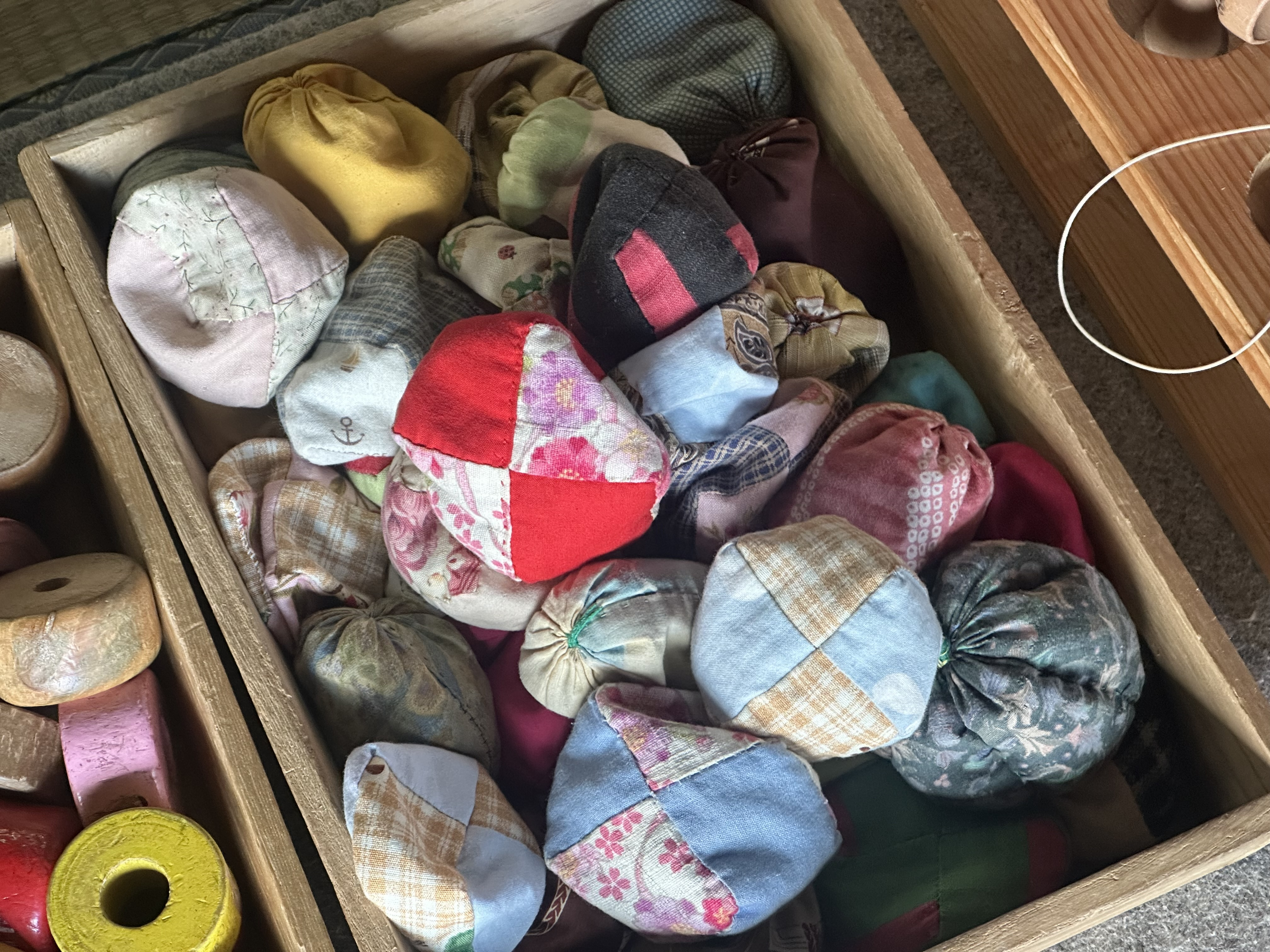
Pile of otedama

Otedama (お手玉) is a traditional Japanese children's game. Small bean bags are tossed and juggled in a game similar to jacks. Although it is generally a social game, Otedama can also be played alone. It is rarely competitive and often accompanied by singing. Otedama play is thought to be in decline.

== History ==
Otedama was transmitted to Japan from China in the Nara Period. It reached its peak of popularity in post-World War II Japan when other toys were unavailable. The bean bags, called ojami, were sewn together from strips of silk cloth and contained azuki beans. During war times, the beans were removed from the bags to feed children; as a result, there were almost no bean bags left in Japan. Otedama almost completely vanished from Japan because of this. In the early 1990s, a small group of people in Niihama created a club and annual convention to help restore otedama throughout Japan.

== Gameplay ==
Otedama was a very popular among girls and knowledge of the game was passed down from grandmother to granddaughter. Specific game play varies widely from region to region. Most play with five bean bags although some variations have been seen. Players take turns throwing and catching the bean bags. Each successive round increases in difficulty with balancing tricks and even juggling.

Otedama has two basic forms: nagedama (投げ玉) and yosedama (よせ玉). Nagedama resembles western juggling with small bean bags. Yosedama is more akin to jacks but bean bags are used instead of jacks.

== See also ==
- Knucklebones
