= Ever Oasis =

2017 video game

- North American and PAL region cover art
- Developer: Grezzo
- Publisher: Nintendo
- Director: Koichi Ishii
- Producers: Koichi Ishii; Toyokazu Nonaka; Toshiharu Izuno
- Designers: Hiroyuki Kuwata; Kyouji Koizumi; Junichi Shinomiya
- Programmer: Shinji Takeda
- Artists: Yoshinori Shizuma; Yuichiro Takao; Airi Yoshioka
- Writers: Katsumi Kuga; Shuntaro Tahara; Momoka Iseki; Shino Nakamura
- Composer: Sebastian Schwartz
- Platform: Nintendo 3DS
- Release: NA: June 23, 2017; EU: June 23, 2017; AU: June 24, 2017; JP: July 13, 2017
- Genre: Action role-playing
- Mode: Single-player

Ever Oasis (Note: Known in Japan as Ever Oasis: Spirit and the Mirage of the Seed People (Japanese: Ever Oasis(エヴァーオアシス) 精霊(せいれい)とタネビトの蜃気楼(ミラージュ), Hepburn: Evā Oashisu Seirei to Tanebito no Mirāju)) is a 2017 action role-playing game developed by Grezzo and published by Nintendo for the Nintendo 3DS. Unveiled at E3 2016, it was released in North America, Europe, and Oceania in June 2017 and in Japan the following month. It was directed and produced by the designer Koichi Ishii, known for his work on the Final Fantasy and Mana series.

The story follows a young Seedling born from the Great Tree, working with the water spirit, Esna, to build the last oasis in a vast desert and helping out new residents along the way. The gameplay combines action role-playing gameplay elements with town-building simulation and dungeon crawling. The player is tasked with managing the oasis and adventuring into the surrounding desert to combat enemies, collect materials and exploring dungeons.

Ever Oasis was positively received, with the town-building simulation aspects, presentation and orchestral score receiving particular praise. Some critics found the opening slow and the story shallow.

== Gameplay ==
Ever Oasis is an action role-playing game featuring elements of town management, dungeon exploration, and hack-and-slash gameplay. Players assume the role of a young Seedling named Tethu or Tethi, depending on which gender the player chooses, who is tasked by a water spirit named Esna with building and managing the last remaining oasis in a desert world threatened by a corrupted element called Chaos. The two primary gameplay modes, oasis management and desert exploration, are intended to link and support each other in a cycle.

=== Town management ===
In Ever Oasis, the player navigates the Oasis as Tethu, where the town management gameplay takes place.

The oasis is the central hub and home base. The player expands it by recruiting travelers and residents from the various tribes encountered across the desert, with each new resident contributing to the oasis's population and overall level. Once recruited, residents can open Bloom Booths; personalized shops that line the oasis's main street and sell a variety of items, ranging from potions and juices to weapons, robes, and turbans. The player is responsible for keeping these shops stocked by supplying residents with materials gathered in the field; in return, a share of the resulting profits is collected in the form of Dewadems, the game's currency. Bloom Booths can be ranked up by restocking them consistently and completing quests on behalf of their owners. Not all Oasis residents are able to open shops; some members of other tribes serve primarily as party members for combat and exploration.

=== Dungeon crawling ===
Ever Oasis also doubles as a traditional dungeon crawler action role-playing game.

Outside the town management gameplay, Ever Oasis doubles as a dungeon crawler action role-playing game. Combat is in real-time; where the player can lock onto enemies, deal weak and strong attacks, dodge and execute elemental magic spells. A party of up to three other characters recruited from the Oasis can join the player in a party if selected. An AI controls the non-player party members. The player can switch between them at any time. Each of the three tribal races have distinct weapon types; the spear wielding Darkus, the hammer wielding Serkah and the dual blade wielding Lagora. Enemies have strengths and weaknesses towards them. As the player progresses, attacks and abilities are unlocked.

== Plot ==
Ever Oasis is set in the vast desert of Vistrahda, which was originally a lush land until a chaotic force known as Chaos ravaged it thousands of years ago. Chaos destroyed all the oases except two. The story focuses on Tethu (Note: The playable character's name is determined by the gender the player chooses; the name for the male is Tethu and the female Tethi. For readability, this article uses Tethu.) the younger sibling of Nour, who was the chief of one of the last remaining oases. When Nour's oasis was destroyed by the Black Dragon, a being consumed by Chaos, Nour wounded the dragon before being consumed by it, becoming Sheut. Before succumbing to the Chaos, Nour seals Tethu in a pod and saves them from harm. Tethu wakes up in front of a small oasis and meets Esna, the last Water Spirit. They make a pact to build another oasis together. Being confined to her spring, Esna communicates with Tethu through a desert beetle, Khepri.

As the oasis expands, Tethu begins to roam the desert looking for Drauk and Serkah settlements as well as Lagora's village and other such locations. Tethu is also in search of certain crystals called Lumites, which Esna uses to ward off Chaos. Upon gathering the third Lumite, Esna is manipulated by Sheut to turn on Tethu by corrupting its power and creating a Black Lumite. Being controlled by Thoth, the Great Sage, Tethu must journey to the Sanctuary of Light to reform the Lumites into a White Lumite capable of defeating Sheut and the Black Dragon. Equipped with the White Lumite, Tethu proceeds to battle Sheut in the Chaos Void located directly below the oasis and battle the Black Dragon. The Black Dragon is defeated by Tethu, but before it dies, it tries to destroy the oasis one last time, forcing Esna to sacrifice herself to purify Chaos and return the land to its former state.

== Development ==
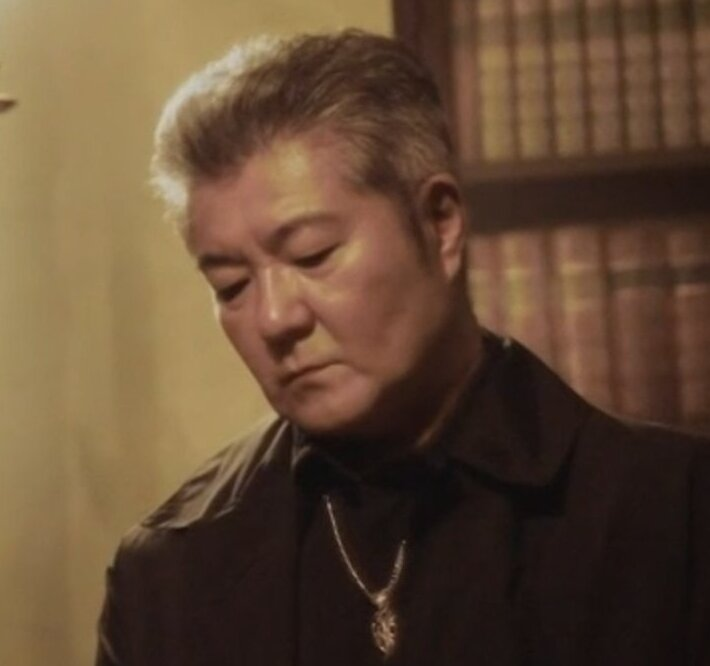
Director Koichi Ishii (pictured in 2024)

Director and producer Koichi Ishii was inspired to create Ever Oasis based on a trip to Egypt in the late 2000s. Originally conceived as a "compact, playable game", Ever Oasis eventually grew much bigger in scope. Ishii wanted to try something different from the formula of having players travel through many different areas on a quest to save the world, the central design goal became protecting and developing the oasis. He had the concept of a town-managing community but feared it would overlap with Animal Crossing, and so made an effort to differentiate the two. Ever Oasis was difficult to put together from both of its central mechanics, which were dungeon crawling and oasis management. Ishii reflected that even though the original concept of Ever Oasis had been designed logically, developing it proved difficult. Its combat system drew on Ishii's experience with action role-playing games. He described the fundamental concept to be similar in structure to that found in Final Fantasy XI, calling his choice of battle system a logical continuation of his career.

Concept art for Ever Oasis.

On the platform selection, Ishii noted that the team explicitly opted for the Nintendo 3DS over the Nintendo Switch, a system that had released earlier that year. The rationale behind this decision was that, at the time of development, "far more people have a 3DS than a Nintendo Switch" and also due to what the team considered to be a better immersion factor the 3DS could provide with its 3D effect.

Nintendo announced Ever Oasis during the second day of their E3 2016 Treehouse Live presentation. A trailer was shown, and mission gameplay was demonstrated; though it was not playable for convention attendees. A demo was made available at E3 2017. A demo was released on the Nintendo eShop. On July 14, 2018 Ever Oasis creator Koichi Ishii celebrated its first anniversary with art depicting Tethu, Tethi, and Esna.

== Reception ==
Reception

Aggregate score
Aggregator	Score
Metacritic	76/100

Review scores
Publication	Score
Computer Games Magazine	8.5/10
Destructoid	8.5/10
Electronic Gaming Monthly	4/5
Famitsu	9/10, 9/10, 8/10, 8/10
Game Informer	8/10
GameSpot	7/10
IGN	8.9/10
Jeuxvideo.com	13/20
Nintendo Life	9/10
Nintendo World Report	9/10
Polygon	5.5/10
RPGamer	3.5/5
RPGFan	80/100
USgamer	3.5/5

Ever Oasis was met with "generally positive" reviews according to Metacritic. Its town-building system, replayability and genre-blending elements were the most acclaimed aspects, while its slow beginning, inconsistent AI, and underdeveloped story were the most criticized.

The central gameplay loop, shuttling between managing the oasis and exploring dungeons, garnered acclaim. IGN reviewer Brendan Graeber felt the design made even necessary maintenance tasks feel worthwhile rather than chores. He concluded that Ever Oasis "managed to make me care as much about preserving my town as I do about saving the world". Morgan Sleeper of Nintendo Life found it "fresh and undeniably new", despite its developers' earlier influences, praising how the oasis and exploration parts connected into a harmonious whole. Destructoid 's CJ Andriessen commended its Legend of Zelda-inspired dungeon design and the way the two halves of its gameplay complemented each other, calling it a worthy release on the 3DS.

Game Informer reviewer Kyle Hilliard called Ever Oasis "a collection of familiar ideas pieced together in a unique way", but said no single element truly stood out from the rest. Kat Bailey of USgamer praised its polish and charming atmosphere but said it could have been among the best 3DS games if it had "aimed higher".

GameSpot's Matt Espineli said that while he enjoyed the incremental satisfaction of growing the oasis and appreciated the pace at which new gameplay mechanics were introduced, the narrative was shallow and combat frequently bogged down by the unreliable AI of his companions. The most negative review came from Allegra Frank of Polygon, who felt that Ever Oasis was too easy and its town-building too shallow, concluding that other games were better examples of the genres it combined.

The visual style and music were well received. Sleeper described its orchestral soundtrack as "bouncy and incorporating Middle Eastern influences with a cinematic quality that blended seamlessly into combat and exploration". Vice similarly found the score consistently compelling and praised its ability to shift tone appropriately from day to night. Famitsu published an average score of 34/40 in their review upon release in July 2017. In a year-end review of 2017's most memorable games, Tony Stephenson of Nintendo Life placed Ever Oasis as his most memorable game of 2017; calling it a "truly stunning game" and unappreciated. Sales wise, Ever Oasis struggled on debut; Its opening sales only scored 28th place, and as of July 16, 2017, has sold 15,907 copies.
