= Super Mario Party =

2018 video game

- Icon artwork
- Developer: NDcube (Note: Additional work by CAProduction)
- Publisher: Nintendo
- Director: Shuichiro Nishiya
- Producers: Toshiaki Suzuki; Toyokazu Nonaka; Keisuke Terasaki; Atsushi Ikeda; Kenji Kikuchi
- Designers: Tatsumitsu Watanabe; Takeru Sugimoto
- Programmers: Yuhei Tsukami; Yuya Kumagai
- Artists: Keisuke Kasahara; Takamitsu Manabe; Tomoaki Watanabe; Saori Yamashita
- Composers: Masayoshi Ishi; Toshiki Aida; Satoshi Okubo; Naruki Kadosaka
- Series: Mario Party
- Platform: Nintendo Switch
- Release: 5 October 2018
- Genre: Party
- Modes: Single-player, multiplayer

Super Mario Party (Note: Japanese: スーパー マリオパーティ, Hepburn: Sūpā Mario Pāti) is a 2018 party video game developed by NDcube and published by Nintendo for the Nintendo Switch. It is the eleventh main installment in the Mario Party series, and the first for the Nintendo Switch. The game was described as a "complete refresh" of the franchise, bringing back and revitalizing gameplay elements from older titles while also introducing new ones to go along with them. The game was released worldwide on 5 October 2018, and sold 1.5 million copies by the end of the month.

Super Mario Party includes four game boards and 80 minigames. It received positive reviews from critics. As of December 2025, the game has sold 21.28 million copies worldwide, making it the best-selling Mario Party game and one of the top 10 best-selling games on the system. Mario Party Superstars, a game featuring boards remastered from earlier entries and a return to the original formula, was released in 2021. A sequel, Super Mario Party Jamboree, was released on 17 October 2024.

== Gameplay ==
Mario about to roll his Mario Dice Block on the Whomp's Domino Ruins board, with Yoshi and Rosalina following him as allies. He can also switch Dice Blocks, use an item, or view the map to strategize.

Mario, Goomba, Peach, and Bowser competing in the Trike Harder minigame. The player must rotate the Joy-Con in a way similar to pedaling a bike.

Super Mario Party returns to the traditional turn-based Mario Party-style of gameplay for the first time in over a decade. This format had remained absent from home console entries since Mario Party 9. The game is played with one Joy-Con controller per player, with other players needing additional controllers for multiplayer. In the game's story, Mario and his friends hold a party to determine who should be the Super Star. Bowser appears, with Bowser Jr. and his minions, arguing that any of them could also be the Super Star. Toad, Toadette and Kamek (the latter at Bowser's behest) are appointed as judges and the party begins.

The standard game mode, "Mario Party", features up to four players taking turns independently navigating the game board. Upon the player's turn, a dice block is rolled to determine how many spaces the player moves on the board, and items collected can be used to alter how many spaces the player can move. Each space has a unique function, such as blue and red spaces giving and taking three coins respectively, and good luck and bad luck spaces granting the player helpful or unhelpful consequences.

After each player takes their turn, everyone competes in a minigame that awards coins based on their placement. Minigames vary with rules and playstyle, such as 4-player free-for-alls, 2-on-2 or 1-on-3 matchups, or utilizing motion controls or HD Rumble. There are 80 minigames in total across all game modes where the objects are colored according to Mario Party 7's color code, and they can all be played independently of the game board in the Free Play section.

One star is located in a random location at a time; any player who reaches it can spend ten coins to purchase it. The player who has the most stars and coins by the end of the game wins. Coins can additionally be spent on one-use items to give the player certain advantages on the board, such as adding to one's own dice roll, subtracting from another player's dice roll, or using a golden pipe to be taken directly to the star.

One major difference compared to previous home console entries is the introduction of character-specific dice blocks: each character has a unique alternative dice block that has a different selection of numbers compared to the standard dice block, including a slightly higher chance of 3's (Mario), rolling only even numbers (Peach), and having a decent chance for a high roll but an equally likely chance to lose coins (Bowser). Another major difference is the incorporation of the ally system from the Nintendo 3DS game Mario Party: Star Rush, wherein each player can recruit up to three allies from the roster. These allies can add additional rolls to the player's dice block, lend the player their character-specific dice block for the duration of the game, and appear as assistance in some of the minigames.

Beyond the standard Mario Party mode, Super Mario Party features several secondary game modes for multiplayer. The second, known as "Partner Party", has two teams of two players also searching for stars, but the players are free to move in any direction and cross their path, similar to the "Toad Scramble" mode from the aforementioned Star Rush. This mode features unique items and redesigned board layouts. In "River Survival", four players must work together to navigate through a series of white-water rapids under a time limit. This mode features exclusive minigames that focus on cooperation and reward the team with time bonuses. In "Sound Stage", players compete in a series of motion-controlled rhythm games in one of three difficulty settings, and the player with the highest score by the end wins.

The final multiplayer-focused game mode is "Toad's Rec Room", where players can take multiple Nintendo Switch consoles and arrange and synchronize them to create larger, multi-monitor environments. The minigames featured with this mode include an enhanced version of the "Shell Shocked" minigame from the Nintendo 64 entries, and a unique take on toy baseball. The last major game mode in Super Mario Party is "Challenge Road", essentially a single-player campaign wherein the player participates in every single minigame featured in the game, including those from River Survival and Sound Stage, now with unique challenges associated to them. This mode is unlocked when all of the minigames have been played at least once in their respective modes.

Beyond local play, Super Mario Party features online multiplayer for the first time in the Mario Party series. In the game's "Online Mariothon" mode, players are only able to play a selection of ten of the game's 80 minigames with other players online, independent of the board games. Here, players compete in five randomly selected minigames out of the aforementioned ten, aiming to get the highest combined score by the end. It also features leaderboards and a ranking system, as well as rewards that the player can receive for playing the mode. At launch, the two board game modes, Mario Party and Partner Party, were restricted to offline play. However, on 27 April 2021, Nintendo released patch update 1.1.0, which allows for full access to Mario Party, Partner Party, and Free Play for online multiplayer. This update also allows for the use of the Nintendo Switch's built-in invite feature. All of these modes can be played with people on one's friend list or in lobbies protected by a passcode, and 70 of the 80 total minigames can be played online, with the ten omitted minigames being from the Sound Stage mode.

Super Mario Party features a roster of twenty playable characters. The roster includes Mario, Luigi, Yoshi, Peach, Daisy, Rosalina, Wario, Waluigi, Donkey Kong, Diddy Kong, Koopa Troopa, Hammer Bro, Dry Bones, Shy Guy, Boo, Bowser, and Bowser Jr., all of whom are returning characters, with Bowser being fully playable for the first time. New playable characters to the series include Pom Pom, Goomba, and Monty Mole, none of whom have previously been a playable character in Mario Party; although this is the former's debut in the series, the latter two have appeared as NPCs throughout the series.

== Development ==
Super Mario Party was developed by NDcube, who have handled every Mario Party title since Mario Party 9 (2012). Nintendo revealed Super Mario Party on 12 June 2018, during their Nintendo Direct presentation for E3 2018, where they also announced that the game would release on 5 October 2018, exclusively for the Nintendo Switch. In August 2018, Nintendo stated that Super Mario Party would not support the Nintendo Switch Pro Controller. Later in September 2018, it was revealed that Super Mario Party would not support handheld mode, as the game only supports one Joy-Con per player.

== Reception ==
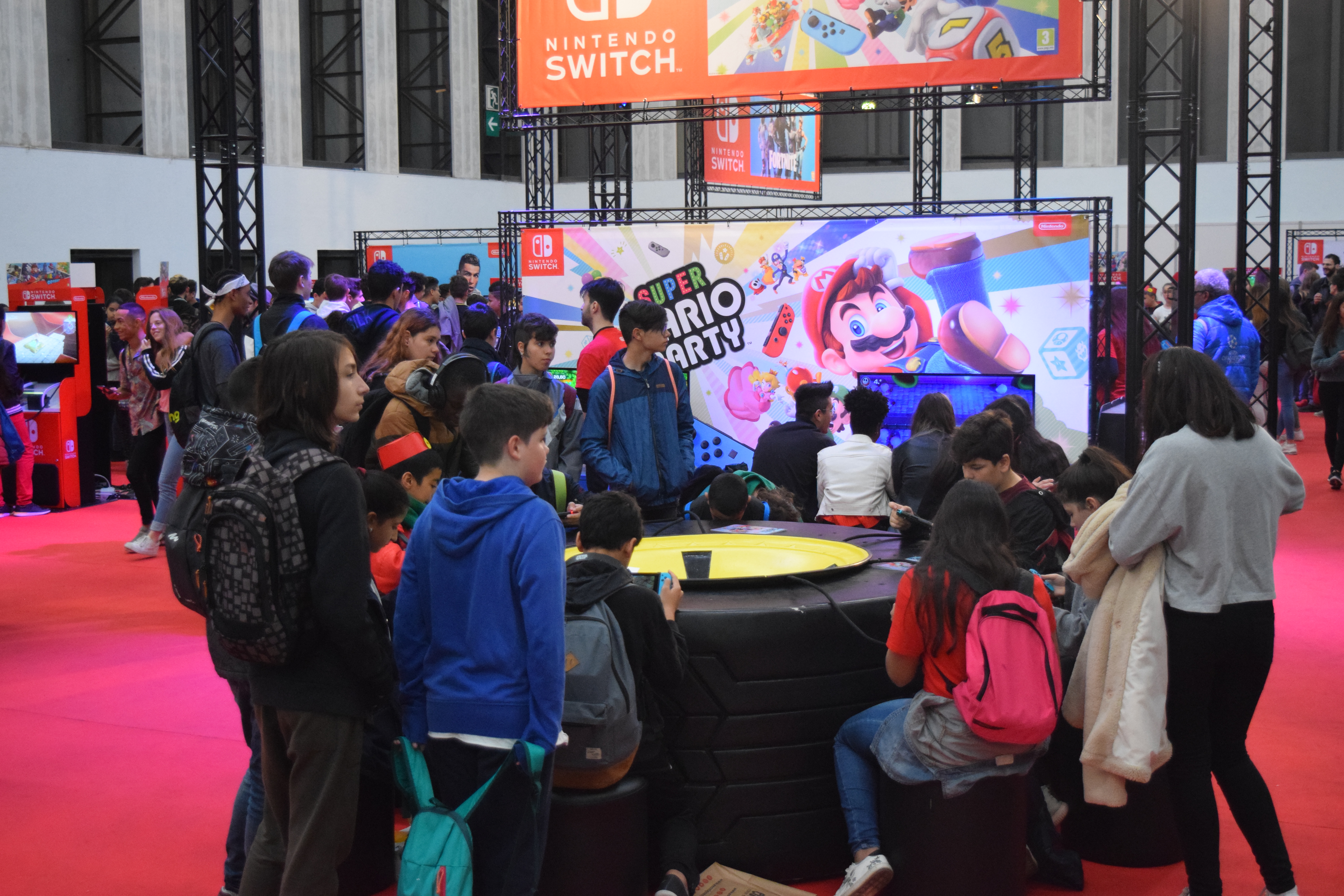
Playable demo booth for Super Mario Party in 2019

=== Critical response ===
Reception

Aggregate scores
Aggregator	Score
Metacritic	76/100
OpenCritic	60% recommend

Review scores
Publication	Score
Destructoid	7.5/10
Electronic Gaming Monthly	9/10
Famitsu	34/40
Game Informer	7.25/10
GameSpot	7/10
Hardcore Gamer	4/5
IGN	7.3/10
Nintendo Life	8/10
Nintendo World Report	8.5/10
USgamer	3/5
VentureBeat	82/100

Super Mario Party received "generally favorable reviews" according to review aggregator website Metacritic, becoming the highest-rated game in the series at the time since Mario Party 2. Fellow review aggregator OpenCritic assessed that the game received strong approval, being recommended by 60% of critics. In Japan, four critics from Famitsu gave the game a total score of 34 out of 40.

Samuel Claiborn of IGN claimed that "Super Mario Party is the best Party in two console generations," and that "it delivers the couch multiplayer experience the series is famous for". Jordan Ramée of GameSpot particularly praised the inclusion of character-specific dice blocks, stating they "added small moments of strategy into a series that has for too long solely relied on randomness". Evan Slead of Electronic Gaming Monthly, like Ramée, emphatically welcomed the removal of the car mechanic from the two previous home console entries, Mario Party 9 and Mario Party 10. Alex Olney of Nintendo Life, like Slead and Claiborn, not only welcomed the omission of the car but also commended the game's overall presentation. Olney particularly singled out the new hub world as a point of praise, noting that it added charm to the game even if it was not truly a necessary inclusion. While the game was praised for its wide variety of game modes and characters, some of the highest praise has gone to the minigames, with Game Informer's Brian Shea claiming that "the highlights shine bright enough that when the occasional dud pops up, I don't mind".

=== Sales ===
Super Mario Party sold 142,868 physical copies within its first two days in Japan, outpacing its two home console predecessors. Super Mario Party debuted at #5 on United Kingdom sales charts for physical copies sold, even during a very crowded release schedule. By 31 October 2018, total sales of Super Mario Party reached over 1.5 million copies, far exceeding Nintendo's expectations and making it the fastest-selling Mario Party game since Mario Party 6. As of March 2019, the game has sold 1.22 million copies in Japan. By 31 March 2025, the game has sold 21.16 million units.

=== Accolades ===
Year	Award	Category	Result	Ref.
2018	Gamescom Awards	Best Family Game	Won	
2018	The Game Awards 2018	Best Family Game	Nominated	
2018	Gamers' Choice Awards	Fan Favorite Family-Friendly Multiplayer Game	Won	
2018	Titanium Awards	Best Social/Family Game	Nominated	
2018	Australian Games Awards	Family/Kids Title of the Year	Nominated	
2018	Australian Games Awards	Game of the Year	Nominated	
2019	National Academy of Video Game Trade Reviewers Awards	Game, Franchise Family	Won	
2019	2019 Kids' Choice Awards	Favorite Video Game	Nominated	
2019	15th British Academy Games Awards	Family	Nominated	
2019	15th British Academy Games Awards	Multiplayer	Nominated	
2019	Italian Video Game Awards	People's Choice	Nominated	
2019	Italian Video Game Awards	Best Family Game	Nominated	

== See also ==
- List of Nintendo Switch games
- List of party video games
- List of video games featuring Mario
- 2018 in video games
