= The Legend of Zelda: Ocarina of Time 3D =

2011 video game

- North American and Australian packaging artwork
- Developer: Grezzo (Note: Additional support by Nintendo EAD Tokyo)
- Publisher: Nintendo
- Producers: Eiji Aonuma; Takao Shimizu; Koichi Ishii
- Designer: Hiroyuki Kuwata
- Programmer: Shun Moriya
- Artist: Mikiharu Ooiwa
- Composers: Koji Kondo; Mahito Yokota; Takeshi Hama
- Series: The Legend of Zelda
- Platform: Nintendo 3DS
- Release: JP/EU: June 16, 2011; NA: June 19, 2011; AU: June 30, 2011
- Genre: Action-adventure
- Mode: Single-player

The Legend of Zelda: Ocarina of Time 3D (Note: The Legend of Zelda: Ocarina of Time 3D (ゼルダの伝説 時のオカリナ 3D, Zeruda no Densetsu: Toki no Okarina 3D)) is a 2011 action-adventure game developed by Grezzo and published by Nintendo for the Nintendo 3DS handheld game console. A remake of the original 1998 Nintendo 64 game, it features updated graphics, quality of life changes, stereoscopic 3D effects, and mirrored versions of the rearranged dungeons from Ocarina of Time Master Quest. The game was released in June 2011, with a digital release via the Nintendo eShop which arrived in 2012.

Ocarina of Time 3D received critical acclaim, with some calling it one of the best video game remakes of all time. It was also a commercial success with over 6.44 million units sold worldwide as of December 2022, making it the thirteenth best-selling Nintendo 3DS game. It was followed by The Legend of Zelda: Majora's Mask 3D in 2015.

== Gameplay ==
Link swimming in the Water Temple dungeon. Several quality-of-life changes were made to the Water Temple to streamline progression and avoid confusion.

The gameplay for the remake is similar to the original version, with some modifications. One new feature is the use of the touchscreen to manage inventory items. Additionally, the touchscreen is used at times to play the Ocarina songs. The game uses the system's gyroscopic technology to look around and aim the player's bow, boomerang, hookshot, longshot, and slingshot in first-person mode, unless the player chooses analog controls to aim.

The 3DS version has the modified Master Quest dungeons and mirrored overworld in addition to the original game, and a new "Boss Challenge" mode that allows the player to fight all of the bosses one at a time, or in sequential order, while the Master Quest has its own version of the "Boss Challenge" mode, where the boss arenas are mirrored and enemies will do twice the usual amount of damage.

Another new addition is a set of brief videos called "Visions." These serve as hint videos to assist new players. They are accessed via Sheikah Stones, which are located at Link's house in the Kokiri Forest and inside the Temple of Time. Due to the 3DS having no equivalent to the Nintendo 64's Rumble Pak, the Stone of Agony from the original game was replaced with the Shard of Agony, which serves the same purpose, only with a sound signal to inform players of nearby secrets.

== Plot ==
The player controls the series' trademark hero, Link, in the land of Hyrule. Link sets out on a quest to stop Ganondorf, King of the Gerudo tribe, from obtaining the Triforce, a sacred relic that grants the wishes of its holder. Link travels back and forth through time and navigates various dungeons to awaken sages who have the power to seal Ganondorf away. Music plays an important role—to progress, the player must learn to play and perform several songs on an ocarina.

== Development ==
The existence of an Ocarina of Time "remake" for the Nintendo 3DS was first hinted at E3 2010, but at the time Shigeru Miyamoto maintained that it was merely a tech demo with the possibility of being developed into a full game. Nintendo of America officially announced its production on Twitter a few months later. Miyamoto commented that the game's timing was important, as they did not want to release the game too soon. He wanted to wait so that the people who played Ocarina of Time when they were younger were now in their mid-20s. He also wanted players to experience the "majestic scenery of Hyrule in stereoscopic 3D" and provide a sense of immersion. Ocarina of Time 3D runs at 30 frames per second, which is an increase over the Nintendo 64 version's 20 frames per second. Areas, such as the Market, that previously made use of pre-rendered backgrounds, are now rendered in real-time polygonal 3D like the rest of the environments.

Ocarina of Time 3D was co-developed with Japanese developer Grezzo. According to Grezzo's Shun Moriya, some of the original game's bugs were intentionally untouched in the 3DS version, because they were so committed to deliver Ocarina of Time on 3DS in just the way the fans remembered: "As programmers, we wanted to get rid of bugs, but the staff members who had played the old game said the bugs were fun. It wouldn't be fun if your friends couldn't say, 'Do you know about this?' So we left them in if they didn't cause any trouble and were beneficial. If something simply could not be allowed to stand, we begrudgingly fixed it, so some bugs don't appear. But we left in as many as we could, so people will grin over that". Eiji Aonuma, producer of the original game, said that a desire to make Ocarina of Time 3D more "formidable" was behind the decision to include and adjust the Master Quest campaign.

=== Marketing and release ===
In Australia, anyone who pre-ordered the game from EB Games Australia could receive the Ocarina Edition, which included a playable ocarina that sports the Triforce symbol, two music sheets featuring songs from the game, and a poster. In Greece, anyone who pre-ordered the game from Nintendo's online store could receive five bonus items. The items were an ocarina, a baseball hat, a keychain, a sleeve for the 3DS, and a can of Deku Tree seeds. In the UK, anyone who pre-ordered the game would get a free game case with a North American collectors' cover and a double-sided poster. Anyone who pre-ordered the game from Play.com got a bonus slip case for the 3DS console featuring the same artwork as the U.K. game box. In Japan, the U.S., the U.K., Australia and New Zealand, anyone who registered the game through Nintendo's Club Nintendo service received a free copy of the game's official soundtrack.

In June 2011, actor and comedian Robin Williams starred in a commercial to promote the game along with his daughter Zelda Williams, whom he had named after the character from the series. In Japan, boy band Arashi advertised the game in television and print spots. Nintendo ran TV advertisements around the release of Ocarina of Time 3D, showcasing its new features. Online takeovers appeared on websites during release week, while a print campaign ran in specialist magazines. Advertisements ran again throughout the summer season.

The retail cartridge of Ocarina of Time 3D was discontinued in early 2015, temporarily leading to high prices on the secondary market, until March 2016, when Ocarina of Time 3D was re-released under the Nintendo Selects label.

=== Music ===
The music in Ocarina of Time 3D was adapted from the original for the 3DS hardware by Mahito Yokota and Takeshi Hama, with Koji Kondo supervising them. To coincide with the release of the game as well as the 25th anniversary of the release of The Legend of Zelda, Nintendo freely released, via mail out redemption, an updated CD version of the original soundtrack through the Club Nintendo website.

The 3DS version of the soundtrack contained 51 tracks, including all the original tracks from the U.S. version of the soundtrack, as well as several more tracks from the Japanese edition, and a bonus orchestral medley. Although it was available in all regions, the soundtrack was only available to owners of the 3DS version that registered their copy on Club Nintendo and was only available for a limited time.

== Reception ==
Reception

Aggregate scores
Aggregator	Score
GameRankings	93.89%
Metacritic	94/100

Review scores
Publication	Score
1Up.com	B+
AllGame	4.5/5
Computer and Video Games	9.4/10
Electronic Gaming Monthly	9.5/10
Eurogamer	10/10
Famitsu	37/40
Game Informer	9.25/10
GameSpot	8.5/10
GamesRadar+	9/10
GameTrailers	9.2/10
Giant Bomb	5/5
IGN	9.5/10
Joystiq	4.5/5
Nintendo Life	10/10
Nintendo Power	9.5/10
Nintendo World Report	9.5/10
Official Nintendo Magazine	98%
PALGN	9.5/10
Play	97/100
Pocket Gamer	10/10
The Guardian	5/5
VideoGamer.com	10/10
X-Play	5/5
Digital Spy	5/5
Gamereactor	10/10

The Legend of Zelda: Ocarina of Time 3D received critical acclaim. As a remake of a Nintendo 64 game widely considered the greatest game of all time, expectations were high for the new version. Reviewers praised the mirrored version of the rearranged dungeons from the Master Quest version of the original game, along with the updated graphics, visuals, controls, the new "Boss Challenge" mode and the added 3D effects. The game was available to the public at Nintendo's Nintendo World 2011 event; the title attracted significant amounts of attention, with longer wait times to play than any other featured title. Ocarina of Time 3D went on to receive perfect scores from at least 24 different publications.

Nintendo Power gave it a rating of 9.5 out of 10, stating that the core gameplay held up impressively well, and that it never feels like a lesser game than what players have become accustomed to, but rather, it has a back-to-basics feel. Game Informer rated the game 9.25 stating that "with Ocarina of Time 3D, one of the greatest games of all time looks and plays better than ever". They further stated that this was the perfect way to introduce it to a new generation of gamers. Eurogamer was very pleased with the title by awarding it with a perfect score, calling it one of the greatest games on 3DS. Official Nintendo Magazine scored the game 98%, the highest they have ever given, calling it "a life-changing game, an experience that defines the medium it inhabits and if you have the chance to experience it afresh, it will be even better". Electronic Gaming Monthly gave it 9.5 and stated the game is "still a transformative action-adventure after 13 years" and that "Ocarina of Time 3D is still a just as good as the original, though, and it's a must-play for any gamer who's somehow missed it up until now". Nintendo Life gave the game a perfect 10/10 score, noting it to be "close to gaming perfection, a classic that has been refined and polished with great care".

Computer and Video Games gave the game 9.4 and wrote that it is "still a classic, still an explosion of nostalgia. Ocarina of Time 3D is a blissful rediscovery for veterans and an unmissable opportunity for newcomers". Retro Gamer gave it a 98%, calling it a perfect example how to remake a video game classic. VideoGamer gave it a perfect score: "We knew then that Miyamoto and co had made a classic, but it's only now that we can see just how revolutionary Ocarina of Time actually was". Giant Bomb also gave it a perfect score, and going so far to say that "it's almost as important as a historical record as it is a game that's still enjoyable today".

CNN.com said that "this would be a great game for any gamer of any age". GameSpot gave the game 8.5, stating: "Though its roots show through from time to time, the improved visuals remove any barrier of entry that age may have posed. The new elements enhance the core adventure to create the definitive version of this classic game, making Ocarina of Time 3D the best way to embark on (or relive) this landmark adventure". 1UP was slightly more critical of the game, which gave the game B+: "As a portable gaming enthusiast, I love being able to play a game of this quality on the go. I just wish as much attention had been paid to the nuts-and-bolts of the game as was lavished on appearance".

=== Sales ===
In Japan, Ocarina of Time 3D helped the 3DS to take the top spot on the hardware chart after 12 weeks. Ocarina of Time 3D debuted at No. 2 with 164,110 units sold in its first week in Japan. Media-Create said this amounts to 90.02% of all copies of the game that were sent out to retail shops for selling. It was rumored that stock in Zelda was a bit low in Japan for the reporting period.

In the UK, Ocarina of Time 3D debuted second on the charts in the country during its debut week. In North America, Ocarina of Time 3D led cross-platform sales upon its debut week and debuted first on the multiplatform chart.

One million units had been sold worldwide by the end of June 2011, making it the third 3DS title to do so. 270,000 of those sales came from Japan. By August 2014, 1.39 million copies had been sold in the United States. As of December 2022, 6.44 million copies have been sold worldwide.
