= Buta no shippo =

Japanese card game

Buta no shippo (豚のしっぽ) is a Japanese card game. It literally means pig's tail in English. The game is usually played with three or more players. It can be considered a party game. This game makes an appearance in Clubhouse Games: 51 Worldwide Classics under the name "Pig's Tail".

== Basic rules ==
In Japan, there are several varieties of "pig tail" card games played in a circle and this is just how to play one of those.

1. On a table or on the floor, make a large circle with face down cards. This ring is what is referred to as the "pig's tail". Every player places their hand on the outside of the circle and gets ready.
2. Players do janken, a Japanese version of rock, scissors, paper, to decide who plays in what order. In that order, each player takes a card from the pig's "tail" and quickly flips it up and places it inside the circle. Then the player puts their hand back outside the circle.
3. Next, when a player flips over an attack card (such as a joker, or the same suit as the last card flipped over, the same number as the last, etc.) each player quickly takes their hand from the outside of the circle and piles it up on the flipped over card's inside the ring of cards. This is called "attack".
4. Of all the players, the player with the hand on the top (that is, the slowest player) has to take all the cards that have been flipped over until the attack happened. If a player tries to attack on the wrong card and touches the flipped over cards, that player must take all the currently flipped over cards. The loser is based on the number of cards held at the end of the game.
5. As the cards are taken from the "tail" the circle should get smaller.

== See also ==
- Other Japanese card games
