= The Legend of Zelda: Majora's Mask 3D =

2015 video game

- North American box art
- Developer: Grezzo
- Publisher: Nintendo
- Director: Mikiharu Ooiwa
- Producers: Eiji Aonuma; Koichi Ishii
- Programmer: Shingo Watanabe
- Artist: Tatsuya Awata
- Composer: Koji Kondo
- Series: The Legend of Zelda
- Platform: Nintendo 3DS
- Release: NA/EU: February 13, 2015; JP/AU: February 14, 2015
- Genre: Action-adventure
- Mode: Single-player

The Legend of Zelda: Majora's Mask 3D (Note: ゼルダの伝説 ムジュラの仮面 3D (Zeruda no Densetsu: Mujura no Kamen 3D) in Japanese) is a 2015 action-adventure game developed by Grezzo and published by Nintendo for the Nintendo 3DS handheld game console. The game is a remake of The Legend of Zelda: Majora's Mask, which was originally released for the Nintendo 64 home console in 2000. The game was released worldwide in February 2015, coinciding with the North American and European releases of the New Nintendo 3DS, to positive reviews, with particular praise for its fast-paced gameplay, enhanced graphics, and quality of life changes.

== Gameplay ==
Like the original Nintendo 64 version, the game follows Link, who is given only three days to save the land of Termina from being obliterated by the moon, using various abilities obtained by wearing different masks and the Ocarina of Time to reset the three-day cycle. Much like its predecessor, The Legend of Zelda: Ocarina of Time 3D, Majora's Mask 3D is an enhanced remake of the original Majora's Mask, now featuring enhanced stereoscopic 3D graphics, revamped environmental textures, an increase in the frame rate to 30 frames-per-second, a new touchscreen-based user interface, and gyroscopic aiming. If played on a New Nintendo 3DS system or with the Circle Pad Pro accessory, the second analog stick can be used for complete 360-degree camera control.

Unlike its predecessor, there were many large and small-scale changes made in the transition to the Nintendo 3DS. Among the major changes and enhancements was the Song of Double Time, which now allows the player to skip ahead to any hour of the given day as opposed to only six-hour intervals. The Bombers' Notebook was made far more comprehensive, now keeping track of virtually every character involved in any kind of quest as opposed to the more vague hints in the original. The controls for each of Link's three major mask transformations, Deku, Goron, and Zora, have all been changed to some degree in the remake. For instance, Deku Link now needs a running start before he can hop across bodies of water, Goron Link's animations for attacking and uncurling from a ball have been sped up, and Zora Link now costs magic to swim and swims slower, but is easier to control. The save system has also been completely revamped; before, the game could only be saved by creating a temporary suspend point or creating a permanent save by restarting the three-day cycle. Now, the player can permanently save by checking in at any of the Owl Statues or Save Statues that inhabit the game world; this replaces both saving methods from the original. The Sheikah Stone hint system from Ocarina of Time 3D returns as well, offering hint videos for players who get stuck at a certain point. Finally, a brand new fishing minigame was added that was not in the original.

== Plot ==
The game stars Link from The Legend of Zelda: Ocarina of Time 3D and takes place several months after the conclusion of that game. The game begins with Link riding his faithful horse Epona deep into the woods, in search of his lost friend Navi. After chasing a masked Skull Kid who stole his Ocarina, Link finds himself trapped in the parallel world of Termina, where he discovers that the moon will crash into the surface in three days' time and destroy the world. With the aid of his new fairy friend Tatl, Link must travel across Termina, wake the sleeping Four Giants to stop the moon's descent, and defeat Skull Kid and the mask possessing him. To do this, Link must acquire a series of strange masks to grant himself new abilities and aid the people of Termina, as well as using his ocarina to alter and travel through time and repeat the three-day cycle.

== Development ==
The Legend of Zelda series producer Eiji Aonuma and co-developers Grezzo had started the development of Majora's Mask 3D immediately after the release of Ocarina of Time 3D in June 2011, after being suggested to do so by Shigeru Miyamoto. The project itself, however, was put under wraps for the greater part of its development, with Aonuma and others involved with its development neither confirming nor denying the existence of the game, but rather, suggesting that a Majora's Mask remake was "not an impossibility", depending on interest and demand. During development, Aonuma played through the original version of Majora's Mask, this time while keeping a list of things which would be adjusted in the remake. This became colloquially known as the "what in the world" list, composed of moments that stuck out to him as unreasonable and alienating for players. After the first draft, the list was passed on to the team at Grezzo, who would regularly update the list with moments from their own experiences with the Nintendo 64 version. He believes the remake feels more forgiving than the original as a result. Because Aonuma was also working on A Link Between Worlds at the same time as Majora's Mask 3D, he took ideas and themes from that game and incorporated them into the remake, though did not name which ones in particular. Additionally because production took such a long time, with a continuously growing checklist of gameplay updates and revisions, Grezzo was instructed to include support for New Nintendo 3DS models in the latter half of development, such as camera control with the C-Stick.

=== Operation Moonfall ===
Following the release of Ocarina of Time 3D, a fan campaign called "Operation Moonfall" was launched to prompt Nintendo and Grezzo to remake Majora's Mask for the 3DS in the same vein. The campaign name is a reference to a similar fan-based movement, Operation Rainfall, set up to persuade Nintendo of America to release a trio of role-playing video games for the Wii. In response to the feedback, Nintendo of America revealed that they had no official announcements of Majora's Mask remake, but they were interested to hear about what fans wanted, acknowledging their campaign. Both Zelda producer Eiji Aonuma and Miyamoto expressed interest in developing the remake in the future.

== Release ==
During the Nintendo Direct presentation held in November 2014, The Legend of Zelda: Majora's Mask 3D was announced for the Nintendo 3DS. The game was ultimately released worldwide in February 2015 alongside the New Nintendo 3DS XL.

A special edition featuring a pin badge, double-sided poster, and steelbook was released in Europe and Australia. The pin badge was also released on North America. Another special edition was available in North America, which includes the game and a Skull Kid figurine. This figurine was also bundled with UK pre-orders for the game and a New 3DS/New 3DS XL from Nintendo's online store.

== Reception ==
Reception

Aggregate scores
Aggregator	Score
Metacritic	89/100
OpenCritic	96% recommend

Review scores
Publication	Score
Destructoid	8/10
Game Informer	9.25/10
GameRevolution	4.5/5
GameSpot	9/10
GamesRadar+	4.5/5
GameTrailers	8.5/10
IGN	8.7/10
Nintendo Life	10/10
Nintendo World Report	8.5/10
Polygon	9/10
Hardcore Gamer	4.5/5

Majora's Mask 3D received "generally positive reviews", according to review aggregator Metacritic. Fellow review aggregator OpenCritic assessed that the game received "mighty" approval, being recommended by 96% of critics. Game Informer complimented the changes, but they were still frustrated by the repetition caused by the time management restrictions. Polygon praised many changes and improvements, particularly the game's journal, visuals, and bosses, noting that the remake refines the original game's structure in many ways without compromising the premise. IGN praised the game design, but criticized parts of the original game that don't work as well in the remake.

=== Sales ===
By the end of February 2015, its release month, 515,000 physical and digital copies were sold in the United States. By the end of March, 730,000 copies had been sold. After five weeks of availability in Japan, over 390,000 copies had been sold. As of December 2022, the game has sold 3.44 million copies worldwide, surpassing the original in sales.
