= Grezzo =

Japanese video game developer

Grezzo 株式会社グレッゾ
- Industry: Video games
- Founded: December 2006; 19 years ago
- Headquarters: Shibuya, Tokyo, Japan
- Key people: Koichi Ishii (CEO/president)
- Number of employees: 111 (2026)
- Website: www.grezzo.co.jp/en/

Grezzo Co., Ltd. (Japanese: 株式会社グレッゾ, Hepburn: Kabushiki Gaisha Gurezzo; stylized as GREZZO) is a Japanese video game developer. Founded in December 2006, it is best known for developing installments in Nintendo's The Legend of Zelda series. Koichi Ishii, known for his work on the Mana series of games by Square Enix, is CEO and president. The company's name comes from the Italian expression "diamante grezzo", meaning 'a diamond in the rough'.

== History ==
Grezzo was founded by Koichi Ishii in December 2006, with Ishii as CEO. The company's first original release was the Japanese exclusive Line Attack Heroes WiiWare game that released in 2010. Soon after, Ishii was approached by Satoru Iwata of Nintendo to begin work on a game for the still in development Nintendo 3DS. From this partnership, Grezzo started work on The Legend of Zelda series. In 2011, it was revealed that the studio would be developing Nintendo's The Legend of Zelda: Ocarina of Time 3D for the Nintendo 3DS. In the same year, it also released a DSiWare version of Four Swords that allowed for singleplayer gameplay. Grezzo additionally handled Majora's Mask 3D and Tri Force Heroes in 2015.

During this time, Grezzo also worked on several RPG titles, partnering with Cattle Call for The Legend of Legacy and The Alliance Alive. At E3 2016, the company announced Ever Oasis, a new original game directed by Ishii. The game was published by Nintendo and released on the 3DS in 2017. Grezzo worked with Nintendo again to port Luigi's Mansion to the 3DS in 2018. It then released a remake of Link's Awakening for the Nintendo Switch in 2019.

In September 2024, it was revealed that Grezzo was the developer on The Legend of Zelda: Echoes of Wisdom. Following the release of Link's Awakening, Nintendo approached the studio about making an original game in the series. This new game was initially conceived as a dungeon editor before transitioning to focus on the copy abilities that would make up the core of Echoes of Wisdom.

== Games ==
List of games developed by Grezzo
Year	Game	Publisher	Platform(s)	Notes	Ref.
2002	Final Fantasy XI	Square	PlayStation 2, Microsoft Windows, Xbox 360	Co-development of expansions with Square.	
2010	Line Attack Heroes	Nintendo	Wii		
2011	The Legend of Zelda: Ocarina of Time 3D	Nintendo	Nintendo 3DS	Enhanced port of Nintendo 64 game	
2011	The Legend of Zelda: Four Swords Anniversary Edition	Nintendo	Nintendo DSi	Enhanced port or remake of Game Boy Advance game	
2013	StreetPass Garden	Nintendo	Nintendo 3DS	Titled Flower Town in North America	
2015	The Legend of Legacy	FuRyu	Nintendo 3DS	Co-developed with Cattle Call.	
2015	The Legend of Zelda: Majora's Mask 3D	Nintendo	Nintendo 3DS	Enhanced port of Nintendo 64 game	
2015	The Legend of Zelda: Tri Force Heroes	Nintendo	Nintendo 3DS	Co-developed with Nintendo Entertainment Planning & Development.	
2017	The Alliance Alive	FuRyu	Nintendo 3DS	Co-developed with Cattle Call.	
2017	Ever Oasis	Nintendo	Nintendo 3DS		
2018	Luigi's Mansion	Nintendo	Nintendo 3DS	Enhanced port of GameCube game	
2019	The Legend of Zelda: Link's Awakening	Nintendo	Nintendo Switch	Remake of Game Boy game	
2021	Miitopia	Nintendo	Nintendo Switch		
2023	Jet Dragon	Grezzo	iOS, macOS, tvOS		
2024	The Legend of Zelda: Echoes of Wisdom	Nintendo	Nintendo Switch	Co-developed with Nintendo Entertainment Planning & Development.	
