= Nintendo Cube =

Video game developer

Nintendo Cube Co., Ltd.
- Logo since September 2024
- Native name: ニンテンドーキューブ株式会社
- Romanized name: Kabushiki gaisha Nintendōkyūbu
- Formerly: Nd Cube (2000–2012); NDcube (2012–2024)
- Type: Subsidiary
- Industry: Video games
- Founded: March 1, 2000; 26 years ago in Tokyo, Japan
- Founder: Hidetoshi Endo
- Headquarters: AgriSquare 12F, Shibuya, Tokyo, Japan
- Number of locations: 2 studios (Note: Sapporo Head Office and Tokyo Head Office) (2020)
- Key people: President & CEO; Shūichirō Nishiya; Executive Vice President; Kenji Kikuchi; Directors; Kazuhiko Nonaka; Hideki Sahashi; Toyokazu Nonaka (Nintendo); Auditor & Supervisory Board Member; Keisuke Kondo (Nintendo); Former President & Chairman; Hidetoshi Endo
- Products: Games
- Brands: Mario Party series; Wii series
- Number of employees: 134 (2026)
- Parent: Nintendo (Note: 2000–2010: 78% 2010–2015: 96% 2015–2023: 97% 2023–present: 99%)
- Website: nintendo-cube.co.jp

Nintendo Cube Co., Ltd., (Note: Japanese: ニンテンドーキューブ株式会社, Hepburn: NintendōKyūbu Kabushiki Gaisha) formerly known as Nd Cube and later NDcube, is a Japanese video game developer and subsidiary of Nintendo, headquartered in Shibuya, Tokyo, with an additional office in Sapporo. They are best known as the developers of the Mario Party series since Mario Party 9, when they took over the series from the original developer Hudson Soft.

== History ==
The company was founded on March 1, 2000, as Nd Cube, as a joint venture between Nintendo and the biggest advertising firm in Japan called Dentsu, hence the "ND" (Nintendo-Dentsu) in the (original) name. Nintendo had 78% of the shares of the company at the time, while 13.3% of the shares were owned by Dentsu and the rest of the 8.7% were owned by other shareholders.

In the years after Mario Party 8's 2007 release, many employees from Hudson Soft migrated to Nd Cube, including former Hudson Soft president Hidetoshi Endo, who became president of Nd Cube around 2009.

In 2010, Nintendo decided to buy out the company's shares from Dentsu and the other shareholders, being then the major shareholder on the company, with its changing from 78% to 96% initially, to 97% in 2015, and since 2023, to 99% of the shares.

In 2012, Nd Cube rebranded to NDcube. In the same year, the company released Mario Party 9 for the Wii—the company's first Mario Party game.

In 2019, the director of the Mario Party series from Mario Party 6 to Super Mario Party, Shuichiro Nishiya, replaced Hidetoshi Endo as the company's president. Endo had served as president of NDcube for almost ten years.

In 2024, NDcube rebranded to Nintendo Cube.

== Games ==
List of video games developed by Nintendo Cube
Year	Title	Platform(s)
2001	F-Zero: Maximum Velocity	Game Boy Advance
2001	EZ-Talk Shokyuuhen series	Game Boy Advance
2001	Dokodemo Taikyoku Yakuman Advance	Game Boy Advance
2002	Card Party	Game Boy Advance
2002	Pool Edge	GameCube
2003	Tube Slider	GameCube
2010	Wii Party	Wii
2011	Wii Play: Motion	Wii
2012	Mario Party 9	Wii
2013	Wii Party U	Wii U
2013	Mario Party: Island Tour	Nintendo 3DS
2015	Mario Party 10	Wii U
2015	Animal Crossing: Amiibo Festival (Note: Co-developed with Nintendo EPD)	Wii U
2016	Mario Party: Star Rush	Nintendo 3DS
2017	Mario Party: The Top 100	Nintendo 3DS
2017	Animal Crossing: Pocket Camp	Android, iOS
2018	Super Mario Party	Nintendo Switch
2020	Clubhouse Games: 51 Worldwide Classics	Nintendo Switch
2021	Mario Party Superstars	Nintendo Switch
2023	Everybody 1-2-Switch!	Nintendo Switch
2024	Super Mario Party Jamboree	Nintendo Switch
2024	Animal Crossing: Pocket Camp Complete	Android, iOS
2025	Nintendo Switch 2 Welcome Tour	Nintendo Switch 2
2025	Super Mario Party Jamboree – Nintendo Switch 2 Edition + Jamboree TV	Nintendo Switch 2
