= Super Mario Party Jamboree =

2024 video game

- Developer: Nintendo Cube (Note: Additional work by CAProduction)
- Publisher: Nintendo
- Directors: Takeru Sugimoto; Osamu Tsuchihashi (JTV)
- Producers: Toshiaki Suzuki; Shinya Saito; Kenji Kikuchi; Hiroyuki Tsuboguchi (JTV)
- Programmers: Masayuki Shinohara; Yuuki Konno (JTV)
- Artists: Arata Kobayashi; Tomoaki Sakaguchi (JTV)
- Composers: Shigenobu Okawa; Yuta Yamaguchi
- Series: Mario Party
- Platforms: Nintendo Switch; Nintendo Switch 2
- Release: Nintendo Switch: October 17, 2024; Nintendo Switch 2: July 24, 2025
- Genre: Party
- Modes: Single-player, multiplayer

Super Mario Party Jamboree (Note: Japanese: スーパー マリオパーティ ジャンボリー, Hepburn: Sūpā Mario Pāti Janborī) is a 2024 party video game developed by Nintendo Cube and published by Nintendo for the Nintendo Switch. It is the thirteenth home console installment in the Mario Party series, and the third on Nintendo Switch, following Super Mario Party (2018) and Mario Party Superstars (2021).

Like most installments in the Mario Party series, the main gameplay loop features players, either human or computer-controlled, using characters from the Mario franchise to compete in a board game with minigames after each turn. The game features a single-player mission mode as well as several other game modes, some of which require the use of motion controls. Typically, up to four human players can compete at a time, but depending on the game mode, up to twenty human players can compete via online matchmaking.

Super Mario Party Jamboree received positive reviews, with general praise for its game board selection, multiplayer functionality, and general polish, but criticism for some of its game modes. Some have considered it to be one of the best Mario Party games to date. An upgraded port for the Nintendo Switch 2, Super Mario Party Jamboree – Nintendo Switch 2 Edition + Jamboree TV, featuring new modes and minigames, was released on July 24, 2025; it received mixed reactions for its online mode, removal of certain features, and lack of visual upgrades.

== Gameplay ==
(Clockwise from top left) A Jamboree Buddy minigame themed after Donkey Kong; Mario and Luigi flying Princess Peach to a set destination in "Paratroopa Flight School"; a group of characters firing at Imposter Bowser in "Bowser Kaboom Squad"; Yoshi playing a minigame in order to progress in "Koopathalon"

Super Mario Party Jamboree's gameplay is split between numerous different game modes, most of which require the usage of Joy-Con controllers and all of which can be accessed in the game's hub area called the "Party Plaza". In the hub, the player can access their game data and settings, listen to the game's selection of music, customize different aspects of the hub, and change their player character. The game boasts 22 playable characters (Mario, Luigi, Peach, Daisy, Wario, Waluigi, Yoshi, Toadette, Toad, Rosalina, Donkey Kong, Birdo, Bowser, Goomba, Shy Guy, Koopa Troopa, Monty Mole, Bowser Jr., Boo, Spike, and newcomers Pauline and Ninji) which makes for the current largest roster of playable characters in the Mario Party series. These characters can be controlled by human players as well as artificial intelligence (AI).

Much like other games in the Mario Party series, Super Mario Party Jamboree's main mode, dubbed simply "Mario Party", is an interactive board game that allows up to four players, human or computer-controlled, to compete to collect the most stars by the end of a set number of turns (ten through thirty), with different items and board mechanics that either help or harm the player's chances of success. After each turn has ended, the players play a minigame. A majority of minigames use motion controls, though it is possible to turn off the motion-controlled minigames to allow for minigames only using button controls. The board mechanic of allies from Super Mario Party makes a revamped return in the form of "Jamboree Buddies". Modeled after ten of the available player characters, Jamboree Buddies appear on the board after a certain amount of turns and, when passed, will trigger a minigame to see which player will obtain them. Jamboree Buddies last for up to three turns, activate a board space effect twice, and grant players different abilities that vary depending on the one obtained, such as Waluigi, who steals coins from opponents that he passes. Alongside the traditional set of rules, a more competitive ruleset called "Pro Rules" is available to select which is designed to remove most luck-based aspects found in traditional play.

Super Mario Party Jamboree contains a single-player mission mode called the "Party Planner Trek", in which players help various non-player characters by either talking to them, fetching an item, or playing a minigame in exchange for Mini-Stars which are then used to further progress in the mode and unlock hub customization options. After collecting a certain number of Mini-Stars in an area, the player must complete a boss minigame in order to progress to the next area. In Boss Minigames, the player's goal is to deplete a large enemy's health bar in a similar style to traditional video game boss fights. In the "Minigame Bay" mode, players can freely play any of the minigames or play a set number of minigames that are pre-selected based on their specific type or theme, such as 1 vs 3. A Boss Rush sub-mode, which is unlocked after earning thirty in-game achievements, makes players compete in every boss minigame with the final goal of having the highest score by the end.

Three motion-controlled modes are present and require the usage of singular Joy-Con controllers to function. "Rhythm Kitchen" lets players work together in rhythm-based minigames themed around cooking. "Toad's Item Factory" is a ball physics-based puzzler that tasks players to work together in moving different contraptions to get a ball to a goal to create thirty items. "Paratroopa Flight School" requires players to use two singular Joy-Con controllers in order to mimic flapping wings and flight. Paratroopa Flight School has three sub-modes that allow players to compete in time-based collection matches, cooperate in carrying characters to destinations, or freely fly around a map without any predetermined objective.

Two multiplayer-focused modes are present. "Bowser Kaboom Squad" is a cooperative mode where eight players race to defeat Impostor Bowser by collecting bombs, occasionally playing a minigame to obtain items that help the players defeat him more quickly. "Koopathlon" is a race where twenty different players compete to complete a set number of laps around a board via collecting coins in minigames. After three minigames, a themed Bowser minigame will be played where if a player loses, they will be sent backward a different number of spaces, the number of spaces being determined on their current position.

The game supports both local and online multiplayer, with most modes being able to support the former or the latter in some capacity. Players can set up private online lobbies protected by a passcode in order to play with friends. The game also contains an online leaderboard where minigame high scores are logged.

== Development ==
Super Mario Party Jamboree was first announced on June 18, 2024, during a Nintendo Direct; it was the first game to be released by Nintendo Cube after their rebranding from NDcube. Described to be "the biggest Mario Party to date", the presentation announced 112 minigames, seven boards (including Mario's Rainbow Castle and Western Land, which previously appeared in Mario Party and Mario Party 2, respectively), and 37 items. Also announced during the presentation was the online 20-player "Koopathlon" mode. An overview trailer, released on September 24, 2024, showed off all the motion-based modes (Paratroopa Flight School, Toad's Item Factory, and Rhythm Kitchen) and the online eight-player "Bowser Kaboom Squad" mode. The game was released for the Nintendo Switch on October 17, 2024.

This is the first time that Kevin Afghani voices Waluigi, as Charles Martinet had stepped down from voicing the character, along with Mario, Luigi and Wario.

=== Nintendo Switch 2 Edition ===
On April 2, 2025, during a Nintendo Direct, Super Mario Party Jamboree was announced to have an upgraded port on the Nintendo Switch 2. The port was announced to include enhanced graphics, frame rate and new modes that utilize mouse controls, full-body movement recognition through a connected external camera and the microphone built into the console itself. However, only the camera functionality was added to the base game, with the rest of the additions being included only in the Jamboree TV side mode. It was released on July 24, 2025.

== Reception ==
Reception

Aggregate scores
Aggregator	Score	
Aggregator	NS	NS2
Metacritic	82/100 (Note: Score based on 93 reviews)	76/100 (Note: Score based on 65 reviews)
OpenCritic	87% recommend (Note: Based on 106 reviews)	70% recommend (Note: Based on 62 reviews)

Review scores
Publication	Score	
Publication	NS	NS2
Destructoid	8/10	8/10
Digital Trends	3.5/5	3/5
Eurogamer	2/5	N/A
Famitsu	36/40	N/A
Game Informer	N/A	7/10
GameSpot	6/10	N/A
Hardcore Gamer	3.5/5	N/A
IGN	9/10	7/10
Nintendo Life	9/10	9/10
PCMag	3.5/5	3.5/5
Shacknews	8/10	N/A

Both the Nintendo Switch and Nintendo Switch 2 editions of Super Mario Party Jamboree received "generally favorable" reviews from critics, according to the review aggregation website Metacritic; the former is currently the highest-rated Mario Party game on the website. In Japan, four critics from Famitsu gave the game a total score of 36 out of 40, with each critic awarding the game a 9 out of 10.

IGN's Logan Plant lauded the game as "an amazing follow-up to Mario Party Superstars and easily one of the best games in the series". Nintendo Life's PJ O'Reilly likewise praised Super Mario Party Jamboree as "the best Mario Party to date". Ozzie Mejia of Shacknews agreed that the game is "one of the most polished entries in the series yet". Writing for GameSpot, Dan Ryckert complimented the game boards, though criticized some of the game modes and minigames. In a more critical review, Eurogamer's Katharine Castle wrote that Super Mario Party Jamboree "has the misfortune of not being very fun, and mistakes the volatility of chance and happenstance for being the same thing as competitive satisfaction that comes from playing a good game well".

=== Sales ===
The game performed well commercially, debuting atop the charts in Japan with retail sales of 227,569 copies. It also debuted atop the charts in the UK, enjoying opening week sales that were 35 percent higher than that of Mario Party Superstars.

On January 16, 2025, it was reported that the game had sold over one million copies in Japan.

As of June 30, 2026, the game has sold 11.52 million units worldwide. Of that total, 1.15 million units are physical copies of Nintendo Switch 2 Edition + Jamboree TV.

=== Awards ===
Super Mario Party Jamboree was nominated for "Best Family Game" and "Best Multiplayer" at The Game Awards 2024, as well as "Family Game of the Year" at the 28th Annual D.I.C.E. Awards.

Year	Ceremony	Category	Result	Ref.
2024	The Game Awards 2024	Best Family Game	Nominated	
2024	The Game Awards 2024	Best Multiplayer Game	Nominated	
2025	New York Game Awards	Central Park Children's Zoo Award for Best Kids Game	Nominated	
2025	28th Annual D.I.C.E. Awards	Family Game of the Year	Nominated	
2025	21st British Academy Games Awards	Multiplayer	Nominated	
2025	21st British Academy Games Awards	Family	Nominated	
2025	2025 Kids' Choice Awards	Favorite Video Game	Nominated	

== See also ==
- List of Nintendo Switch games
- List of party video games
- List of video games featuring Mario
- 2024 in video games
