= Lists of Japanese games =

List of Japanese games may refer to:

- List of traditional Japanese games
- List of Japanese board games

== See also ==
- Category:Video games developed in Japan
