= 1976 in games =

This page lists board and card games, wargames, miniatures games, and tabletop role-playing games published in 1976. For video games, see 1976 in video gaming.

== Games released or invented in 1976 ==
- Atlantis - 12500 B.C.
- Battle for Andromeda
- Bay of Pigs
- Bunnies & Burrows (tabletop role-playing game)
- Caesar at Alesia (2nd edition)
- Conquistador
- Cosmic Wimpout
- Dixie
- Godsfire
- Invasion America
- Metamorphosis Alpha (tabletop role-playing game)
- Mind War
- Monsters! Monsters! (role-playing game)
- Outreach
- Panzergruppe Guderian
- Plan Táctico y Estratégico de la Guerra
- Rift Trooper
- The Russian Campaign
- Starfaring (tabletop role-playing game)
- Starship & Empire
- Starship Troopers
- Starweb
- Terrible Swift Sword
- UFO: Game of Close Encounters
- War at Sea
- War in Europe
- War of the Ring: The Game of Middle Earth
- War of the Sky Galleons
- Warriors of the Green Planet

== Significant game-related events in 1976 ==
- TSR, Inc. published the first issue of the Dragon magazine.

== See also ==
- 1976 in video gaming
