= List of licensed Risk game boards =

This is a list of licensed Risk game boards.

== English releases ==
=== Risk ===
Essential facts	Detailed information	
Copyright dates: 1959, 1963, 1975, 1980, 1990, 1993, 1999, 2003 Released by: Parker Brothers (Hasbro) Issued through: General release	Game description	The traditional version of Risk.
Copyright dates: 1959, 1963, 1975, 1980, 1990, 1993, 1999, 2003 Released by: Parker Brothers (Hasbro) Issued through: General release	Number of players	2 – 6
Copyright dates: 1959, 1963, 1975, 1980, 1990, 1993, 1999, 2003 Released by: Parker Brothers (Hasbro) Issued through: General release	Army units	Currently army units consist of infantry, cavalry, and cannon; worth 1, 5, and 10 "armies" respectively. In past editions there have been other variations. In 1959, wooden cubes were worth 1 "army", while oblong wooden pieces were worth 10 "armies". This was replaced in the 1963 and 1975 editions for plastic triangle pieces worth 1 "army" and plastic stars worth 10 "armies". In 1980, plastic Roman numerals I, III, V, and X were used as literal numerical representations of army units. This change was reverted in the 1990 version, in favor of the plastic triangles and stars of previous editions. In 1993, the infantry, cavalry, and cannon pieces were introduced and have been used ever since; though in varying designs.
Copyright dates: 1959, 1963, 1975, 1980, 1990, 1993, 1999, 2003 Released by: Parker Brothers (Hasbro) Issued through: General release	Other features	Secret Mission Risk cards, enabling Secret Mission Risk, included since 1993.

=== Castle Risk ===
Essential facts	Detailed information	
Copyright date: 1986 Released by: Parker Brothers Issued through: General release	Game description	A version focusing on Europe in which each player's goal is to protect their castle from attack. It is often considered to be a poor game, but many concepts were used again in later variations.
Copyright date: 1986 Released by: Parker Brothers Issued through: General release	Number of players	2 – 6
Copyright date: 1986 Released by: Parker Brothers Issued through: General release	Army units	Army units consist of plastic triangles, which represent 1 "army", and plastic stars, which represent 10 "armies".
Copyright date: 1986 Released by: Parker Brothers Issued through: General release	Other features	

=== Risk 40th Anniversary Edition ===
Essential facts	Detailed information	
Copyright date: 1999 Released by: Parker Brothers (Hasbro) Issued through: General release	Game description	Features a color-enhanced board and metal pieces.
Copyright date: 1999 Released by: Parker Brothers (Hasbro) Issued through: General release	Number of players	2 – 6
Copyright date: 1999 Released by: Parker Brothers (Hasbro) Issued through: General release	Army units	For the special collectors' edition, army units are made of metal. Infantry pieces worth 1 "army"; cavalry, 5 "armies"; cannon, 10 "armies".
Copyright date: 1999 Released by: Parker Brothers (Hasbro) Issued through: General release	Other features	The movement route between the territories of East Africa and Middle East was removed; this may or may not be a manufacturing error.

=== Risk: 2210 A.D. ===
Essential facts	Detailed information	
Copyright dates: 2001 Released by: Avalon Hill/Hasbro Issued through: General release	Game description	An award winning futuristic version of Risk. The game features Moon Territories, ocean territories and Commanders.
Copyright dates: 2001 Released by: Avalon Hill/Hasbro Issued through: General release	Number of players	2 – 5
Copyright dates: 2001 Released by: Avalon Hill/Hasbro Issued through: General release	Army units	In addition to normal plastic army figurines, each army also has commanders which can affect battles where they are present.
Copyright dates: 2001 Released by: Avalon Hill/Hasbro Issued through: General release	Other features	Randomly placed disaster zones, in/through which no unit may move, make each game slightly different.

=== Risk: The Lord of the Rings ===
Essential facts	Detailed information	
Copyright date: 2002 Released by: Parker Brothers (Hasbro) Issued through: General release	Game description	Players attempt to conquer Middle-earth from The Lord of the Rings.
Copyright date: 2002 Released by: Parker Brothers (Hasbro) Issued through: General release	Number of players	2 – 4
Copyright date: 2002 Released by: Parker Brothers (Hasbro) Issued through: General release	Army units	Army units include 'light' armies or 'dark' armies. The 'light' armies consist of Elven Archers, Riders of Rohan and eagles. The 'dark' armies consist of orcs, Dark Riders and cavetrolls.
Copyright date: 2002 Released by: Parker Brothers (Hasbro) Issued through: General release	Other features	A ring moves across the gameboard throughout after turns. Once it reaches Mordor, the game ends. Also included leaders and strongholds.

=== Risk: The Lord of the Rings: Gondor & Mordor Expansion Set ===
Essential facts	Detailed information	
Copyright date: 2003 Released by: Parker Brothers (Hasbro) Issued through: General release	Game description	Players attempt to conquer Middle-earth from The Lord of the Rings. This is an extension to Risk: the Lord of the Rings, also includes a 2-player Siege of Minas Tirith mini-game.
Copyright date: 2003 Released by: Parker Brothers (Hasbro) Issued through: General release	Number of players	2 – 4
Copyright date: 2003 Released by: Parker Brothers (Hasbro) Issued through: General release	Army units	Army units include 'light' armies or 'dark' armies. The 'light' armies consist of Elven Archers, Riders of Rohan and eagles. The 'dark' armies consist of orcs, dark riders and cavetrolls (molds). In the European version: the 'light' armies consist of humans, horseman (Rohirrim) and Ents. The 'dark' armies consist of Warg Riders, Morgul Army and the Haradrim (molds).
Copyright date: 2003 Released by: Parker Brothers (Hasbro) Issued through: General release	Other features	A ring moves across the gameboard throughout after turns. Once it reaches Mordor, the game ends. Also included leaders and strongholds.

=== Risk: Lord of the Rings Trilogy Edition ===
Essential facts	Detailed information	
Copyright date: 2003 Released by: Parker Brothers (Hasbro) Issued through: General release	Game description	Combines the first two Lord of the Rings versions, but does not include the Siege of Minas Tirith mini-game.
Copyright date: 2003 Released by: Parker Brothers (Hasbro) Issued through: General release	Number of players	2 – 4
Copyright date: 2003 Released by: Parker Brothers (Hasbro) Issued through: General release	Army units	Army units include 'light' armies or 'dark' armies. The 'light' armies consist of Elven Archers, Riders of Rohan and eagles. The 'dark' armies consist of orcs, Dark Riders and cavetrolls.
Copyright date: 2003 Released by: Parker Brothers (Hasbro) Issued through: General release	Other features	A ring moves through the gameboard as the players take turns. Once it reaches Mordor, the game ends. Also included leaders and strongholds.

=== Risk Godstorm ===
Essential facts	Detailed information	
Copyright dates: 2004 Released by: Avalon Hill/Hasbro Issued through: General release	Game description	A version based on the mythological pantheons of various ancient civilizations. The map is a stylized continent flanked by the island of Atlantis. Dead units battle in the underworld for the chance for resurrection.
Copyright dates: 2004 Released by: Avalon Hill/Hasbro Issued through: General release	Number of players	2 – 5
Copyright dates: 2004 Released by: Avalon Hill/Hasbro Issued through: General release	Army units	In addition to normal plastic army figurines, each army also has gods which can affect battles where they are present.
Copyright dates: 2004 Released by: Avalon Hill/Hasbro Issued through: General release	Other features	Randomly placed plague zones; "Faith tokens" which act as currency to buy Gods and cards, each of which have different characteristics.

=== Risk: Star Wars: Clone Wars Edition ===
Essential facts	Detailed information	
Copyright date: 2005 Released by: Parker Brothers (Hasbro) Issued through: General release	Game description	Set in the Star Wars universe during the Clone Wars. The player can fight on the side of the Separatists or the Republic, using either the classic Risk rules or the Clone Wars variations.
Copyright date: 2005 Released by: Parker Brothers (Hasbro) Issued through: General release	Number of players	2 – 4
Copyright date: 2005 Released by: Parker Brothers (Hasbro) Issued through: General release	Army units	
Copyright date: 2005 Released by: Parker Brothers (Hasbro) Issued through: General release	Other features	Included "Order 66" which allows for shorter game play.

=== Risk: Star Wars Original Trilogy Edition ===
Essential facts	Detailed information	
Copyright date: 2006 Released by: Parker Brothers (Hasbro) Issued through: General release	Game description	Set in the Star Wars universe, players play as the Galactic Empire, the Rebel Alliance, or the Hutts. This version is unique in that each of the factions has a different set of goals and victory conditions.
Copyright date: 2006 Released by: Parker Brothers (Hasbro) Issued through: General release	Number of players	2 – 5
Copyright date: 2006 Released by: Parker Brothers (Hasbro) Issued through: General release	Army units	
Copyright date: 2006 Released by: Parker Brothers (Hasbro) Issued through: General release	Other features	

=== Risk: The Transformers Edition ===
Essential facts	Detailed information	
Copyright date: 2007 Released by: Parker Brothers (Hasbro) Issued through: General release	Game description	Based on the Transformers film, players can either play on the side of the Autobots or the Decepticons on a Cybertron stylized map.
Copyright date: 2007 Released by: Parker Brothers (Hasbro) Issued through: General release	Number of players	2 – 4
Copyright date: 2007 Released by: Parker Brothers (Hasbro) Issued through: General release	Army units	Single units are depicted as robots, and three army units are futuristic tanks
Copyright date: 2007 Released by: Parker Brothers (Hasbro) Issued through: General release	Other features	Leaders and location that can "transform" and have special powers based on form. Also some boards can be changed by spinning or sliding them.

=== Risk Junior: Narnia ===
Essential facts	Detailed information	
Copyright dates: 2006 Released by: Parker Brothers (Hasbro) Issued through: General release, exclusive to United Kingdom	Game description	Based on The Lion, the Witch and the Wardrobe, players can play as either the forces of Aslan or as the forces of the White Witch. It is the first Risk game made for young children.
Copyright dates: 2006 Released by: Parker Brothers (Hasbro) Issued through: General release, exclusive to United Kingdom	Number of players	2 – 4
Copyright dates: 2006 Released by: Parker Brothers (Hasbro) Issued through: General release, exclusive to United Kingdom	Army units	
Copyright dates: 2006 Released by: Parker Brothers (Hasbro) Issued through: General release, exclusive to United Kingdom	Other features	

=== Risk: Halo Wars ===
Essential facts	Detailed information	
Copyright dates: 2009 Released by: Parker Brothers (Hasbro) Issued through: General release.	Game description	Based on Halo Wars, played just like Risk Revised.
Copyright dates: 2009 Released by: Parker Brothers (Hasbro) Issued through: General release.	Number of players	3 – 5
Copyright dates: 2009 Released by: Parker Brothers (Hasbro) Issued through: General release.	Army units	Army units are 1 and 3.
Copyright dates: 2009 Released by: Parker Brothers (Hasbro) Issued through: General release.	Other features	There are three different races as noticed in the Halo storyline. There are the UNSC, the Covenant, and the Flood. In the 5-player mode the UNSC has two allied forces and they fight against the Covenant, as both sides also try to extinguish the powerful flood diseased creatures. There are heroes which give combat bonuses.

=== Risk Legacy ===
Essential facts	Detailed information	
Copyright dates: 2011 Released by: Hasbro (Heidelberger Spieleverlag) Issued through: General release.	Game description	A game set in the future on an "earth clone" that has permanent changes to the game board and cards each time you play.
Copyright dates: 2011 Released by: Hasbro (Heidelberger Spieleverlag) Issued through: General release.	Number of players	3 – 5
Copyright dates: 2011 Released by: Hasbro (Heidelberger Spieleverlag) Issued through: General release.	Other features	There are five factions, each with different pieces and rules. As the originator of the term Legacy game, rules/mechanics are added and changed, previous games permanently affect all future games, and cards are permanently modified or destroyed.

=== Risk: Metal Gear Solid ===
Essential facts	Detailed information
Risk: Metal Gear Solid is a board game, released in 2011 by USAopoly, based upon the game Risk, with the setting of Hideo Kojima's Metal Gear Solid 4: Guns of the Patriots video game.	Gameplay is similar to the standard edition of Risk, but it includes heroes that upgrade one attacking or defending die to an eight sided die if they're attacking a territory or in an attacked territory. The game also includes 'Drebin Cards', which can be purchased by players and provide a range of effects on the game, and Outer Haven, a group of territories that can travel to several places on the board.

=== Risk: Starcraft ===
Essential facts	Detailed information	
Copyright dates: 2012 Released by: Hasbro (Heidelberger Spieleverlag) Issued through: General release.	Game description	StarCraft players will once again find the StarCraft universe in jeopardy. Players will choose from the Terran, Protoss or Zerg factions and six unique heroes to ultimately bring order to the galaxy. The struggles portrayed in this real time strategy game series adapt perfectly to classic tabletop RISK gameplay, and the winner will be determined by astute deployment of military might and strategic field tactics. RISK: StarCraft includes 4 play modes and sports over 290 custom playing pieces.
Copyright dates: 2012 Released by: Hasbro (Heidelberger Spieleverlag) Issued through: General release.	Number of players	3 – 5
Copyright dates: 2012 Released by: Hasbro (Heidelberger Spieleverlag) Issued through: General release.	Other features	-Territory cards have the option to be used for unique attack or defense abilities instead of just cashing them in for more units like in standard Risk. -There is a hero unit for each army so it adds +1 to your attack dice or defense roll. -Includes 4 ways to play: Basic Training - quick and easy Command Room - fast-paced and strategic Total Domination - updated versions of the classic game Team Play - take on your opponents in 2 v 2 and 3 v 3 game-modes

=== Risk: Plants vs. Zombies (2013) ===
A mob of fun-dead zombies are invading the quaint town of Brainsborough, while the pea-packing plants branch out for a battle of suburban domination!

Risk: Plants vs. Zombies is a two-player-only version of the decades-old Risk game, with one player controlling the plants of the wildly successful Plants vs. Zombies digital game and the other controlling the zombies. The game features a double-sided game board and three play modes: mission objectives, tower defense, and total domination.

=== Risk Europe ===
Risk Europe differs markedly from the original game, in that each territory generates a specific income for the player, and the player can purchase new units based on the amount of revenue received. Also, each unit succeeds in its attack if the player hits a specific number or lower during the attack. Another change is a new type of unit known as siege weapons is provided to players. Also players have different types of units, each with their own types of tactics and attacks.

== French releases ==
=== La Conquête du monde^{†} ===
Essential facts	Detailed information	
Copyright date: 1957 Released by: Miro Issued through:	Game description	
Copyright date: 1957 Released by: Miro Issued through:	Number of players	
Copyright date: 1957 Released by: Miro Issued through:	Army units	Armies made out of rectangular wooden cubes. Pieces representing ten armies are made of triangular pieces of wood.
Copyright date: 1957 Released by: Miro Issued through:	Other features	

^{†} Although not technically a licensed Risk variation, La Conquête du monde is included in this list as it is the precursor to the popular English version of Risk. 4. Le jeu mondial de stategie 1970-1976 Marque et module deposes. Tous droits reserves. plastic armies, wooden dice

=== Risk: Édition Napoléon ===
Essential facts	Detailed information	
Copyright date: 1999 Released by: Tilsit, Hasbro Issued through:	Game description	
Copyright date: 1999 Released by: Tilsit, Hasbro Issued through:	Number of players	2 – 5
Copyright date: 1999 Released by: Tilsit, Hasbro Issued through:	Army units	
Copyright date: 1999 Released by: Tilsit, Hasbro Issued through:	Other features	Adds generals, fortresses, and naval units.

=== Risk: Édition Napoléon: Extension Empire Ottoman ===
Essential facts	Detailed information	
Copyright date: 2000 Released by: Tilsit, Hasbro Issued through:	Game description	Adds a sixth player to Risk: Édition Napoléon.
Copyright date: 2000 Released by: Tilsit, Hasbro Issued through:	Number of players	2 – 6
Copyright date: 2000 Released by: Tilsit, Hasbro Issued through:	Army units	
Copyright date: 2000 Released by: Tilsit, Hasbro Issued through:	Other features	

== Brazilian releases ==
=== WAR ===
Released by Grow in 1972. A few other Brazilian modified versions were released:

- WAR•II (1981), featuring air strikes and new rules for trading cards and armies.
- WAR: Star Wars Episode I (1999), which uses the original rules in the Star Wars universe.
- WAR Júnior (2000), with simplified rules, no territory cards and an alternative attack system by missiles.
- WAR: Império Romano (Roman Empire, 2007), which uses the original rules in a map of the Roman Empire around year 140 CE. Suited for 4 players only.
- WAR: Batalhas Mitológicas (Mythological Battles, 2012), featuring a map of Ancient Greece and an alternative rule set (in addition to the original), which includes mythological beings, 8-sided dice, temples which grant devotion tokens used to evoke the powers of the gods (Ares, Athena, Hades, Poseidon and Zeus) and different rules for trading cards and armies. Suited for 4 players. This is the only version with army pieces in different shapes for different players: centaurs (white), cyclopes (yellow), harpies (green) and minotaurs (black).
- WAR: Vikings (2017), featuring a map of Northern Europe (Scandinavia, Germany, Iceland and British Isles) and advanced rules (in addition to the classic rule), including new commander and Viking ship miniatures, command cards that change every battle involving the commanders, harbors and new rules for blocking sea routes and sea combat. The main addition is a Valhalla side board, where defeated armies go to, and a 'burnout' system that eliminates these armies for the rest of play in order to evoke the powers of Norse gods (Thor, Loki, Freya, Odin and Hel), which change in every combat. Suited for 4 players. This is the first version whose board map has less territories: 36 instead of the usual 42. This fact, allied to the "burnout" system, allows 2-player matches without the use of any "neutral army" rules, besides reducing play time as a whole.
