= Major Command Game =

Online turn-based strategy game

- Company type: Private
- Industry: Computer games
- Services: Risk online game
- Website: majorcommand.com

Major Command Game is a turn-based strategy online game website that allows users to play Risk online among multiple users.

== History ==
The game was created in 2009 by a group of players who were not satisfied by the online risk games available on the other websites at that time. As a result, the game inherently provides a simple user interface, several new maps, and an active community of players. However, the key difference is the lack of ads on the website. The website does not charge for playing the game. Players are allowed to play up to 4 simultaneous games for free, with no limit on the total number of games played in a lifetime. Revenue is generated by donations and some additional features like online tournaments and unlimited simultaneous games are available to users who purchase a subscription.

== Game play ==
The game play of Major Command Game is very similar to Risk, however, the game also introduces command cards as opposed to standard territory cards, and the design of the maps differ from those of the original board game. Players deploy troops at the beginning of each turn as they would in the original board game. A players can attack another region by "rolling" the dice against his opponent. The computer generates a number from 1 to 6 for each dice, and the highest rolls determines the winner of a battle. This continues until the player ends their turn, allowing the next player to start their turn, or when a player wins the game. A standard game can be won when a single player occupies all countries or regions on the map. Variations of the standard game include team games and assassin games. In a team game the game is won when all members of the other teams are eliminated and at least one (or more) members of one winning team remain. In an assassin game, each player in the game is given a "target". The target is another player in that game. Conversely, each player in that game is also themselves a target of another player. The objective of an assassin’s game is to be the first player to eliminate your target before any other player eliminates their target, or before being eliminated yourself.

The original Risk board game produced by Parker Brothers uses a map of the world which contains 6 continents and 47 territories. It is similar to the Major Command Game classic map of the world which contains 7 continents and 50 territories. The additional continent is Antarctica, which has the 3 extra territories. Both maps use regions and territories that are not accurate representations of real countries.
