= Realpolitik (disambiguation) =

Realpolitik is politics based on practical considerations, rather than ideals.

Realpolitik may also refer to:

- Realpolitik: A History, a 2015 book by historian John Bew, an account of Realpolitik
- Realpolitik (game), a play-by-mail wargame
