= Risk II =

2000 video game

- Developer: Deep Red Games
- Publisher: Hasbro Interactive (Note: Released under the MicroProse label)
- Composer: Peter Connelly
- Platforms: Microsoft Windows, Mac OS
- Release: Microsoft Windows: NA: March 22, 2000; EU: 2000; Mac OS: NA: October 17, 2000
- Genre: Board game
- Modes: Single-player, multiplayer

Risk II is a video game version of the board game Risk, developed by Deep Red Games and published by Hasbro Interactive under the MicroProse label. It is a sequel to the 1996 version of Risk.

In addition to the classic board game style of play, Risk II introduced new modes including a single-player tournament and a brand new concept called SameTime, in which turns are taken simultaneously by all players. Up to eight players can play, in any combination of human and computer opponents (as long as at least one player is human). Available computer opponents are an assortment of mostly 18th and 19th century generals: Campbell, Mackenzie, Marmont, Barbacena, D'Erlon, Maransin, Solignac, Sherbrooke, Aubert, Spencer, Taupin, Freire, Vauban, Baird, Bonaparte and Wellington. Each computer opponent has a different style of attack and a different reliability in honoring alliances.

== Game Types ==
=== Classic Risk ===
Classic style employs the standard rules of Risk (depending on version, see below), which is one attack move at a time from one location. In this game type, a player can attack as many times as he likes, and may move through multiple territories with one army, although at least one unit has to stay in every territory he controls. The player also has the option to retreat from an attack and move units from one territory to a bordering territory at the end of his attack phase.

=== Real Time Risk ===
Real Time Risk is a completely different concept, and mostly suited for digital play. A player may use two or more different armies from one or more different territories to attack a bordering territory.

After placing reinforcements and making a move, the map will show the moves of all players and where they will attack. Then, each battle is fought battle individually (unless AI are battling each other; in that case, it is automatically resolved) until all moves have been played.

The Real Time concept requires dynamically different strategies from that of the Classic game. An attack from 2 or more territories to a single enemy territory is called a 'Mass Invasion'. If two different players attack a territory that fails to defend them, then a 'Spoils of War' battle ensues at the end of the turn between the two armies who fought for the territory in question. A player may only move through one territory at a time when attacking, although each player is granted a 'Surge Attack', which can be used to thrust a designated number of soldiers from a newly acquired territory into a neighbouring one. If two armies meet when attacking, a 'Border Clash' battle occurs, which is the first to be resolved.

The dice are also different, and create a new strategy for using armies. If a player uses 3 armies to attack (over 3 bordering territories), he will use 3 dice. If a player uses just one army, he will only use one die and so forth. Also, the greater the number of soldiers in the army, the different color of die. The darker the color, the more "loaded" the die is. For example, if an attacking territory has 30 or more soldiers, it will receive a black die, which will usually roll 4-6's, whereas an army of 5 or less will use a white die, which rolls lower numbers more often. The other "loaded" ranks, from highest to lowest are: red, orange, yellow. As a result, the ranks range from white, yellow, orange, red (dark), and a deep black. Since the battle greatly favors the side that uses mass invasions (they get more dice), sitting back and defending is not a good idea. It is not uncommon for a two sided mass invasion to crush a defending army that is twice the invasion size. The player should try to mobilize all border forces to attack whenever possible. This way the player can avoid the enemy mass invasions and fight some fair border clashes battle, damaging the enemy in the process. Most of the time, the benefit of holding a continent border territory is not worth the risk of losing a mass number of soldiers from enemy mass invasions. In addition, since the enemy is only allowed one surge attack per round, the damage he can do to the player's inner territory is limited. In fact, the enemies that surge attack deep into the player's territory risk having it crushed by the player's mass invasions in the next round, assuming the player can provide a reasonable resistance.

=== Tournament ===
Tournament employs both Classic and Same Time rules. There are a total of 16 rounds of incremental difficulty, and the player is scored after every round. Should the player lose a single round, the tournament ends. The aim is to gain as many points as possible, by completing the round's objective and eliminating opponents. There is a scoreboard which is pre-filled with different players before play.

== Versions ==
Two versions of Risk II were developed: the U.S. version (v1.01u) and the European version (v1.01e). This was necessary because the board game rules actually differ slightly based on where the game is played. In the U.S. version, the "trade-on-the-fly rule," which forces a player to trade cards in the middle of a turn if he or she has more than the 5-card maximum, is in effect. In the European version, there is no "trade-on-the-fly". There is also a difference in the options a player has when rolling dice to defend a territory with two battalions. In the European version of Risk II a player may only roll one die while in the US version a player may choose to roll two dice or one die (to defend with either one or two battalions). The two versions of Risk II are however, completely compatible with each other when used in multi-player games online or across a network. Whichever version is installed by the host of the game is the version that will be used for each player. In the classic board game Risk, the U.S. version uses ascending card trade-in values (4 additional reinforcements, then 6,8,10,12,15,20,25,...), while the European version uses set card trade-in values (Infantry-4, Cavalry-6, Cannon-8, One of each-10). In Risk II, both versions have the option of using ascending or set trade-in values, and also an additional option of ascending by one (4,5,6...), which is a compromise between ascending and set.

== Online play ==
Originally the MSN Gaming Zone supported free online play for Risk II, though it ceased support of the game on January 31, 2006.

== Reception ==
Reception

Review scores
Publication	Score
Computer Gaming World	4/5
GameSpy	80%
PC Gamer (US)	48%
PC Zone	81/100
Computer Games Strategy Plus	4.5/5
MacHome Journal	4/5

In Computer Gaming World, Ken Brown wrote that Risk II "delivers enough gameplay and play options to satisfy just about anyone". However, he criticized the balance of its Same Time mode, which he argued favored attackers. Jim Cobb of Computer Games Strategy Plus raved that Risk II's designers had "infused the classic game with enough variations, options and graphics to make it seem like a new experience to even the most hardened die-thrower." Although he criticized its online multiplayer mode, he summarized the game as "a 'must buy' for all gamers, regardless of the niche in which they usually dwell."

Writing for PC Zone, Richie Shoemaker praised Risk II as an improvement over its predecessor, and called the game's Same Time mode a "minor masterpiece". He concluded, "Best of all, however, is that for once, someone — in this case developer Deep Red — has recreated a classic board game successfully to PC and done it well." In a negative review, PC Gamer US's Barry Brenesal wrote, "Who needs another board game that wasn't imaginatively recreated on the PC?" He found Risk II uninspired and noted technical issues.
