= Miro Company =

Miro is a game manufacturer in France. Its most notable publication is "La Conquête du Monde," the first version of Risk ever produced.

== History ==
Miro was founded in Paris in 1936 by Fred Mirowitch and Leo J. Frankenthal. The company changed hands in 1950, after which it became the producer of French-language versions of Waddington Ltd. and Parker Brothers games, later becoming a subsidiary of General Mills. In 1980, General Mills merged its three toy business in France (Miro Company, Parker Brothers France and Meccano France) forming Miro-Meccano.

In 1985, General Mills spun off its toy division as Kenner Parker Toys, Inc. Miro-Meccano was renamed Kenner Parker and the Meccano brand and its factory in Calais were sold.

In 1987, Tonka purchased Kenner Parker for $555 million, borrowing extensively to fund the acquisition. However, the cost of servicing the debt meant Tonka itself had to find a buyer and it was eventually acquired by Hasbro in 1991.
