= Conquistador (game) =

Board game

Issue 58 of Strategy & Tactics contained Conquistador as a pull-out game

Conquistador, originally subtitled "The Age of Exploration: 1495–1600", is a board game published by Simulations Publications, Inc. (SPI) in 1976 that simulates the exploration of the New World in the 16th century. Players take on the role of European countries sending expeditions to find gold and establish colonies. Although the design uses the trappings of board wargames such as a hex map, combat is not a major part of the game.

== Description ==
Conquistador is a game for 1–5 players (SPI edition) or 1–4 players (Avalon Hill edition) where the players vie to accumulate as much wealth, land and exploration as possible.

=== Components ===
The SPI version of the game published in Strategy & Tactics #58 contains:

- 22" x 32" hex grid game map of North & South America
- 200 die-cut counters representing soldiers, colonists, missionaries, carracks, caravels, galleon fleets, and gold bars, along with individually named explorers, privateers, and conquistadors. (Assistant designer Greg Costikyan noted that because it was a magazine pull-out, SPI limited the game to only 200 counters, inevitably leading to shortages of certain counters during the game.)
- 12-page rules booklet

The boxed set that SPI released later also contains two six-sided dice.

The Avalon Hill edition contains 520 counters.

=== Gameplay ===
The basic game represents the activities of Spain, England, France or Portugal. The game also includes a solitaire scenario where Spain is played by a single player, and the original SPI edition includes optional rules for an additional player to take a purely financial role as the German bankers.

The map is divided into areas such as Patagonia and California, each with ratings reflecting the hostility and fertility of the environment and the attitude of native inhabitants to European settlement.

The first turn begins in 1495. Each subsequent turn represents an advance of five years, with the game ending in 1600 after 22 turns.

Each turn consists of five phases, each of which is in turn divided into several segments.

1. Royal Council phase: Planning, beginning with a Random Events segment which determines money and colonist availability, as well as unforeseen events such as plague or unusual requirements such as searching for the Seven Cities of Cibola or El Dorado. The players also determine the order of play for the remainder of the turn and plan their expeditions, purchasing materials and forces and recording the composition and destination of each expedition.
2. Initial Naval phase: Players move their expeditions to and from the New World. They may also move within the New World, possibly engaging in naval combat or invasions, after which all expeditions check for possible losses due to attrition.
3. Segments of the Land phase: Attempts to discover gold and production from existing gold mines, movement and combat of land units, combat with natives, attrition of land units, and collection of resources.
4. Final Naval phase: Another opportunity to move expeditions to or from Europe, followed by attrition checks and credit for discoveries made by expeditions which have reached a friendly port.
5. Maintenance phase: Players pay for units which will be kept in play for the next turn.

In addition, players can gain Victory Points for being the first to complete certain goals listed in a Discovery Table. For example, being the first to land on a hex in South America gains 35 Victory Points. Being the first to explore the length of the Amazon River is worth 125 Victory Points.

=== Victory conditions ===
At the end of 21 turns (the year 1600), each player is awarded

- 2 Victory Points for each ducat in their treasury
- 150 Victory Points for each area of the map under the player's control
- Points gained for being the first to complete an Exploration Goal on the Discovery Table.

The player with the most Victory Points is the winner.

== Publication history ==
The game was designed by Richard Berg, with assistance from Greg Costikyan, with artwork and graphic design by Redmond A. Simonsen. It was first published by SPI as a pull-out game in Issue 58 of Strategy & Tactics, and then released as a boxed set. Although it generated steady sales, it was not a bestseller for SPI, never making into their Top Ten list. As assistant designer Greg Costikyan noted in 1985, "When Conquistador was first published, it met with a mixed reception on the part of [Strategy & Tactics] subscribers, primarily, I think, because S&T subscribers preferred hard World War II military games, and Conquistador was rather anomalous from their point of view."

After TSR took over SPI in 1982, it sold the rights to Conquistador to Avalon Hill, who slightly revised the game rules and more than doubled the number of counters to alleviate the counter supply problem experienced in the SPI edition, then republished it in 1983. Seven years later, in 1990, Avalon Hill published a much simplified version of the game for 2–6 players titled New World.

== Reception ==
In Issue 13 of Perfidious Albion, Charles Vasey and Geoff Barnard discussed this game. Vasey called it, "A very neat game which outpaces Russian Civil War as both a political and economic simulation. Its problems are the very long time taken to play through, and the massed dicing ... Its successes are the mass of information crammed into the game that allows sensible decisions to be made." Barnard replied, "Technically and historically this is a very interesting game, although it would seem to encourage the Machiavellian outlook amongst gamers rather more than actually happened." Vasey concluded, "Be very careful with your expenditure early in the game, and remember that not possessing an explorer may prevent you from doing great deeds but it also allows you to amass some wealth. Nice." Barnard concluded, "The game certainly works well as a game, all credit to the designers for that, although it is long and can be hard work."

In his 1977 book The Comprehensive Guide to Board Wargaming, Nick Palmer called this "A complex and highly entertaining game." Palmer concluded, "very much a 'fun' game reminiscent of but even more varied than Kingmaker. Not a supreme test of skill."

In The Guide to Simulations/Games for Education and Training, Martin Campion wondered if this game would work in the classroom, saying, "The game is often more complex than I would ideally want it to be, and it is guilty of hurrying French and English colonization along to make a more competitive game, but it is fascinating and the subject is big enough to justify the expense in time and effort."

In Issue 31 of Moves, David Grant defined the type of players that would enjoying this game, stating, "If you liked the financial challenge of Monopoly, but felt it lacked the combat element of the local branch of the mob; if you liked the player interaction of Pit, but were too sophisticated for its boisterousness; if you liked the combat of Chickamauga, but missed the feel of cold(?) cash; if you enjoyed the maneuvering of Chess, but missed that element provided by the spotted cube; if you like redoing history without the sweat, you will want to play Conquistador." He concluded that Conquistador is "a game that should provide hours of keen competition."

In Issue 42 of Moves, Jonathan Southard wrote, "Very few games can approach Richard Berg's Conquistador for entertainment value. The exploitation of a new continent is a tremendously attractive game situation, and the game mechanics are dynamic and free-wheeling."

In Issue 71 of Moves, Joe Miranda commented, "Conquistador is a grand accomplishment, a wargame that recreates an entire period of history, not just an individual war."

Jon Freeman, writing in The Complete Book of Wargames (1980), said that Conquistador "may be the best of Richard Berg's designs", and that while "too cynically realistic" in favoring colony development over the glamour of exploration, it is nevertheless "a lot of fun".

== Awards ==
At the 1977 Origins Awards, Conquistador was a finalist for the Charles S. Roberts Award in the category of "Best Strategic Game of 1976".

== Other reviews ==
- Fire & Movement Special Issue #1
- The Wargamer Vol.1 #4
- Line of Departure #9
- Strategist #189
- American Wargamer Vol.4 #7
- Jeux & Stratégie #22
