= Plan Táctico y Estratégico de la Guerra =

Argentine strategy board game

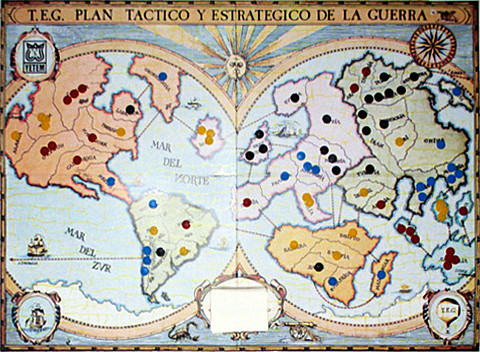
- Playing TEG
- Designers: David Jiterman
- Illustrators: María M. Aramburu
- Publishers: Yetem S.A.
- Players: 2–6
- Setup time: 5–10 minutes
- Playing time: 1–8 (or more) hours (player dependent)
- Chance: medium
- Age range: 8+
- Skills: Tactics, Strategy, and Negotiation

Plan Táctico y Estratégico de la Guerra (commonly referred to as TEG) is an Argentinian strategy board wargame published in 1976, based on the game Risk. The name is Spanish for Tactical and Strategical War Plan.

== Gameplay ==
TEG follows a gameplay quite similar to the strategy board game Risk, since it also features a board divided in many different regions and sub-regions along with the implementation of dice to decide battle results.

=== Goal ===
The goal of the game is to be the first player to fulfill the requisites of an objective, without mattering whether it is the common objective or the secret objective.

==== Common Objective ====
The Common objective is to conquer 30 countries; this objective is the same for all players.

==== Secret Objective ====
Apart from the common objective, players have a secret objective; unlike the common objective, the secret objective is:

- Hidden to other players
- Unique, it varies per player

=== Board ===
The board is divided into six continents which consist of a certain number of countries each; the total number of countries present in the game board is 50. These countries were randomly selected, and continents are slightly misrepresented.

The 50 Countries sorted into their respective continents are the following:

North America: Canada; Yukon; Alaska; Greenland; Oregon; California; Mexico; New York; Terranova; Labrador	Europe: Great Britain; Iceland; Spain; France; Germany; Italy; Poland; Russia; Sweden	Asia: Arabia; Aral; China; India; Iran; Tartary; Taymyr; Japan; Kamchatka; Siberia; Mongolia; Gobi; Malaysia; Turkey; Israel
South America: Argentina; Brazil; Peru; Colombia; Chile; Uruguay	Africa: Sahara; Ethiopia; Egypt; Madagascar; Zaire; South Africa	Asia: Arabia; Aral; China; India; Iran; Tartary; Taymyr; Japan; Kamchatka; Siberia; Mongolia; Gobi; Malaysia; Turkey; Israel
South America: Argentina; Brazil; Peru; Colombia; Chile; Uruguay	Africa: Sahara; Ethiopia; Egypt; Madagascar; Zaire; South Africa	Oceania: Sumatra; Borneo; Java; Australia

== Variants ==
- TEG 2, an advanced version of TEG with different types of armies.
- TEG: La Revancha, an advanced version of TEG with same core rules, but far more countries and the addition of missiles.

== Popular culture ==
The game appeared once in the film Kamchatka. Although the film takes place in 1976 and their protagonists (Ricardo Darín and Cecilia Roth) are shown playing TEG, the game was still not released for public sale. Kamchatka is the Russian northeastern state which a character uses as his last resort to win the game, thus alluding to the family situation of hiding away from the government.

It has been also referenced in a diapers TV advertisement, in which -among other criteria- the mother and the father play TEG in order to decide who cleans the baby ("China ataca Kamchatka" : "China attacks Kamchatka" the woman says).
