= RisiKo! =

Strategy game, variant of Risk

- RisiKo! board
- Publishers: Giochiclub (1968–1977); Editrice Giochi (1977–2016); Spin Master (2016–present)
- Years active: 1968–present
- Genres: Strategy game Board game War game
- Players: 3–6
- Setup time: 5–10 minutes
- Playing time: 35–300 minutes
- Chance: High (6 dice, cards)
- Skills: Strategy, tactics, negotiation

RisiKo! is an Italian strategy board game based on Risk. Unlike classic versions of Risk, the object of the game is the achievement of a predefined, secret target that is different for each player: the target can be either the conquest of a certain number of territories, of two or more continents, or the annihilation of one opponent.

== History ==
RisiKo! derives from the 1957 French game La Conquête du Monde, better known worldwide as Risk.

The first Italian edition dates 1968, published by Milanese publisher Giochiclub that distributed games of several European companies and mixed features of different versions: the name RisiKo! derives from the German version Risiko; the rules were almost identical to the French version, with some notes in the manual taken from the Anglo-American edition; tokens were wooden cube-shaped. As in the first French edition, 3 dice were used for defense, initial forces were distributed more randomly, and players received one card at the beginning of their own turn as well as from conquering territories.

In 1973 Giochiclub published a new version with same rules, but introduced plastic tank-shaped and machinegun-shaped tokens (to represent one and five armies, respectively).

In 1977 Editrice Giochi became the exclusive publisher of RisiKo! and renovated the edition by adopting new rules, among which target cards (before the only aim was to conquer the entire world), the nineteenth-century style planisphere as in the American edition (but with a border between Middle East and China), the random distribution of the initial territories and the balanced distribution of initial armies already present in the European editions. Moreover, flag-shaped tokens were introduced instead of machinegun-shaped tokens to represent 10 armies.

== Features ==
=== Board ===
The board in RisiKo! represents the world, divided into 42 territories across 6 continents.

Continent	# territories	Territories
North America	9	Alaska, Northwest Territories, Greenland, Alberta, Ontario, Quebec, West United States, Eastern U.S., Central America
South America	4	Venezuela, Peru, Brazil, Argentina
Europe	7	Iceland, Scandinavia, Great Britain, North Europe, West Europe, South Europe, Ukraine
Africa	6	North Africa, Egypt, Congo, East Africa, Southern Africa, Madagascar
Asia	12	Urals, Siberia, Yakutia, Chita, Kamchatka, Japan, Mongolia, Afghanistan, Middle East, India, China, Siam
Oceania	4	Indonesia, New Guinea, East Australia, Western Australia

Each territory is represented by a Territory card. At the beginning of the game, these cards are distributed randomly to the players, and determine which territories each player controls at the start. Players then mark their territories by placing at least one army on them and give back their Territory cards, that will be used later for a different purpose. During the game, players can conquer new territories by attacking them from an adjacent territory they already control.

=== Armies ===
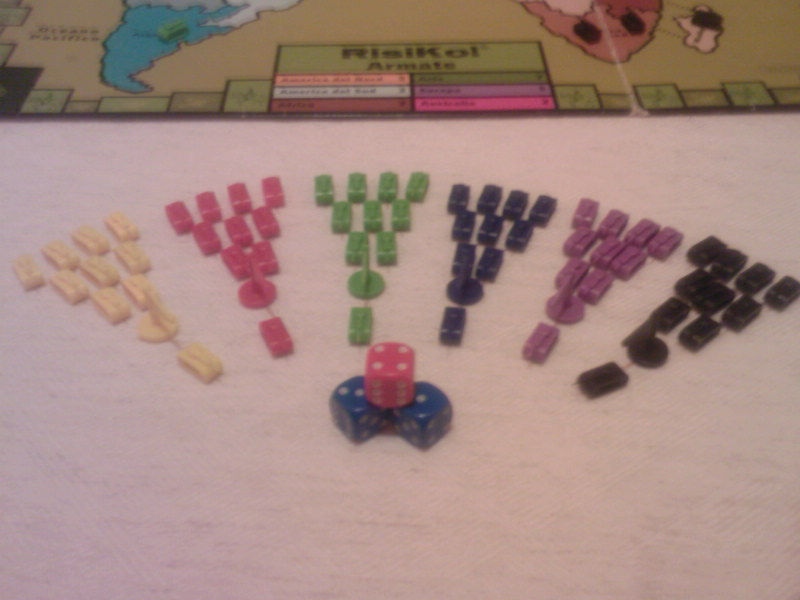
The armies in RisiKo! come in six colours: yellow, red, green, blue, purple and black.

Each player has armies of a different color, represented by small plastic tanks. At the start of the game, players receive a certain amount of armies. They can distribute their armies however they like across their territories, but each territory must have at least one army. Players then get reinforcement armies at the start of all of their turns, proportional to the number of territories they control. Players also receive extra armies for controlling entire continents and for trading in sets of Territory cards.

The number of armies each player starts with depends on the number of players:

- 35 if there are 3 players;
- 30 if there are 4 players;
- 25 if there are 5 players;
- 20 if there are 6 players.

Players can move as many armies as they want between two adjacent territories, once per turn.

=== Targets ===
At the beginning of the game, each player is given a random Target card, which tells them their secret mission. To win the game, they have to complete this mission.

In the original version, the possible missions are:

- Conquer 18 territories and control both of them with at least two armies.
- Conquer 24 territories.
- Conquer all of North America and Africa.
- Conquer all of North America and Oceania.
- Conquer all of Asia and Oceania.
- Conquer all of Asia and Africa.
- Conquer all of Europe, South America, and a third continent.
- Conquer all of Europe, Oceania, and a third continent.
- Completely eliminate all armies of a specific color. If that's impossible (because the player is using that color, no one is using that color, or the player using that color has already been eliminated), the mission becomes conquering 24 territories.

In tournaments, there are 16 different Target cards that display the territories the player needs to conquer visually.

=== Trading in system ===
Each of the 42 Territory cards, representing a territory, also has a drawing of either a horseman, a soldier, or a cannon. There are also two additional joker cards that feature all three of the drawings, which do not represent any territory. At every turn, a player receives a Territory card if they conquer at least one territory (but do not get more cards for subsequent territories). Players can then trade in different combinations of these Territory cards at the start of their turn, before doing anything else, to gain extra armies:

- 3 cannons = 4 armies (8 in tournaments)
- 3 soldiers = 6 armies (8 in tournaments)
- 3 horsemen = 8 armies
- 1 cannon, 1 soldier, 1 horseman = 10 armies
- 1 joker plus 2 of either cannons, soldiers, or horsemen = 12 armies

Additionally, if a player trades in a set of three cards and controls any of the corresponding territories, they receive two bonus armies for each of those territories.

=== Rules ===
Most versions of the game can be divided into two main categories: those following the European rules and those following the American rules. The Italian version, RisiKo!, shares some similarities with the European variants, for example the random secret mission, but also has its own unique rules. For instance, in the Italian variant, the defender can also roll up to 3 dice, thus obtaining an advantage over the attacker, while in most variants the maximum number of dice that can be used in a battle is 5, 3 for the attacker, and 2 for the defender.
