= Risk 2210 A.D. =

Board game

- Designers: Rob Daviau; Craig Van Ness
- Publishers: Avalon Hill
- Publication: 2001; 25 years ago
- Years active: 2001–?
- Genres: Board game
- Languages: English
- Players: 2–5
- Playing time: 240'
- Chance: Medium
- Age range: 10+
- Skills: Strategic thought

Risk 2210 A.D. is a 2–5 player board game by Avalon Hill that is a futuristic variant of the classic board game Risk. Risk 2210 A.D. was designed by Rob Daviau and Craig Van Ness and first released in 2001. In 2002, it won the Origins Award for "Best Science Fiction or Fantasy Board Game of 2001".

== Components ==
The boxed set includes:

- 1 Earth Game Board, including land territories and water colonies.
- 1 Moon Game Board
- 5 different colored sets of playing pieces:
  - MODs (Machines of Destruction) in denomination sizes of 1, 3, and 5.
  - 4 Space Stations
  - The 5 commanders
- Energy in denominations of 1s and 5s
- 5 command card decks (1 for each type of commander)
- 3 territory card decks, 1 for each type of territory (land, water, moon)
- 5 Turn Order Markers
- 4 Devastation Markers
- 1 Score Chart
- 6 and 8 sided dice, three of each black (attack dice), and two of each white (defense dice), 10 total dice

=== Box redesign ===
2210 A.D. originally came packaged in a rectangular boxed set with a playing board that folded into fourths. At some point the design changed to a square, like the packaging for Risk Godstorm. The board in the square box folds into sixths, the cardboard playing pieces are one-sided as opposed to being printed on both sides as they were for the rectangular box, and the Moon was printed on much thinner cardstock.

== Gameplay ==
=== Setup ===
Before the game, 4 cards are randomly selected from the land territory deck. Each of the 4 territory cards drawn will have a "devastation marker" placed on its corresponding territory on the earth game board. These territories are impassable for the rest of the game.

Each player is allocated 3 energy chips before the game begins. The number of armies allocated to each player and the process of claiming territories is identical to the Standard Risk board game, but the armies are called MODs; therefore, number of MODs allocated to each player at the beginning of the game depends on the number of players. If three people are playing, each player counts out 35 MODs; four players, 30 MODs; five players, 25 MODs. Players then take turns claiming land territories by placing a 1.0 MOD on an unoccupied land territory until all the land territories are occupied. Players then take turns placing their remaining armies on their claimed land territories. Following MOD placement, each player places a space station, a land commander, and a diplomat on any of their claimed territories.

Water and Lunar territories may not be claimed at the beginning of the game. Devastated land territories can not be claimed or occupied at any point during the game.

=== Determining turn order ===
The game is limited to five rounds called years. At the beginning of each year, players use energy chips they have accumulated to bid for turn order through a first-price sealed-bid auction format. Players secretly bid energy by placing the corresponding energy chips they would bid into a closed hand. Players open their hands containing their bids simultaneously. The highest bidder selects which turn order they want, then the next highest bidder, and so on. The highest bidder may select any turn the player wants; the player is not limited to "first."

=== Ending game ===
After each player has completed their turn, a year is considered to have passed. At the end of year 5, each player's score is calculated based on the number of territories the player owns, colonies the player holds, and the number of colony influence cards the player has the commanders to activate. The player with the highest score wins.

== Player turn ==
=== Turn order overview ===
At the beginning of each player's turn, based on the number of countries the player owns and whole continents the player holds, the player gains additional MODs and energy. The player places the MODs and then has the opportunity to buy additional commanders, cards, and space stations. Then the player may play command cards that they have sufficient energy to activate. Next comes the attack phase in which, if the player successfully takes three contested territories, the player receives one bonus energy and one bonus command card. After the attack phase, the player may move one group of units from any one of the player's territories to any other territory the player occupies, so long as both territories are connected by a path of their own territories.

=== Collection of energy and deployment of MODs ===
Similar to the obtaining reinforcements in classic Risk, players receive additional MODs and Energy at the beginning of their turn. The number of MODs received is a function of the number of territories a player owns, a player's colony bonuses, and the number of space stations a player controls. Players divide their total number of territories, regardless of type, by three and receive that number of MODs rounded down to the nearest integer. If this result is less than three, round up to three MODs. The Score Chart is designed to aide players in this task. Additionally, players receive colony bonuses by occupying all the territories in a land, water, or lunar colony at the beginning of their turn. This is similar to continental bonuses in classic Risk. These MODs are dispersed among the player's controlled territories as they choose.

Players receive Energy equal to the number of MODs received at this point in the turn.

Players also place one MOD on each territory that contains a Space Station they control.

=== Commanders and space stations ===
After players have collected energy and deployed their MODs, players may purchase commanders and space stations. Commanders cost three energy while space stations cost five energy.

One of the biggest differences from classic Risk is the addition of commanders: land, naval, space, nuclear, and diplomat. These fill a number of roles. Their most basic function is to act as an improved army unit, enabling players to roll eight-sided dice rather than the typical six-sided ones. This is explained more thoroughly in the next section. Space and naval commanders allow movement into Moon or Water territories respectively.

=== Command cards ===
Perhaps one of the most important functions of the commanders is allowing the purchase and use of commander cards. After players have purchased and placed their commanders or space station, players may purchase a maximum of four commander cards at a cost of one energy per card. Players may only purchase commander cards if they have the corresponding commander in play. The text of the commander card will illustrate when the card may, or must, be played. Many of the Commander cards have energy costs that must be paid if the card is to be put into play.

Each commander deck adds its own strategic elements to the game. Diplomat cards tend to be low cost cards that increase unit mobility or place a negative effect on other players. Land Cards tend to be low cost cards that increase the number of MODs available to a player. Naval cards emphasize energy gain. Nuclear cards are relatively higher and have sweeping global effects. Space Cards tend to be a mixture of the elements already described. If an Armageddon card is played, then even if your nuclear commander is destroyed mid turn you can finish playing the nuclear card.

=== Invading territories ===
Three major elements differentiate invasion in Risk 2210 A.D. from classic Risk: limitations in which territories may be invaded, how commanders affect dice, and how space stations affect dice. Players may only invade Water or Lunar territories if they have the corresponding commander in play. Additionally Lunar territories can only be invaded from the Earth game board by a territory containing a space station. Only three of the territories on the Moon game board can be invaded into from the Earth game board. These are the Sea of Crisis, Tycho, and Bay of Dew. Players can not invade from the Moon to Earth without the "Invading Earth" card found in the Space Deck.

If no commanders are attacking or defending a territory, play continues identically to classical Risk. However, defending players may defend their territories using an 8-sided die instead of a 6-sided die if a commander is present in that territory. If two commanders are present in a defending territory, the defender may substitute both of the 6-sided dice used in defense for two 8-sided dice. This is true regardless of commander type for defending.

Substitution of 6-sided dice with 8-sided dice for invading players is contingent on the type of territory that player is invading into/from and the type of commander that player is invading into. The following table is provided in the Risk 2210 A.D. Gameplay Manual.

Commander	Roll 8-sided die when attacking
Diplomat	Never
Land	When invading from or into a land territory
Naval	When invading from or into a water territory
Space	When invading from or into a lunar territory
Nuclear	Always
Tech (Frontline Expansion 2)	Never

Players do not have to remove commanders if they suffer a loss while using an 8-sided die. Players may remove MODs from their corresponding invading or defending territories first. Commanders are removed from a defending player if an invading player destroys all MODs in an defending player's territory. Commanders may be repurchased.

All units in space stations, regardless of type, defend with 8-sided dice. If a territory with a space station is captured by an invading player, that space station is replaced with another of the invading player's same color.

Similar to classic Risk, if an invading player captured three or more contested territories, territories defended by another player, the invading player receives one energy and one commander card. Commander cards received this way can only be chosen from Commanders that the invading player currently has in play.

=== Fortifying ===
A player may end their turn by fortifying. To fortify, players move as many units as they desire from one territory, and only one territory, to another territory that is connected at all points by territories that player occupies. Players need not own a space or naval commander to fortify into lunar or water territories. However, to fortify from a territory on the Earth game board to a territory on the Moon game board, one of the connected territories must be a space station.

== Prominent differences from classic Risk ==
- Only five players (classic Risk seats six)
- Addition of water and moon territories
- Addition of commanders (land, naval, space, nuclear, diplomat)
- Command card decks corresponding to each of the five commanders
- Players earn and spend "energy" to obtain commanders, cards, and space stations and to activate some command cards
- Players can roll an 8-sided die in some instances
- Armies are not acquired through card trading
- The game is only 5 years (turns) long; the winner is the player with highest score at the end of the last year
- Players bid energy to determine turn order rather than following the same order determined by a dice from the beginning of the game.

=== Territories ===
Geographically, the map is nearly identical to the classic Risk map. It has the same forty-two territories as before, but they have somewhat different names; Greenland, for example, is now the Exiled States of America. There is a tendency for large territories to be given the name of a present-day small state (Andorra, Djibouti, and Lesotho). Additionally, a few connections are removed from the Earth board that are present in classic Risk board; the picture shows that Egypt is the only African country to have a connection with Middle East.

Thirteen water territories divided into five colonies and fourteen lunar territories divided into three colonies have been added. Similar to continental bonuses, if a player controls all the territories in a lunar or water colony at the beginning of their turn, they will receive additional MODs and energy that turn.

The map changes each game: Before any units are placed, four Devastation markers are positioned randomly on the board. Those four territories are nuclear wastelands that are impassable and uninhabitable during the game.

=== Commanders and cards ===
One of the biggest differences from classic Risk is the addition of commanders: land, naval, space, nuclear, and diplomat. These fill a number of roles. Card play can shift the balance of power rapidly. Players can only buy four cards at a time, and only for commanders in play. Like the new avenues of movement, cards open up the board by making no position impregnable, no attack a certainty. With cards in use, the game is more fluid and positions are constantly shifting. There is a separate deck of cards for each type of commander. Perhaps the most devastating card attacks are enabled by the nuclear commander: Playing a nuclear card has the potential to destroy all the armies on an entire continent.

=== Energy ===
Energy also has a strategic importance. It is used to buy cards, to bring commanders and space stations into play, to bid for the most advantageous place in the turn order, and to play certain cards. Each round, players bid energy for the right to choose when they want to take their turns. But players who spend too much energy one turn may find themselves playing at a disadvantage the next turn, or even for the rest of the game.

=== Turn limit ===
Risk 2210 A.D. includes a five-turn limit, although it is possible to play as in normal Risk with unlimited turns. Whoever controls the most territories (and bonuses) at the end of the fifth year wins.

The game includes the necessary equipment and cards for playing the classic version of Risk.

== Revised map versions ==
The first printing of the game included a board based on the original Risk board, but it does not contain the US Pacific regions, and has different oceanic connections. In more recent game boards, the connection between East Africa and the Middle East has been removed, which is similar to the changes made for the 40th Anniversary version of Risk. Note: there does not appear to be a bridge between the Exiled States of America and Canada on the actual artwork. Territories renamed in the edition with ISBN 978-0-7430-0764-8 are shown in quotes.

North America

1. Aleutian Empire "Northwestern Oil Emirate"
2. Alberta
3. Mexitlopoctli "Mexico"
4. American Republic
5. Exiled States of America
6. Nunavut
7. Canada
8. République du Québec
9. Continental Biospheres

South America

1. Argentina
2. Amazon Desert
3. Andean Nations
4. Nuevo Timoto

Europe

1. New Avalon
2. Iceland GRC (Genetic Research Center)
3. Warsaw Republic
4. Jotenheim
5. Imperial Balkania
6. Ukrayina
7. Andorra

Africa

1. Zaire Military Zone
2. Ministry of Djibouti
3. Egypt
4. Madagascar
5. Saharan Empire
6. Lesotho

Antarctica

1. Free Afrikaans Republic
2. Shackleton
3. Independent Kansas
4. Southern Anarchist Control Zone

Asia

1. Afghanistan
2. Hong Kong
3. United Indiastan
4. Alden
5. Japan
6. Pevek
7. Middle East
8. Khan Industrial State
9. Angkhor Wat
10. Siberia
11. Enclave of the Bear
12. Sakha

Australia

1. Australian Testing Ground
2. Java Cartel
3. New Guinea
4. Aboriginal League

US Pacific

1. Poseidon
2. Hawaiian Preserve
3. New Atlantis

Asia Pacific

1. Sung Tzu
2. Neo Tokyo

Southern Atlantic

1. The Ivory Reef
2. Neo Paulo

Northern Atlantic

1. Nova Brasilia
2. New York City
3. Western Ireland

Indian

1. South Ceylon
2. Microcorp
3. Akara

There is also a moon map board used in Risk 2210 A.D., with fourteen territories divided into three colonies.

Cresinion

1. Harpalus
2. Sea of Rains
3. Ocean of Storms
4. Bay of Dew

Delphot

1. Aristotle
2. Sea of Serenity
3. Sea of Crisis
4. Sea of Nectar

Sajon

1. Rhaeticus
2. Byrgius (crater)
3. Sea of Clouds
4. Straight Wall
5. Marsh of Diseases
6. Tycho

== Expansions ==
Avalon Hill has released a number of expansions for the 2210 A.D. game. Used as Tournament awards, these expansions were originally available only to retailers and have not been released commercially. To date, there are four "official" expansions, under the name "Frontline". A number of unofficial expansions have also been created by fans, covering such themes as terrorism, aerial assault, zombies, Antarctica and Godstorm-style relics

List of official Expansions:

- Frontline season one, Mars Expansion: The Mars Expansion introduces a newly terraformed Mars as a playable battlefield, featuring its own territories and unique strategic opportunities. Players can deploy forces to Mars, gaining access to new routes and resources that influence the global conflict.
- Frontline season two, Tech Commander: The Tech Commander Expansion adds a sixth commander type, the Tech Commander, alongside a new 20-card deck. This expansion enhances technological advancements, providing powerful upgrades and special abilities that can alter the course of battle.
- Frontline season three, Factions: The Factions Expansion introduces six distinct factions, each with unique abilities and starting conditions. This addition increases replayability and strategic depth, as players must adapt to their faction’s strengths and weaknesses.
- Frontline season four, Invasion of the Giant Amoebas: The Invasion of the Giant Amoebas expansion adds a new threat to the battlefield. Giant amoebas act as a neutral force, spreading across the map and disrupting player plans. This unpredictable element forces players to adapt their strategies to survive and conquer.

== Video game version ==
A video game version of Risk 2210 A.D. called Invade Earth was created by Jonathan Crosmer using Java. It also allowed users to play the original Risk, Risk: Godstorm and a few other variations of the game. Players could also network across the Internet to play with others. Invade Earth ceased to function in February 2018 due to security updates to Java.

== Reception ==
The game has been reviewed in an entry for The Encyclopedia of Science Fiction, with the reviewer noting that it is "an excellent example of a game that is easy to learn and hard to master" and that the game is "more fluid than the original Risk; no position is impregnable, and no strategy is optimal". The Wargamer said the game is "not a rehash of an old classic" and it's rather "an innovative breakthrough in simple, multi-player family-style wargaming".

== Reviews ==
- Syfy

== See also ==
- List of licensed Risk game boards
- Risk
- Risk Godstorm, a mythical-setting variant of Risk that followed Risk 2210 A.D.
