= Warriors of the Green Planet Trilogy =

Tabletop game series

The Warriors of the Green Planet Trilogy was a series of three games published in 1976 by Fact and Fantasy Games.

== Games ==
- Mind War
- War of the Sky Galleons
- Warriors of the Green Planet

== Reception ==
Lewis Pulsipher reviewed The Green Planet Trilogy for White Dwarf #2, and stated that "The Green Planet games are workmanlike representatives of non-historical wargames. Mind War is a waste but the other two have good points that will appeal to certain players, generally naval game fans for Sky Galleons and tactical fans for Warriors, and for those who like extended multi-arm strategic campaigns, a combination of the last two."

W. G. Armintrout reviewed the Warriors of the Green Planet Trilogy in The Space Gamer No. 27. Armintrout commented that "all three are stand-alone games. Combining them is a waste of time. Don't buy these under the impression that you'll get more play per dollar by putting them all together."
