= Risk (1988 video game) =

- Developers: Gang of Five; Sculptured Software (Genesis); Zoë Mode (PS4, XONE, PS3, X360)
- Publishers: Virgin Interactive; Parker Brothers; Electronic Arts; Ubisoft (PS4, XONE, PS3, X360)
- Platforms: Amiga, Apple II, Atari ST, BlackBerry, Commodore 64, MS-DOS, iOS, Classic Mac OS, Windows, PlayStation 3, PlayStation 4, Genesis, Windows Mobile, Xbox 360, Xbox One
- Release: Commodore 64: EU: 1988; Mac: NA: 1989; Amiga: EU: 1990; Genesis: NA: 1994; Windows: NA: January 1997; Windows Mobile: NA: February 28, 2009; BlackBerry: NA: August 20, 2009; iOS: NA: July 16, 2010; PS4, Xbox One: WW: February 3, 2015; PS3, Xbox 360: WW: April 29, 2015
- Genre: Turn-based strategy
- Modes: Single-player, multiplayer

Risk is a turn-based strategy video game based on the board game of the same name.

== Gameplay ==
The player can select as many as five computer opponents. The player can play either the British or American version of the game, including the extra armies cards.

== Reception ==
Computer Gaming World stated that while the computer version offered the convenience of an automated opponent for solitary players, the board game would likely be more fun for most because they would not have to crowd around the computer, which could not easily display the entire world at once.

The game was reviewed in 1990 in Dragon #156 by Hartley, Patricia, and Kirk Lesser in "The Role of Computers" column. The reviewers gave the game 5 out of 5 stars.
