= Lux (video game) =

2002 video game

- Developer: Sillysoft Games
- Publisher: Sillysoft Games
- Platforms: Windows, Linux, iPhone, Mac
- Release: 1.0 - November 25, 2002; 2.0 - May 20, 2003; 3.0 - August 22, 2003; 4.0 - July 22, 2004; 5.0 - May 11th, 2005; 5.5 - September 16, 2006; 5.7 - November 22, 2007; 6.0 - August 25, 2009
- Genre: Strategy
- Modes: Single player, Multiplayer

Lux is a series of turn-based strategy computer games, inspired by the rule system of the board game Risk but expanding it to function on any map made up of a graph of countries and the connections between them. Lux was developed and self-published by developer Sillysoft Games. The user community has been active in growing Lux. Users can create maps and computer AIs for Lux, and submit them to be included in the official plugin manager.

== Gameplay ==
Lux Delux is a Risk-style clone with generally similar rules to the original. Up to six players can play at once, and any empty spot in the game is filled up by "bots," or computer AI personalities. Lux has over 900 maps, each varying in size, shape, and complexity. Regardless of the map, the objective of the game is the same: eliminate all other players so only one remains. Players play for "Raw," which is awarded or taken away for winning or losing games. These games are recorded, and the player with the most Raw at the end of the week is awarded a virtual medal. Aside from the weekly medals, players compete for the best seed, the calculation of a player's best weekly ranking. Awards are distributed on a player's rankings page, along with win percentage, games, and more.

Like Risk, winning in Lux requires both skill and luck, with every attack hanging on the result of a dice roll. However, in spite of the randomness there exists a regular group of players who dominate the multiplayer rankings. Like many online turn-based board games, Lux includes a chat capability, allowing conversation, tactical discussions, offers of alliance, etc., and some players use this as a political tool in their play to great advantage.

The ranking system is very competitive, and has evolved into a two-tiered system where each player has a score in the current week, as well as a seeded place depending on the last 16 weeks of play. The online player base is relatively small (about 700 regular online players), but many of them are fairly dedicated.

=== AI opponents ===
A much greater number of users play the game off-line with computer AI opponents. The AI players play by the same rules and are subject to the same game-play limitations as human players, that is, they cannot cheat. About half of these "bots" were programmed by members of the community, and they have evolved to employ sophisticated strategies, such as recognizing players who target them, cooperation, and the imitation of other bots' behavior. Some also respond to text chat, and human responses to them can influence their choice of tactics. The bots sometimes receive respectable rankings for their online play.

=== Maps ===
The original maps are numerous and varied, and most of them are made and submitted by players. Some maps are based on historic battles or wars (e.g., there is a map of the Vietnam War), and others are fantasy realms, inspired by other board games (such as "Monopoluxy," or "Scrabblux"), or are simply geometric shapes. In addition, the coding allows for one-way connections on a map, meaning a particular "country" may be able to attack another, but not the other way around, which allows for unique strategies.

In addition to specific maps, there are also map generators, which give the player a random set of countries and continents as opposed to a set map.

=== Starting scenarios ===
Maps feature what is called a starting scenario. When this option is on, players get a set number of troops and income in a location predetermined by the map's creator.

== Community ==
Lux has a small community, with a few hundred players playing online at any given time, and an unknown number playing offline with bots. Currently, this community is moderated by six "mods," and the owner, Dustin. There are very few rules which players have to follow, most of which are along the lines of "Keep your language appropriate for a friendly board game."

=== Forums ===
Sillysoft hosts a Lux Delux forum, where old and new players can get a jump on special tournaments, and other Lux-related news. The same moderators who moderate the forums also moderate the online gameplay.

=== Special tournaments ===
Lux hosts several special tournaments throughout the year, many of them annual. Some of these tournaments include "The Last Ninja" tournament, the "Castles Tournament", the "Easter Egg Hunt", and the largest tournament, "Luxtoberfest". Luxtoberfest is a month-long festival in October, with different events, special maps, games, and awards on both the forums and the actual game itself.

== Reception and awards ==
Lux Delux was a finalist in the 2005 Independent Games Festival awards contest. The user community has been active in growing Lux. In February 2009 wired.com readers voted Lux Touch the #1 iPhone game. Lux currently holds a four and a half out of five star rating on Totaldiplomacy.com Lux got mixed to good reviews, with many praising the community and the huge selection of maps.

== Sequels ==
Sillysoft released two standalone games based on the Lux game engine in 2006. They both consist of a single-player campaign through a set of historical maps. In the first game, American History Lux, the user is limited to playing the American positions in wars from the French and Indian to the Gulf War. In the second game, Ancient Empires Lux, players can play as any faction in the history of 12 ancient empires from Sumer to the Roman Empire. These games come with some historical information for each level, with links to Wikipedia articles for further information.

In December 2008, Lux debuted for the Apple iPhone in the form of Lux Touch (a free version) and Lux DLX (paid).

In December 2014, Lux debuted for the Android platform in the form of Lux DLX (a free ad supported).

Lux was greenlit on Steam in January 2015 and released the following May, after a two-year campaign.

Sillysoft's follow-up game Lux Alliance was also greenlit on Steam and scheduled to release there in June 2017.
