= Starwars (board game) =

1977 board wargame

Starwars is a 1977 board wargame published by Gamma Two Games.

== Gameplay ==
Starwars is an abstract wargame in which the inhabitants of the Sol and Vega star systems use their starships to take control of each other's home system.

== Reception ==
Norman S. Howe reviewed Starwars in The Space Gamer No. 16. Howe reviewed both UFO and Starwars and commented that "They are attractively packaged and illustrated, and are made of sturdy materials. These are ideal games to play when you are too dazed to continue with War in the Pacific, or can't bear the sound of the pencils in Stellar Conquest."
