= Mind War (board game) =

Mind War is a 1976 board wargame published by Fact and Fantasy Games.

== Gameplay ==
Mind War is a game in which future psionic warriors engage in mental battle.

Mind War is the first game in the Warriors of the Green Planet Trilogy.

== Reception ==
Lewis Pulsipher reviewed The Green Planet Trilogy for White Dwarf #2, and stated that "This game is the weak sister of the trilogy [...] Its connection with the amalgamated supergame is tenous [sic] enough to make it expendable, and by itself it offer little."

Michael Striley reviewed Mind War in The Space Gamer No. 21. Striley commented that "Mind War is simple to learn, fast moving, and can generally be played in less than an hour, much like Metagaming's MicroGames."

W. G. Armintrout reviewed the Warriors of the Green Planet Trilogy in The Space Gamer No. 27, and commented that "Mind War is forgettable."
