= Atlantis - 12500 B.C. =

Board game

Atlantis - 12500 B.C. is a 1976 board wargame published by Excalibre Games Inc.

== Gameplay ==
Atlantis - 12500 B.C. is a science fiction and fantasy game in which people in a mythological and ancient setting fight with futuristic weaponry.

== Reception ==
Tracy Harms reviewed Atlantis - 12500 B.C. in The Space Gamer No. 16. Harms commented that "The ultimate failing of an incomplete rules system is not in the basics of play, but in the nature of intense competition in wargaming."

David Ritchie reviewed Atlantis: 12,500 B.C. in Ares Magazine #1, rating it a 1 out of 9. Ritchie commented that "The rules are so sketchy as to be non-existent and, if it weren't for the fact that this regurgitation of low-grade pulpdom's worst sins is so unintentionally funny, the game would long ago have been confiscated by the Surgeon-General as hazardous to our mental health. By all means, do throw your money away on this."
