= War of the Sky Galleons =

Board game

War of the Sky Galleons is a 1976 board wargame published by Fact and Fantasy Games.

== Gameplay ==
War of the Sky Galleons is one of the games in the Warriors of the Green Planet Trilogy, focusing on aerial warfare while the other games cover land and psionic combat respectively.

== Reception ==
Steve List reviewed War of the Sky Galleons in The Space Gamer No. 11. List concluded that "For those who can swallow the 'science' fiction background and overlook the absurd engineering it postulates, this can be a highly enjoyable game."

Lewis Pulsipher reviewed The Green Planet Trilogy for White Dwarf #2, and stated that "It is difficult to believe that SG represents anything that could actually happen. This is the case if one ignores the ridiculous cover art and the title – Sky Galleons indeed!"

W. G. Armintrout reviewed the Warriors of the Green Planet Trilogy in The Space Gamer No. 27, and commented that "War of the Sky Galleons is pretty stupid, but still a lot of fun."
