= Realpolitik (game) =

Play-by-mail fantasy wargame

- Publishers: Triad Simulations
- Genres: fantasy wargame
- Languages: English
- Players: 12
- Playing time: Fixed
- Materials required: Instructions, order sheets, turn results, paper, pencil
- Media type: Play-by-mail

Realpolitik is a closed-ended, computer moderated, play-by-mail (PBM) fantasy wargame. It was published by Karl Zeimettz in the US and Triad Simulations in the UK Similar to Risk, the game pitted 12 players against each other in a struggle for world domination. Combat, economics, and diplomacy were gameplay elements. The game received generally mixed reviews in gaming magazines in the early 1990s.

== History and development ==
Realpolitik was a fantasy wargame published by Karl Zeimettz of Triad Simulations in Bloomington, Illinois.

== Gameplay ==
Reviewers Mark Macagnone and Chris Daley compared the game to an advanced version of Risk. Each game has 12 players vying for world domination. The game map of the world comprises land and sea areas with 136 land territories. Playable countries included Argentina, Algeria, Australia, China, Egypt, Germany, India, Russia, South Africa, Turkey, the United States, and Venezuela. Players controlled various types of forces, including land, naval, air, and space units. Besides combat, economics, and diplomacy were game elements. Victory was achieved by controlling a large percentage of terrain, a larger requirement for an alliance than an individual.

== Reception ==
Mark Macagnone reviewed the game in the March–April 1991 issue of Paper Mayhem. He rated it 4 out of 5 stars for Activity Between Players and Complexity, 3.5 for the Rulebook, 4.5 for Playability, 5 for Gamemaster Response and Fun Index, and an overall rating of 5 stars. Chris Daley reviewed the game in the November–December 1993 issue of Flagship. He noted ease of play and gamemaster response as positives. Negatives included the air system, lack of unit character, and the need for diplomacy, challenges with the program, and issues with overseas movement which isolated Australia in the game. The game was rated at No. 28 of 82 games in the September–October 1991 issue of Paper Mayhem.

== See also ==
- List of play-by-mail games

== Bibliography ==
- Daley, Chris (November–December 1993). "Advanced Risk, Er, Not Really: A Review of Realpolitik". Flagship. No. 46. pp. 45, 47.
- Editors (September–October 1991). "PBM Game Ratings as of 7–14–91". Paper Mayhem. No. 50. pp. 54–55.
- Macagnone, Mark (March–April 1991). "Realpolitik: A Review". Paper Mayhem. No. 46. pp. 13–14.
