= Warriors of the Green Planet (board game) =

Board wargame

Warriors of the Green Planet is a 1976 board wargame published by Fact and Fantasy Games.

== Gameplay ==
Warriors of the Green Planet is the third game in the Warriors of the Green Planet Trilogy and uses rules for futuristic ground combat.

== Reception ==
Lewis Pulsipher reviewed The Green Planet Trilogy for White Dwarf #2, and stated that "Warriors manifests a peculiarity of the designer's view of warfare which is exhibited to much worse effect in Siege of Minas Tirith – cavalry are merely fast infantry."

W. G. Armintrout reviewed Warriors of the Green Planet as part of the trilogy in The Space Gamer No. 27. Armintrout commented that "Warriors of the Green Planet is a challenging game of post-holocaust combat."
