= Risk Godstorm =

Board game

- Designers: Mike Selinker; Richard Baker; Michael Donais; Bill McQuillan
- Illustrators: Rob Lazzaretti; Dennis Kauth; Greg Staples; Arnie Swekel; Lars Grant-West; Abigail Fein
- Publishers: Avalon Hill
- Publication: 2004; 22 years ago
- Genres: Board game
- Languages: English
- Series: Risk
- Players: 2–5
- Playing time: 240'
- Chance: Medium
- Age range: 10+
- Skills: Strategic thought

Risk Godstorm is a Risk variant board game published by Avalon Hill in 2004 and designed by Mike Selinker with developers Richard Baker and Michael Donais. The cultures of the Celts, Norse, Greeks, Egyptians, and Babylonians clash for supremacy of the ancient world. Players invade territories, play miracle cards, sink Atlantis, and conquer the underworld. The latter is a significant addition to the Risk series, as soldiers do not leave the game when they are killed, but instead go to their heavens and then embark to take over the underworld.

== Versions ==
Godstorm was the second Risk game published by Avalon Hill, following Risk 2210 A.D. Selinker wrote several articles upon its release in 2004 to explain the development process and philosophy. It is based on both Risk and 2210 A.D.; without the special Miracle cards and deities, the same equipment can be used with the classic Risk rules on the Godstorm game board.

In October 2024, Renegade Game Studios reissued the board game. The new edition of Risk: Godstorm has minimal changes compared to the 2004 version published by Hasbro.

== Equipment ==
In addition to the rulebook and two gameboards of Ancient Earth and the Underworld, the game includes:

- 5 pantheon cards (Babylonia, Celt, Egypt, Greece, Norse)
- 60 soldier and 10 war elephant figures for each culture
- 4 deity figures (1 god of war, 1 goddess of magic, 1 god of sky, and 1 god of death) for each culture
- 66 Miracle cards (17 war, 15 magic, 17 sky, and 17 death)
- 44 Territory cards (including 2 wild cards)
- 60 faith tokens (50× 1-point, 10× 5-point)
- Several markers for epoch, turn order, plagues, sunken Atlantis, and maelstrom

=== Gods ===
Each player has a pantheon of four gods to bring onto the ancient world map, to whom the game ascribes the spheres of the Sky, War, Death and Magic. Gods can only exist on the main map; they cannot exist in the heaven or the Underworld. Each sphere has a different effect on the game.

Pantheons and other characteristics of Risk Godstorm cultures
Sphere Culture	Sky	War	Death	Magic	Army color	Heaven
Babylonian	Marduk	Gilgamesh	Druaga	Ishtar	Blue	Kurnugia
Celt	Lugh	Nuada	Arawn	Brigid	Green	Avalon
Egypt	Ra	Set	Osiris	Isis	Tan	Duat
Greek	Zeus	Ares	Hades	Hecate	Plum	Elysium
Norse	Odin	Thor	Loki	Freya	Reddish-brown	Valhalla

==== Sky ====
A God of the Sky will add an additional die to its players roll when competing in a Godswar. Players destroying at least one god during a turn can draw a miracle card from the sky deck. Sky cards are defensive cards that are activated on other players' turns.

==== War ====
If the attacking army possesses the God of War, then the attacker will win ties. Players conquering three or more territories during a turn and possessing a God of War on the map can draw a miracle card from the war deck. War cards are cheap offensive cards that can be used on the players' turn.

==== Death ====
Normally, when a battalion is killed in battle, it will travel to its respective heaven and then progress into the Underworld. However, if the attacking army possesses a God of Death, all troops killed are placed back in their respective player's pool. Players controlling a crypt in the Underworld at the end of their turn can draw a miracle card from the death deck. Death cards are expensive to activate, but for the most part have devastating effects.

==== Magic ====
Players with a Goddess of Magic in their army allow them to re-roll ones -- whether they are attacking or defending. Players rolling three of the same number and having a God of Magic under their control can draw a miracle card from the magic deck. These cards are also known as 'relics' and are played as soon as they are drawn, staying in play until they are destroyed by another card's effect.

=== The Map ===
==== The World ====
Schematic map of Risk Godstorm

The ancient world map was drawn by cartographer Rob Lazzaretti and contains the following continents, each subdivided into multiple territories:

- Germania, which contains Hibernia, Caledonia, Anglia, Thule, Varangia, Galicia, Alemannia, Gaul, and Iberia.
- Hyrkania, which contains Rus, Scythia, Cimmeria, and Sarmatia.
- Europa, which contains Liguria, Dalmatia, Dacia, Thracia, Roma, Apulia, Corsica, Sicilia, Graecia, Minoa, Ionia, and Anatolia.
- Asia Minor, which contains Phoenicia, Assyria, Parthia, Sumer, Babylon, and Sheba.
- Africa, which contains Atlas, Carthage, Gaitulia, Cyrenaica, Nubia, Egypt, and Kush.
- Atlantis, which contains the fictional territories of Hesperide, Poseidonis, Tritonis, and Oricalcos.

Although completely occupying the continent of Atlantis provides a higher bonus than Hyrkania, the other four-territory continent, one of the Miracle cards will cause Atlantis to sink, instantly removing all the occupying armies, gods, and temples.

==== The Underworld ====
Schematic map of the underworld; heavens not shown

The underworld is a side board drawn by Dennis Kauth. When soldiers die on the main map, they are removed to the culture's heaven which are arrayed around the underworld board:

- Kurnugia for the Babylonians.
- Avalon for the Celts.
- Duat for the Egyptians.
- Elysium for the Greeks.
- Valhalla for the Norse.

During a player's turn, they may enter the underworld from their heaven through any one of the three spaces marked with a (G)ate, or any underworld space already controlled by that player. Controlling (A)ltar and (C)rypt spaces in the underworld yield additional gameplay bonuses on the regular map.

== Gameplay ==
=== Setup ===
The wild cards are removed from the Territory deck. The Miracle and Territory cards are separated into five piles (four piles for each Miracle category), separately shuffled, and placed face-down. The top four Territory cards are turned over and plague markers are placed on the map in each of these territories; any army that conquers and enters a plague territory immediately loses half its strength, rounded down, and accompanying god(s) are banished.

Each player chooses a pantheon by random draw: each player rolls one die and then draws a pantheon card, in descending order of the roll. Depending on the number of players, each player receives 25 to 35 armies to start the game. Either the remaining territory cards are dealt to assign territories, or players may take turns distributing their armies in an unoccupied territory, one at a time, in the same order as the pantheon selection die roll.

== Reviews ==
- Syfy
