= Risk (1996 video game) =

1996 turn-based strategy video game

- Developers: BlueSky Software; NMS Software; Runecraft (PlayStation)
- Publisher: Hasbro Interactive
- Platforms: PC, PlayStation
- Release: NA: November 26, 1996; PlayStation: EU: December 1997; NA: May 31, 1998
- Genre: Turn-based strategy

Risk is a turn-based strategy video game based on the board game of the same name, released for PCs in 1996 by Hasbro Interactive. A PlayStation port followed in 1998.

== Gameplay ==
Risk includes both a simulation of the original board game and a new variation on the game called "Ultimate Risk", which does not use dice but rather implements the use of forts, generals, terrain, and weather effects. The simulation game is for up to eight players, allows the setting of house rules, and includes several boards to play on in addition to the original.

== Reception ==
Reception

Review scores
Publication	Score
Computer Gaming World	5/5
Next Generation	2/5 (PS)
PC Gamer (UK)	68%
PC PowerPlay	84%
PC Zone	82/100

Next Generation reported that Risk sold "exceptionally well" during 1997.

In Computer Gaming World, Terry Coleman called Risk an improvement over previous computer adaptations of the board game, and wrote that "in some ways, Risk even outshines Monopoly CD-ROM on the computer." He praised its Classic Risk mode, and hailed Ultimate Risk as "a superb enhancement to a classic game." Reviewing the game for PC Zone, Chris Anderson wrote, "Hasbro have taken a classic board-game, put it on pc, and brought lots of new features to it, and I for one enjoyed it. It's addictive, highly replayable, and it looks quite smart too. If it had real-time combat we would have been talking a 90+ score".

PC Gamer UK's Mark Donald criticized Risk's artificial intelligence for failing to recreate the experience of board game play, but called it "a moderately enjoyable game" overall.

Next Generation reviewed the PlayStation version of the game, rating it two stars out of five, and stated that "For Risk fanatics who sometimes have trouble convening games with human opponents, this is a decently satisfying quick fix, as you can play against several computer players. But for anyone else, it's an unexciting, uninspiring, unimpressive interpretation of a classic game."

The game was a finalist for Computer Gaming World's 1996 "Classic/Puzzle Game of the Year" award, which ultimately went to Baku Baku Animal.
