= Starship & Empire =

- Designers: Joseph L. Roti
- Publishers: R-Squared Games
- Publication: 1976; 49 years ago
- Players: 2–4
- Playing time: 340 minutes

Starship & Empire is a 1976 board wargame published by R-Squared Games.

== Gameplay ==
Starship & Empire is a wargame that involves strategic maneuvering of fleets in a pseudo-3D environment for tactical combat purposes.

== Reception ==
Kevin P. Kenney reviewed Starship & Empire in The Space Gamer No. 7. He described the game as "a multi-level combination of many of the ideas present in other S-F games cleaned up and merged into one of the better of the current onslaught of space/naval wargames".
