= Rift Trooper =

Board game

- Designers: Richard Bartucci
- Publishers: Attack Wargaming Association
- Publication: July 1976; 49 years ago
- Genres: War game
- Players: 2
- Playing time: 15-30 minutes
- Age range: 12+

Rift Trooper is a 1976 two player board wargame designed by Richard Bartucci and published by Attack Wargaming Association (AWA). It includes three tactical simulations of the science fiction novel Starship Troopers; "Squad Sweep", "Operation Royalty", and "Encounter".

== Gameplay ==
Rift Trooper is played on a hex map, with the map design and alien enemies dependant on the simulation. For each scenario, one player plays as a team of Terran Mobile Infantry and the other as one of three different alien races—humanoids known as Skinnies, arachnid monsters called Bugs, or reptilian warriors known as Thoarks. Each soldier has a separate range, attack factor, defence factor and movement capability depending on their equipment.

Players can move by either walking one hex at a time or by jumping straight ahead four hexes. On their turn, players can either attack by shooting, which is limited to a range, or with a nuclear missile that can hit any circle of a six hex radius on the board, although each player only has two per team. Damage done is determined by cross indexing a die roll with the number of hexes between the attacker and their target.

=== Squad Sweep ===
The Squad Sweep simulation has the Terran forces raiding a Skinny town. Before starting, the Skinny player visibly places all their soldiers and weaponry on the map in buildings, out in the streets, or on rooftops. Attacking different kinds of buildings gives the Terran player a different number of points, but the attacking trooper must be adjacent to building to do damage. The Terran player has to destroy 13 points worth of Skinny buildings to win, and the Skinny player must wipe out all ten Terran soldiers.

=== Operation Royalty ===
The Operation Royalty simulation is the longest Rift Trooper simulation, in which Terran forces descend into the Bug tunnels to capture or kill the Arachnid leaders and gain information. The number the Terran player are able to capture or are forced to kill determines the degree of victory. Unlike Squad Sweep, the positions of Bugs in the tunnels are not marked by counters, but are instead recorded by the Bug player using a coordinate system. If a Terran soldier passes within one hex of any of the hidden Bugs, or if they move, they are then marked by a counter for the rest of the game.

=== Encounter ===
In the Encounter simulation, two Terran squads are involved in a firefight with a single Thoark squad. The winner is the player who destroys the most enemy units.

== Reception ==
Robert C. Kirk reviewed Rift Trooper in The Space Gamer No. 11, concluding that "It is a good quality, professionally printed game -- but it is clumsy to play." Richard Berg, in a short review for Moves No. 31, expressed similar distaste for the game, writing that "the designer thought that three separate maps would dress up some shoddily constructed scenarios. They didn't." In a review in The Playboy Winner's Guide to Board Games, Jon Freeman stated simply of the game that he believed "Rift Trooper is poorly done".
