= Bay of Pigs (game) =

Board wargame published in 1976

Original cover, 1976

Bay of Pigs is a board wargame designed and published by Jim Bumpas in 1976 that simulates the CIA-backed invasion of Cuba in 1961 that planned to overthrow the regime of Fidel Castro.

== Background ==
In 1958, forces under Fidel Castro successfully overthrew the Cuban dictator Carlos Prio. Castro subsequently installed a Communist government, nationalized American businesses, cut off ties to the United States and reached out to the Soviet Union. Anti-Castro Cubans who had fled, with American financial aid, led an attempted invasion of Cuba at the Bay of Pigs.

== Contents ==
Bay of Pigs is a two-player game in which one player controls the invading anti-Castro forces, and the other player controls the F.A.R. (pro-Castro defenders). The rules cover sea transport, amphibious and airborne landings, supply issues, and air combat, as well as air and naval bombardment. The paper hex grid map is scaled at 1 km per hex, and each game turn six hours of game time.

== Publication history ==
Game designer Jim Bumpas had successfully designed two wargames in 1975, Schutztruppe and Jerusalem! The following year, the 15th anniversary of the Bay of Pigs invasion, Bumpas self-published a wargame that simulated the attempted invasion. Bumpas made no secret of where his sympathies lay, dedicating the game to the 15th anniversary of "the successful Cuban defence", and noting that the invading force "has no chance to defeat the forces of the F.A.R."

== Reception ==
In the 1977 book The Comprehensive Guide to Board Wargaming, Nicholas Palmer described the game as "Fairly easy to play and fast-moving."

In Issue 28 of Moves, Richard Berg thought there were plenty of new ideas in Bay of Pigs, but was "not too sure whether some of these ideas should appear in a game." Berg found the self-published game "fairly well done and relatively attractive." He also found the rules to be "fairly standard." He concluded by that "the game plays smoothly and quite quickly", but pointed out that the game was very unbalanced, with almost no chance for the invaders to win.

In The Guide to Simulations/Games for Education and Training, Martin Campion warned teachers thinking of using this game in the classroom that "The rules are rather sketchy, so if you are interested, be prepared to make extemporaneous additions as needed."
