= UFO: Game of Close Encounters =

1976 board wargame

UFO is a 1976 board wargame published by Gamma Two Games.

== Gameplay ==
UFO is a game in which the people of Earth in the near future must defend the planet from invading flying saucers before they land.

== Reception ==
Norman S. Howe reviewed U. F. O. in The Space Gamer No. 16. Howe reviewed both UFO and Starwars and commented that "They are attractively packaged and illustrated, and are made of sturdy materials. These are ideal games to play when you are too dazed to continue with War in the Pacific, or can't bear the sound of the pencils in Stellar Conquest."

== Reviews ==
- The Playboy Winner's Guide to Board Games
