= Dixie (board wargame) =

1976 alternate history board wargame

Dixie, subtitled "The Second War Between the States", is a board wargame designed by Redmond A. Simonsen and published by Simulations Publications, Inc. (SPI) in 1976 that simulates an alternate world where the Union lost the first American Civil War, and there is a second war between the North and the South in the early part of the 20th century.

== Gameplay ==
In this game's setting, after the Confederacy emerged from the American Civil War as an independent country, the North and South have gone to war again in the 1930s. The game itself is a two-player brigade/division-level wargame.

=== Components ===
The game includes:

- 22" x 17" paper map
- four player aid sheets
- rulebook
- 100 die-cut counters
- randomizer chits (to replace dice)

=== Administration points ===
Dixie was the first wargame to use Administration Points as a way of regulating how much can be accomplished in a turn. In each turn, the players are given a certain number of Administration points, and use them to "buy" actions. For example, bringing a replacement infantry division onto the board costs two Administration points.

=== Scenarios ===
The game includes three scenarios set in 1936 and 1937.

== Publication history ==
In 1976, Redmond Simonsen's alternate world wargame Dixie was published as a pull-out game in issue #116 of Strategy & Tactics. SPI also published it as a stand-alone product packaged in a cardstock folio.

== Reception ==
In Issue 13 of JagdPanther, Steve Daniels noted that "The new and novel system of Admin Points has been accepted and rejected by various segments of the hobby, and there is a considerable urge to simply throw them out all together and play the game as you want." Daniels believed that removing Admin Points "certainly livens up the game, though the outcome is brief and bloody." Daniels went on to suggest a game variant involving more units, European intervention and tactical air support.

In Issue 5 of Perfidious Albion, Charles Vasey and Geoff Barnard traded comments about the game. Vasey noted, "This game system is so unusual that it will take a long time to learn properly ... I found this system too abstract to give a realistic feeling." Barnard replied, "I thought that the way the game system required the expenditure of a limited number of [Action Points] for almost all operations... was interesting and seemed to work well. Maybe SPI saw this as an experimental system around which they had to fit a game with little or no historical interest that might distract attention from the system." Vasey concluded, "To succeed, a game with little historical glamour should at least be technically accurate." Barnard concluded, "Personally the game is of almost no interest at all, it is far too artificial to be played for any reason other than for the [Action Point] resource system."

Writing in Ares Magazine #1, Eric Goldberg was not impressed by Dixie, commenting that "it could be titled 'How Not to Design a Wargame'." Goldberg's biggest issues were that both sides start with equal forces, and that the player best able to manage the Administration Points system would win the game despite mediocre gameplay. He concluded by giving Dixie a very poor rating of only 2 out of 9, saying, "one should not waste time or money on Dixie, but students of the history of wargames might be interested to know that the concept of Administrative Points was invented with this game."

In his 1977 book The Comprehensive Guide to Board Wargaming, Nick Palmer thought the idea of redoing the Civil War with 20th century weapons "has a zany appeal", but noted that in a poll conducted by SPI, over two-thirds of the wargamers who took the poll knew this game, but most gave it a negative rating.

Board Game Wizard included Dixie in its list of "Best Board Games of the 70's", saying, "Kind of a weird alternate history really, but some players did enjoy a couple of games, although it didn’t engage that well overall."

== Other reviews and commentary ==
- Moves #61
