= Castle Risk =

Version of the board game Risk

- Players: 2–6
- Setup time: 5–20 minutes
- Playing time: 1–3 hours (player dependent)
- Chance: medium-dice, cards
- Age range: 8+
- Skills: Tactics, Strategy, and Negotiation

Castle Risk is a version of the board game Risk that is played on a map of Europe. It is one of the first variants of Risk, first released as a stand-alone game in Europe by Parker Brothers in 1986; it later appeared on the reverse side of the standard Risk board in a combined version published in 1990. The game never officially was released in the United Kingdom. The Castle Risk map board was reused in another variant, published in 1999 as Risk: Edition Napoleon.

== Map ==
Schematic map of Europe in the game Castle Risk, showing cities, empires, and connections

The map is divided into six empires and three neutral (independent) areas. Each of these is subdivided into smaller territories. A player receives four troops per turn for each empire the player controls and six troops for controlling all the independent areas. A common variation in play is to have each of the neutral regions worth two troops a turn.

Empires:

- French Empire (Paris, Gascony, Netherlands, Brittany, Marseille, Burgundy)
- British Empire (London, Wales, Ireland, Yorkshire, Scotland)
- Russian Empire (Saint Petersburg, Moscow, Livonia, Smolensk, Ukraine, Poland)
- German Empire (Prussia, Berlin, Saxony, Rhine, Bavaria)
- Ottoman Empire (Turkey, Montenegro, Serbia, Romania, Bulgaria, Greece)
- Austrian Empire (Trieste, Galicia, Vienna, Bohemia, Hungary)

Independent territories:

- Italy (Switzerland, Venice, Rome, Naples)
- Spain (Barcelona, Madrid, Portugal)
- Scandinavia (Sweden, Norway, Denmark, Finland)

Some territories are landlocked, which means they cannot be used and accessed with the Admiral's ship when the player holds an Admiral card; however, most territories have a coastline. The territories bordering the Black Sea also have access to the ship, but when used with these territories, the ship can sail only to other territories on the Black Sea.

Empire summary in Castle Risk
Empire	Territories	Neighboring empires	Neighboring independent territories	Sea ports	Landlocked	Comments
Austrian	(5): Trieste, Galicia, Vienna, Bohemia, Hungary	(3): German, Ottoman, Russian	(1): Italy (Switzerland, Venice, Naples)	1	4	Only one sea port
British	(5): London, Wales, Ireland, Yorkshire, Scotland	(1): French	(1): Scandinavia (Norway)	5	0	Isolated, with few access points unless by sea
French	(6): Paris, Gascony, Netherlands, Brittany, Marseille, Burgundy	(2): British, German	(2): Italy (Switzerland, Venice); Spain (Barcelona)	5	1	Controls conventional access to Spain and Great Britain
German	(5): Prussia, Berlin, Saxony, Rhine, Bavaria	(3): Austrian, French, Russian	(2): Italy (Switzerland); Scandinavia (Denmark)	3	2	Three neighboring empires
Ottoman	(6): Turkey, Montenegro, Serbia, Romania, Bulgaria, Greece	(2): Austrian, Russian	(1): Italy (Naples)	3(+3)	1	Has best access to Black Sea and regular sea ports
Russian	(6): Saint Petersburg, Moscow, Livonia, Smolensk, Ukraine, Poland	(3): Austrian, German, Ottoman	(1): Scandinavia (Finland)	2(+1)	3	Has access to Black Sea through Ukraine

== Rules ==
The rules of Castle Risk differ from original Risk in several respects. Each empire has a capital city (of the player's choosing) and once the capital is lost that player is out of the game. In addition, reinforcements are granted at the end of a turn instead of at the beginning (except in the case of the Reinforcements card). This makes fortifying the territory a player has just conquered much easier, but denies that player the opportunity to place the new troops in the best strategic position for the turn about to begin.

Castle Risk introduces specific person cards. The cards allow players to modify dice rolls (General and Marshall), to attack by sea instead of land (Admiral), place extra armies at the start of a turn (Reinforcements), force temporary non-aggression pacts (Diplomats), or to look at another player's cards, discarding one in the process (Spy).

Another new rule is the addition of "hidden armies", which are reinforcements that a player hides in a location of their choosing at the beginning of the game. They can be in any location, including an opponent's territory (except their own or an opponent's capital), which makes them very useful for launching a surprise attack. Hidden armies can only be withdrawn at the beginning of a players' turn and the player must have control of the territory at the start of their turn. Their power, when revealed, is based on the number of reinforcements cards that have already been played.

=== Editions ===
The original edition, published in 1986, included special plastic castle, banner, and Admiral's ship pieces. In the 1990 combined Risk & Castle Risk reissue, these were eliminated; cardboard "castle chips" were used instead of the castles and banners, and the Admiral card itself served as the Admiral's ship. In addition, the 1986 edition had three white dice for attackers and two red dice for defenders; the 1990 reissue reverses those colors, providing three red dice for attackers and two white dice for defenders.

=== Setup ===
Number of starting armies per player in Castle Risk
2	3	4	5	6
40 ea.	35 ea.	30 ea.	25 ea.	20 ea.

The number of armies assigned to each player varies with the number of players participating.

Each player rolls a die and the high roller draws an empire's banner, inserts the banner into a castle, and places the castle on any territory within that empire along with one army marker. The player to the left of the high roller proceeds to draw a banner and places it in a castle, then occupies a territory within that empire using the castle and a single army. Play proceeds to the left until each player has selected an empire.

In the next phase, players take turns occupying one territory with a single army, starting again with the high roller and proceeding to the left, until all territories are occupied. After that, players place five armies at a time on a territory they already occupy until there are no more starting armies. Finally, each player selects a territory to place a hidden army; any territory without a castle can be selected, including those occupied by another player. The name of the territory is written on a slip of paper and placed under the board.

The deck of cards is shuffled and each player is dealt three cards face-down. The leftover cards are placed face-down to form a draw pile.

== Gameplay ==
The first player to take a turn is selected by rolling a die. Once the first player is selected, play proceeds to the left.

On one turn, each player will:

1. Draw enough cards to bring their hand to three cards.
2. Draw one more card (i.e., hold four cards).
3. Play Reinforcement and/or Diplomat card(s), if desired.
4. Attack one or more adjacent territory(ies), if desired.
5. Collect earnings, ending the turn.

=== Cards ===
Each card has a different effect:

Castle Risk cards
Name	Qty.	Action(s)
Reinforcements	12	Reinforcement card(s) must be played before the first attack of a turn. When played, adds additional armies to a territory already occupied. As a Reinforcement card is played, it is placed in sequence along the edge of the board which has the numbers 3 through 14 in sequence. If multiple cards are played, they continue in sequence from the last Reinforcement card played. The number of armies awarded is equal to the sum of the sequence numbers on the board. For example, Player A plays the first Reinforcement card under the number (3) on the edge of the board and is awarded three additional armies. During their turn, Player B plays two Reinforcement cards, lining them up under the next open sequential numbers (4) and (5) on the edge of the board. Player B is awarded 9 (= 4 + 5) additional armies. Player C then plays one Reinforcement card, lining it up under the next sequential number (6) and is awarded 6 additional armies.
General	8	When played (by an attacking player), adds 1 point to the attacking high die roll. Remains active throughout each attack taken that turn, and is returned to the player's hand at the end of the turn, unless the defending player beats the augmented die roll (i.e., rolls a number higher than the attacking high die roll + 1). When the defending player beats the augmented die roll, the attacking player's General card is discarded. Once the General card is discarded, the attacking player may proceed with the attack, or play another General card, if possessed.
Marshall	8	When played (by a defending player), adds 1 point to the defending high die roll. If the defense is successful, the Marshall is returned to the defending player's hand. Otherwise, the Marshall card is discarded.
Diplomat	7	This card must be played before the first attack of the player's turn. When played, this forces a truce between two players, each of which cannot attack the other on their turn. For example, if Player A plays a Diplomat card and selects Player C for a truce, Player A cannot attack Player C during their turn, and when Player C's turn comes around, Player C cannot attack Player A. After both Players A and C have completed their turns, the truce expires. The Diplomat card is not used in a two-player game; they should be discarded and replaced when drawn or dealt into a player's hand.
Spy	7	When played, allows a player to look at another player's cards and select one to be discarded from their hand. The selected card is removed and shown face-up, and the Spy card is discarded. A player may play more than one Spy card in a single hand. If a player uses the Spy card in a defensive manner, both Spy cards are discarded without revealing their hand. For example, if Player A uses the Spy card against Player B, and Player B has a Spy card, Player B may play their Spy card and Player A does not get to look at Player B's cards.
Admiral	6	When played, allows the armies from a player's occupied territory with a coastline to board the Admiral's ship, sail to another player's territory with a coastline, and attack it. The attack must continue until resolved by one of the players losing all their armies. If the attack is unsuccessful and all the (attacking) armies on the ship are lost, the Admiral card is discarded. Otherwise, the remaining armies are moved off the ship into the defeated territory and the Admiral card is returned to the player's hand. Since the Black Sea is land-locked, if a territory is selected with a coastline on the Black Sea, it can only attack other territories bordering the Black Sea. In addition, if the territories are already connected by dotted lines on the game board (for example, Denmark and Sweden), an Admiral card is not required to attack the connected territory.

One edge of the board is lined with numbers in the sequence 3 to 14. As Reinforcements cards are played, they are placed against this edge to keep track of how many cards have been played.

=== Attacks ===
Attacks follow the same rules as Risk: a player may attack an adjacent territory from a territory occupied with at least two armies; the attacker can choose to roll one, two, or three dice, as long as there is one more army than the number of dice rolled: e.g., with two armies, the attacker is limited to one die; with three, they may roll one or two; and with four or more armies in the attacking territory, they may roll one, two, or three dice. The defender may roll one or two dice; similarly, to roll two dice, the defender must have at least two armies in the defending territory. Combat is resolved by comparing the highest pair of dice, one from each side, then the next highest pair (if both the attacker and defender rolled two or more dice); the losing player for each pair removes one army and a tie goes in favor of the defender.

Like Risk, the attacker may choose to discontinue the attack at any point before the attacking armies are reduced to one. If the defender loses all their armies, the attacker must occupy the defeated territory with the same number of armies as the number of dice rolled. At least one army must remain in the attacking territory.

Exceptions specific to Castle Risk include:

- If an attacking player is using the Admiral card, the attack must continue until one side is completely depleted.
- A player who attacks a territory occupied by another player's castle is limited to rolling two attacking dice at most, regardless of the actual number of armies in the attacking territory.

=== Earnings ===
A player is awarded extra armies at the end of each turn according to the territories occupied and banners won; they may distribute the armies to any territory they occupy:

- 4 armies for each complete empire
- 6 armies for occupying all 11 independent territories
- 8 armies for each banner in the player's castle

=== Eliminating other players ===
The territory occupied by a castle is the player's capital, and when all armies in the capital have been defeated, that player is eliminated from the game. As a defense bonus, players attacking a territory with a castle are limited to rolling two dice.

If a player is eliminated, take their castle off the board and move its banner to the victorious attacker's castle. All of the eliminated player's armies are removed and the player who eliminated them redistributes the armies (limited to those already deployed in the victorious player's territories) to the newly vacated territories, one at a time. If the victorious player is unable or chooses not to occupy some territories, the other players redistribute their armies until all territories are occupied. In addition, the victorious player takes up the defeated player's cards and hidden armies.

Brian Walker described an alternative set of rules for Risk in 1990 which incorporated some concepts from Castle Risk. Under this proposal, one country is selected as the headquarters by each player after the initial army placements, and the effect of reinforcements is diminished. The proposed victory conditions state that one player must occupy a predetermined number of headquarters. Walker suggested four, including the player's own home.

=== Hidden armies ===
Each player may reveal their hidden armies once per game, and only when the player occupies that territory. The player must prove that territory was chosen before the game started by showing their slip of paper to the other players. The largest sequential number on the board according to the current count of Reinforcement cards determines the number of armies placed in that territory; for example, if six Reinforcement cards have been played when the hidden armies are revealed, the last Reinforcement card was played against the sequential number (8) and so 8 armies are placed. Once populated, the revealed armies may be used for attack or defense.

== Reviews ==
Keith Veronese called Castle Risk a "failed version" in 2012.

- Games #79
- 1986 Games 100
