= Battle for Andromeda =

1976 board wargame

Conflict for a Trillion Suns!
- Publishers: Taurus
- Publication: 1993; 32 years ago
- Players: 1–6

Battle for Andromeda: Conflict for a Trillion Suns! is a 1976 board wargame published by Taurus Games.

== Gameplay ==
Battle for Andromeda is a spacecraft combat game.

== Reception ==
Steve Jackson reviewed Battle for Andromeda in The Space Gamer No. 11. Jackson concluded that "This game is totally unplayable. It is a disaster. [...] No one should buy this game. It is a perfect example of how NOT to design a game."
