= Risk (game) =

1957 map-based war board game

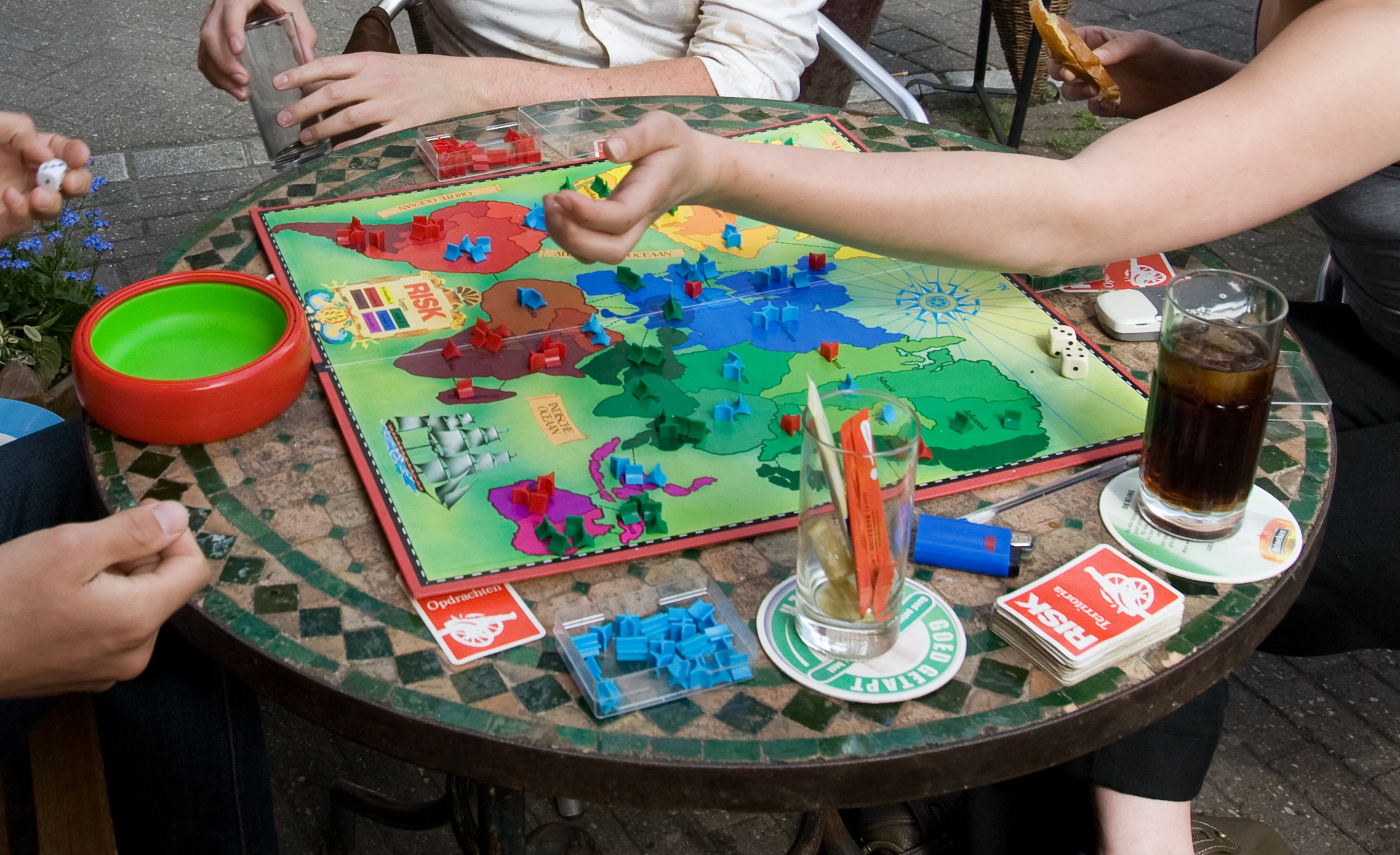
- A game of Risk being played
- Publishers: Hasbro; Winning Moves Games USA
- Years active: 1957–present
- Genres: Strategy game Board game War game
- Players: 2–6
- Setup time: 5–15 minutes
- Playing time: 1–8 hours
- Chance: Medium (5–6 dice, cards)
- Age range: 10+
- Skills: Strategy, tactics, negotiation

Risk is a strategy board game of diplomacy, conflict and conquest for two to six players. The standard version is played on a board depicting a political map of the world, divided into 42 territories, which are grouped into six continents. Turns rotate among players who control armies of playing pieces with which they attempt to capture territories from other players, with results determined by dice rolls. Players may form and dissolve alliances during the course of the game. The goal of the game is to occupy every territory on the board and, in doing so, eliminate the other players. The game can be lengthy, requiring several hours to multiple days to finish. European versions are structured so that each player has a limited "secret mission" objective that shortens the game.

Risk was invented in 1957 by Albert Lamorisse; it became one of the most popular board games in history and inspired other popular games such as Axis & Allies and Settlers of Catan. It is still in production by Hasbro with numerous editions and variants with popular media themes and different rules, including PC software versions, video games, and mobile apps.

== History ==
Risk was invented by French film director Albert Lamorisse and originally released in 1957 as La Conquête du Monde (The Conquest of the World) in France. It was bought by Parker Brothers and released in 1959 with some modifications to the rules as Risk: The Continental Game. In 1975, Parker Brothers retitled the game as Risk: The Game of Global Domination. Some time between Hasbro's acquisition of the Parker Brothers brand in 1991 and 2026, Risk was rebranded under "Hasbro Gaming".

The first new version of Risk was released in 1986. Called Castle Risk, it featured a map depicting 18th-century European castles instead of a map of the world, and it was a financial disappointment. In 1993, the rules for Secret Mission Risk, which had been the standard in Europe, were added to the United States edition. After a limited special-edition release in 1999, in France, called Risk: Édition Napoléon in commemoration of 200th anniversary of the Napoleonic era (1799–1815), a new edition called Risk: 2210 A.D. was published in 2001 by Hasbro's Avalon Hill division. The game was futuristic-themed, featuring moon territories, ocean territories and commander units and offered a number of expansions. Starting in 2002, Risk versions themed around media franchises such as The Lord of the Rings, Star Wars, and Transformers were released, sometimes with as many as six editions per year. A collector's edition of classic Risk in a bookshelf-format wooden box was issued in 2005 as part of the Parker Brothers Vintage Game series, distributed through Target Stores. In 2008, Winning Moves, a Hasbro licensee, introduced 1959 Risk, a reproduction of the original Parker Brothers version with original artwork, wooden playing pieces and rules. Many themed versions are currently being published, and new themes continue to be introduced.

In the first editions, the playing pieces were wooden cubes (one set each of black, blue, green, pink, red and yellow) representing one troop each and a few rounded triangular prisms representing ten troops each, but in later versions of the game these pieces were molded of plastic to reduce costs. In the 1980s, these were changed to pieces shaped into the Roman numerals I, III, V, and X. The 1993 edition introduced plastic infantry tokens (representing a single unit), cavalry (representing five units), and artillery (representing ten units). The 40th Anniversary Collector's Edition contained the same troop pieces but made of metal rather than plastic. In the 2005 "bookcase" edition, playing pieces are once again wooden cubes.

== Equipment and design ==
Eight 'territory cards' from the 1963 UK set and the same from 1980 UK set. The latter were more accurate maps (northern 'Ukraine' and Greece in 'Southern Europe' are more accurate) and the cards were made of higher quality material.

Equipment includes a large tabletop board depicting a political map of the world, divided into forty-two territories, which are grouped into six continents by color. In addition to shared boundaries between territories which define routes of attack/defense, numerous special trans-oceanic or trans-sea routes are also marked; for example, the route between North Africa and Brazil. In the most recent edition of the game, there are a total of 83 attack routes between territories; this number has changed over time as past editions have added or removed some routes. The oceans and seas are not part of the playing field.

Each Risk game comes with a number of sets (either 5 or 6) of different colored tokens denoting troops. A few different or larger tokens represent multiple (usually 5 or 10) troops. These token types are purely a convention for ease of representing a specific army size. If a player runs out of army pieces during the game, pieces of another color or other symbolic tokens (coins, pieces from other games, etc.) may be substituted to help keep track of armies.

Also included is a deck of Risk cards, comprising forty-two territory cards, two wild cards, and twelve or twenty-eight mission cards. The territory cards correspond to the 42 territories on the playing board. Each of the territory cards also depicts a symbol of an infantry, cavalry, or artillery piece. One of these cards is awarded to a player at the end of each turn if the player has successfully conquered at least one territory during that turn. No more than one card may be awarded per turn. If a player collects either three cards with the same symbol, or one of each, or any two plus a wild card, they may be traded in for reinforcements at the beginning of a player's turn. These cards can also be used for game set-up. The two wild cards depict infantry, cavalry and artillery pieces. Because these cards have all three symbols, they can match with any two other cards to form a set. The mission cards each specifying some secret mission (something less than 'conquer the world') are used in the Secret Mission Risk rule variant.

Standard equipment also includes five or six dice in two colors: three red dice for the attacker, and two or three white or blue dice for the defender. There is also a Golden Cavalry piece used to mark the progressive turn-in value of matched sets of territory cards.

In 2022, the iconic Risk logo undertook a rebranding conducted by Toronto-based creative and design agency Quake.

=== Territories ===
The following is a typical layout of the Risk game board, with a table of the corresponding continent and territory names. Each territory on the typical Risk game board represents a real-life geographical or political region. As such, the territory borders are drawn to resemble the geography of those regions. This provides an interior space on which to place the army units, adds an element of realism to the game, and also adds complexity. Most of the territories represent a combination of countries or states; some that have names of single countries or states, such as Argentina, do not represent the boundaries of the real-life entity. Antarctica, the Caribbean, New Zealand, and the Philippines are not represented.

A representation of the Risk game board, showing the different territories, an approximation of their borders, and an approximation of their usual coloring, the asterisk denoting the missing link in the 40th Anniversary Collector's Edition.

The numbers in parentheses represent the number of additional armies granted during the reinforcement stage of a player's turn who controls all of the territories in that continent. Some versions of the board use alternative names for some territories. These names are in parentheses. Not all variations occur concurrently.

North America (5)

1. Alaska
2. Alberta (Western Canada)
3. Central America
4. Eastern United States
5. Greenland
6. Northwest Territory
7. Ontario (Central Canada)
8. Quebec (Eastern Canada)
9. Western United States

South America (2)

1. Argentina
2. Brazil
3. Peru
4. Venezuela

Europe (5)

1. Great Britain (Great Britain & Ireland)
2. Iceland
3. Northern Europe
4. Scandinavia
5. Southern Europe
6. Ukraine (Eastern Europe, Russia)
7. Western Europe

Africa (3)

1. Congo (Central Africa)
2. East Africa (Note: In the 40th Anniversary Collector's Edition, the movement route between the territories of East Africa and Middle East was removed; this was later confirmed to be a manufacturing error, an error repeated in Risk II. Subsequent editions restored the missing route.)
3. Egypt
4. Madagascar
5. North Africa
6. South Africa

Asia (7)

1. Afghanistan (Note: The territory of Afghanistan does not include the present-day country of Afghanistan.)
2. China
3. India (Hindustan)
4. Irkutsk
5. Japan
6. Kamchatka
7. Middle East
8. Mongolia
9. Siam (Southeast Asia)
10. Siberia
11. Ural
12. Yakutsk

Australia (2)

1. Eastern Australia
2. Indonesia
3. New Guinea
4. Western Australia

== Gameplay ==
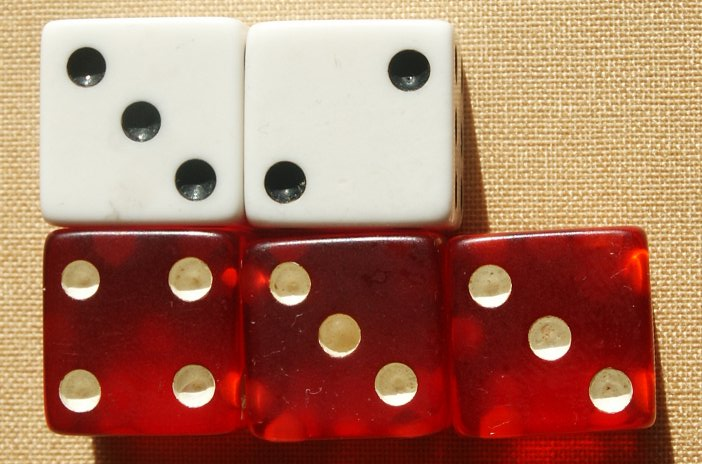
Example of matching up attacking (red) and defending (white) dice; in this dice roll, the defender loses two armies.

Setup consists of determining order of play, issuing armies to players, and allocating the territories on the board among players, who place one or more armies on each one they own. At the beginning of a player's turn, they receive reinforcement armies proportional to the number of territories held, bonus armies for holding whole continents, and additional armies for turning in matched sets of territory cards obtained by conquering new territories. The player may then attack, move their armies, or pass.

On a player's turn, after they have placed their reinforcements, they may choose to attack territories adjacent to theirs which are occupied by enemy armies. A territory is adjacent if it is connected visibly by land, or by a "sea-lane". Attacks are decided by dice rolls, with the attacker or defender losing a specified number of armies per roll. When attacking, a battle may continue until the attacker decides to stop attacking, the attacker has no more armies with which to attack, or the defender has lost their last army at the defending territory, at which point the attacker takes over the territory by moving armies onto it and draws a territory card for that turn.

At the end of a player's turn, they may move armies from one of their territories to another "connected" territory. A player is eliminated from the game when they have lost their last territory. The player that defeated them receives the defeated player's territory cards, if any. The victor is the last player remaining when all other players have been eliminated. There are special rules for two-player games: the territories are divided between the two players and a neutral army during setup. In play, the neutral army only plays defense when attacked, never attacks or moves armies, and does not have a turn like an active player. If the neutral army is eliminated, the game continues under normal rules.

Some editions have rules variants regarding how armies or territories are allocated during setup or how armies may be moved at the end of a turn. There are also variations in the tokens representing armies that do not affect play. European editions assign each player a secret mission, and the game goes until one player completes their mission rather than conquers the world. Different editions have differing numbers of such missions. The Italian edition uses a different number of dice in battle. Themed variants have different map configurations and substantially different rules.

The rules of some editions describe a variant called Capital Risk, where each player has a capital in one of the initially occupied territories. The player to capture all capitals wins. Any armies and territories that belong to the losing nation are turned over to the victor. Capital Risk often leads to much shorter games. Other rules variants for "Risk experts" are also listed. Gaming clubs may also have "house rules" or competition-adjusted rules.

== Strategy ==
The Risk game board as a graph with intercontinental routes in grey and the asterisk denoting the route missing in the 40th Anniversary Collector's Edition

=== Basic strategy ===
The official rulebook recommends three basic strategy points for play under the standard rules:

1. Players should control entire continents to get the bonus reinforcement armies.
2. Players should watch their borders for buildups of armies that could imply an upcoming attack.
3. Players should build up armies on their own borders for better defense.

Holding continents is the most common way to increase reinforcements. Players often attempt to gain control of Australia early in the game, since Australia is the only continent that can be successfully defended by heavily fortifying one country (either Siam or Indonesia). Generally, continents with fewer access routes are easier to defend as they possess fewer territories that can be attacked by other players. South America has 2 access points, North America and Africa each have 3, Europe has 4, and Asia has 5.

Generally, it is thought advisable to hold Risk cards until they can be turned in for maximum reinforcements. This is especially true earlier on in gameplay, because extra armies make a greater difference in the beginning of the game. Eliminating a weak player who holds a large number of Risk cards is also a good strategy, since players who eliminate their opponents get possession of their opponents' Risk cards. In this case, trading in Risk cards earlier may help acquire the necessary troops. If the conquering player has six or more Risk cards after taking the cards of another player, the cards must be immediately turned in for reinforcements until the player has fewer than five cards and then may continue attacking.

"Turtling" is a defensive strategy where a player who feels vulnerable tries to become too expensive to be removed while remaining a threat to harass other players. The objective of this strategy is to avoid early defeat. A player using this strategy might remain in the game all the way to later stages and then mount an attack on the weakest player and start a chain elimination to remove one player after another to win the game. The player who uses this strategy is called a "turtle". The term was popularised in real-time strategy games where a player creates a defensive perimeter or a turtle shell around the base of operations. Solutions to counteract this strategy using cooperation have been proposed.

=== Alliances ===
The rules of Risk neither endorse nor prohibit alliances or truces. Thus players often form unofficial treaties for various reasons, such as safeguarding themselves from attacks on one border while they concentrate their forces elsewhere, or eliminating a player who has grown too strong. Because these agreements are not enforceable by the rules, they are often broken. Alliance making/breaking can be one of the most important elements of the game, and it adds human interaction to a decidedly probabilistic game. Some players allow trading of Risk cards, but only during their turn. This optional rule can make alliances more powerful.

=== Attack and defense ===
Capturing a territory depends on the number of attacking and defending armies and the associated probabilities. In a battle to completion, a player who has more armies (even just one more) has a significant advantage, whether on attack or defense (the number of attacking armies does not include the minimum one army that must be left behind in the territory).

Defenders always win ties when dice are rolled. This gives the defending player the advantage in "one-on-one" fights, but the attacker's ability to use more dice offsets this advantage. It is always advantageous to roll the maximum number of dice, unless an attacker wishes to avoid moving men into a 'dead-end' territory, in which case they may choose to roll fewer than three. Thus when rolling three dice against two, three against one, or two against one, the attacker has a slight advantage, otherwise the defender has an advantage.

There are online tools available to compute the outcome of whole campaigns (i.e. the attacking of several territories in a row).

RisiKo! is a variant of the game released in Italy, in which the defender is allowed to roll up to three dice to defend. This variation dramatically shifts the balance of power towards defense.

== Awards and commendations ==
- Risk was inducted into Games magazine's Hall of Fame in 1984.
- Risk was inducted into Academy of Adventure Gaming Arts and Design Hall of Fame in 1995.
- Risk was inducted into the National Toy Hall of Fame in 2021.

== Official licensed Risk games ==
In addition to the original version of 1959, and a 40th Anniversary Edition with metal pieces, a number of official variants of Risk have been released over the years. In recent years, Hasbro has predominantly based its Risk variants on popular films. In chronological order, the variations of Risk that have been released are:

- Castle Risk (1986) – A version focusing only on Europe in which each player has a castle, and the player's goal is to protect the castle from attack. Castle Risk was the first version of Risk released after 27 years of production to depart from standard play. Although it was unsuccessful, it introduced many concepts integrated into later versions of Risk.
- Risk: 40th Anniversary Collector's Edition (1999)
- Risk: Édition Napoléon (1999) – Adds generals, fortresses, and naval units.
  - Risk: Édition Napoléon: Extension Empire Ottoman (2000) – Adds a sixth player to Risk: Édition Napoléon.
- Risk: 2210 A.D. (2001) – An award-winning futuristic version, produced by Avalon Hill, another division of Hasbro. The game features moon territories, ocean territories and commander units and offers a number of official and unofficial expansions.
- Risk: The Lord of the Rings (2002) – 2–4 player version based on northern Middle-earth.
  - Risk: The Lord of the Rings: Gondor & Mordor Expansion Set (2003) – Extension to Risk: The Lord of the Rings, also includes a 2-player Siege of Minas Tirith mini-game.
- Risk: The Lord of the Rings: Trilogy Edition (2003) – Combines the first two The Lord of the Rings versions, but does not include the Siege of Minas Tirith mini-game.
- Risk Godstorm (2004) – A version based on the mythological pantheons of various ancient civilizations; produced by Avalon Hill.
- Risk: Star Wars: Clone Wars Edition (2005) – Set in the Star Wars universe during the Clone Wars. The player can fight on the side of the Separatists or the Republic, using either the classic Risk rules or the Clone Wars variations where altruism pays off.
- Risk Express (2006) – Designed by Reiner Knizia as part of Hasbro's Express line of games (although not as part of the US-released series). Roll different combinations of infantry, cavalry, artillery & generals to capture the territory cards.
- Risk: Star Wars Original Trilogy Edition (2006) – Set during the Galactic Civil War, players play as the Galactic Empire, the Rebel Alliance, or the Hutts. This version is unique in that each of the factions has a different set of goals and victory conditions.
- Risk Junior: Narnia (2006) – Based on The Lion, the Witch and the Wardrobe, players can play as either the forces of Aslan or as the forces of the White Witch.
- Risk: The Transformers Edition (2007) – Based on the Transformers film, players can either play on the side of the Autobots or the Decepticons on a Cybertron stylised map.
- Risk: Black OPS (2008) – Limited edition released in early 2008. Print run was limited to a 1000 copies. Most of the copies were given to people in the board game industry to test out new rules for up coming editions.
- Risk: Balance of Power (2008) – Based on a European map.
- Risk 1959 (2008) – Winning Moves Games USA released a reproduction of the original game of Risk from 1959. It includes all the original graphics, wood pieces, and individual plastic storage boxes.
- Risk: Reinvention (2009) – Also called Risk Factor or Risk Revised Edition. This is the commercial released version of Black Ops. It features capitals, cities, missions, and very thin pieces shaped like arrows. It is also available with different components (wooden map, wooden cube pieces, etc.) as Risk Onyx Edition.
- Risk: Halo Wars Collector's Edition (2009) – Includes UNSC, Covenant, and The Flood. It has 42 territories and 6 sectors.
- Risk: Factions (2010) – A licensed video game version of the game published by Electronic Arts, and distributed on Xbox Live Arcade and PlayStation Network. Includes a "classic" mode which allows games played using standard original rules, and a "Factions" mode with unique rule variations.
- Risk: Metal Gear Solid (2011)
- Risk: Legacy (2011/12) – The game that introduced the legacy game mechanic, in which permanent changes to the game board and cards occur with each finished game.
- Risk: Halo Legendary (2012)
- Risk: Starcraft (2012) – Four play modes with three different races. Each race has two unique hero units.
- Risk: Star Wars Saga Edition (2013) - UK exclusive
- Risk: Mass Effect Galaxy at War Edition (2013)
- Risk: The Walking Dead Survival Edition (2013)
- Risk: Battlefield Rogue (2013)
- Risk: Plants Vs Zombies (2013)
- Risk: Doctor Who (2013)
- Risk: Game of Thrones (2015)
- Risk: Star Wars Edition Game Standard (2015) – Recreates the Battle of Endor from Star Wars Episode VI: Return of the Jedi. Battles take place across three environments: inside the Emperor's Throne Room; the space outside the Death Star; and the forest moon of Endor.
- Risk: Star Wars Edition Game Black Series (2015) – Same as Risk: Star Wars Edition Game Standard but includes different packaging, embossed playing cards, translucent dice, and miniatures for the Death Star, Super Star Destroyer, Millennium Falcon, and Imperial stormtroopers.
- Risk: Marvel Cinematic Universe (2015)
- Risk: Transformers Decepticon Invasion of Earth (2015) - UK exclusive
- Risk: Captain America Civil War (2016)
- Risk: Star Trek 50th Anniversary Edition (2016)
- Risk (2016)
- Risk: Rustic Edition (2016)
- Risk: Europe (2016)
- Risk: Rick and Morty (2018)
- Risk: Vikings Edition (2018)
- Risk: Call Of Duty: Black Ops Zombies Edition (2019) - GameStop exclusive
- Risk: Assassin's Creed (2019)
- Risk: The Elder Scrolls (2019)
- Risk: Office Politics (2019)
- Risk: Junior (2019) - A pirate-themed variation made for children, with the objective being to have the most points by controlling islands and collecting treasures.
- Risk: The Battle for Medieval England (2019)
- Risk: Warhammer 40,000 (2020)
- Risk: Risk Game with Dragon (2020) - Amazon exclusive; optimized for play with Amazon Alexa and includes a special dragon token for a new game variation.
- Risk: Asterix – Collector's Edition (2020)
- Risk: Shadow Forces (2022) - Sequel to Risk Legacy.
- Risk Strike (2023) - Card-and-dice game.
- Risk Strike: Game of Thrones (2025)

== Variant forms of the games ==
Many of the official versions of Risk listed above have their own rules which may differ slightly or even significantly from the original game of Risk.

=== Variants set on world maps ===
- Risk Legacy. There are five factions, each with different pieces and rules. This game is the originator of the legacy game, a genre of board game where changes to rules or mechanics introduced by previous game sessions permanently affect all future sessions.

=== Variants on regional or country maps ===
- Risk Europe differs markedly from the original game, in that each territory generates a specific income for the player, and the player can purchase new units based on the amount of revenue received. Also, each unit succeeds in its attack if the player hits a specific number or lower during the attack. Also, a new type of unit known as siege weapons is provided to players. Also, players have different types of units, each with their own types of tactics and attacks. All of these game mechanics are notably similar to the basic game-play format of Axis and Allies.
- Risk: The Battle for Medieval England is published in conjunction with English Heritage. It includes cards for special powers and special missions. The game board is a map of England. The object is to become the King of England. If no player wins by a certain point in the game, then all players must retreat.

=== Variants from existing works of science fiction or fantasy ===
- Risk: Star Wars Original Trilogy Edition.When playing by the Star Wars Original Trilogy Edition rules, each of the three factions has its own victory condition. The Empire must eliminate all Rebel forces. The Rebel Alliance must find and destroy the Emperor, who will be hidden under one of the Imperial Bases. The Hutts must take control of 10 out of the 13 designated resource planets on the board. The moment one of these victory conditions has been met by the respective faction, the game is over and that faction has won.
- Risk: Star Trek 50th Anniversary. has a number of rules, cards and units that differ from the original game. the game has "Q cards" in which Q may assign missions to the player. Also, there are location cards providing a specific value for each location. Also, there are cards representing specific crew members, which each have a specific command value.

=== Variants based on concepts from science fiction or fantasy ===
- Risk 2210 A.D. has numerous rules which differ from the original game. The board includes water and moon territories. Game units include commanders (land, naval, space, nuclear, diplomat). Players earn and spend "energy" to obtain commanders, cards, and space stations and to activate some command cards. Players can roll an 8-sided die in some instances. Armies are not acquired through card trading. The game is only 5 years (turns) long; the winner is the player with highest score at the end of the last year. Players bid energy to determine turn order rather than following the same order determined by a dice from the beginning of the game.

== Risk clones by other companies and developers ==
Many variants have been published by other groups or companies, that are based on the original concept of the game of Risk and that contain much of the functionality of the original, but are not licensed by Hasbro, such as the video games Global Domination and Lux. Known as Risk clones, such variants have names not containing the term "Risk" to avoid legal issues. Some of these clones are available commercially, of which many have been released through the iTunes App Store, especially for the iPad. Several other Risk clones are distributed freely over the Internet, such as Dice Wars. Games such as Nintendo Wars can be seen as a complex evolution which still holds some elements from Risk. NarcoGuerra is a newsgame based on the basic Risk rules, played out over a map of Mexico with the intent of educating people on the Mexican drug war. An example of a board game inspired by Risk is the Argentine TEG.

In addition to Risk clones, third-party products have been created which slightly modify traditional gameplay. Among the most popular third-party editions are virtual dice-rolling simulators. These can act as virtual replacements to traditional dice or be used to automatically simulate the results of large battles between territories—significantly speeding up gameplay.

== Video games ==
Several video game versions of Risk have been released as Risk, starting with the Commodore 64 edition in 1988 and the Macintosh edition in 1989. Various other editions have been released for PC, Amiga, Sega Genesis, PlayStation, PlayStation 2, Game Boy Advance, and Nintendo Switch. In 1996 Hasbro Interactive released a PC version of Risk that included a new variation on the game called Ultimate Risk, which did not use dice but rather implemented the use of forts, generals, and complex battle strategies. Risk II for PC and Mac was released as a 2000 video game which includes classic Risk as well as board and gameplay variations. In 2010, Pogo.com added a licensed version of Risk to its library of online games. An Xbox Live Arcade version of Risk called Risk: Factions was released on June 23, 2010. It includes classic Risk as well as a factions mode where players can play as Zombies, Robots, Cats, Soldiers, or Yetis.

As of August 6, 2014, Hasbro and Ubisoft produced a new game for Risk on PS4 and Xbox One, as well as Xbox 360 and PlayStation 3. The game, developed by Zoë Mode and published by Ubisoft, was released in February 2015. A standalone game, Risk: Urban Assault, was released in August 2016.

A licensed iOS app, Risk: The Official Game, developed for the iPhone, iPod Touch, and iPad by Electronic Arts, was released on July 16, 2010. Although the iPad version (Risk HD) has to be bought separately from the iPhone version (Risk), local link up allows games to take place across versions. A maximum of six players can participate. If only one iOS device is available, the "pass and play" mode allows several players to take part in a multi-player game.

Another licensed video game version, RISK: Global Domination, was released in 2015 for iOS, Android and Windows. Developed by SMG Studio, this version includes device sharing, cross-platform online multiplayer, and single player versus computer modes. It was subsequently ported to the Nintendo Switch, releasing on October 30, 2018.

== Television series adaptation ==
On January 11, 2021, it was reported that a television series adaptation of the game is in development from House of Cards creator, Beau Willimon.

== Reception ==
Games magazine included Risk in their "Top 100 Games" series three years in a row:

- "Top 100 Games of 1980", praising it as "a classic" as established by its "attractive playing equipment, seesawing battles, and limitless opportunities for changing rules and making up new variations of the game".
- "Top 100 Games of 1981", noting that an advantage of the game is that "it's easy to make up new variations, tailored to your tastes".
- "Top 100 Games of 1982", noting that "Even the most peace-loving tend to grow aggressive in this game of global conquest".

== Reviews ==
- Family Games: The 100 Best

== See also ==
- Diplomacy, a similarly themed board game
- Global War, 1979 Apple II clone game
- List of board wargames
- Realpolitik, a play-by-mail game compared by two 1990s reviewers to Risk
