= Z2 =

Z2 may refer to:

- Z2 (computer), a computer created by Konrad Zuse
- Z2 (company), video game developer
- Z2 Comics, a publisher of graphic novels
- $\mathbb{Z}_2$, the quotient ring of the ring of integers modulo the ideal of even numbers, alternatively denoted by $\mathbb{Z}/2\mathbb{Z}$
- Z_{2}, the cyclic group of order 2
- GF(2), the Galois field of 2 elements, alternatively written as Z_{2}
- Z_{2}, the standard axiomatization of second-order arithmetic
- Z² (album), an album by Devin Townsend
- German destroyer Z2 Georg Thiele, a Type 1934 destroyer in the German Kriegsmarine
- USS Ringgold (DD-500), a destroyer transferred to the German Navy as Z-2 in 1959
- Westinghouse Airships Z-2 blimp prototype for the U.S. Navy
- Kawasaki Z2, a motorcycle
- RAID-Z2, a way to combine multiple disk drives in a computer
- Zelda II: The Adventure of Link, the second video game in the Legend of Zelda series
- Zork II, a computer game
- A wireless speaker system from Bowers & Wilkins
- Philippines AirAsia, an airline based in Pasay, Philippines
- The Sony Xperia Z2, an Android smartphone
- Zebraman 2: Attack on Zebra City, a 2010 film
- Zoolander 2, a 2016 film
- Zootopia 2, a 2025 animated film

== See also ==
- 2Z (disambiguation)
