= The Legend of Zelda: Echoes of Wisdom =

2024 video game

- Icon artwork, featuring Zelda, the Tri Rod, and the fairy Tri, with Link and the echo of Ganon in the background
- Developers: Nintendo EPD; Grezzo
- Publisher: Nintendo
- Directors: Satoshi Terada; Tomomi Sano
- Producer: Eiji Aonuma
- Designers: Hidetomo Saito; Hiroyuki Kuwata; Rio Oguma
- Programmers: Shingo Watanabe; Michihiro Sakaida; Ikumi Kondo; Kazumi Kobayashi
- Artists: Masaki Yasuda; Yumi Kikuoka; Yuta Okada; Yoshimistu Sato; Kazuhiko Takahashi
- Writer: Taro Hamamoto
- Composers: Masato Ohashi; Manaka Kataoka; Chisaki Hosaka; Reika Nakai; Yuri Goto; Ryotaro Yagi; Azusa Kato
- Series: The Legend of Zelda
- Platform: Nintendo Switch
- Release: September 26, 2024
- Genre: Action-adventure
- Mode: Single-player

The Legend of Zelda: Echoes of Wisdom (Note: Japanese: ゼルダの伝説 知恵のかりもの, Hepburn: Zeruda no Densetsu: Chie no Karimono; lit. 'The Legend of Zelda: Inherited Wisdom') is a 2024 action-adventure game developed by Nintendo and Grezzo and published by Nintendo for the Nintendo Switch. It is the first mainline The Legend of Zelda game with Princess Zelda as the main playable character.

Players control Zelda on a quest to save Link and the kingdom of Hyrule using the Tri Rod, a magical artifact provided by the fairy Tri, who assists her. The visual style is similar to that of the 2019 remake of The Legend of Zelda: Link's Awakening, which Grezzo also developed. Echoes of Wisdom was released to generally favorable reviews.

== Gameplay ==
The player controls Princess Zelda, who can use the power of the magical Tri Rod to create "echoes", which are imitations of objects and monsters that can be used freely. However, there is a limit on how many can be summoned and each echo has a different cost; how many echoes can be created is indicated by the number of triangles visible behind Tri. She can also "bind" objects with Bind, allowing an object to move with her, or move with an object using Reverse Bind. In addition to having echoes fight enemies, Zelda can fight enemies directly by wielding a sword that transforms her into the Swordfighter form, which resembles Link. This form can only be used for a limited time before its energy must be replenished by collecting orbs of energy found in the Still World.

Zelda can travel through various methods, including riding echoes, fast travel sites called Waypoints, on foot, or on horseback. She can also change outfits or equipment and combine ingredients to concoct smoothies which she can then purchase.

== Synopsis ==
=== Setting and characters ===
The Legend of Zelda: Echoes of Wisdom takes place in a fictional fantasy setting. Within the series's chronology, Echoes of Wisdom falls in the "Defeated Hero" timeline, taking place some time after the events of The Legend of Zelda: Tri Force Heroes and before the events of The Legend of Zelda. In addition to Hyrule, the game features the Still World, which is connected to Hyrule through rifts that each lead to a different section of it, where people, objects, and terrain transported there are frozen in time. There are also dungeons that Zelda explores, each with a boss that must be defeated in order to progress.

Many of the people of Hyrule appear throughout the game, including the Gerudo, river and ocean Zoras, Gorons, Deku Scrubs, and Yetis. Dampé creates automata that function similarly to echoes.

=== Plot ===
While rescuing Princess Zelda from Ganon, Link disappears into the Still World after falling into a mysterious rift; similar rifts appear throughout Hyrule, causing others to disappear into the Still World, including its king and his advisors, General Wright and Minister Lefte. Upon Zelda's return to Hyrule Castle, imposters of the king and his advisors frame her for causing the rifts and imprison her in the castle's dungeons to be executed. Zelda escapes with help from the fairy Tri, who gives her the Tri Rod and accompanies her on her journey throughout Hyrule to repair the rifts and rescue those trapped in the Still World.

During her adventure, she confronts an imposter of Link and rescues the real Link from Ganon after confronting and defeating him in Hyrule Castle, but Ganon is revealed to be an imposter created by the primordial evil Null, who also possesses the ability to create echoes and captures Link. After Zelda repairs the rifts affecting the shrines of the Golden Goddesses, Din, Nayru, and Farore, they explain to her that Null resided in the void that existed before reality, consuming life when it developed in order to remain the only being in existence. The Goddesses created the universe over the void to seal away Null, causing it to resent them. After Hyrule was founded, Null attempted to break its seal by creating rifts in order to destroy it and return existence to the void. To counteract the rifts, the Goddesses sent the Tris to repair the rifts and return to them once their purpose was fulfilled.

Null attempts to take the Prime Energy for itself by creating an echo of Zelda, whom the Goddesses deemed worthy of possessing part of its power along with Link. However, as Null has an unbalanced heart, it only obtained the Triforce of Power, with Wisdom going to Zelda, and Courage creating a rift leading to Link. Zelda's echo enters, to obtain Link's piece, with Zelda in pursuit. Zelda defeats the echo of herself, but Null obtains the Triforce piece regardless and creates massive rifts spanning nearly all of Hyrule. Zelda frees Link, and they ultimately confront and destroy Null. The Tris, powered by a wish from the complete Triforce, repair the rifts and return to the Goddesses while Zelda reunites with the king.

== Development ==
Development of Echoes of Wisdom began after the completion of development on the Link's Awakening remake as a new 2D top-down Zelda game for the Switch, originally as an expansion of the dungeon editor system in Link's Awakening before becoming an original game. Grezzo director Satoshi Terada and Nintendo director Tomomi Sano worked on the game with series producer Eiji Aonuma, contributing new ideas such as the echoes system and having Zelda as the protagonist rather than Link. Terada struggled to come up with ideas for echoes because the development team was worried about the problems it could cause, such as being too weak or too strong and having to function in both top-down and side-on views. Aonuma wanted to bring a new creativity and innovation to the series, feeling that Link's Awakening offered a new approach to combining gameplay from these perspectives. He asked Grezzo to work with Nintendo EPD Group No. 3 on the game, as it was the first time they had worked on an original Zelda game rather than a remake. The game features a similar art style to the 2019 remake of Link's Awakening.

Echoes of Wisdom is the first main Zelda game with Princess Zelda as the primary playable character. She was previously playable in games developed by third-party companies, including Zelda: The Wand of Gamelon (1993) and Zelda's Adventure (1996) for the Philips CD-i, and spin-off games such as Hyrule Warriors (2014) and Cadence of Hyrule (2019). According to Aonuma, Link was originally going to be the protagonist, but he was concerned that players would neglect the echoes system in favor of using weapons. Making Zelda the protagonist provided a justification for the echoes mechanic while satisfying fans' requests for her to be playable.

Echoes of Wisdom was announced during a June 2024 Nintendo Direct; it was released on September 26, 2024.

== Reception ==
Reception

Aggregate scores
Aggregator	Score
Metacritic	85/100
OpenCritic	93% recommend

Review scores
Publication	Score
Digital Trends	3.5/5
Eurogamer	4/5
Famitsu	10/10, 9/10, 9/10, 8/10
Game Informer	8/10
GameSpot	9/10
GamesRadar+	4/5
IGN	9/10
Nintendo Life	9/10
PCMag	4.5/5
Shacknews	10/10
TechRadar	4/5
The Guardian	3/5
Video Games Chronicle	3/5
VG247	4/5

The Legend of Zelda: Echoes of Wisdom received "generally favorable" reviews from critics, according to review aggregator Metacritic, and 92% of critics recommended the game, according to OpenCritic. In Japan, four critics from Famitsu gave the game a total score of 36 out of 40. Most critics praised the game for the sense of freedom it gave players. The main criticisms focused on the game's performance, as the frame rate on the Switch is variable, and on the menu system used to select echoes during gameplay. There are 127 echoes in total, and the method of selecting them involves scrolling sideways through a long row of icons; addressing this point, director Satoshi Terada stated that it was a way to encourage players to experiment, making them "fall upon and see the echoes that they may not have noticed".

=== Sales ===
In Japan, Echoes of Wisdom sold 200,121 physical copies throughout its first week of release, making it the bestselling retail game of the week in the country. By March 2025, the game had sold 4.09 million copies worldwide.

=== Accolades ===
Year	Ceremony	Category	Result	Ref.
2024	Golden Joystick Awards	Console Game of the Year	Nominated	
2024	The Game Awards 2024	Best Action / Adventure Game	Nominated	
2024	The Game Awards 2024	Best Family Game	Nominated	
2025	28th Annual D.I.C.E. Awards	Adventure Game of the Year	Nominated	
2025	NAVGTR Awards 2024	Control Design, 2D or Limited 3D/VR	Won	
2025	NAVGTR Awards 2024	Control Precision	Nominated	
2025	NAVGTR Awards 2024	Gameplay Design, Franchise	Nominated	
2025	NAVGTR Awards 2024	Game of the Year	Nominated	
2025	NAVGTR Awards 2024	Game, Franchise Family	Nominated	
2025	21st British Academy Games Awards	Best Game	Nominated	
2025	21st British Academy Games Awards	Family	Longlisted	
2025	21st British Academy Games Awards	Game Design	Nominated	
