= Arzette: The Jewel of Faramore =

2024 video game

- Developer: Seedy Eye Software
- Publisher: Limited Run Games
- Director: Seth Fulkerson
- Producer: Audi Sorlie
- Designer: Seth Fulkerson
- Writers: Seth Fulkerson; Audi Sorlie
- Composer: Jake Silverman
- Engine: GameMaker
- Platforms: Nintendo Switch; PlayStation 4 PlayStation 5 Windows; Xbox Series X/S
- Release: February 14, 2024
- Genres: Action, platform
- Mode: Single-player

Arzette: The Jewel of Faramore is a platform game developed by Seedy Eye Software and published by Limited Run Games. It was released on February 14, 2024, for Nintendo Switch, PlayStation 4, PlayStation 5, Xbox Series X/S, and Windows. Arzette is a spiritual successor to the CD-i games Link: The Faces of Evil and Zelda: The Wand of Gamelon.

== Gameplay ==
Arzette: The Jewel of Faramore is an action-platformer. The player controls the titular protagonist, Arzette, who explores the land of Faramore on a quest to defeat the evil Daimur. The gameplay is that of a 2D action platformer, with animated cutscenes in an art style similar to that in the CD-i games. The game has been described as an "interactive animated adventure". Level designer John Linneman described the game as having strong similarities to Monster World.

== Plot ==
In the past, the kingdom of Faramore fell under attack by the demon lord Daimur and his army of evil monsters, aided by the traitorous Duke Nodelki of Amelog. In response, King Rahklin, along with his daughter Princess Arzette, his advisor Wogram and an unlikely hero, Dail, led an assault on Daimur's lair in the country of Oakurin. Using the magical Jewel of Faramore, Daimur was sealed in the Book of Oakurin, and peace returned. As the Jewel shatters into five shards on each use, Rahklin ordered the shards to be protected separately in order to prevent Daimur's release, while Nodelki was sentenced to a lifetime of hard labor.

Ten years later, Nodelki recovers the Jewel shards and frees Daimur from his imprisonment. The demon lord grants Nodelki magic powers in exchange for his soul and charges him and his top four minions with protecting the shards while he exacts revenge on Faramore. Arzette, who was the only one to continue honing her skills in peacetime, takes it upon herself to relight the Sacred Beacons and recover the Sacred Candles that can dispel Daimur's dark magic enveloping the land.

Arzette ventures across Faramore, defeating Daimur's minions to recover the Jewel's shards while helping its citizens with their various problems in exchange for new powers. During her quest, King Rahklin dies, hardening Arzette's resolve to vanquish Daimur for good. After slaying Nodelki and claiming the last shard, Dail and Wogram encourage her to seal Daimur in the Book of Oakurin again, but Arzette forgoes this plan and instead has her sword infused with the Jewel of Faramore. Upon confronting Daimur in his lair, Arzette defeats him and, ignoring his offer of power, destroys him permanently with her Jewel-infused sword. Arzette is crowned Queen for defeating Daimur, but she insists that the entire Kingdom contributed to his defeat and declares Faramore to become a democracy, holding a feast to celebrate.

In a post-credits scene, an unknown female voice is heard laughing as the Book of Oakurin magically opens itself.

== Development ==
Arzette was developed by Seth "Dopply" Fulkerson under the developer name "Seedy Eye Software", a homophonic pun on "CD-i". In November 2020, Fulkerson released unofficial remakes for Link: The Faces of Evil and Zelda: The Wand of Gamelon on Linux and Windows. To avoid receiving a cease-and-desist notice from Nintendo like many similar unofficial projects, Fulkerson made the remakes unavailable for download two days after their release.

The development for Arzette began in late 2020 through developing his company Seedy Eye Software and Limited Run Games as the publisher. On July 12, 2023, the game was announced by Limited Run Games. Jeffrey Rath and Bonnie Jean Wilbur, voice actors for Link and Zelda in the CD-i games, were also revealed to be voicing the game's tutorial voice and narrator respectively. He also contacted some of the original artists of the CD-i games, including artist Rob Dunlavey. Digital Foundry's John Linneman announced his involvement as level designer after the initial reveal, while fellow Digital Foundry personality Audun Sorlie revealed his involvement as lead producer and writer for the game. In an interview with GamesRadar+, Fulkerson stated that the animators were given free rein, with their only limitations being the color palette, resolution, and frame-rate of the cutscenes of the original CD-i Zelda games.

On October 29, 2023, Limited Run Games announced the game would release on February 14, 2024.

== Reception ==
Reception

Aggregate scores
Aggregator	Score
Metacritic	77/100
OpenCritic	75% recommend

Review scores
Publication	Score
Destructoid	85/100
Nintendo Life	7/10
Nintendo World Report	80/100
Push Square	7/10
Retro Gamer	76%
TouchArcade	3.5/5

Arzette: The Jewel of Faramore received "generally favorable reviews" according to review aggregator website Metacritic. Review aggregator OpenCritic assessed that the game was recommended by 75% of critics.
