= Battle Nations =

2011 video game

- Developers: Madrona Games, Inc., (former) Z2
- Platforms: iOS, OS X, Android, Microsoft Windows
- Release: November 17, 2011
- Genres: Turn-based strategy, simulation
- Modes: Single-player, multiplayer

Battle Nations is a freemium turn-based strategy multiplayer video game originally developed and published by Z2Live, and now currently under development by Madrona Games. The game was officially shut down by Z2Live on September 28, 2016, along with many of their other titles. This event followed the acquisition of Z2Live by King in 2015.

In the years following the closure of Battle Nations, work began on a fan-made remake. A sandbox version of the game with limited scope was then re-released and funded by community creators in 2018. As of September 4, 2023, the community development team (now officially named Madrona Games) successfully reached a licensing agreement with King, ending their legal dispute and allowing development to continue. The game was released as a closed beta in 2024 and relaunched on May 31, 2025.

== Gameplay ==
The game puts players in control of land with limited resources where effective management of resources is vital to expansion and advancement. Building a productive nation allows players to form armies which are the basis for the game's core: PvP combat in turn-based strategy warfare. It is impossible to 'lose' in Battle Nations: even if the player has no buildings to generate gold, the player will always have enough gold to build a supply drop, which generates 100 gold every hour as well as 25 iron, wood, and stone. Most of the technology in game is based on World War II-era military hardware, although there are a few exceptions (e.g. velociraptors, mammoths, lasers, swords, plasma, railguns, etc.).

=== Battling ===
Depending on the type of battle, this could mean a 9-block plot (arranged 3x3) or a 13-block plot (first and second row have 5, third row has 3). One unit fits into each plot, however there is a limit on how many units can be used for each battle. The battle is turn-based where the player selects a unit, an attack from the unit, and the targeted block (or, depending on the type of attack, the enemy unit). After the attack is played out, the enemy responds with an attack. The player may also forfeit their turn by clicking the "Pass" button, or the player can withdraw from the battle by clicking a white flag icon in the top-left corner of the screen.

=== Building ===
The player's base, called their 'Outpost', is their main way of collecting primary resources (by building Iron Mines, Coal Quarries, Oil Pumps, and Wood Loggers) and secondary resources (Steel is made by a Steel Mill with Iron and Coal, Lumber is by a Lumber mill made with Wood). Other important buildings include warehouses (small, medium, large, high-capacity), Barracks (used to train most troops), Hospitals, Vehicle Factories, and Vehicle Repair Bays. All of the previously mentioned buildings have premium versions which can be purchased using nanopods with faster repair times and smaller repair costs.

Initially, only a small portion of the map is unlocked. The player must then buy land expansions to gain access to more land. The land expansions progressively get more expensive as well as take longer to complete.

All construction times for buildings as well as land expansions can be sped up with the use of nanopods.

=== Nanopods ===
Nanopods are a rare resource in Battle Nations and serve as the game's premium currency. They can be used to buy units, buildings, speed up unit training and construction, research new unit attacks, and buy resources the user lacks. They are bought with real money, although the player can also win them by levelling up (10 free nanopods granted to the player each level), watching advertisements or achieving a specific rank in events (Boss Strikes or Arena Challenges). Units and buildings that require nanopods tend to be better than the ones requiring normal resources instead, but not always. Promotional units, which more powerful specialty units that are only available to purchase for a limited amount of time, can only be purchased with nanopods. In the final week before Battle Nations was shut down, 1 million nanopods were added to every Battle Nations account and many previously retired promotional units became available to players for purchase.

== Plot ==
Battle Nations is set on the continent of Ateria, with the Empire embroiled in a decades-long civil war against the Rebellion. Two years after the Empire's best general, General Ashe, defects to the rebels, the Empire is looking for alternative strategies to win the war, and begins searching for uranium to use in a superweapon to defeat the rebels once and for all. The player (referred to as 'Captain') leads the Empire's 95th Rifle Company, which is tasked with establishing and maintaining an outpost on the hostile, apparently uranium-rich Northern Frontier - all while fighting against a wide array of enemies and critters.

The game also has a number of other major storylines, as well as many smaller storylines (most of which were for limited edition events). Some major plot points include defeating Warlord Gantas (the antagonist boss of the Raiders), attacking Rebel Forces (after they successfully take down the Imperial Forces), and confronting the Sovereign Navy (mainly by boats).

The characters that routinely assist in this plot include the alcoholic Lieutenant Morgan, hulking Sergeant Ramsey, Perkins, Dr. Aurora, and many more.

== Development ==
Battle Nations is Z2Live's third game, following Trade Nations and MetalStorm. Z2Live released a video that described the inspiration behind the creation of Battle Nations. The concept for the game was inspired by Trade Nations users who provided feedback requesting additional PvP elements in the game. As the player base grew, Battle Nations was regularly updated to add new units, quests and events.

In August 2013, limited time events called 'Boss Strikes' were added to the game, in which players in guilds fought against waves of AI enemies to get the highest score possible. Rewards for victory and participation included special units (including air units, which were also added in the update) and resource rewards. 'Invasions' also presented opportunities for guild members to work together and compete against other guilds by defeating enemy invasions on their outposts. 'Arena Challenges' allowed players to square up against other players in asynchronous player-versus-player combat.

On September 18, 2014, Battle Nations was released on Steam, and a patch included a range of promotional units and missions based on Team Fortress 2 available for a limited time.

An update on November 12, 2014, added naval units to the game along with a new storyline and two new factions, the Sovereign Navy and the Reef Bandits.

=== Discontinuation ===
In February 2015, it was announced that the Swedish development company King had purchased Z2 Live Inc. for $150 million. Subsequently, Battle Nations was pulled from the Steam platform on April 16, 2015. During this time, the game developers released fewer and fewer updates and events. On July 17, 2015, the game developers released the last update, focused on a new world boss and two eventual boss-strikes, along with some additional units. Shortly after in November 2015, Activision Blizzard announced their plans to purchase King, and the deal was finalized on February 23, 2016.

On June 28, 2016, Z2 announced that it was closing down all its live service games, and that all Z2 games would no longer be available to download. Battle Nations was officially shut down on September 28, 2016.

Z2 was ultimately closed down on February 12, 2019, in the wake of corporate restructuring by King's parent company, Activision Blizzard.

=== Revival ===
In the years following the closure of Battle Nations, fans of the game started work on several "inspired" spin-offs and direct fan re-creations of the game. The development of these fan-made remakes was hindered by legal disputes with King over the use of the Battle Nations intellectual property. However, in October 2023, Madrona Games announced they had reached a license agreement with King to continue work on an official re-release of Battle Nations, which was fully released in 2025.
