= Ganon =

Video game character

Ganon / Ganondorf
- The Legend of Zelda character
- Ganondorf as he first appears in artwork for The Legend of Zelda: Ocarina of Time
- First game: As Ganon: The Legend of Zelda (1986); As Ganondorf: The Legend of Zelda: Ocarina of Time (1998)
- Created by: Shigeru Miyamoto
- Designed by: Shigeru Miyamoto (Ganon); Satoru Takizawa (Ganondorf)
- Portrayed by: Uli Latukefu (2027 film)
- Voiced by: Japanese: Takashi Nagasako (1998-2002, 2018); Hironori Miyata (2006-2014); Taiten Kusunoki (Hyrule Warriors); Kōsuke Takaguchi (2023-present); English: Len Carlson (TV series); Matthew Mercer (2023-present)

In-universe information
- Full name: Ganondorf Dragmire
- Race: Demon; Gerudo (as Ganondorf)
- Origin: Hyrule

Ganon (Note: Japanese: ガノン, Hepburn: Ganon) is a fictional character and the main antagonist of Nintendo's The Legend of Zelda video game series and franchise, as well as the final boss in many Zelda titles. In his humanoid Gerudo form, he is known as Ganondorf. (Note: Japanese: ガノンドロフ, Hepburn: Ganondorofu) A massive and malevolent porcine monster, Ganon first appeared in the original The Legend of Zelda game in 1986, while his alter ego, Ganondorf, was introduced in A Link to the Past and made a physical appearance in Ocarina of Time. He has since appeared in the majority of the games in the series in various forms. He is the archenemy of the main protagonist Link and Princess Zelda of Hyrule and originally the king of the Gerudo, a race of humanoid desert nomads before becoming the ruler of his demon army.

His specific motives vary from game to game, but most often involve capturing Princess Zelda and planning to conquer Hyrule and the world at large. To this end, he seeks the Triforce, an omnipotent artifact that grants any wish its bearer desires, and usually manipulates several other villains to realize his ambitions. In most games, he possesses the Triforce of Power, which gives him godlike strength, boundless mystical power, and invulnerability to all but the most powerful sacred weapons, such as the Master Sword. He appears in various spin-off games, such as Hyrule Warriors and Age of Calamity, and the Super Smash Bros. series.

The character has been well received by critics and is one of the most recognizable villains in gaming. The boss battles against Ganon have been praised as memorable and the character has been named as one of the greatest video game villains of all time. As the main villain of the series, Ganon has also appeared in a variety of media, including an animated television series and manga. Uli Latukefu portrays Ganondorf in the live-action film The Legend of Zelda.

== Concept and creation ==
Ganon was conceived as the antagonist of The Legend of Zelda video game by Shigeru Miyamoto working alongside Takashi Tezuka.

=== Characterisation ===
Ganon, as depicted in promotional artwork for The Legend of Zelda: Oracle of Ages and Oracle of Seasons

Ganon has two basic forms that appear throughout the series: one is a gigantic porcine form and the other is his humanoid Gerudo form. In the original The Legend of Zelda, A Link to the Past, Oracle of Seasons and Oracle of Ages, Four Swords Adventures, A Link Between Worlds, and Echoes of Wisdom he is depicted as a blue, bipedal pig wielding either a large sword or a trident. Ocarina of Time marks the first appearance of his humanoid form named Ganondorf, the physically imposing and armor-clad king of the Gerudo.

For the development of Ocarina of Time, Ganon was designed by character designer Satoru Takizawa. He imagined Ganon as a "crooked and complex thief, who was basically an all-around abominable human being". However, script director Toru Osawa thought that Ganondorf should have "parts where he is rather good", comparing him to the character of Raoh in Fist of the North Star. With this idea in mind, Takizawa created a tentative model of Ganondorf based on actor Christopher Lambert (while the resulting designs were very different). Since Ganon had appeared earlier as a boar-like creature, Takizawa decided that Ganondorf should transform into such at the end of the game and wanted to consult Shigeru Miyamoto on this, but realised that he had no opinion on the matter. He decided on making Ganon a beast "with the feeling of a pig" to reference A Link to the Past.

Following the release of Tears of the Kingdom, the game's director Hidemaro Fujibayashi said that he had approached Ganondorf as a main character due to his long history in the series. He added that he considered Ganondorf to be the perfect opposing character to Princess Zelda due to being a king of the Gerudo with his own motivations. Series producer Eiji Aonuma said that although Ganondorf had been portrayed throughout the series as an evil character, Tears of the Kingdom was the first game to firmly establish him as overwhelmingly evil by including a violent scene where he kills another character.

=== Names ===
Ganon was originally known as "Hakkai" during development of the original The Legend of Zelda, in reference to a humanoid pig character known as Zhu Bajie (Cho Hakkai in Japanese) from the 16th century Chinese novel Journey to the West. The character was given the name "Ganondorf Dragmire" in the English version of the A Link to the Past instruction manual while his monster form's name was "Mandrag Ganon". In 2017, Nintendo reconfirmed that "Dragmire" is the character's surname on its official Zelda website.

Ganon was sometimes spelled inconsistently in earlier games. In the Japanese versions of the first three games, his name is anglicized as "Gannon". This spelling appears in two Western releases: the original The Legend of Zelda, and the non-canonical Zelda's Adventure.

=== Character design ===
Like all Gerudo, Ganondorf possesses olive dark skin, amber eyes, and red hair. Ganondorf is around 230 centimetres (7 ft 7 in) and was first drawn with a "sharp, birdlike nose" that is characteristic of the Gerudo and "strong, supple muscles". Ganondorf's clothing in Ocarina of Time was designed in the style of a 1980s visual kei band, with producer Toru Osawa suggesting that his design incorporate a color scheme of red, black, and gold.

In The Wind Waker, Ganondorf was designed as an older version of his Ocarina of Time incarnation. The artists depicted him as middle-aged and created drawings of him "with an Eastern flavor". His robe was decorated with patterns that were designed to be a twist on the mark of the Gerudo seen previously. Ganondorf's reappearance in Twilight Princess returned him to a similar age to his original appearance in Ocarina of Time. His design was created to look like a warrior, dressed in armour. He also transforms into Dark Beast Ganon and this concept art was created with the caption "Pig Ganon".

Ganon evolved into other monstrous forms for his appearance in Breath of the Wild. He is presented as a primal evil force that is visible as a serpentine cloud circling around Hyrule Castle. His physical form Calamity Ganon is a grotesque monster that resembles a spider equipped with various weapons. His final form is Dark Beast Ganon, a giant boar similar to previous iterations. Artist Yuki Hamada explained that his enormous size was due to the team wanting the game to end in the vast open plain of Hyrule Field. In addition, the Blight Ganons that Link encounters in the Divine Beasts were designed with similar design features, such as his red hair, as the artist Takafumi Kiuchi wanted players to feel Ganon's presence at all times.

For the return of Ganondorf in Tears of the Kingdom the character's design was reassigned to Takizawa. Fujibayashi said that he had given him the task of making him a "very cool, very awesome demon king" due to him being a crucial character within the series. He said that the designer intended to give Ganondorf an evil appearance but also wanted him to appear good so that anyone could fall in love with him. The team spent time designing his facial expressions to give him brutality but also a sense of humanity. Ganondorf's appearance was designed with the flavour of a Japanese warlord. Every aspect of his design was carefully considered to give the impression of strength, elegance and intelligence and to portray a character with fine tastes who takes care of his appearance.

=== Portrayal ===
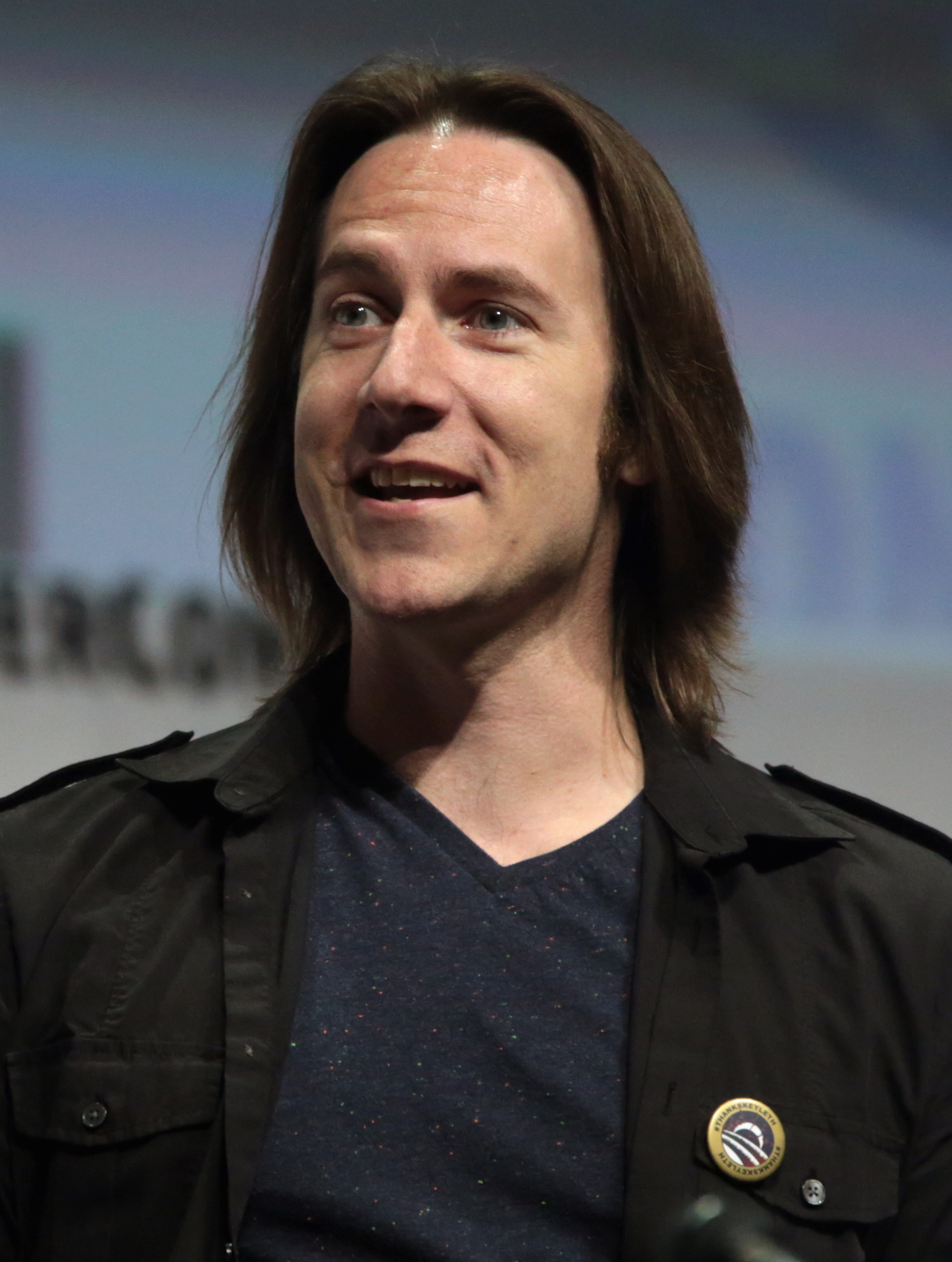
Matthew Mercer provides Ganondorf's English voice in The Legend of Zelda: Tears of the Kingdom and the 2026 remake of Ocarina of Time.

Ganon has been voiced by several voice actors. In the 1989 The Legend of Zelda animated television series and Captain N: The Game Master, he was voiced by Len Carlson. In the Zelda series and other spin-off games, the character has been voiced by several Japanese voice actors, including Takashi Nagasako in Ocarina of Time, The Wind Waker, Super Smash Bros. Melee and Ultimate; Hironori Miyata in Twilight Princess, Super Smash Bros. Brawl and Super Smash Bros. for Nintendo 3DS and Wii U; Taiten Kusunoki in Hyrule Warriors; and Kōsuke Takaguchi in Tears of the Kingdom. In the English dub of Tears of the Kingdom and the 2026 remake of Ocarina of Time, he is voiced by Matthew Mercer, who unofficially portrayed the character in the live action web series There Will Be Brawl. He will be portrayed by Uli Latukefu in the live-action Legend of Zelda movie.

== Characteristics ==
Ganon is the main antagonist in The Legend of Zelda series. He usually appears as the final boss at the end of each game. A recurring storyline in the series centres around the protagonist Link fighting to save Princess Zelda after she is captured by Ganon. Over the course of the series, Ganon has been depicted in various physical forms. His humanoid form known as Ganondorf is the king and only male member of the Gerudo, a race predominantly consisting of female warriors. His monstrous bestial form, Ganon, resembles a giant boar. In some games, either Ganon or Ganondorf appear as the final boss, whereas in others, he transforms between the two.

Throughout the series, Ganon has been characterised as the embodiment of evil and is placed in direct opposition to the main protagonist Link and Princess Zelda across multiple generations in the fictional timeline. In Skyward Sword, he is implied to be the incarnation of the antagonist Demon King Demise's hatred following the character's defeat. The game was presented as the start of The Legend of Zelda fictional timeline and the origin of his endless battle with Link and Zelda. In Breath of the Wild, his Dark Beast Ganon form is described as "Hatred and Malice Incarnate".

The character's motivations typically centre around destroying Hyrule or placing himself in a position of power as ruler. His destructive influence is illustrated in Ocarina of Time, when Link awakens from a seven-year sleep to discover Hyrule transformed from a peaceful kingdom to a place of fear shrouded in darkness following Ganondorf's rise to power. In Breath of the Wild, his destructive power is so great, that he almost wipes out the entire civilisation of Hyrule in a cataclysm known as the Great Calamity.

In the fictional lore of the series, Ganon is the bearer of the Triforce of Power, one of three components that form a core symbol of the series, a divine relic called the Triforce. The three pieces of the Triforce represent the qualities of the three characters, with Ganon being the bearer of the Triforce of Power and Link and Zelda bearing the Triforce of Courage and Wisdom respectively. A recurring plot element in the series is Ganon's desire to obtain the completed Triforce, which offers limitless power to its bearer. This struggle for control of the Triforce has been a central aspect of several games, such as Ocarina of Time, and binds the three main characters in an eternal battle across the fictional Zelda timeline.

=== Powers and abilities ===
Ganon/Ganondorf is presented as a dangerous foe who is difficult to defeat. He is a formidable warrior and sorcerer, capable of dual-wielding large blades, such as great swords. He is typically only defeated by Link with the use of a legendary weapon like the Master Sword or Light Arrows. Due to his near-immortality and indestructible power, he often needs to be sealed away in another realm by magic to prevent him from causing more destruction. Like Link and Zelda, he is repeatedly reincarnated in subsequent games.

In addition to his combat skills, he also demonstrates various magical powers that originate in his use of dark magic. He can use various defensive measures in combat, such as creating magical barriers. In the original The Legend of Zelda game and A Link to the Past he is able to turn himself invisible. Ganondorf also has the ability of teleportation, giving him the advantage of sneaking behind his opponent in combat, a skill that he displays in Twilight Princess. In Ocarina of Time he has the ability to levitate. He has also demonstrated that he can pass between dimensions, such as the Dark World and the Twilight Realm.

In several games, he is able to create a mini boss in his own likeness named Phantom Ganon. In Ocarina of Time, Phantom Ganon is the boss of the Forest Temple and appears as a ghostly rider that can jump in and out of paintings. In The Wind Waker, he creates Puppet Ganon, a marionette that takes three forms, each requiring a different strategy to defeat. In Tears of the Kingdom, Phantom Ganon is a powerful foe that deals additional damage with an expanding pool of gloom. He also has the power to possess and control other characters. In Twilight Princess he possesses Princess Zelda and uses her body like a puppet to fight Link. He can also manipulate other characters for his own benefit, such as Zant in Twilight Princess. In Breath of the Wild, Calamity Ganon is able to corrupt creatures with the spread of a substance called Malice. He reinstates his influence over the land of Hyrule in Breath of the Wild and Tears of the Kingdom by conjuring a Blood Moon, which resurrects fallen monsters.

== Appearances ==
=== The Legend of Zelda series ===
Ganon's first appearance in the original 1986 The Legend of Zelda

Ganon made his first appearance in the original NES video game The Legend of Zelda in 1986 in the form of a blue monstrous pig. The game established the character's desire for power, which was reiterated in subsequent games. The storyline involves Ganon invading Hyrule with his army and stealing the Triforce of Power. To prevent him from obtaining the Triforce of Wisdom, Princess Zelda scatters the eight pieces across the kingdom. Link is then sent on a quest to retrieve the eight fragments and finally defeats Ganon using a silver arrow. The second entry in the Zelda series, which is titled Zelda II: The Adventure of Link, does not feature the physical presence of Ganon, but his image appears in the final game over screen, signifying his return.

He was reintroduced in the Super Nintendo Entertainment System game A Link to the Past. It expands on Ganon's backstory by revealing that he used to be a man named Ganondorf, the leader of a group of thieves, who enters the Sacred Realm and steals the Triforce, which plunges the Sacred Realm into darkness. After he is sealed in the Dark World, Link and Zelda are sent there by the wizard Agahnim, who is an avatar used to contain Ganon's spirit. Once Link defeats Agahnim in the Dark World, Ganon rises from his body and turns into a bat. He is finally defeated by Link at the Pyramid of Power. In Link's Awakening, the fourth Shadow Nightmare that Link faces in the final boss battle is based on Ganon from A Link to the Past.

Ocarina of Time, which was released for the Nintendo 64, introduced the character in his humanoid form as Ganondorf, the king of the Gerudo thieves, expanding upon the backstory in A Link to the Past. Ganondorf schemes to take the Triforce from the Sacred Realm in order to conquer Hyrule and, after a young Link is put in a seven-year sleep, Link wakes as an adult to discover that Ganondorf is now ruling over Hyrule. After stealing the Triforce, Ganondorf's evil heart breaks it into three pieces, with Ganondorf keeping the Triforce of Power. In the final boss fight, Link and Ganondorf battle at Ganon's Castle, but before the fight is over, he transforms into his beast form, Ganon. He is finally defeated by Link and sealed in the Dark Realm.

In 2001, two games titled Oracle of Seasons and Oracle of Ages were released for the Game Boy Color handheld console. They feature their own antagonists, but upon completing either game, the player receives a password that provides access to a linked game in the opposite title. The linked game reveals Ganon as the secret final boss, who was resurrected by two witches named Twinrova.

Ganondorf resumes his plans to obtain the Triforce and conquer Hyrule in The Wind Waker. Although he is not initially presented as the main villain, he is revealed to be the master of the Helmaroc King. He kidnaps multiple young girls with pointed ears in order to find Zelda so he can complete the Triforce and bring Hyrule back to the surface to take over, including Link's younger sister Aryll. In the final boss battle, Link defeats him by thrusting the Master Sword into his forehead, turning him to stone.

In Four Swords Adventures, the antagonists are initially shown to be Shadow Link and Vaati. However, Ganon is revealed to be the true antagonist who stole a powerful magical trident and Dark Mirror to create the evil version of Link. Ganon uses Shadow Link to kidnap the shrine maidens of Hyrule and murders the Knights of Hyrule, trapping them in the World of Darkness. Link and his clones free the shrine maidens and seal Ganon inside the Four Sword to return peace to Hyrule.

In Twilight Princess, Ganondorf manipulates the sorcerer Zant to usurp the throne of the Twilight Realm. In the game's backstory, the Sages banish Ganondorf with the Mirror of Twilight for trying to steal the Triforce. After Link and his companion Midna defeat Zant, they face Ganondorf for the final battle at Hyrule Castle. Ganondorf battles Link by possessing Zelda and using her like a puppet and afterwards transforms into Dark Beast Ganon. After Link slays Ganon, Midna safely transports Link and Zelda to Hyrule field, but Link is forced to again face Ganondorf in his humanoid form. Ganondorf is defeated with the help of Zelda's Light Arrows when Link finally plunges the Master Sword into Ganondorf's chest.

Ganon was replaced by two new antagonists named Ghirahim and Demon King Demise in Skyward Sword. Speaking to Nintendo Power, Eiji Aonuma explained that he wanted a different kind of villain and that Ghirahim was created to contrast with Ganon's "very masculine, powerful, evil" image. Despite his absence, the game suggests that Ganon is a incarnation of Demise's hatred when Link's companion Fi says that Demise is the "source of all monsters". Demise's curse also establishes that Ganon, Link and Zelda are placed in an eternal cycle of conflict. Ganon appears in the final boss battle of A Link Between Worlds. The antagonist Yuga summons him from his seal with the power of the Seven Sages and fuses with Ganon to become a massive creature called Yuga Ganon.

In Breath of the Wild, Ganon gives into malice and hatred to become the malevolent force called Calamity Ganon. In the backstory, he returns from an earlier defeat to take control of an army of Guardian robots, which he uses against the Hyruleans with the aim of destroying Hyrule. Using his Blight Ganon doppelgängers he murders the four Champions who pilot an ancient technology known as the Divine Beasts. He is confined in Hyrule Castle by Zelda's powers until a hundred years later, when Link awakens to prevent his complete destruction of Hyrule.

Ganondorf returns in his humanoid form for the first time since Twilight Princess in Tears of the Kingdom. The game's cutscenes reveal that he is present thousands of years in the past when the first king Rauru founded Hyrule. Rauru sacrifices himself to seal Ganondorf beneath Hyrule Castle, where his corpse rots for thousands of years. He is reawakened in the present when Link and Zelda investigate the depths of Hyrule Castle and, in the confrontation, his power breaks the Master Sword. In the final boss fight, which takes place deep in the chasm beneath Hyrule Castle, he regenerates into his Demon King form. After the initial fight, he uses his Secret Stone to transform into the Demon Dragon, pulling Link into the sky, and is destroyed with the help of the Light Dragon.

Echoes of Wisdom, the first mainline Zelda game to feature Zelda rather than Link as the player character, begins with a sequence in which Link saves Zelda from an Echo of Ganon but is sucked through a rift into the still world, and Ganon vanishes. An Echo of Ganon also appears as the boss of Hyrule Castle dungeon halfway through the game.

=== Other video games ===
Ganon makes an appearance in Zelda no Densetsu: Kamigami no Triforce for Barcode Battler II. The game was released by Epoch Co. and involves scanning barcodes to battle enemies on cards with a story based on A Link to the Past. He also appears in his "demon boar" form in the CD-i Zelda titles: Link: The Faces of Evil and Zelda: The Wand of Gamelon. The games center on Ganon attacking the worlds of Koridai and Gamelon. In Zelda's Adventure, he takes over the kingdom of Tolemac and captures Link.

Ganondorf made his first appearance in the Super Smash Bros. series in his Ocarina of Time design as a playable character in Super Smash Bros. Melee. He reappears in all subsequent installments, including Brawl, Super Smash Bros. for Nintendo 3DS and Wii U and Ultimate. In Melee, Ganondorf's moveset is a version of Captain Falcon's and his Warlock Punch was based on the Falcon Punch. For Brawl, his design was based on his appearance in Twilight Princess. He also appears in the single-player The Subspace Emissary story mode. In Ultimate, his design resembles his Ocarina of Time appearance. He transforms into his beast form for his final smash. As one of the bosses of Ultimate, he takes the form of Demon King Ganon, wielding two swords and combining his attacks with dark magic.

Ganondorf appears as a playable character in the Zelda spin-off title Hyrule Warriors. He can also be customised with several outfits, including his Demon King costume set. Calamity Ganon appears in the next entry, Hyrule Warriors: Age of Calamity. In addition to being the main antagonist of the game, he can also be unlocked as a playable character at the end of the game after the player completes all of the challenges.

Ganon can be summoned into a player's village in Animal Crossing: New Leaf by scanning a compatible amiibo that was released for the 30th anniversary of The Legend of Zelda series. Ganondorf is available as an unlockable "Mystery Mushroom" costume in Super Mario Maker. He is also playable in the Nintendo Switch version of Diablo III: Eternal Collection, with the Switch version of the game exclusively offering amiibo support and additional content based on The Legend of Zelda series. Ganon also makes a cameo appearance alongside Link in Scribblenauts Unlimited.

In the rhythm game Cadence of Hyrule Ganon is the final boss. The storyline involves Link, Zelda and Cadence searching for four magic instruments to defeat him.

=== Television series ===
Ganon appears as the main villain of The Legend of Zelda cartoon, which was shown as part of The Super Mario Bros. Super Show! in 1989. Ganon is a brown-skinned anthropomorphic boar and wizard with a squeally voice. He is in possession of the Triforce of Power and spends each episode plotting to steal the Triforce of Wisdom and take over Hyrule. His plan is usually thwarted by Link and Zelda by the end of the episode. He was voiced by Len Carlson.

He also appears in Captain N: The Game Master, in which he is defeated by Link using a mirror shield.

In the South Park episode "Imaginationland Episode III", Ganondorf makes an appearance in his Ocarina of Time incarnation as one of many evil characters battling the good characters.

=== Comics and manga ===
Alongside Zelda and Link, Ganon appears in a Choose Your Own Adventure style of manga titled The Legend of Zelda: The Mirage Castle, which was published just after the first game in 1986 and includes some scrapped concepts such as Ganon's younger brother named Demon General Gaia. The Legend of Zelda comic series published in the 1990s by Valiant Comics was based on The Legend of Zelda games and featured Ganon as an antagonist in the stories and bonus stories. Ganon appears in The Legend of Zelda manga. In the Ocarina of Time manga, which was originally published in two volumes and written by Akira Himekawa, the storyline provides additional details to the game's plot in which Link defeats Ganondorf and restores peace to Hyrule.

== Merchandise ==
Ganondorf was recreated as a figure that was bundled with a limited edition of physical copies of The Wind Waker HD in 2013. In September 2015, Nintendo released an amiibo of Ganondorf, which was primarily associated with Super Smash Bros. for Nintendo 3DS and Wii U. Following the release of Tears of the Kingdom, a compatible Ganondorf amiibo was released in November 2023. His image has also appeared on other official merchandise, including a "Power" t-shirt that was released for a Triforce-themed Splatfest held in Splatoon 3 in May 2023. A Lego set released in 2026, based on the final battle from Ocarina of Time, features a Lego minifigure of Ganondorf and a brick-built large figure of Ganon in his monstrous boar form.

== Reception and legacy ==
Ganon was one of the first villains in video game history and has been described by critics, including Guinness World Records 2013 Gamer's Edition as one of the greatest video game villains. Aaron Greenbaum, writing for Den of Geek, remarked that throughout the series there have been confusing shifts between the characterisation of Ganon and his humanoid counterpart. He noted that in the original game and again in Ocarina of Time, Ganon appears as a mute monster with no dialogue or personality and only exists for the purposes of the gameplay, while in other games his portrayal shifts around. This contrasts with Ganondorf's intelligence and egomaniacal nature, which is emphasised each time the player interacts with him. Jay Castello, writing for Polygon, considered Ganondorf's depiction as an evil character who originates from the desert to have racist undertones that have underpinned his backstory throughout the series. Ollie Reynolds of Nintendo Life considered Ganondorf's introduction in Ocarina of Time to be one of the best in gaming and said that, despite being on screen for just a few seconds, his entrance is so well crafted it immediately creates trepidation.

Following a demo at Space World 2000, IGN responded to Ganondorf's character model, highlighting his battle-worn sword and noting that his face was an improvement on the N64 model and represented "the pure evil within". The demo was cancelled by Nintendo and replaced by The Wind Waker demo at Space World 2001. Jose Oteru of IGN praised Ganondorf's Wind Waker design, noting its samurai-esque and Eastern influences and describing it as a "visual foil to all of the pirates and sea-driven art direction". He opined that these small design details help to give the character personality. Oli Welsh, writing for Eurogamer, said that the dialogue in the final scenes of The Wind Waker expresses Ganondorf's motivations and results in a more human villain to which players can more easily relate. GameSpot's Rob Crossley appreciated the imaginative characterisation of Ganondorf's sidekick Zant in Twilight Princess. While he thought that Nintendo was engaging in "fan service" when they had Ganondorf replace Zant, the final battle between Link and Ganondorf was "symbolic and epic". In a review of Breath of the Wild, Kyle Hilliard, writing for Game Informer, considered that Calamity Ganon's threatening presence, seen from any vantage point in the game's world, creates a tangible goal that makes the final effort to defeat him seem like "the culmination of a lifetime of preparation" and makes the finale more rewarding.

Ganondorf's design in The Legend of Zelda: Tears of the Kingdom received widespread praise from critics and gamers.

Anticipation grew for the return of Ganondorf with the release of the third trailer for Tears of the Kingdom in April 2023, due to him being absent for almost 17 years since Twilight Princess. This incarnation of Ganondorf received widespread praise for his sex appeal, with Jenni Lada of Siliconera commenting that this added more mystery to the character by making him appear "charismatic and charming" rather than just an evil villain. Carolyn Petit of Kotaku considered Ganondorf's characterisation in Tears of the Kingdom to be disappointing, describing him as a "one-note character...without any real character or moral texture". She opined that this results in the game squandering the sense of loss that resonates at its beginning and is in contrast to his more compelling appearance in The Wind Waker. Jim Norman of Nintendo Life thought that Nintendo needs to do more with Ganondorf's character depth, as his appearances throughout the series follow a common narrative structure where he is largely absent until the final battle.

The boss fights between Link and Ganon have received a mixed reception. Mark Langshaw of Digital Spy considered Ocarina of Time to be one of the most memorable boss battles in gaming, commenting that the dual contest against Ganondorf and Ganon offers "two epic boss battles for the price of one". Chris Freiburg for Den of Geek also chose it as the best boss fight, describing Ganon as "a towering pig beast wielding two massive swords in an arena surrounded by a ring of fire" and opined, "it's hard not to consider it the best boss fight in franchise history". Brian Shea, writing for Game Informer, chose the boss battle in The Wind Waker as the greatest moment, stating the final blow "is in stark contrast to the cute cel-shaded visual style in the best way possible", which "delivers players one of the most memorable final sequences in gaming". Marco Vito Oddo of Collider also considered this as the best Ganondorf duel and compared it to the final boss battle in Breath of the Wild, which he described as "another giant blob of dark energy that fights just like every other Ganon Blight the player already fought and defeated" and "an unsatisfactory ending to a fantastic game". Julian Benson of TechRadar noted the extreme difficulty of the final boss fight against Demon King Ganondorf in Tears of the Kingdom, but felt that the game does not prepare the player with the right skillset to successfully defeat him, resulting in him being "the wrong final boss" for the finale.

== See also ==
- Characters of The Legend of Zelda
