= 2Z =

2Z or 2-Z may refer to:

- Play 2Z; see Nickelodeon Games and Sports for Kids
- 2Z, the IATA code of Voepass Linhas Aéreas
- 2-Z (album), by Matthew Shipp

== See also ==
- Z2 (disambiguation)
