= The Legend of Zelda CD-i games =

Video games released in 1993–94

In the 1990s, Philips Interactive Media published three action-adventure games based on Nintendo's Legend of Zelda franchise for its Compact Disc-Interactive (CD-i) players. The first two, Link: The Faces of Evil and Zelda: The Wand of Gamelon, were developed by Animation Magic and released simultaneously on October 10, 1993, and Zelda's Adventure was developed by Viridis and released on May 10, 1996. The two latter entries are the first to feature Princess Zelda as the protagonist instead of Link. Faces of Evil and Wand of Gamelon use the side-scrolling view introduced in Zelda II: The Adventure of Link (1987), while Zelda's Adventure has a top-down view reminiscent of the original 1986 game. All three are non-canon to the Zelda franchise.

Faces of Evil, Wand of Gamelon, and Zelda's Adventure were created after Philips secured the rights to use Nintendo characters in CD-i games. They received little funding and development time, with Nintendo providing only cursory input. All three also dealt with the technical limitations of the CD-i due to it not being designed as a game console. On Philips' insistence, the games featured the CD-i's capabilities, including full-motion video (FMV) cinematics. The FMVs of Faces of Evil and Wand of Gamelon were animated, while Zelda's Adventure used live-action FMVs.

Concurrent with the low sales of CD-i hardware, the three games were not commercially successful. Faces of Evil and Wand of Gamelon received mixed reviews at the time of their release, whereas reception to Zelda's Adventure was mostly negative. Retrospective reviews, however, have panned all three for their unintuitive level design and awkward control schemes. The FMVs of Faces of Evil and Wand of Gamelon also received renewed criticism for their rough animation quality after they became widely available through video-sharing websites such as YouTube. Edge noted that Zelda fans consider the CD-i games "tantamount to blasphemy".

== History ==
Release timeline 1986-1998: CD-i games are in bold
1986	The Legend of Zelda (NES)
1987	The Adventure of Link (NES)
1988
1989
1990
1991	A Link to the Past (SNES)
1992
1993	Link's Awakening (GB)
1993	**Link: The Faces of Evil**
1993	**Zelda: The Wand of Gamelon**
1994
1995
1996	**Zelda's Adventure**
1997
1998	Ocarina of Time (N64)
1998	Link's Awakening DX (GBC)

In 1989, Nintendo signed a deal with Sony to begin development of a CD-ROM-based system known as the SNES-CD (also known as the "Nintendo Play Station", with separated words) to be an add-on to the Super Nintendo Entertainment System that would allow for FMV and larger games. However, Nintendo broke the agreement and instead signed with Philips to make the add-on, which caused Sony to spin off their add-on into its own console called the PlayStation (with "PlayStation" stylized as one word rather than "Play Station" of the logo on the unreleased Super Famicom & CD-ROM combination unit.). After the poor reception of the Sega Mega-CD, Nintendo scrapped the idea of making an add-on entirely. As part of dissolving the agreement with Philips, Nintendo gave them the license to use several of their characters, including Link, Princess Zelda, and Ganon, for games on Philips's CD-i hardware format, after the partnership's dissolution.

Contracting out to independent studios, Philips subsequently used the characters to create three games for CD-i, with Nintendo taking no part in their development except to give input on the look of the characters based on the artwork from Nintendo's original two titles and that of their respective instruction booklets. Philips insisted that the development studios utilize all aspects of the CD-i's capabilities including FMV, high-resolution graphics, and CD-quality music. Because the system had not been designed as a dedicated video game console, there were several technical limitations, such as laggy controls (especially for the standard infrared controller), and numerous problems in streaming-audio, memory, disc access, and graphics.

The first two games were showcased at the 1993 CES and surprised audiences with their degree of animation. All the CD-i games in The Legend of Zelda series were released after Link's Awakening but before Ocarina of Time, as illustrated in the timeline with the relevant games being in bold.

== Casting ==
The majority of actors chosen for the series lived in Newburyport, Massachusetts. Jeffrey Rath and Bonnie Jean Wilbur were cast as Link and Zelda, while Mark Berry played Ganon. Wilbur's husband Paul Wann played various characters as well. The recording sessions were done in Boston and Cambridge, Massachusetts. Rath and Wilbur later acknowledged in interviews that they did not see the finished product until years later.

== Video games ==
=== Link: The Faces of Evil ===
Paired with Zelda: Wand of Gamelon in a simultaneous release, Link: The Faces of Evil represents the first of the Zelda games to be released by Philips on the CD-i format. Following the traditional Link-saves-Zelda plotline, Faces of Evil was patterned most closely upon Nintendo's previous side-scroller, Zelda II: The Adventure of Link. The game broke new ground in the video game industry by using outsourced Russian animation to create all cutscenes, and the game received mixed contemporary reception. Modern criticism is almost universal in its harsh negativity toward the game and the animated cutscenes have become particular targets of derision.

=== Zelda: The Wand of Gamelon ===
Reversing the traditional Link-saves-Zelda plotline, Wand of Gamelon stars Zelda as she adventures to rescue Link and her father, the king, who have not returned from their quest. As with Faces of Evil, the game was patterned most closely upon Nintendo's previous side-scroller, Zelda II: The Adventure of Link, and again features outsourced Russian animation for all cutscenes. Despite the game's similarly mixed contemporary reception along with Faces of Evil, modern critics have almost unanimously derided and ridiculed the game for its inability to live up to modern expectations with the animated cutscenes again having become a particular target of negative reception.

=== Zelda's Adventure ===
Released nearly eight months after the first two Zelda CD-i games, Zelda's Adventure was created by a different third-party developer, Viridis. The game again follows a nontraditional Zelda-saves-Link plotline, but it uses a different game engine than Faces of Evil and Wand of Gamelon. Whereas the first two CD-i games were patterned on the side-scrolling Zelda II: The Adventure of Link, Zelda's Adventure took the top-down The Legend of Zelda as its model. Zelda's Adventure featured FMV cutscenes, but rather than using drawn animation, the game used live-action scenes. Reception for the game was poor, and whereas some modern critics have given more nuanced reviews of the first two games, modern criticism for Zelda's Adventure is unanimously negative.
