= Zelda's Adventure =

1996 video game

- Box art for Zelda's Adventure
- Developer: Viridis Corporation
- Publisher: Philips Interactive Media
- Director: Anna Roth
- Designers: Lee Barnes; Christopher Thompson
- Series: The Legend of Zelda
- Platform: Philips CD-i
- Release: EU: May 10, 1996
- Genre: Action-adventure
- Mode: Single-player

Zelda's Adventure is an action-adventure game developed by Viridis Corporation and released on the CD-i format, based on The Legend of Zelda franchise. Set in the land of Tolemac, the game follows a non-traditional storyline, in which Link has been captured by the evil lord Ganon, and Zelda must collect the seven celestial signs in order to rescue him.

Released seven months after the first two Zelda CD-i games, Zelda's Adventure uses a different game engine from Faces of Evil and Wand of Gamelon. Whereas the first two CD-i games were patterned on the side-scrolling Zelda II: The Adventure of Link, Zelda's Adventure took top-down perspective from The Legend of Zelda, A Link to the Past, and Link's Awakening as its models. Zelda's Adventure is also the only Legend of Zelda game to feature live action full-motion video sequences, which is deep contrast to its predecessors that had traditional animation. Reception for the game was negative, and whereas some critics have given more nuanced reviews of the first two games, Zelda's Adventure is regarded as one of the worst video games ever made.

== Gameplay ==
Gameplay screenshot

Unlike the previous two CD-i Zelda games, which take the side-scrolling view from Zelda II, Zelda's Adventure is played with the overhead view found in The Legend of Zelda. Playing as Princess Zelda, the aim is to fight through the Seven Shrines of the Underworld to collect the celestial signs, and bring the land of Tolemac to an Age of Lightness.

Unlike the other two games, Zelda's Adventure was created by Viridis, an entirely different company, with a change in style and gameplay. Level design is very much like the original The Legend of Zelda and A Link to the Past, with an overworld that allows access to individual dungeons. The FMV sequences that present the plot are live action instead of animated.

== Plot ==
Ganon has kidnapped Link and stolen the seven celestial signs, creating an "Age of Darkness" in the kingdom of Tolemac (Camelot spelled backwards). Princess Zelda (Diane Burns, Annie Ward) is recruited by the court astrologer Gaspra (Mark Andrade in costume, voice dubbed by Hal Smith in his final acting role) to collect the signs to defeat Ganon and save Link.

Guided by the words of Shurmak, Zelda must first travel through the forest to the Shrine of Rock, where she encounters Llort, a greedy minion of Ganon who protects the first celestial sign. Gaspra appears to congratulate Zelda and direct her to the Shrine of Illusion where she faces Pasquinade to earn the second celestial sign. Guided by the inhabitants of Tolemac, Zelda then makes her way to the mountains to conquer the Shrines of Air and Destiny before crossing the great south sea to challenge Agwanda at the Shrine of Water for the fifth sign. Gaspra directs Zelda once more to the Shrine of Power in the southeast where her strength is tested, before traveling to the Shrine of Fire where she will face Warbane. As Zelda reaches to collect the final celestial sign Ganon's claw stops her, and she is drawn into his lair for the final battle.

In the game's final scenes, peace returns to Tolemac. Link is revealed to be safe, holding hands with Zelda where the entrance to Ganon's lair once stood, the land now thriving with new growth and Gaspra praises Zelda for saving Tolemac from Ganon and restoring peace and prosperity.

== Development ==
In 1989, Nintendo signed a deal with Sony to begin development of a CD-ROM-based system known as the "Nintendo PlayStation" or the SNES CD to be an add-on to the Super Nintendo Entertainment System that would allow for FMV and larger games. However, Nintendo broke the agreement and instead signed with Philips to make the add-on, which caused Sony to spin off their add-on into its own console called the PlayStation. Witnessing the poor critical reception of the Sega Mega-CD, Nintendo decided to scrap the idea of making an add-on entirely. As part of dissolving the agreement with Philips, Nintendo gave them the license to use five of their characters, including Link, Princess Zelda, and Ganon, for games on Philips's console called the CD-i, after the partnership's dissolution. Contracting out to independent studios, Philips subsequently used the characters to create three games for the CD-i, with Nintendo taking no part in their development except to give input on the look of the characters based on the artwork from Nintendo's original two titles and that of their respective instruction booklets. Philips insisted that the development studios utilize all aspects of the CD-i's capabilities including FMV, high-resolution graphics, and CD-quality music. Because the system had not been designed as a dedicated video game console, there were several technical limitations, such as laggy controls (especially for the standard infrared controller), and numerous problems in streaming-audio, memory, disc access, and graphics. Viridis was tasked with observing A Link to the Past and basing Zelda's Adventure's gameplay on it, though was told to still show off the CD-i's capabilities, meaning that the game still used Redbook audio and animated cutscenes.

The backgrounds for Zelda's Adventure were created from videos of scenery near Santa Monica Boulevard in West Los Angeles, footage of Hawaii taken from a helicopter and the developers' vacation photos. This decision was responsible for much of the game's RAM usage, causing backgrounds to scroll slowly and causing extreme frustration to the game's developers. The CD-i's technical abilities were so limited that the use of one or two kilobytes of system RAM caused arguments amongst the developers. Photos of the characters were shot using mirrors mounted on the ceiling, which was so low it precluded mounting the camera. All of the game's human characters were portrayed by the in-office staff. The character's sprite walking animations were done by having the actors walk on a motorized treadmill. The game's music composer, Mark Andrade also physically portrayed the part of Gaspra in the game's cutscenes, while his voice was dubbed by The Andy Griffith Show star, Hal Smith which was Hal Smith's final voice acting role before his death in 1994. Zelda in the game's opening cutscene was played by office receptionist Diane Burns due to the game's alleged low budget, while in other cutscenes as well in-game she was portrayed by Annie Ward. The houses and interiors built for the cut scenes were built as scale models. Non-human characters were created using clay models and being animated in stop motion animation. The model artist was Jason Bakutis, who had worked in Hollywood on movies like Critters 3 and Freddy's Dead: The Final Nightmare. Developers have stated they were not influenced by the first two CD-i Zelda games. Zelda's Adventure spent two years in testing, longer than it took to develop the game. Much more music was composed for the game than was used. Developers had difficulty making sure all the areas of the game had proper background masking. There were plans at one point to hire Echo & the Bunnymen to do the music.

Intending to push the capacities of the CD-i to its limits, development initially progressed with a goal of 600 screens and 160 NPCs. At this early stage, Viridis president Lee Barnes suggested that playthrough time might take as much as 300 hours. These development figures were reduced in the final product which had only a handful of NPCs and whose playthrough time has been placed by one commentator at only 12 hours.

The majority of the game's programming was done by one person—Randy Casey, who was responsible for programming all of the game and all associated tools. Additional programming for the inventory system and game progress tracking, dubbed "FRP engine", was done by Gavin James. There is conflicting information about the game's budget—one developer claims there was "no budget at all" while Bakutis claims (likely erroneously) it had "at the time, the biggest budget ever for a video game".

== Reception ==
Reception

Review score
Publication	Score
CD-i	84%

Zelda's Adventure was widely panned by critics. The graphics of Zelda's Adventure were called "blurry and digitized". Wired magazine said that the graphics were some of the worst ever encountered. The game's acting was criticized as unprofessional. Another flaw that has been identified is that the game could not produce both sound effects and music at the same time. Scott Sharkey of 1UP.com called the box art of Zelda's Adventure one of the 15 worst ever made. Zelda's Adventure released around the time the Philips CD-i was being discontinued and it has become very rare over time, as have the first two Philips Zelda games; authentic copies of the game are typically sold for over US$100.

Despite having positive opinions on The Faces of Evil and The Wand of Gamelon, both Danny Cowan from 1UP.com and John Szczepaniak from Retro Gamer were very critical of Zelda's Adventure, with Szczepaniak claiming it has "the most arbitrary and illogical designs ever seen in a videogame" and giving emphasis to its messy graphics, nearly absent music, unfair difficulty, lengthy loading times and awkward controls. He also described Zelda's Adventure's gameplay as eventually devolving into trial-and-error due to its items being either nearly useless or mandatory for certain enemies, with little to no distinction between the two. Cowan labeled Zelda's Adventure as "practically unplayable" due to its inconsistent frame rate, unresponsive controls and long load times, closing his review by telling the readers to "avoid the game at all costs". USgamer staff ranked Zelda's Adventure as the second worst Zelda game in their July 2018 ranking of the series, noting that it was separated from Faces of Evil and Wand of Gamelon due to being "merely terrible" compared to the previous two. They considered it a "well-meaning attempt" to replicate the original The Legend of Zelda's design, as well as acknowledging that it is one of few games to have Zelda as the main player character, but recognized that the developers' lack of experience as well as the CD-i's limitations made the game an experience that is "dreadful, but not entirely without merit." IGN writer Peer Schneider was initially excited that the game was not made by Animation Magic like the previous two, but despite being a "marked improvement over the other two CD-i games", he did not consider the game worth buying and playing "unless [the reader is] a die-hard Zelda fan and paraphernalia collector".

== Legacy ==
In April 2023, indie developer John Lay released an unofficial port of Zelda's Adventure for the Game Boy, made using GB Studio and published on itch.io. In November 2025, Lay released a major update for his fan demake (version 2.0.0), rebranding it as Zelda's Adventure DX. The update added colors, sound effects and compatibility with the Game Boy Color.
