= Chip shortage =

Decrease in integrated circuit availability

A chip shortage, also referred to as semiconductor shortage or chip famine, is a phenomenon in the integrated circuit (chip) industry when demand for silicon chips outstrips supply.

== Introduction ==
A chip shortage typically occurs when there is some sociological or physical change that prevented certain chips from being produced in large enough numbers to satisfy demand. A severe case of chip shortage occurred in 1988 after a pact between American and Japanese chip manufacturers resulted in severely reduced production. Changing to newer production methods also causes chip shortages as the new factories are not built quickly enough to meet the demand for the newer chips. Examples are the shortage of smart card chips in 1999 and the rationing of other types of chips in 2004. The 2011 Japanese earthquake led to a period when it was difficult to source all the parts needed for various systems.

Chip shortages can have a major effect on the electronics industry where manufacturers change their sourcing of chips and suffer major loss of profits, such as when PC manufacturer Gateway switched from Intel to AMD microprocessors in 2000. Some manufacturers may find themselves having to redesign their products to account for the shortage of certain chips, or having to leave design options open to allow alternative chips to be incorporated into the design.

== Cases of shortages ==
The 1986 American-Japanese semiconductor trade pact was designed to help U.S. chip manufacturers compete with Japanese companies. This resulted in severe cuts in Japanese production. However, it had unintended consequences. The pact called for Japanese companies to stop selling chips below cost, or dumping, which led to the companies producing and exporting fewer chips, the root cause of the dumping. In 1988, American companies did not reenter the market as expected due to the high cost of production and risk.

In 1988, there was a shortage due to high demand. Workers at seven Hitachi factories had to work through their summer vacations to meet demand. In 1994, there was a shortage due to new technologies being developed. The newer manufacturing processes required significantly cleaner "clean rooms" and many batches of integrated circuits were discarded due to manufacturing errors.

In 2000, Intel suffered a shortage of several products. Larger companies were able to receive the products they needed but smaller companies such as Gateway had to wait or find other chips.

There was a lack of CDMA chips in 2004. This was due to the strong push of mobile phone companies to introduce and establish CDMA in both the United States and India.

After the 2011 earthquake in Japan, there was a severe chip shortage of NAND memory and displays.

On April 19, 2012, Qualcomm released a statement that they expected a shortage of their Snapdragon chip due to a lack of facilities to manufacture the 28 nm chip.

=== 2020–2023 global chip shortage ===
From early 2020, the effects of and the mitigation of the COVID-19 pandemic caused disruptions in supply chains and logistics. This was coupled with a 13% increase in global demand for PCs owing to some countries' shift to a stay-at-home economy, and impacted the availability of key chips necessary for the manufacturing of electronics. In 2021, the pandemic's impact on the manufacture of semiconductors in South Korea and Taiwan was cited as a cause for the shortage, with constrained supply impacting industries as broad as console gaming and the automotive industry.

In February 2021, market analysts IHS Markit forecast the impact of the dearth to last through to the third quarter of 2021; lead times on chip supply at this time had already extended to 15 weeks, the longest lead time since 2017. By April 2021, lead times for semiconductors from Broadcom Inc. had "extended to 22.2 weeks, up from 12.2 weeks in February 2020".

As an example of the effects, at the end of Q1 2021, used car prices in some countries were increasing due to the demand from both economic recovery, as well as the chip shortage. The price of some cars increased as much as 10% in Q1.

During the summer of 2021, severe weather events including the droughts in Taiwan were also a significant contributing factor. The droughts affected the production due to the lack of available ultrapure water that is needed to clean the factories and wafers. Other factors cited as contributing to the shortage are the increased popularity of cryptocurrency and the 2022 Russian invasion of Ukraine.

=== 2025–present global memory supply shortage ===
Unlike the 2020–2023 global chip shortage, which stemmed primarily from supply chain disruptions related to the COVID-19 pandemic, this shortage is driven by a structural reallocation of manufacturing capacity toward high-margin products for artificial intelligence infrastructure, creating scarcity in consumer and enterprise PC markets.

== Causes ==
A 1993 dynamic random-access memory (DRAM) chip famine was caused by a factory explosion on July 4 of that year at the factory which produced 60% of the world's supply of resin used in chips. From 1993 to 1994, there was a glut of chips and companies lost incentive to build new leading-edge factories. When the new generations came out, there were not enough factories to produce the new chips.

An earlier chip famine might cause a slump in the market, which would result in fewer chips being manufactured. When the slump is over, the demand might grow too high for the companies to fulfill, resulting in a second shortage.

New generation chips are difficult to produce due to manufacturing capabilities. In many cases batches of product are discarded due to manufacturing defects in the first few runs, resulting in manufacturing capacity that could have gone to producing older chips not being used to ship newer chips either. Furthermore, customers often want the newest chips available and may not be willing to settle for older chips, so companies must wait for newer chips to put into their products.

Conversely, older chips can also be subject to chip shortages. Older chips made on "mature node" equipment can easily go into shortage if demand spikes, because the production lines have already been fully depreciated and optimized. There is no easy way for chip foundries to scale up their production of older chips because the capital costs of setting up or expanding chip production lines are so high that they are economically justifiable only for new lines featuring the latest technology. This is what caused global shortages of older chips in 2021 during the COVID-19 pandemic.

== Effects ==
The 1988 chip famine caused the delay of Zelda II: The Adventure of Link due to a lack of static random-access memory (SRAM).

Shortages of dynamic random-access memory, static random-access memory, and processors led to raises the prices for remaining chips. In 2007, lack of ICs for their Wii console caused the global Wii shortage.

Lack of chips from the COVID supply disruption caused researchers to develop solderless, 3D printable adapters for converting small outline integrated circuit (SOIC) components to be used in dual in-line package (DIP) package circuits (i.e., breadboards, protoboards, etc.). The open-source hardware device, called an additive manufacture breakout board (AMBB) design, provided electronics designers with an increased selection of components for through-hole use by more than a factor of seven.
