= Princess Zelda =

Video game character

- The Legend of Zelda character
- Promotional artwork of Zelda for The Legend of Zelda: A Link to the Past and Four Swords
- First game: The Legend of Zelda (1986)
- Created by: Shigeru Miyamoto
- Designed by: Shigeru Miyamoto
- Voiced by: English: Cyndy Preston (The Legend of Zelda cartoon); Bonnie Jean Wilbur (Link: The Faces of Evil and Zelda: The Wand of Gamelon); Patricia Summersett (Breath of the Wild, Age of Calamity, Tears of the Kingdom, and Age of Imprisonment); Brandy Kopp (Super Smash Bros. Ultimate, World of Light only); Stephanie Marton (Cadence of Hyrule); Erica Mendez (Ocarina of Time (2026) (Note: Zelda, Sheik)); Japanese: Naomi Fujisawa (BS); Mariko Kouda (Sound & Drama and BS Ancient Stone Tablets); Yayoi Nījima (A Link to the Past commercial); Jun Mizusawa (Ocarina of Time, Majora's Mask, Super Smash Bros. Melee, Twilight Princess, Super Smash Bros. Brawl, and Super Smash Bros. for Nintendo 3DS and Wii U); Hikari Tachibana (The Wind Waker, (Note: Tetra, Toon Zelda) Four Swords, Four Swords Adventures, Minish Cap, Phantom Hourglass, (Note: Tetra) and Hyrule Warriors); Akane Omae (Spirit Tracks and Hyrule Warriors (Note: Toon Zelda)); Yū Shimamura (Skyward Sword, Breath of the Wild, Age of Calamity, Tears of the Kingdom, Age of Imprisonment and Ocarina of Time (2026)); Ayumi Fujimura (A Link Between Worlds and Super Smash Bros. Ultimate); Saori Seto (Hyrule Warriors); Chiyuki Miura (Echoes of Wisdom)
- Portrayed by: Diane Burns (Zelda's Adventure); Bo Bragason (2027 film)

In-universe information
- Aliases: Sheik (Ocarina of Time); Tetra (The Wind Waker and Phantom Hourglass)
- Race: Hylian
- Origin: Hyrule

Princess Zelda (Note: Japanese: ゼルダ姫, Hepburn: Zeruda-hime) is a character in the Legend of Zelda video game series by Nintendo. She was created by Shigeru Miyamoto for the original 1986 game The Legend of Zelda. She has appeared in the majority of the games in various incarnations. Zelda is the elf-like Hylian princess of the kingdom of Hyrule, an associate of the series main protagonist Link, and bearer of the Triforce of Wisdom.

Zelda's role has often been that of a damsel in distress or donor who assists Link. In many games, she is captured by the series main antagonist Ganon, necessitating Link to come to her rescue. In several games she is one of the Sages whose heroism is essential to defeating Ganon; in others, like Ocarina of Time and The Wind Waker, she adopts alternative personas to take a more active role in the story. In Skyward Sword, her first incarnation is revealed to be the mortal reincarnation of the goddess Hylia, establishing the bloodline of the goddess and giving her descendants a range of magical powers. In Echoes of Wisdom, she is featured as the playable protagonist.

Zelda has been described as one of the most recognisable princesses in video gaming. She has appeared in branded merchandise, comics and manga, and an animated television series. In addition to The Legend of Zelda series, she has appeared as a playable character in a number of spin-off games and other game series, including Hyrule Warriors, Cadence of Hyrule, Hyrule Warriors: Age of Calamity, Hyrule Warriors: Age of Imprisonment, and the Super Smash Bros. series. Critics have responded positively to her development into a strong female character and have listed her as one of the greatest female video game characters of all time.

== Concept and creation ==
=== Characterisation ===
According to Shigeru Miyamoto, co-creator of The Legend of Zelda series, Princess Zelda's name was inspired by Zelda Fitzgerald, an American novelist, dancer, and socialite, as well as the wife of fellow novelist F. Scott Fitzgerald. Miyamoto had decided to name the first game "The Legend of X", but did not know what the X would stand for. He said that a public relations planner had suggested the name when proposing an illustrated story for the game involving the rescue of a princess who was defined as an eternal beauty. Miyamoto explained: "I couldn't really get behind the book idea but I really liked the name Zelda. I asked him if I could use it, and he said that would be fine. And that's where the title The Legend of Zelda was born."

Zelda was established as a princess in the first game, with few details given about the Royal Family of Hyrule until later games. She is a princess in most games except in Skyward Sword, which takes place before the founding of Hyrule Kingdom. Like Link, there are multiple incarnations of Princess Zelda in the series who are all connected by The Legend of Zelda timeline, which spans thousands of years of fictional history. Each version of Princess Zelda is a descendant of the first who founded the royal line and Hyrule. The instruction booklet for Zelda II: The Adventure of Link establishes that Zelda's name reoccurs because the prince of the kingdom orders that "every female child born into the royal household shall be given the name Zelda".

Zelda in disguise as Sheik in Ocarina of Time

In Ocarina of Time, Zelda's role was expanded by giving her an alter ego as a surviving member of the Sheikah clan named Sheik (シーク, Shīku). To hide from Ganondorf and protect the Triforce of Wisdom, she disguises herself as a ninja warrior. During the game, she acts as a guide and helps Link on his quest to defeat Ganondorf until near the end of the game when she reveals herself to be Zelda. Sheik's gender was the subject of debate, with some fans believing that Zelda transforms herself into a male character in Ocarina of Time. Nintendo senior product marketing manager Bill Trinen responded that Sheik is a woman: "simply Zelda in a different outfit". In 2016, Miyamoto revealed in an interview that the development team had considered the possibility of producing a spin-off game with Sheik as the protagonist. A game starring Sheik was reported to be in development at Retro Studios but was eventually cancelled.

Zelda appears as a pirate captain named Tetra in The Wind Waker.

Another alter ego of Zelda named Tetra (テトラ, Tetora) was introduced in The Wind Waker and its Nintendo DS sequel, Phantom Hourglass. Like Sheik, she plays a major role in the storyline as a young pirate captain who helps Link to find his younger sister, Aryll. In this incarnation, Zelda is unaware of her royal bloodline until the end of the game. Her true identity is revealed when the Triforce of Wisdom is restored, which results in her physical transformation to her Princess Zelda form. Phantom Hourglass is set some time after the events of The Wind Waker with Link and Tetra exploring the Great Sea to find a new land. Tetra is captured on a Ghost Ship, and Link must defeat the Evil Phantom Bellum with the Phantom Sword to save her. In a 2011 interview with GamesRadar+, series producer Eiji Aonuma commented on the possibility of Tetra reappearing within the Zelda series: "Personally, I really like the character, but the director on the DS games after that, Mr. Iwamoto, said he didn't really like her, so he didn't want to use her".

Zelda was given a more active role in Spirit Tracks as Tetra's great-great-granddaughter by adventuring alongside the new Link in spirit form, which made a sharp contrast to her damsel in distress role in earlier installments. Aonuma explained that this decision reflected the desires of fans and developers alike. A survey conducted in the United States signified consumers preferred more independent female characters, including Zelda's alter egos Sheik and Tetra. Director, Daiki Iwamoto, also expressed an interest in making Zelda "a more integral part of the game" during the game's development.

The character's significance within the mythology of the series was expanded further in Skyward Sword, where the first incarnation of Zelda is established as the mortal reincarnation of the goddess Hylia, a recurring deity worshiped by the Hylians that appears in statue form. Aonuma said that his team had been looking at how to portray Zelda more as the title character rather than just a princess to be rescued and wanted to give her an active role in the story. He also said that by establishing a connection between Zelda and Link, it helps the player to be better immersed in the adventure.

Aonuma said that for Breath of the Wild, Zelda was designed to be "complex and multifaceted". He said that he wanted players to "explore and see these different sides of Zelda, different emotions that she evokes". During development, the team briefly considered giving Zelda the lead role as female protagonist. Director Hidemaro Fujibayashi said that in Tears of the Kingdom her character development is a key aspect of the narrative: "She's going through growth, experiencing things, and ultimately figuring out what kind of a person she's going to be."

With the development of Echoes of Wisdom, Zelda was given the role of protagonist for the first time in a mainline Zelda game, although it was originally intended for Link. Aonuma recognised that players wanted a playable Zelda and decided that she was the ideal character for the game's echoes concept. Despite feeling that this would do justice to the character, the development team struggled to find the right story and brainstormed ideas to explain Zelda's motivations for embarking on the adventure.

=== Character design ===
Zelda was depicted in promotional artwork for the original The Legend of Zelda video game as a princess wearing a pink gown.

Official artwork created for the original game depicted the character dressed in a long pink gown wearing a necklace and tiara. Artwork for Zelda II: The Adventure of Link was similar and depicted her with red hair. For the development of A Link to the Past, Zelda was originally designed wearing a sci-fi themed outfit to correspond with an early multi-world game concept, but this was eventually scrapped. For Ocarina of Time her royal dress was designed with a tabard featuring the Sheikah coat of arms and the Hyrule royal family crest.

In the anime-inspired video game The Wind Waker, Tetra's hair was designed as a swirl to mimic the wind and smoke in the game. Her alter ego contrasts with Zelda's traditional appearance in the game as princess wearing long hair and royal dress.

During the development of Twilight Princess illustrator Yusuke Nakano tried to portray the princess as a pensive character, "as if she's wondering about something". He drew illustrations of Zelda with feelings of "hopelessness and anxiousness", but tried to avoid depicting her and Link "too full of gloom and doom".

In Skyward Sword, Zelda was presented as a student of the Knight Academy instead of her usual role as princess. The designers wanted her to look like a "typical village girl" and aimed to "establish her as a heroine". They removed the royal ornamentation from her head and designed her wearing sky blue and a red dress. They also created Zelda in her goddess Hylia form, in which she was designed, "dressed simply, and in white".

For the release of Breath of the Wild, a variety of concept art was considered for Zelda's character design. Fujibayashi commented that Zelda's character was the most difficult to define because while the planners had approached her by thinking about what kind of person she is, the designers took a different approach and considered how Zelda's design could make players feel. The team was so concerned that they repeatedly made refinements to her design until the end of development. Alongside various dress designs, Zelda's image was updated to include outfits that showed her ready for combat, including the final blue blouse and pants that complemented Link's primary outfit. Fujibayashi said that Zelda's shorter hairstyle in Tears of the Kingdom was designed to make her feel more realistic, due to being actively mobile while restoring the kingdom after Breath of the Wild.

In Echoes of Wisdom, Zelda is the avatar for the player, so Aonuma felt it was necessary to keep her appearance balanced so that she was neither too cute nor conspicuous. The development team at Grezzo spent a long time finalising her appearance to enhance her character appeal. Her facial expressions were designed to match the feelings of the player, so Aonuma made subtle changes to her eyes and mouth so that her face evolves from a serious expression into a smile as the story progresses.

=== Portrayal ===
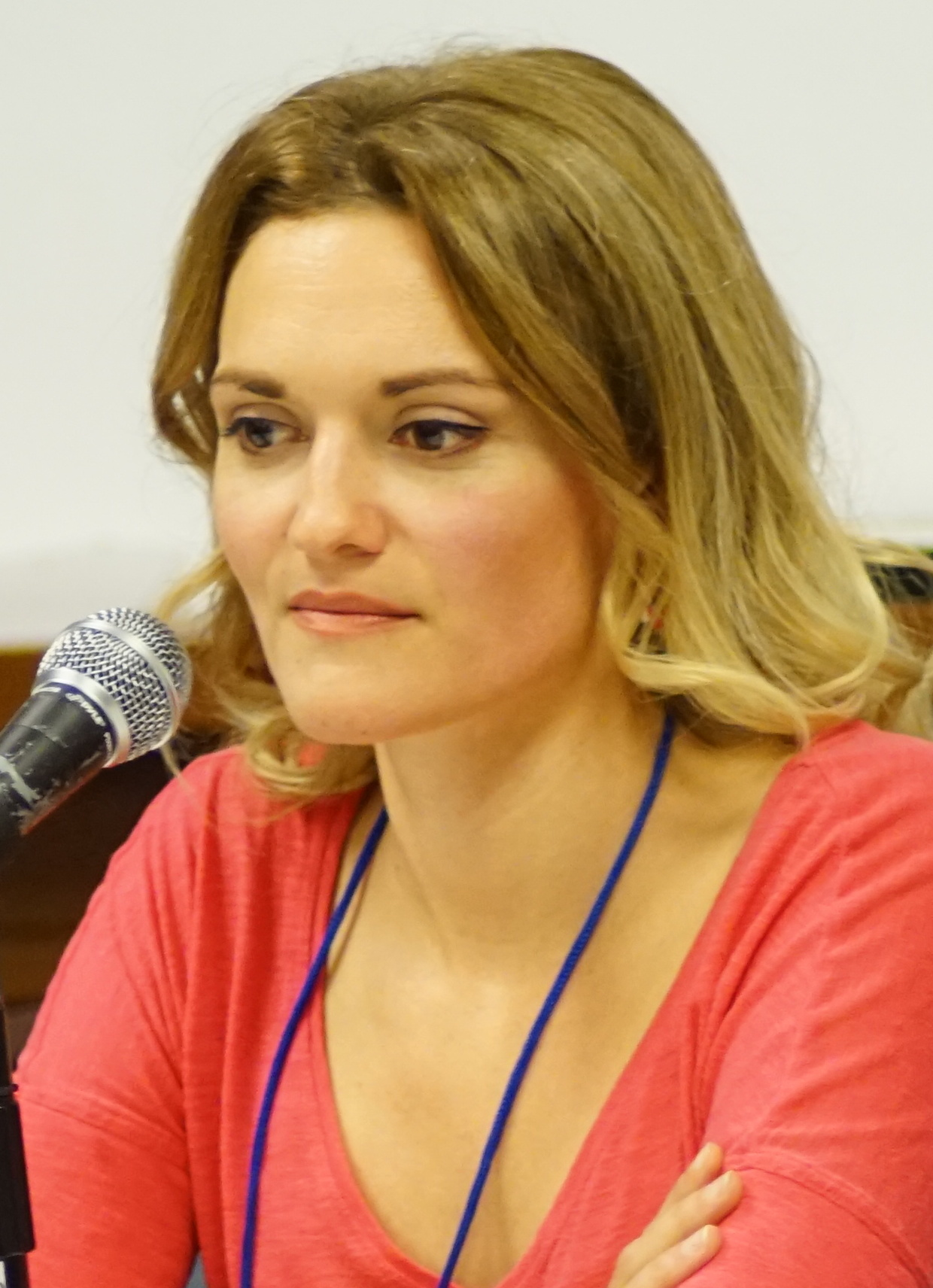
Patricia Summersett provides Princess Zelda's English voice in Legend of Zelda: Breath of the Wild, Hyrule Warriors: Age of Calamity, Legend of Zelda: Tears of the Kingdom, and Hyrule Warriors: Age of Imprisonment.

Princess Zelda has been voiced by several voice actors, including Bonnie Jean Wilbur in Link: The Faces of Evil and Zelda: The Wand of Gamelon, Brandy Kopp in Super Smash Bros. Ultimate (World of Light only) and Stephanie Martone in Cadence of Hyrule. She is voiced by Canadian-American actress Patricia Summersett in Breath of the Wild, Hyrule Warriors: Age of Calamity, Tears of the Kingdom, and Hyrule Warriors: Age of Imprisonment and Erica Mendez in Ocarina of Time (NS2). Zelda has also been voiced by several Japanese actors, including Jun Mizusawa (Ocarina of Time, Twilight Princess, Super Smash Bros. Melee), Hikari Tachibana (Four Swords Adventures, The Wind Waker, Hyrule Warriors), Akane Omae (Spirit Tracks), Ayumi Fujimura (A Link Between Worlds and Super Smash Bros. Ultimate), Saori Seto (Hyrule Warriors) Yū Shimamura (Skyward Sword, Breath of the Wild, Hyrule Warriors: Age of Calamity, Tears of the Kingdom, Hyrule Warriors: Age of Imprisonment, and Ocarina of Time (NS2)). and Chiyuki Miura (Echoes of Wisdom).

In Zelda's Adventure, she was portrayed by a receptionist at the Viridis Corporation named Diane Burns. Zelda will be portrayed by Bo Bragason in the upcoming live-action film.

== Characteristics ==
Zelda is the princess of the royal family of Hyrule. In the early games, her role is the damsel in distress for Link to save after she is kidnapped by the series main antagonist, Ganon. She bears the characteristic traits of the Hylians, having elven features including pointy ears. Throughout the series her age has ranged from a child to a adult who is typically aged 17 years old.

Within the fictional mythology of the series, the first Zelda is the mortal reincarnation of the goddess Hylia. In Skyward Sword, this incarnation of Zelda establishes Hyrule and the bloodline of the Royal Family of Hyrule. Each subsequent incarnation is a direct descendant and possesses the blood of the goddess. Zelda is also associated with Nayru, one of the three Golden Goddesses who create the world in the creation myth of the series. Like Link and Ganon, she is the bearer of one of three components of the Triforce named the Triforce of Wisdom, which gives her the inherent qualities of intelligence and wisdom. In the first game, the Triforce of Wisdom is split into fragments, necessitating Link to retrieve it in order to defeat Ganon. In later games, it manifests itself within Zelda, giving her the ability to conjure light arrows. Most iterations of Zelda have magical powers, such as teleportation, precognition, and the ability to heal.

Throughout the series, Zelda has wielded various weapons. In Twilight Princess she is depicted holding a sword and also fights with a sword in Hyrule Warriors. She is also skilled in the use of a bow, which she uses to shoot light arrows at enemies, such as Ganondorf. In addition to using the Twilight Bow in Twilight Princess, Zelda's signature weapon is the Bow of Light, a recurring legendary weapon in the series.

=== Relationships ===
In the mythology of the series, Zelda's role is directly connected to the other two main characters, Link and Ganon. The trio represent the three virtues of the Triforce, a mysterious artifact and prominent icon that is positioned at the heart of the series, with Link embodying Courage, Ganon representing Power, and Zelda possessing Wisdom. Zelda's relationship with Link is ambiguous, with some games, such as Zelda II: The Adventure of Link, Ocarina of Time and Spirit Tracks hinting at the possibility of a romantic relationship between the two characters. Skyward Sword placed greater emphasis on a romantic relationship in its storyline, illustrated by Nintendo releasing an official "Romance Trailer" for the game. Aonuma explained that originally he planned to cut out any elements of romance from the game but decided to keep it in: "it wasn't that we wanted to create a romance between Link and Zelda as much as we wanted the player to feel like this is a person who's very important to me, who I need to find".

== Appearances ==
=== The Legend of Zelda series ===
Princess Zelda has appeared in most of The Legend of Zelda games, but there have been several games where she does not make an appearance, such as Link's Awakening (1993), Majora's Mask (2000), where she only appears in a flashback, and Tri Force Heroes (2015). Due to being the titular character, it is a common misconception amongst non-players that Zelda is the titular protagonist of the series, when she is almost always a non-playable character.

Zelda made her debut in the original The Legend of Zelda (1986), where she is kidnapped by Ganon, who seeks to steal the Triforce of Wisdom. Before her capture, she scatters the eight pieces of the Triforce of Wisdom across the land and sends her nursemaid Impa to find Link, who eventually rescues her. She returns in the sequel, Zelda II: The Adventure of Link (1987), where Link discovers that she has been cursed into an eternal slumber and can only be revived by the Triforce of Courage. Link breaks the curse by retrieving the Triforce and use its power to awaken her. Zelda rewards Link with a kiss at the end of the game. In A Link to the Past (1991), Zelda is one of seven maidens descended from sages who sealed away Ganon during the Imprisoning War, a battle fought against Ganon's army. After being kidnapped by the dark wizard Agahnim, she telepathically pleads with Link to rescue her. After, she and the other maidens assist Link in breaking the seal on Ganon's tower so that Link may defeat the villain. Zelda initially appears as a child and later as an adult in Ocarina of Time (1998). Suspicious of Ganondorf's intentions, she sends Link on his quest to open the door to the Sacred Realm to obtain the Master Sword and Triforce. When Ganondorf reveals his wicked intentions, Zelda flees Hyrule Castle and goes into hiding, giving Link the Ocarina of Time. Seven years later, she poses as a mysterious Sheikah named Sheik and guides him on his quest to save Hyrule's Sages from Ganondorf.

In Oracle of Seasons and Oracle of Ages (2001), Zelda only appears after inputting a secret code that is obtained upon completion. After sensing danger in the lands of Holodrum and Labrynna, she sends her handmaiden Impa to protect Din and Nayru, the Oracle of Seasons and Ages, respectively. In the full linked game, Zelda is captured by Twinrova, who plans to sacrifice her in order to resurrect Ganon, but Link intervenes and defeats him in the final boss battle. Four Swords (2002) presents Princess Zelda as one of many descendants protecting the seal on the Four Sword. While taking Link to the Four Sword Sanctuary, which seals the evil sorcerer Vaati, she senses the seal's power is diminishing and is captured by Vaati, who takes her to his Palace of Winds to marry her. She is again rescued by Link and they seal Vaati away. Zelda's incarnation in The Wind Waker (2002) is unaware of her royal identity and lives as the pirate captain Tetra. When Link's younger sister Aryll is kidnapped by the Helmaroc King, she agrees to help him explore the islands with her pirate crew. Ganondorf discovers Tetra's true identity when the Triforce of Wisdom is repaired. In the final boss battle against Ganondorf, she assists Link by using his Hero's Bow to shoot Light Arrows. In Four Swords Adventures (2004), Zelda fears Vaati's return and attempts to reseal him. While doing so, Shadow Link captures Zelda and her six maidens. To save them, Link uses the Four Sword but accidentally frees Vaati. After Link rescues Zelda, Ganon is revealed to be behind the plan. Following Vaati's defeat, Zelda helps Link to defeat Ganon by giving him the Magic Bow.

In The Minish Cap (2004), Zelda is petrified by Vaati, who shatters the Picori Sword and breaks the seal, allowing evil to spread across Hyrule. Link is tasked with saving Zelda by restoring the Picori Sword into the Four Sword. Twilight Princess (2006) centers around the Twilight King Zant's invasion of Hyrule, where Zelda is forced to surrender. When Link is transformed into a wolf by the Twilight Realm's power, he and his companion Midna work together to free Hyrule by first defeating Zant and then Ganondorf. Zelda appears as one of the game's bosses, having been possessed by Ganondorf's dark magic. In the final boss battle, she accompanies Link on horseback and helps him in combat by stunning Ganondorf with Light Arrows. Phantom Hourglass (2007) continues Zelda's storyline as Tetra. When she is turned to stone and kidnapped by a Ghost Ship, Link fails to jump overboard and is rescued by a fairy named Ciela. In order to save Tetra, he must sail with Ciela and a sea captain named Linebeck to find the Spirits of Power, Wisdom, and Courage. In Spirit Tracks (2009), Tetra's great-great-granddaughter Zelda meets the new Link at his graduation ceremony as Royal Engineer. After being attacked by villainous Chancellor Cole, her spirit is separated from her body and she accompanies Link on his quest. Spirit Tracks features Zelda as a playable cooperative character. In her spirit form, she can possess Phantom and perform various tasks to help Link restore the Spirit Tracks.

Though not a princess in Skyward Sword (2011), Zelda is presented as the mortal reincarnation of the Goddess Hylia and a close childhood friend to Link. When she is spirited away in a tornado conjured by the Demon Lord Ghirahim, Link travels to the Surface and reunites with her after opening the Gate of Time. Ghirahim drags Zelda to the past and uses her power to release the Demon King Demise to change past events. After Link defeats Demise in battle, he and Zelda remain on the Surface to establish the kingdom of Hyrule. In A Link Between Worlds (2013), Zelda entrusts the Pendant of Courage to Link when the sorcerer Yuga begins capturing the descendants of the Seven Sages. After Yuga turns Zelda into a painting and casts her into the dying world of Lorule, Link follows him into Lorule to rescue Zelda and the sages. Princess Hilda of Lorule conspires with Yuga to steal the Triforce of Wisdom and Triforce of Courage to save her own kingdom, but eventually makes amends by returning Link and Zelda to Hyrule, where they use the Triforce to restore Lorule.

In the backstory of Breath of the Wild (2017), Zelda's story is revealed in a series of Link's memories. When Calamity Ganon attacks Hyrule using ancient Sheikah machinery, Zelda awakens her sacred power while protecting Link, sending him to the Shrine of Resurrection and sealing Calamity Ganon and herself in Hyrule Castle. After a century, she awakens Link and in the final battle, gives him the Bow of Light to defeat Dark Beast Ganon. In the sequel, Tears of the Kingdom (2023), Zelda and Link accidentally awaken the Demon King Ganondorf beneath Hyrule Castle, where she consequently falls into an abyss and disappears into the distant past. In the time of the Zonai, she meets Hyrule's first king Rauru and his first queen wife Sonia, who help her to use her sacred power to restore the decayed Master Sword. Aware of Ganondorf's threat, she sacrifices herself by swallowing a Secret Stone, transforming into the Light Dragon, which provides her with the immortality to return the Master Sword to Link. After Ganondorf's defeat, she is transformed back into a Hylian by the power of time and light.

In Echoes of Wisdom (2024), Zelda is featured as the protagonist. It is the first mainline Zelda game developed by Nintendo to feature Zelda as the player character. Zelda's weapon is the magical Tri Rod and she uses her power of Wisdom to duplicate objects and enemies, called echoes, to fight alongside her. Aided by a fairy named Tri, she can explore Hyrule, recover Link's weapons, and transform into a spectre of Link, which allows her to briefly engage in active combat.

=== Spin-off games ===
Zelda appears in three CD-i games based on The Legend of Zelda series, which were developed out of an agreement between Philips and Nintendo to use Zelda characters on Philips's CD-i format. In Link: The Faces of Evil (1993), she is kidnapped by Ganon and has to be rescued by Link. In Zelda: The Wand of Gamelon (1993) and Zelda's Adventure (1994), Princess Zelda is the protagonist and must save Link. Zelda: The Wand of Gamelon is noteworthy as the first time that Zelda appeared as a playable character. Having been developed with little input from Nintendo, the games have been criticised for their poor story, gameplay and animation and are not recognised by Nintendo as canon.

Zelda is a playable character in Hyrule Warriors (2014) and, according to the game's producer Yosuke Hayashi, was designed to be a stronger character with the feeling of a ruler. Her weapons include a rapier, baton and also the Dominion Rod, which was made available as downloadable content. Sheik is also a playable character and wields daggers and a harp. In addition to her Hyrule Warriors incarnation, Tetra and Toon Zelda (her incarnation from Spirit Tracks) appear in Hyrule Warriors Legends and were added to Hyrule Warriors as downloadable content.

In the rhythm game Cadence of Hyrule, which was released in 2019 for the Nintendo Switch, players can choose to play through the game as either Link or Zelda. The game is a crossover between Crypt of the NecroDancer and The Legend of Zelda series. Zelda has a magical shield to protect her and can use Link's weapons, such as the hookshot and boomerang.

A spiritual successor to Hyrule Warriors, Hyrule Warriors: Age of Calamity, was released in 2020 and designed as a prequel to Breath of the Wild. Princess Zelda is one of several characters from Breath of the Wild that appears as a playable character and fights using the Sheikah Slate and a bow.

=== Other game series ===
Zelda was introduced in the Super Smash Bros. series as a playable character in Super Smash Bros. Melee and has appeared in every subsequent game. In Melee and Super Smash Bros. Brawl, Zelda possesses the ability to transform into Sheik. In Super Smash Bros. for 3DS and Wii U and Super Smash Bros. Ultimate, they are separate characters. In Melee her design was based on her Ocarina of Time incarnation, while in Brawl it was based on her appearance in Twilight Princess. The Twilight Princess incarnation of Zelda returned in Super Smash Bros. for Nintendo 3DS and Wii U. In Ultimate, Sheik's design took inspiration from the Sheikah Set in Breath of the Wild and her final smash is the Sheikah Dance. Zelda's design is based on her appearance in A Link Between Worlds and her final smash is the Triforce of Wisdom.

=== Television series ===
Zelda as seen in The Legend of Zelda animated series

A set of The Legend of Zelda cartoons aired from 1989 to 1990 as a part of DiC's The Super Mario Bros. Super Show. It was loosely based on the original game and centers on Link, Zelda, Ganon and a fairy named Spryte, and also features Zelda's father, King Harkinian. Thirteen episodes were produced before the cancellation of The Super Mario Bros. Super Show. Although Zelda is sometimes captured by Ganon, she is depicted as a smart, resourceful character. The series also emphasises a romantic relationship between Link and Zelda, in which Link is always begging Zelda for a kiss. Zelda was voiced by Cyndy Preston in the TV series. Writer Phil Harnage thought that Zelda's characterisation was ahead of its time and a role model for girls. He said that rather than being a Disney Princess, Zelda was an "action hero in her own right". Preston said that she portrayed Zelda as an independent woman: "She didn't need a hero to save her, and that was so cool". Zelda and Link also appear in season 2 of Captain N: The Game Master.

=== Comics and manga ===
Shortly after the release of the first game, a companion manga book was published by Wanpaku Comics in September 1986. "The Hyrule Fantasy" manga was released in Japan and follows the same plot as the game with an expanded role for Zelda. In 1986, a Choose Your Own Adventure style of manga was published, The Legend of Zelda: The Mirage Castle. Published entirely in Japanese, the manga features playing as Zelda and some scrapped concepts, including Zelda's father named King Graham II. Zelda also appears in a similar manga book published in 1992, The Legend of Zelda: The Triforce of the Gods, which is based on A Link to the Past. A comic series published in the early 1990s by Valiant Comics was based on the adventures of Zelda and Link. Like The Legend of Zelda animated television series, which was being aired around the same time, it involves Link attempting to get a kiss from Zelda. A serial comic by manga author Shotaro Ishinomori was originally published in 1992 in Nintendo Power magazine and later collected in graphic novel form. It was based on The Legend of Zelda: A Link to the Past and tells an alternate version of the events. It was reprinted as a single volume in 2015 by Viz Media. Other manga adaptations of The Legend of Zelda games have also been published, including Majora's Mask, Ocarina of Time, The Minish Cap and Phantom Hourglass, which are illustrated by Akira Himekawa.

=== Gamebooks ===
Alongside Link, Zelda appears in several Nintendo gamebooks. The Crystal Trap and The Shadow Prince were published in 1992, which were written in the style of Choose Your Own Adventure books. The Crystal Trap focuses on Zelda freeing Link from the trap, while The Shadow Prince involves Link saving Zelda.

== Merchandise ==
Zelda has been reproduced in the form of figurines and plush toys. Various amiibo have been released since 2014 depicting her in several incarnations. Two amiibo of Zelda and Sheik were released for the Super Smash Bros. series in 2014 and 2015. Several amiibo of Zelda have been released for the Zelda series, including the Wind Waker incarnation, the Breath of the Wild incarnation and Zelda and loftwing from Skyward Sword. In November 2023, an amiibo for Tears of the Kingdom depicting Zelda holding the Master Sword was released. A Lego minifigure of Zelda is included as part of a Great Deku Tree Lego set. A second Zelda minifigure was included in a Lego set based on the final battle in Ocarina of Time.

== Reception and legacy ==
Critics and gamers consider Zelda to be a significant video game character in popular culture. The book Female Action Heroes described Zelda as "perhaps one of the most well-known princesses in video game history", though acknowledged that her role in the games was to serve as a damsel in distress. In 2009, she was voted the third greatest female character in games on Nintendo systems by the Official Nintendo Magazine, which appreciated her as "a strong woman who, with her sword and bow and arrow, is capable of holding her own in a fight". In 2016, Digital Spy ranked her as one of the "most iconic female game characters of all time". In 2018, readers of Guinness World Records Gamer's Edition voted her as one of the top video game characters of all time. Readers of the Japanese publication Famitsu chose her as their favourite Tears of the Kingdom character in 2023. Alex Huebner of iMore said that she is a "badass", illustrated by her various alter egos as a fighter in disguise, a pirate leader and a goddess. Ozzie Mejia, writing for Shacknews, chose Zelda as one of the best characters in Super Smash Bros. Ultimate, emphasising her increased speed and dash attack with additional knockback. He also praised her character development within the Zelda series for developing from a passive princess to a strong heroine. Eric Ravenscraft of Wired commented that despite not being the playable character in the mainline series, Zelda is often the driving force behind the story as the embodiment of wisdom and light, and opined that Link is "simply the sword Zelda wields".

Zelda's character development in Ocarina of Time was praised by Richard George and Audrey Drake of IGN, who commented that it was the first time in the series that she was given more depth. They particularly enjoyed seeing her develop from a carefree child to the warrior Sheik as a result of the game's time shifts. Maddy Myers writing for The Mary Sue considered Zelda and Sheik to be two halves of a flawed, complex character, but felt that the game "doesn't seem to respect her much". The Wind Waker was a highlight for Chad Concelmo of Destructoid, who commented on its rare gaming moment of creating a plot reveal in which the pirate Tetra is revealed to be Zelda, which was considered particularly rewarding due to the notoriously repetitive nature of the Zelda series. Tetra was recognised by The Guardian as one of 30 "interesting female game characters", with the comment, "Tetra demands respect and gets it". When reviewing Spirit Tracks, Abbie Stone of GamesRadar praised Zelda's role as a ghost that can possess enemies, as it places her in the position of co-lead throughout the game, and opined that this proves "action and femininity aren't mutually exclusive". Oli Welsh of Eurogamer commented that for most of the game she fulfils a similar role to Navi or Midna by providing hints and comments, but praised the close romance between her and Link that replaces her usual position as a distant ideal. Tom Mc Shea writing for GameSpot focused on the "endearing rapport" between Zelda and Link in the story of Skyward Sword, noting that rather than being a damsel in distress, Zelda is presented as Link's equal and that both characters must make a sacrifice. Jonathan Holmes writing for Destructoid highlighted a particular scene in Skyward Sword in which Zelda communicates her love for Link through her eyes and body language, describing it as "beautiful" and opined that Nintendo had made it an unforgettable moment.

Zelda's updated design, character development and prominent story arc in The Legend of Zelda: Breath of the Wild received widespread praise from critics.

Speaking for Nintendo Life, Alex Olney appreciated the human traits and flaws displayed by Zelda in Breath of the Wild and considered this to be her best incarnation, citing the pressure of her responsibilities, her determination to protect her kingdom and Link, her strength and power, and her ability to match Calamity Ganon and restrain him for 100 years. Gita Jackson writing for Kotaku considered her blue adventuring outfit to be a "cool departure from the norm" of the traditionally pink Hylian princess and illustrated her prominent story arc within the game. Madeline Carpou of The Mary Sue listed her Breath of the Wild incarnation as one of the most inspiring female characters in video games, stating that although she is "a living representation of the people's salvation" and struggles under the pressure of expectation, she refuses to give up on her responsibilities. Laura Dale of Syfy expressed delight at having the ability to play as Zelda throughout the entirety of Cadence of Hyrule, despite not being an official Zelda title. She said that exploring dungeons and fighting enemies as Zelda felt "absolutely awesome" and was made more enjoyable for a female gamer due to having something in common with the hero. Patricia Hernandez writing for Polygon said that Hyrule Warriors: Age of Calamity had transformed Zelda into a "total badass" and a capable fighter, which was particularly welcome after seeing her lamenting her inability to contribute more to the fight against Calamity Ganon in Breath of the Wild.

Steve Watts of GameSpot felt that the story in Tears of the Kingdom belongs to Zelda, not only because she is the focus of the main quest line, but also because the mystery of discovering her location slowly unravels throughout the game and leads to an "incredible, stirring revelation". He also praised the game for inverting the story trope of Link being the prophesied hero and making Zelda the strategist who makes him the hero by helping him in the distant past, thereby being the author of the prophecy. Zelda's story in Tears of the Kingdom was particularly praised by Matthew Byrd of Den of Geek, who described it as an "emotional and engaging arc", highlighting her sacrifice for those she loves and her memorable reveal as the Light Dragon. He praised her altruism for being dependable and aspirational, saying that it "doesn't feel like some cheap emotional ploy designed to drum up sympathy". Zelda's performance as a "solution-based thinker" in Echoes of Wisdom was well received by Todd Martens of the Los Angeles Times, who felt that the game benefited by having better character development and more inventiveness in Zelda than has previously been shown in Link.

=== Analysis ===
In Destructoid, Timothy Monbleau wrote that while Zelda was mostly a plot device and a player goal in the first three Zelda games, Yoshiaki Koizumi's involvement in writing Link's Awakening caused a fundamental shift in the series by producing stronger storylines. He opined that by giving the female character Marin a more intimate relationship with Link, Koizumi effectively impacted Zelda's role in subsequent games by giving her a more active role in the narrative. Brendan Main for The Escapist magazine commented that Zelda's alter-ego Sheik in Ocarina of Time broke the conventions of the character's role because "Sheik is everything Zelda is not". He commented that while Zelda's elegance and femininity had restricted her to being a captive, Sheik's ambiguous gender gave the character freedom, but noted that once Zelda is revealed to be Sheik, she is immediately returned to a captive again. Zelda's evolution from the "princess in peril" was noted by Kyle Hilliard of Game Informer who commented that in most games she is simply a goal for the player to acquire, but in more recent titles she has grown into a more fleshed-out character. Jason Guisao of Game Informer said that although Zelda has the potential to be equal to Link, "Nintendo is attached to tired scenarios where she is captured or immobilized". He opined that she had been sidelined in Breath of the Wild and should instead be leading a new era of fully integrated co-operative play. Jacob Kastrenakes for The Verge opined that switching Link's and Zelda's roles could be possible without requiring Link to be absent, but highlighted that Aonuma confirmed that this idea had been rejected. Sara Gitkos of iMore opined that Zelda deserved her own game due to being "a scholar, a leader, and a fierce princess who takes charge of her own destiny". Jay Castello writing for Polygon described the ending of Tears of the Kingdom as a tragedy for perpetuating the status quo of Zelda's repetitive role in the series, commenting that the gendered elements "appear to skate by simply because this has been going on so long that mentioning them feels blasé". Heather Wald of GamesRadar+ highlighted that Tears of the Kingdom had reignited the longstanding debate about the possibility of Zelda becoming a playable character in the series. NME writer Ali Shutler said it was a "bold move forward" by finally making Zelda a playable character in Echoes of Wisdom and praised her capabilities of exploring dungeons and fighting bosses. Liv Ngan of GamesRadar+ described the game as "bittersweet disappointment" after finding that Zelda had to step aside to make way for Link in the final battle. Ashley Bardhan of Rolling Stone commented that Nintendo was finally recognising the female characters in its franchises and that the game redefines the role of the Nintendo princess by giving Zelda the ability to save herself.

== See also ==
- Characters of The Legend of Zelda
