= Z2 (company) =

Video game developer

- Formerly: Z2Live Inc.
- Type: Subsidiary
- Industry: Video games
- Founded: 2009; 17 years ago
- Defunct: 2019
- Headquarters: Seattle, Washington, U.S.
- Parent: King (2016–2019)

Z2 (formerly Z2Live Inc.) was an American video game developer based in Seattle that focused on the creation of mobile games. In 2015, the company was acquired by King, which is a subsidiary of Activision Blizzard. It was shuttered in early 2019 with the closing of King's Seattle mobile game studio.

== History ==
Z2Live was founded in 2009 by David Bluhm and Damon Danieli with the goal of creating an Xbox Live style gaming platform. With the announcement of Apple's Game Center, Lou Fasulo, SVP, pivoted the company to its current business of creating highly social freemium games for mobile. The company's first game was Trade Nations, a city building simulation, which achieved critical acclaim as well as viral success within its first few months on the iOS platform. Following the initial success of Trade Nations, the company received additional investment from Seattle's Madrona Venture Group as well as Draper Fisher Jurvetson. The company's next game, MetalStorm, brought the freemium model to aerial combat flight simulators while also earning acclaim for its integration of AirPlay mirroring. Following MetalStorm, the company released its third iOS title Battle Nations which combined city building mechanics with strategy-based PvP. The company also expanded in 2012 with the acquisition of Big Sandwich Games, a Vancouver-based game developer company. 2015 saw the launch of their most successful game, Paradise Bay, and was the last one in existence upon their closure in 2019.

On February 12, 2015, Z2Live was acquired by King. On February 12, 2019, the company was shut down following mass layoffs by Activision Blizzard.

== Games ==
Name	Platform(s)	Year released
Trade Nations	iOS / OS X	2010
MetalStorm	iOS	2011
Battle Nations	iOS / OS X / Android	2011
Nitro	iOS	2011
MetalStorm: Aces	iOS	2013
ShadowSlayer	iOS	2013
Paradise Bay	iOS / Android / Windows / Fire OS	2015
