= Trade Nations =

2010 video game

- Developer(s): Z2Live
- Platform(s): iOS
- Release: November 15, 2010
- Genre(s): Simulation
- Mode(s): Single-player with multiplayer interaction

Trade Nations was a trading simulation social network game developed and published by Z2Live. It is no longer available for download. On September 28, 2016, the servers for the game were deleted, rendering it unplayable.

== Development ==
Trade Nations was Z2Live's first game. It was developed to have integration with JuJuPlay, Z2Live's own iOS based social gaming network, which helped facilitate Trade Nation's growth and retention. Apple later released its own Game Center which replaced JuJuPlay. Through the immediate success of Trade Nations, Z2Live achieved profitability which allowed it to continue to expand and grow.

== Gameplay ==
Trade Nations allowed players to become the mayor of their own village and grow it into a sprawling city. The gameplay centered around collecting raw materials, refining them into precious resources, and creating goods to amass a fortune. Exchanging resources among friends was also highly encouraged and a critical component of the game.

== Resources ==
Throughout the game, the player will collect different types of resources, some worth more than others in the market.

Another resource, it can be harvested regularly once the frontier is unlocked, is gold. Magic Beans are the resource that the player must pay to get. Z2live points can help buy special buildings and are acquired by completing achievements in all z2live games.
