= Link: The Faces of Evil and Zelda: The Wand of Gamelon =

1993 video games

Link: The Faces of Evil Zelda: The Wand of Gamelon
- Packaging for Link: The Faces of Evil and Zelda: The Wand of Gamelon. The artwork for Link and Zelda were reused promotional art from The Legend of Zelda: A Link to the Past.
- Developer: Animation Magic
- Publisher: Philips Interactive Media
- Director: Dale DeSharone
- Producer: Dale DeSharone
- Designers: Dale DeSharone; Rob Dunlavey
- Programmers: Linde Dynneson; John O'Brien; John Wheeler
- Artists: Tom Curry; Max Stienmetz; John Ursino
- Writer: Jonathan Merritt
- Composers: Tony Trippi; William Havlicek
- Series: The Legend of Zelda
- Platform: Philips CD-i
- Release: NA: October 10, 1993; EU: December 25, 1993
- Genre: Action-adventure
- Mode: Single-player

Link: The Faces of Evil and Zelda: The Wand of Gamelon are action-adventure games developed by Animation Magic and published by Philips Interactive Media for the CD-i on October 10, 1993, in North America and December 25 of the same year in Europe. They were released on the same day, were developed simultaneously, and look and play similarly because they use the same graphic engine. Both games are based on Nintendo's The Legend of Zelda franchise, but are not acknowledged as official, canonical entries and are the first two games of three Zelda games released for the CD-i. The third, Zelda's Adventure, was developed separately and plays differently.

Link: The Faces of Evil puts the player in control of Link, who goes on a quest to defeat Ganon and rescue Princess Zelda. Zelda: The Wand of Gamelon changes the roles and has the player control Zelda, who sets out to save Link and King Harkinian and defend her kingdom from Ganon. Both travel to a new world (Koridai and Gamelon, respectively) to thwart Ganon's plans. At the time of their release, the games received mixed reviews. In later years, both games have received universally negative reception for their plots, full-motion video animated cutscenes, voice acting, controls, and graphics. The games were not acknowledged in the official The Legend of Zelda: Hyrule Historia guidebook; Eiji Aonuma, who has served as a series director since Ocarina of Time, has remarked that the games do not "fit in the 'Zelda' franchise". This has led to the three games (Link: The Faces of Evil, Zelda: The Wand of Gamelon, and Zelda's Adventure) being considered not only the worst games in the Zelda franchise but also among the worst video games of all time.

== Gameplay ==
Players take control of Link in The Faces of Evil, and of Zelda in The Wand of Gamelon. At the beginning of both games, players have access to only three areas, which are accessed through an in-game map. The two characters only have their swords and shields at this stage. The sword can be used to attack enemies either by stabbing or shooting "Power Blasts", while the shield can deflect attacks. Link's sword in The Faces of Evil is known as his Smart Sword, and will not hurt anyone considered friendly. The shield is used whenever the player character is standing still or crouching. They gain new items later on in the game, including lamp oil, rope, and bombs, all of which can be purchased from a shop. Rubies (rupees in canon Zelda games) can be obtained by stabbing them with the sword after defeating an enemy, after which they can be spent at the shop.

The player's health is measured in "Life Hearts". Although the player begins the game with only three hearts, there are ways to earn more. Each time the player character is injured, they will lose at least one-half of a heart. The first two times the player runs out of Life Hearts, the player will be given the option of continuing from near the point where their last heart was lost. When the player loses their hearts for the third time, they will be returned to the map and must start the level from the beginning. Returning to the map replenishes their Life Hearts and lives, and they will retain any items and Rubies they picked up.

== Plot ==
=== Link: The Faces of Evil ===
In Hyrule Castle, a bored Link discusses his desire for a new adventure with King Harkinian. His hopes are immediately fulfilled when a wizard named Gwonam arrives on a magic carpet to announce that Ganon and his minions have invaded and conquered the island nation of Koridai. Gwonam recruits Link to stop Ganon after he shows a written prophecy that states "Only Link can defeat Ganon". Link is then transported to Koridai by Gwonam, who explains that many of Ganon's minions have established the "Faces of Evil", giant mountains and stone structures that bear the resemblance of their commanding minions that act as their bases of operation. Shortly after arriving, Gwonam discovers and informs Link that Ganon has captured Princess Zelda and imprisoned her in his lair.

Link ventures through Koridai and conquers all the faces along with defeating their leaders such as the necromancer Goronu; the anthropomorphic jokester pig Harlequin; the fire-breathing armored knight Militron; the gluttonous cyclops Glutko; and the three-eyed anthropomorphic wolf Lupay. At one point during Link's quest, he discovers the sacred Book of Koridai, which he brings to a translator named Aypo, who reveals to him that the book is the only way to defeat Ganon. Link finally confronts Ganon, who offers him the promise of great power with an alliance and the threat of murder. After imprisoning Ganon within the pages of the Book of Koridai, Link rescues a sleeping Zelda and awakens her. Gwonam appears and congratulates Link and while transporting the two back to Hyrule Castle, shows them the liberated and recovering Koridai before he officially declares Link the hero of the island.

=== Zelda: The Wand of Gamelon ===
King Harkinian announces his plan to travel to the Duchy of Gamelon and aid its ruler Duke Onkled, who is supposedly under attack by Ganon's forces, and orders his daughter Princess Zelda to send Link for backup if she does not hear from him within a month. He reassures her that he will be protected by the Triforce of Courage while Zelda's elderly nursemaid, Impa, reassures Zelda that the Triforce of Wisdom promises that Harkinian will return safely. Despite these promises, a month eventually passes without word from Harkinian, so as instructed, Zelda sends Link to find him. When he too fails to return, Zelda ventures off to Gamelon to find both Link and Harkinian, accompanied by Impa.

As she ventures across Gamelon, Zelda battles many of Ganon's minions including the mummy Gibdo; the three wicked witches of the Fairy Pool; and the knight Iron Knuckle. During Zelda's quest, Impa discovers that King Harkinian was captured by Ganon and that Link was engaged in a battle, the outcome of which is unclear. Eventually, Zelda rescues a woman named Lady Alma from evil sorcerer Wizrobe and learns that Alma had met Link before, providing her with his canteen. Zelda then travels to Dodomai Palace, where it is revealed that Duke Onkled has betrayed King Harkinian and is collaborating with Ganon. Zelda storms the palace, kills Ganon's henchman, Hektan, and saves a prisoner named Lord Kiro, who had accompanied Harkinian on his trip to Gamelon before he was captured. Kiro then reveals to Zelda the entrance to Onkled's chamber and when they confront him, he reveals the secret entrance to Reesong Palace, where Ganon has taken residence.

Zelda travels to the Shrine of Gamelon to battle shapeshifter Omfak and obtain the Wand needed to defeat Ganon, then makes her way to Reesong Palace, where she casts a spell to bind Ganon with chains, before she rescues her father. Back at Hyrule Castle, Lord Kiro turns Duke Onkled over to King Harkinian, who orders him to scrub all the floors in Hyrule as punishment. Although Link's whereabouts are still unknown, a comment by Lady Alma, who is also present at Harkinian's return, prompts Zelda to throw her mirror against the wall; as it smashes, Link magically materializes, seemingly having been trapped in the mirror. The group then has a feast to celebrate Gamelon's return to peace.

== Development ==
In 1989, Nintendo signed a deal with Sony to begin development of a CD-ROM-based add-on for the Super NES (see Super NES CD-ROM) that would allow for FMV and larger games. However, Nintendo broke the agreement and instead signed with Philips to make the add-on, which caused Sony to spin off their add-on into its own console called the PlayStation. Witnessing the poor reception of the Sega Mega-CD, Nintendo scrapped the idea of making an add-on entirely. As part of dissolving the agreement with Philips, Nintendo gave them the license to use five of their characters, including Link, Princess Zelda, Ganon, and Mario for games on Philips's console, the CD-i, after the partnership's dissolution.

Contracting out to independent studios, Philips subsequently used the characters to create three games for the CD-i, with Nintendo taking no part in their development except to give input on the look of the characters based on the artwork from Nintendo's original two games and that of their respective instruction booklets. Philips insisted that the development studios utilize all aspects of the CD-i's capabilities, including FMV, high-resolution graphics, and CD-quality music. Because the system had not been designed as a dedicated video game console, there were several technical limitations, such as unresponsive controls (especially for the standard infrared controller), and numerous problems in streaming audio, memory, disc access, and graphics. The first two games were showcased at the 1993 Consumer Electronics Show.

The Faces of Evil and The Wand of Gamelon were the first two Nintendo-licensed games released on the Philips CD-i. They were given the relatively low budget of approximately $600,000, and the development deadline was set at a little over a year – to be split between the two games. It was decided by Animation Magic, the Cambridge, Massachusetts-based development team led by Dale DeSharone, that the two games would be developed in tandem and would share the same graphics engine in order to make more efficient use of the budget.

The rest of the development team included three programmers (all previous employees of Spinnaker Software), musician Tony Trippi, and freelance writer Jonathan Merritt, who created the scripts and designs. Under DeSharone's direction, development progressed similarly to that of his game Below the Root, which Retro Gamer's John Szczepaniak suggested was as a forerunner. Background designs were created by local Cambridge artists. The animated cutscenes were created by a team of animators from Russia, led by Igor Razboff, who were flown to the United States for the project. The animators reportedly spend six months animating the cutscenes for both games while living in apartments in downtown Boston, Massachusetts. These games marked the first time that Russian outsourcing had been utilized by an American games company – a move that was only possible due to the somewhat thawed political climate after the fall of the Berlin Wall.

For voice acting, Animation Magic recruited and auditioned local New England community theater actors in Boston, Massachusetts. Jeffrey Rath was cast as Link. In a 2010 interview with The Gaming Liberty, Rath stated that there were two-hour recording sessions after roughly 15 minutes of rehearsals. Bonnie Jean Wilbur was cast as Zelda and her husband Paul Wann played various characters, including Gwonam, Aypo, Mayor Cravendish and Harbanno. Mark Berry provided the voices of King Harkinian, Ganon and a Gibdo. Additional voices were provided by Jeffrey Nelson (who is speculated to have voiced Morshu), Natalie Brown, Phil Miller, Chris Flockton, John Mahon, Josie McElroy, Jerry Goodwin, Karen Grace, and Marguerite Scott. Brown, Flockton and Goodwin had previously worked with DeSharone on two Spinnaker Software games the previous year, Alice in Wonderland and Laser Lords.

== Reception ==
=== Contemporary responses ===
At the time of its release, contemporary criticism was mixed for both games. SNES Force magazine described the animated sequences as "breathtaking" and praised the game for its high-resolution graphics and its "brilliant" use of sound and speech. Highly anticipated by the French video game press, Joystick magazine's development preview of The Faces of Evil described it as a veritable arcade-quality game with stunning graphics and "perfect animation". The magazine gave The Wand of Gamelon similar praise, and gave it additional praise for its use of voice acting, its plot and its backgrounds. The same magazine would ultimately give The Faces of Evil a 79% a few months later, giving particularly high marks for music, sound effects and playthrough time. Power Unlimited gave The Wand of Gamelon a 90%, calling it "a beautifully designed and very good sounding platform game, which is unfortunately completely unplayable. The controls are the biggest disadvantage, but the game is also far too difficult. The animations in between are very nice." The magazine also reviewed The Faces of Evil and gave it a 90%, saying: "Nintendo almost never gives others the right to use their characters in games, and the one time they did, they probably shouldn't have done it. Animation Magic made a game with it that was beautiful for the eyes and ears, but was unplayable."

Other publications gave more critical reviews. CDi Magazine rated The Faces of Evil 65%, stating that the game was a poor relation to the original Nintendo games and singling out the perfunctory storyline, the lack of graphical features like parallax, and the slow and repetitive gameplay. Another reviewer for the magazine gave The Wand of Gamelon a higher 75% and called it a "reasonably good game" for its puzzles and animated sequences, but criticized its plot and controls. In 1994, Edge reported that as CD-i sales began to suffer, criticism sharpened, and the games were described as low-cost, low-risk ventures that had failed to excite any interest in the platform.

=== Re-evaluation and infamy ===
Link: The Faces of Evil and Zelda: The Wand of Gamelon have been met with negative reviews in retrospect. Wired magazine said that the animation in both games was extremely simple and stilted and that the graphics had several glitches. IGN's Travis Fahs criticized the games for using a style similar to Zelda II: The Adventure of Link, for "insufferable" controls, and for the designers' poor understanding of the Legend of Zelda franchise. He noted, however, that the backgrounds looked decent considering the poor design of the CD-i's hardware. IGN's Peer Schneider criticized The Wand of Gamelon for not effectively indicating when a platform begins or ends, and also said its controls were "sloppy". Schneider also argued that the decision to star Zelda in The Wand of Gamelon may have been based on the fact that the CD-i's library was directed at women. However, he felt that they failed at this due to Zelda playing the same role as Link.

Pictured is the intro of Link: The Faces of Evil. The quality of the games' cutscenes has been derided by critics.

The games' animated cutscenes and voice acting drew particular criticism. The Star Tribune described the voice acting as "laughable", and was also criticized by Zelda Elements as "jarring". IGN described the cutscenes as "infamous" and "cheesy"; other reviewers described them as "freakish" and "an absolute joke". Schneider felt that the cutscenes in The Wand of Gamelon were "entertaining... for all the wrong reasons".

The games' soundtracks drew mixed responses. Zelda Elements felt it was "average" and not up to the usual Zelda quality, while Schneider described the soundtrack as "redbook audio CD pop". This has been contested by other reviewers, who described it as diverse, high-quality and superb with an adventurous upbeat tempo blending "delicious '80s synth", electric guitar, panpipes, marimbas, and other unusual instruments.

Despite the largely negative reception that the games have received, there have been a few positive reviews as well. Both Danny Cowan of 1UP.com and John Szczepaniak of Hardcore Gaming 101 praised Faces of Evil and Wand of Gamelon as among the best games on the CD-i. Szczepaniak in particular suggested that several of the magazines that had rated and reviewed Wand of Gamelon and Faces of Evil had engaged in hate campaigns having never even played the game. Their praises drew from the games' detailed, well-drawn in-game backgrounds (which was described as both Gigeresque and Monet-esque) and "pretty decent" gameplay, although both criticized the controls. According to Szczepaniak, the games' controls work best when played with a hardwired three-button CD-i control pad, as opposed to CD-i's "crappy infra-red remote".

In a periodical for Retro Gamer magazine, Szczepaniak suggested that the comparison made by reviewers between the quality of the CD-i duology and the rest of the Zelda series was unfair, arguing that when reviewed in their own right, the games were actually excellent. Contrary to what were described as "lies perpetuated about [Faces of Evil and Wand of Gamelon]", Retro Gamer described the games as "astoundingly good" and rated them together as number ten in its "Perfect Ten Games" for CD-i. While acknowledging that they were non-canonical, the games were praised for exhilarating pacing and superb gameplay design.

=== In popular culture ===
Morshu has gained notoriety as an Internet meme.

Various characters from the game such as shopkeeper Morshu, the wizard Gwonam and King Harkinian have gained notoriety as Internet memes, having been featured in fan-made 3D animations and YouTube Poop videos. (Note: Attributed to multiple references:)

=== Sales ===
In 1994, Edge reported that both Faces of Evil and Wand of Gamelon had sold a "respectable number of units", but IGN claimed that sales of CD-i games (including Faces of Evil and Wand of Gamelon) were poor and caused them to be readily available years later.

=== Rankings ===
IGN's Peer Schneider ranked the two games among Nintendo's biggest failures (despite the games not being made by Nintendo). Electronic Gaming Monthly contributor Seanbaby ranked Zelda: Wand of Gamelon the sixth worst game of all time, while GameTrailers rated it the fifth worst game of all time.

The Wand of Gamelon appeared in an IGN bracket poll of "The Greatest Legend of Zelda Game" along with Zelda's Adventure. It lost in the first set of rounds to The Legend of Zelda: A Link to the Past.

=== Legacy ===
Unofficial remakes of both games were developed in GameMaker by amateur developer Seth "Dopply" Fulkerson in an effort to teach himself game development. After four years of development, the remakes were released in November 2020 for Linux and Microsoft Windows. The remakes feature the same assets and gameplay as the original releases and add several quality-of-life improvements. In addition to subtitles for cutscenes and a widescreen mode, the remakes add new unlockable content and the ability to choose between the original gameplay style and "Remastered Mode", which makes various gameplay changes to reduce player frustration. To avoid receiving a cease-and-desist notice from Nintendo like many similar fan projects, Fulkerson made the remakes unavailable for download two days after their release.

By 2023, Fulkerson was developing a spiritual successor to the games, titled Arzette: The Jewel of Faramore. Arzette features similar gameplay and graphics to Faces of Evil and Wand of Gamelon, as well as vocal performances by Link and Zelda actors Jeffrey Rath and Bonnie Jean Wilbur. The game was published by Limited Run Games on February 14, 2024, for the Nintendo Switch, PlayStation 4, PlayStation 5, Xbox Series X/S, and Windows.

== See also ==
- Zelda's Adventure (the third Zelda game released for the CD-i)
