= Zelda II: The Adventure of Link =

1987 video game

- North American NES box art. On physical copies, the shield insignia at the top-left is a cutout that shows the gold cartridge inside.
- Developer: Nintendo R&D4
- Publisher: Nintendo
- Directors: Tadashi Sugiyama; Yasuhisa Yamamura
- Producer: Shigeru Miyamoto
- Programmers: Kazuaki Morita; Tatsuo Nishiyama; Shigehiro Kasamatsu; Yasunari Nishida; Toshihiko Nakago
- Artist: Kazunobu Shimizu
- Writer: Takashi Tezuka
- Composer: Akito Nakatsuka
- Series: The Legend of Zelda
- Platforms: Famicom Disk System, Nintendo Entertainment System, GameCube, Game Boy Advance
- Release: January 14, 1987: Famicom Disk System; JP: January 14, 1987 NES; PAL: September 26, 1988; NA: December 1, 1988 GameCube; PAL: November 14, 2003; NA: November 17, 2003; JP: April 1, 2004 Game Boy Advance; JP: August 10, 2004; NA: October 25, 2004; PAL: January 7, 2005
- Genres: Action role-playing, platform
- Mode: Single-player

Zelda II: The Adventure of Link (Note: The full Japanese title varies between sources: the in-game title screen and product packaging supplement the main Japanese title Link no Bōken (Japanese: リンクの冒険, Hepburn: Rinku no Bōken) by displaying the English subtitle The Legend of Zelda 2 above it, which is otherwise omitted when the title is spelled in plain text such as on the spine of the game's disk card and manual; a TV ad for the game pronounces the title as Zelda no Densetsu – Part 2: Link no Bōken (ゼルダの伝説パート2 リンクの冒険, Zeruda no Densetsu Pāto Tsū: Rinku no Bōken).) is a 1987 action role-playing game developed and published by Nintendo. It is the second installment in the Legend of Zelda series, and was released in Japan for the Famicom Disk System on January 14, 1987, less than a year after the Japanese release and seven months before the North American release of the original The Legend of Zelda. Zelda II was released in North America and the PAL region for the Nintendo Entertainment System in late 1988, almost two years after its initial release in Japan.

The Adventure of Link is a direct sequel to the original The Legend of Zelda, again involving the protagonist Link, on a quest to save Princess Zelda, who has fallen under a sleeping spell. The game's emphasis on side-scrolling platform and role-playing elements marked a significant departure from its top-down predecessor.

The game was a critical and commercial success, and introduced elements such as Link's "magic meter" and the Dark Link character that would become commonplace in future Zelda games; however, the role-playing elements, such as experience points and limited lives, have not been used since in canonical games. The Adventure of Link was followed by A Link to the Past for the Super Nintendo Entertainment System in 1991.

== Gameplay ==
Zelda II: The Adventure of Link is an action role-playing game that bears little resemblance to the first or later entries in the Legend of Zelda series. It features side-scrolling areas within a larger top-down world map, unlike the exclusively top-down perspective of the first game. The side-scrolling gameplay and experience system are similar to features of Konami's Castlevania series, especially Castlevania II: Simon's Quest. The game incorporates a strategic combat system, a proximity continue system based on lives, an experience points system, magic spells, and more interaction with non-player characters. Apart from the non-canonical CD-i The Legend of Zelda games, Link: The Faces of Evil and Zelda: The Wand of Gamelon, no game in the series includes a lives feature. The side-scrolling perspective is used in a minor capacity in Link's Awakening and the other Game Boy entries, while the top-down perspective still takes focus.

=== Experience levels ===
In this installment, Link gains experience points to upgrade his Attack, Magic, and Life attributes by defeating enemies. He can raise each of these attributes a maximum of seven levels above their starting point. A level increase for Attack, Magic, or Life will respectively increase the sword's offensive power, decrease the amount of magic needed to cast spells, and reduce the damage Link takes from enemy attacks.

In the Western version of the game, each attribute requires a different amount of experience to level up, with Life requiring the fewest points to level and Attack requiring the most. When enough points are acquired to raise an attribute, the player may choose to level up that attribute or to cancel and continue gaining experience points towards the next level in another attribute. In the original Japanese version, all attributes require the same number of experience points to level up, and the required number is lower; however, if the player loses all lives, the levels of all attributes will be reset to the lowest of the three (while level upgrades in the Western version are permanent). Once Link has raised an attribute to the maximum level of eight, further advances in that attribute will earn Link an extra life, without advancing the attribute itself. Link begins the game with four Heart Containers and four Magic Containers and can acquire up to four more of each, permanently increasing his life points and magic points respectively. Other games in The Legend of Zelda series only allow Link to increase his strength through new weapons, items, and Heart Containers. Certain enemies drain Link's experience when they attack, but he will never lose a level once raised. When a game ends or is saved, the cartridge records Link's current ability levels and the number of experience points required for the next increase but resets his accumulated points to zero.

=== Overworld map and side-scrolling ===
Overworld view of Death Mountain

The Adventure of Link has a dual-mode dynamic of top-down view and side-scrolling view. This duality of either traveling or entering combat is one of many aspects adapted from the role-playing genre. The overworld, the area where the majority of the action occurs in other Zelda games, has a top-down perspective, but it now serves as a navigational map to the other areas. While traversing Hyrule, figures randomly appear around the player: a small blob denoting easy enemies, a large biped denoting harder enemies, and a Fairy to refill Link's health. The game switches to side-scrolling mode when Link steps onto particular spots in the overworld map to enter towns, buildings, or caves, or when he encounters wandering monsters. This mode has most of the action and danger.

=== Combat system ===
The Adventure of Link has a more complex combat system than its predecessor. Armed with a sword and shield, Link must alternate between standing and crouching positions to attack enemies and defend himself; for example, the Iron Knuckle enemy changes the height of its attack and its shield depending on Link's current stance, forcing Link to change stances until he has a chance to attack safely. Link has the ability to jump, which can be used for attacking tall or airborne enemies and can be used for evasion. Eventually, he can learn techniques for midair downward and upward stabs.

=== Magic and special items ===
Though the Zelda series is based on Link collecting items in order to progress in the game, these special items grant abilities that either remain in permanent use for the rest of the game or can only be activated in the overworld. In place of actively used items, The Adventure of Link features eight magic spells for Link to use during action scenes. Each spell is learned from a different wise man in one of the eight towns within Hyrule. Link often must complete side-quests, such as retrieving lost items, before they will teach him their spells. Some spells and items are necessary for advancing in the game. The Life spell becomes the main means of recovering health during action scenes, because healing Fairies are rare.

=== Replay ===
Like its predecessor, The Adventure of Link allows storing up to three game sessions in the cartridge's memory. Once the game has been completed, selecting the corresponding file in the main menu allows starting a new game. This preserves the acquired experience levels, techniques, and magic spells. However, special items, Heart and Magic containers, or extra lives, are not retained; these must be obtained again.

== Plot ==
Zelda under an enchanted sleep

The Adventure of Link is the eighth and last game in the "Defeated Hero" timeline that connects to an alternate reality scenario where the Hero of Time is defeated by Ganondorf in Ocarina of Time.

Several years after the events of The Legend of Zelda, the now-16-year-old Link notices a strange mark on the back of his left hand, exactly like the crest of Hyrule. He seeks out Impa, who takes him to the North Castle, where a door has been magically sealed for generations. Impa places the back of Link's left hand on the door, and it opens, revealing a sleeping maiden. Impa tells Link that the maiden is Zelda, the princess of Hyrule from long ago. Zelda's brother tried to force her into telling their recently deceased father's secrets concerning the Triforce. Princess Zelda refused to reveal its location, and the prince's magician friend, in anger, tried to strike her down with a spell. Zelda fell under a powerful sleeping spell, but the magician was unable to control the wildly arcing magic and was killed by it. The prince, filled with remorse and unable to reverse the spell, had his sister placed in the castle tower, hoping she would one day be awakened. He decreed that princesses born to the royal family from that point on would be named Zelda, in remembrance of this tragedy.

Impa says that the mark on Link's hand means that he is the hero chosen to awaken Zelda. She gives Link a chest containing six crystals and ancient writings that only a great future king of Hyrule can read. Link finds that he can read the document, even though he has never seen the language before; it indicates that the crystals must be set into statues within six palaces scattered across Hyrule. This will open the way to the Great Palace, which contains the Triforce of Courage. Only the power of the combined Triforces can awaken Zelda. Taking the crystals, Link sets out to restore them to their palaces. Meanwhile, Ganon's followers seek to kill Link, as sprinkling his blood on Ganon's ashes will bring Ganon back to life.

Ultimately, Link restores the crystals to the six palaces and enters the Great Palace. After venturing deep inside, Link battles the last of the guardians, a flying creature known as Thunderbird. Afterwards, his true heart is tested by fighting his own shadow. Link then claims the Triforce of Courage and returns to Zelda. The three triangles unite into the Triforce, and Link's wish awakens Zelda.

== Development and release ==
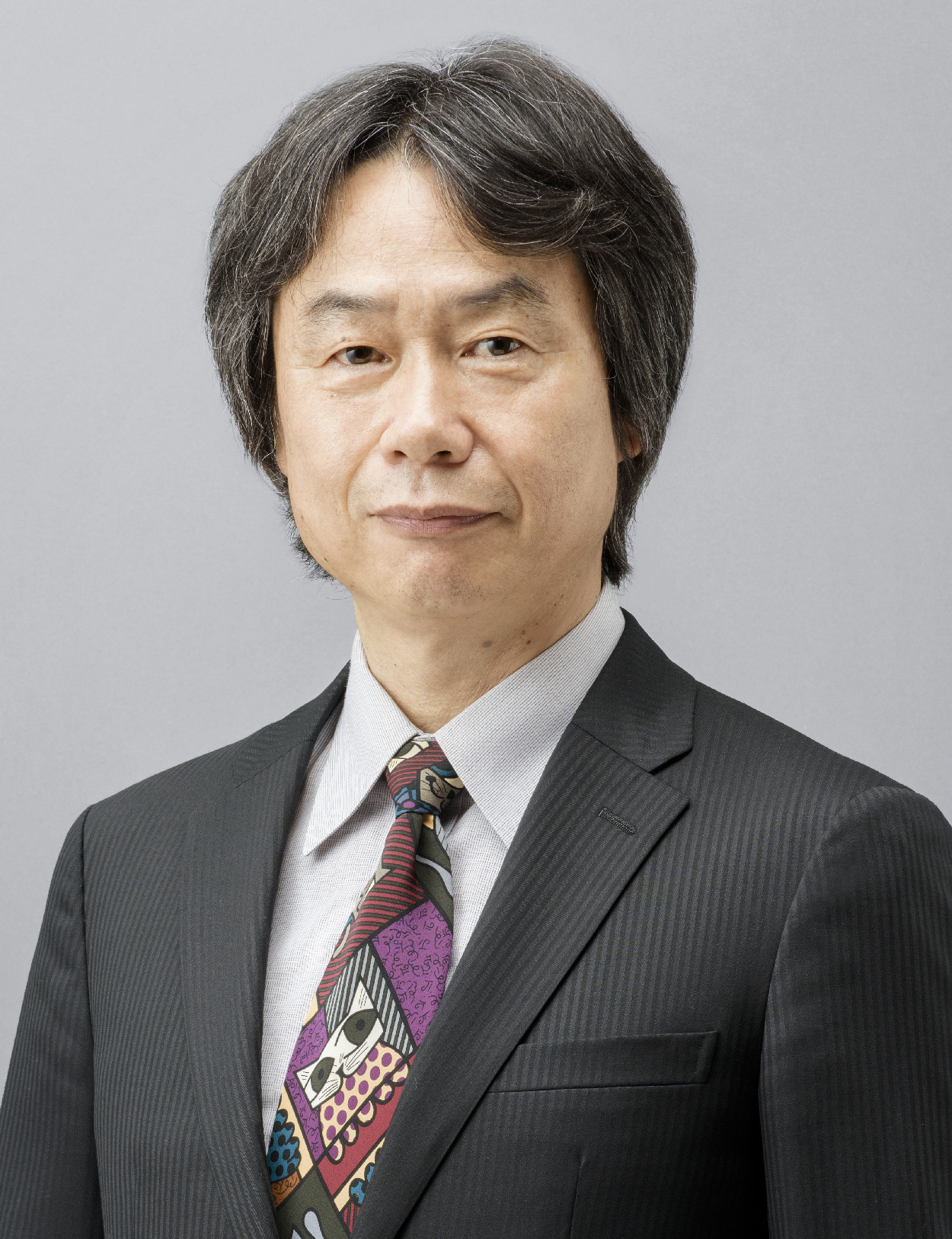
Shigeru Miyamoto is the co-creator of the first game and producer of the sequel.

Shigeru Miyamoto, co-creator of the original The Legend of Zelda, intended to make Zelda II: The Adventure of Link fundamentally different from its predecessor. A new team was assembled to develop the sequel, except for Miyamoto (who is credited with the pseudonym "Miyahon") as the producer and Takashi Tezuka as the story- and scriptwriter. Zelda II: The Adventure of Link had two directors: Tadashi Sugiyama and Yasuhisa Yamamura. Sugiyama is credited with the pseudonym "Sugiyan" as his first major project at Nintendo, and Yamamura is credited with his nickname "Yamahen". Music composer Akito Nakatsuka is credited as "Tsukasan". The game's combat system was influenced by Irem's arcade beat 'em up title Kung-Fu Master (1984), which Miyamoto's team ported to the NES in 1985, while the role-playing mechanics were influenced by Chunsoft's Dragon Quest (1986).

The Adventure of Link was originally released for the Japan-only Family Computer Disk System on January 14, 1987, followed by the Nintendo Entertainment System in PAL regions on September 26, 1988, and in North America on December 1, 1988. A shortage of ROM chips in 1988 prevented Nintendo from releasing games according to their original schedules; the delayed products included The Adventure of Link, while the company was preparing to release Super Mario Bros. 2 for the Western market and decided to delay Super Mario Bros. 3 to 1990 shortly after the former's release. Like the first Zelda game, the FDS version appears to be an earlier version of the game, with a few obvious differences. In the FDS version, the dungeons are all gray or green, whereas in the English NES release, each dungeon has a unique color. The two dungeon bosses Carrok and Volvagia (the latter being named Barba in the NES release) have different graphical appearances. The game over screen in the English version features the silhouette of Ganon from the chest up, with the text "Game Over/Return of Ganon", whereas the FDS game over screen is a plain black screen with the text "Return of Ganon/The End".

There are some slight additions and differences in the dungeons. Due to the Disk System's additional sound chip, the NES conversion lost some musical elements, especially from the title screen. On the main map, the icons denoting attacking monsters look different. The most significant change is the spending of experience points, as Link's three attributes cost the same, unlike the worldwide release. Leveling up is very different on the FDS version, as the saved game on the disk will only let the attributes levels go as high as whatever is set the lowest - for example, if Life is at 5, Strength is at 4, and Magic is at 1, then it will save all as level 1.

The Adventure of Link was re-released in 2003 on The Legend of Zelda: Collector's Edition disc for the GameCube, and again in 2004 as part of the Classic NES Series for Game Boy Advance, with minor changes. The intro text was changed to read "third Triforce" rather than "No.3 Triforce" and the copyright date was altered to read "1987–2004 Nintendo". The death animation removed flashing colors in an effort to prevent seizures, replacing it with a solid red color.

Zelda II was released as the 100th game on the Wii's Virtual Console in 2007: in Japan on January 23, in Europe and Australia on February 9 and in North America on June 4. The text changes are not present in this version, but it does feature the solid red color in the death animations from the GameCube and Game Boy Advance versions. It was re-released again on the Nintendo 3DS's Virtual Console in September 2011, alongside the first Zelda game, as part of the "3DS Ambassadors" program. It is one of ten NES games for owners who purchased 3DS consoles before the price drop. It was later made available for all 3DS owners in Japan on June 6, 2012, in Europe on September 13, and in North America on November 22. The game was also re-released on the Wii U's Virtual Console in September 2013. It is one of the 30 games in the NES Classic Edition, a miniature replica of the Nintendo Entertainment System, released on November 10, 2016, in Australia and Japan and one day later in North America and Europe. It is also featured in the Game & Watch: The Legend of Zelda handheld console released in November 12, 2021 along the first Zelda game and Link's Awakening.

== Reception ==
=== Contemporary reviews ===
Reception

Review scores
Publication	Score
Famicom Hisshoubon	FDS: 5/5, 4.5/5 (Note: The two reviewers in Famicom Hisshoubon scored the game on a 5 point scale)
Famicom Tsūshin	FDS: 8/10, 10/10, 9/10, 9/10

For the Famicom Disk System (FDS) version of Zelda II, Japanese publications Famicom Hisshoubon and Famicom Tsūshin gave it positive reviews. In Famicom Hisshoubon, one reviewer complimented it as the perfect combination of puzzle-solving and action and that it was twice as fun as the previous Zelda game. The second reviewer from the magazine also called it a big step forward in game design that will surely have an impact on future games. One reviewer was put off by the lack of availability of items and that losing all their experience points on dying was a bad design choice. They concluded it was a still a hard game to put down, but not as satisfying as the first game.

Upon its release in North America, Zelda II became one of the most popular Nintendo Entertainment System games of 1988, with many retailers reporting that the game was selling out that year. The game ultimately sold 4.38 million copies worldwide. For the English-language NES release, a reviewer in Computer Entertainer described it as a worthy successor to The Legend of Zelda and that while difficult it has a tremendous amount of play value for game that will occupy weeks of a players time. In Power Play, the two reviewers complimented the graphics and music while commenting on the difficulty, with one reviewer concluding it as "very difficult, but always fair."

Based on its culminative score, it was the second highest ranked game from Famicom Tsūshin of in 1987, only being beaten by Dragon Quest II. Nintendo Power awarded it the Game of the Year Award for 1988. In 1990, Nintendo Power's special edition Pak Source gave it ratings of 4/5 for Graphic and Sound, 3.5/5 for Play Control, 4.5/5 for Challenge, and 4/5 for Theme Fun.

=== Retrospective and re-releases ===
Reception

Aggregate scores
Aggregator	Score
GameRankings	78.14% (NES); 68.88% (GBA)
Metacritic	73 / 100 (GBA)

Review scores
Publication	Score
1Up.com	65 / 100 (GBA)
AllGame	4.5/5 (NES); 3.5/5 (GBA)
Dragon	3/5 (NES)
GameSpot	6.9 / 10 (GBA)
IGN	7 / 10 (GBA)
Nintendo Power	72 / 100 (GBA)
Play	91% (NES)

In 1992 Total! magazine awarded an 82% rating, due in great part to mediocre sub-scores for music and graphics. A 1993 review in Dragon by Sandy Petersen, gave 3 out of 5 stars. Nintendo Power said that the game was "an entertaining and natural step in the franchise's evolution", In Play magazine praised the unique gameplay, describing it as combination of unique elements that creates an action-RPG experience unlike any other. In 1997, Electronic Gaming Monthly listed Zelda II as number 72 on its "100 Best Games of All Time", saying that while the other three extant games in the series were better (The Legend of Zelda, A Link to the Past, and Link's Awakening all placed within the top 30), it was still a masterpiece, featuring outstanding gameplay and a much larger quest than its predecessor. Zelda II was rated the 110th best game made on a Nintendo system in Nintendo Power's Top 200 Games list. In August 2008, Nintendo Power listed it as the 12th best Nintendo Entertainment System video game, describing it as a radical and refreshing departure from its predecessor.

IGN said that the game is a "recommended and playable adventure" but also noted that players should not expect the same gameplay from the classic Zelda titles. 1UP.com praised the game's length, saying that the players can find plenty to keep them busy for some time. Kotaku enjoyed the darker spin on the original Zelda, stating that the more detailed graphics and bigger sprites made enemies appear more menacing and hostile; they also noted that an evolved combat system makes enemies able to defend themselves, withdraw, or strike strategically, using the environment to their advantage. The game also received some criticism. In a 2007 retrospective, GameSpot said that while the game is "decent enough to make it worth the $5 price [on the Wii's Virtual Console]", it features "questionable design decision[s]" and can get confusing if players don't have the help of walkthroughs. The GBA version of the game has an aggregated score of 73 on Metacritic.

== Legacy ==
The game introduced and expanded many enduring elements of the Zelda series. For example, a greater variety of non-player characters (NPCs) have more pivotal roles in Link's quests. The use of metered magic and spells has also carried over into other Zelda games. The Triforce of Courage is introduced in The Adventure of Link with an important role in later Zelda games, as it is strongly associated with Link. Dark Link is a version of Link's Shadow that appears in Ocarina of Time, a similar Link clone called Shadow Link appears in Four Swords Adventures, and yet another appears in Spirit Tracks, as well as in A Link Between Worlds.

The Adventure of Link is one of the first games to significantly combine role-playing video game and platforming elements. Over the next few years, a number of Japanese-made games appeared with a similar format; major games such as Cadash (1989) closely resemble The Adventure of Link, with side-scrolling platform stages supplemented by RPG-like statistical systems, weapons, armor, and magic spells.

Five of the sages in Ocarina of Time bear the same names as towns from The Adventure of Link (Rauru, Ruto, Saria, Nabooru, and Darunia; excluding Impa). The town of Mido shares the name of a character in Kokiri Forest. In the in-game chronology, the towns were named after the characters. The Adventure of Link is the only Zelda game of the main English releases not to use "The Legend of Zelda" in its title; the only Zelda game to feature cumulative lives and therefore the only game in the series to include 1-up dolls. The subsequent A Link to the Past for the Super Famicom in 1991 follows new Link and Zelda characters and returns to the top-down style of the original.

There are a small number of side-scrolling areas in Link's Awakening, mainly tunnels and caves. The series left the top-down style again in 1998 with Ocarina of Time for Nintendo 64, with 3D graphics. A new version of the composition "Temple", arranged by Shogo Sakai, is featured in Super Smash Bros. Melee, where it is played during the "Hyrule Temple" stage and the "Underground Maze" level. A variation of the track, as well as a new version of the "Great Palace" level song, also appears in Super Smash Bros. Brawl. The track was later once again updated and appeared twice, as the "StreetPass Battle Theme" as well as a slower version for the "Battle Victory" music, in the Nintendo 3DS game A Link Between Worlds. The StreetPass battle mode is itself inspired by the final boss fight of Zelda II; StreetPass fights occur between one player as Link and the other player as Shadow/Dark Link. The Famicom Disk System version of the composition "Battle Theme" was reused as the "Miniboss Theme" in The Minish Cap.

Zelda II was highly influential to other NES games like Faxanadu, Moon Crystal, and The Battle of Olympus. Some recent games that take more direct inspiration from Zelda II include Adventure Time: Hey Ice King! Why'd You Steal Our Garbage?!! (which is intended to play like, and pay homage to, Zelda II), Elliot Quest, and Phoenotopia: Awakening; all of these games feature side-scrolling combat areas connected by a larger top-down overworld map and comprise a small genre of Zelda II-like games.
