= Great Sea =

Great Sea may refer to:

- Belegaer, a fictional sea in Lord of the Rings
- Great Sea, a fictional setting in The Legend of Zelda video game series
- Mediterranean Sea, called the Great Sea in the Bible
