= Universe of The Legend of Zelda =

Fictional universe

Hyrule Castle and Castle Town in their prime as depicted in Breath of the Wild

The Legend of Zelda is a video game franchise created by video game designers Shigeru Miyamoto and Takashi Tezuka and mainly developed and published by Nintendo. The universe of the Legend of Zelda series consists of various lands, the most predominant being Hyrule. (Note: Japanese: ハイラル, Hepburn: Hairaru) The franchise is set within a fantasy world reminiscent of medieval Europe which consists of several recurring locations, races and creatures. The world was also partially inspired by Miyamoto and designer Hidemaro Fujibayashi's home town, Kyoto. The most prominent race in the series are the Hylians, a humanoid race with elfin features identifiable by their long, pointed ears. The series' lore contains a creation myth, several fictional alphabets, the most prominent being Hylian, and a fictional almost-universal currency, the rupee. The games involve the protagonists Link and Princess Zelda battling monsters to rescue the various lands they are in, and defeat a villain, which is often the series' main antagonist, Ganon. Link is usually the main player character in these settings, but players primarily play as Zelda in 2024's Echoes of Wisdom. Nintendo developed the series' lore into a timeline that spans thousands of years across its history.

Hyrule was created as the original setting for 1986's The Legend of Zelda and has remained the main environment for successive games in the series. Inspired by dungeon crawlers, Miyamoto and Tezuka developed a high fantasy world in the form of a 2D map filled with monsters, puzzles and dungeons. Hyrule transitioned to a 3D environment with the development of Ocarina of Time, released on the Nintendo 64 in 1998. For Breath of the Wild, released on the Wii U and Nintendo Switch in 2017, Nintendo developed Hyrule into a seamless open world. Since the launch of the original game, the series has been a commercial and critical success and introduced landmark innovations in world design that have influenced numerous developers in the video game industry.

== Overview ==
The Legend of Zelda series is set in a fantasy world that first appeared in the original The Legend of Zelda, which was developed and published by Nintendo. (Note: Most subsequent mainline games are developed or co-developed by Nintendo Entertainment Analysis & Development and its successor Nintendo Entertainment Planning & Development, with the exception of Oracle of Seasons, Oracle of Ages, Four Swords, and The Minish Cap, which were developed by Capcom's Flagship studio.) The game introduced Hyrule as the series' primary setting along with the series' protagonists Link and Princess Zelda, (Note: Satoru Takizawa, the art director of Twilight Princess, Breath of the Wild, and Tears of the Kingdom, described Zelda as the heroine.) and primary antagonist Ganon. Link has been the primary player character since the start of the series, though he is only playable in the prologue of Echoes of Wisdom. The storyline of each game varies, but follows a common overarching plot that involves Link, a Hylian boy or young man, traveling through Hyrule or another land to save the world from evil, which is typically Ganon. He is often guided in these plots by Zelda, a Hylian girl or young woman, usually (Note: There is no royal family or Kingdom of Hyrule in the time period of Skyward Sword.) from Hyrule's royal family, who appears in every game in the series except for Link's Awakening and Tri Force Heroes, and is the main player character in Echoes of Wisdom. A recurring plot element in the games is Ganon's attempts to obtain the Triforce, a mystical artifact introduced in the first Legend of Zelda that will enable him to possess ultimate power. (Note: The symbolism and pattern of the Triforce appear in Breath and the Wild and Tears of the Kingdom, although Ganon's desire to obtain a physical object like this does not. In Tears of the Kingdom Ganon instead seeks the power of an ancient artifact called a secret stone (秘石, Hiseki).) Although Link and Zelda have similar appearances in each game, there are different characters who go by those names throughout the series who appear whenever evil threatens the world. (Note: Not every Zelda title introduces a new Link or Zelda. Eight games—The Adventure of Link, Link's Awakening, Majora's Mask, Oracle of Seasons, Oracle of Ages, Phantom Hourglass, Tri Force Heroes, and Tears of the Kingdom—are direct sequels set in the era of one or more earlier releases, regardless of which order the Oracle games are played.) Skyward Sword was established as the beginning of the series' history and involves the antagonist Demise cursing the first incarnations of Link and Zelda so they reincarnate in an endless cycle to protect Hyrule from evil.

== Hyrule ==
=== Concept and design ===
I went hiking and found a lake. It was quite a surprise for me to stumble upon it. When I traveled around the country without a map, trying to find my way, stumbling on amazing things as I went, I realized how it felt to go on an adventure like this[.]

— Shigeru Miyamoto, on his inspiration for The Legend of Zelda

Japanese video game designer Shigeru Miyamoto conceived the land of Hyrule as the setting for the original The Legend of Zelda (1986), describing it as "a miniature garden that you can put into a drawer and revisit anytime you like". He drew his inspiration from the Kyoto countryside that he had explored in his childhood and wanted to recreate the experience of adventure and discovery. Alongside writer Takashi Tezuka, Miyamoto created a fantasy world in the style of fantasy authors like Tolkien, which was viewed from a top-down perspective. It was populated with colourful characters, monsters and dungeons for the player to explore.

==== 2D world design ====
Miyamoto and Tezuka started working on The Legend of Zelda during the development of Super Mario Bros. (1985). Initially, the game did not feature an overworld. In Hyrule Historia, Miyamoto said that Nintendo aimed to develop a launch title for the Famicom Disk System. An early game was initially designed to make use of the Disk System's ability to rewrite data, allowing players to create dungeons and explore other players' creations. He explained: "We made a one-player game with dungeons under mountains that surrounded Death Mountain, but we couldn't shake that "I want to play above ground, too!" feeling, so we added forests and lakes, and eventually Hyrule Field".

The first specifications were drawn up on a whiteboard by Miyamoto and then copied onto a document on 1 February 1985. The document detailed early concepts for items and enemies that would later feature in the game, such as a compass, bows and arrows and a boomerang, and "Hakkai", an early name given to Ganon. This was developed into rough sketches for various items and enemies within the following two weeks. The name for the game had not yet been decided, so the title was simply labelled "Adventure". Long paper was used to create the first land map of Hyrule, which was developed by Tezuka and Miyamoto sitting side by side and drawing together. Miyamoto said that the name "Hyrule" seemed like the perfect choice during a discussion to find a name for a high-fantasy region. In Japan, The Legend of Zelda game was released as The Hyrule Fantasy, which was almost chosen as the name for the entire franchise, but was dropped after the first game. Miyamoto said this could have been due to the name being too similar to Final Fantasy, which was released in December 1987.

The original Hyrule map was designed to encourage exploration and discovery, requiring up to several hours to navigate. The map is nonlinear, so players are free to choose from several unmarked paths, with just a few areas being inaccessible at the start. Miyamoto was influenced by The Black Onyx (1984) and Ultima (1981), two games that centre around fantasy dungeon crawling. The Zelda world was defined by its mazes, hidden rooms and treasures. The game's nine dungeons were designed to be difficult to locate, forcing players to uncover the secrets of the map with little help. In addition to its underworld, the Hyrule map consists of a large overworld created out of a grid structure that is much larger than can be displayed on a single screen. It is 16 blocks wide and eight blocks high and comprises 128 areas. Miyamoto said that maps for the game were included in North America: "The maps included various hints, but to be honest, I thought it would be more enjoyable to play the game without any help. So we sealed the map, with a message reading 'You should only use the map and strategic tips as a last resort'". Players were required to begin their adventure in the centre of Hyrule and use instinct alone to find an old man inside a cave who gives Link a sword and declares, "It's dangerous to go alone!". While navigating Hyrule's overworld and its many dangerous enemies, players must eventually find the dungeons, which each feature various enemies, items and a boss.

The concept of a role-playing game was a new experience for players in the 1980s. The gameplay diverged from the fast-paced games typically found in arcades, or home console games with a similar "infectious energy" to them like Super Mario Bros. By offering players an open world to explore, puzzles to solve and a fantasy story that centres on a protagonist embarking on an adventure to save a princess from an evil villain and bring peace to Hyrule. The new game concept caused concern with Nintendo's management. In 2003, Miyamoto stated in an interview for Superplay magazine: "I remember that we were very nervous, because The Legend Of Zelda was our first game that forced the players to think about what they should do next. We were afraid that gamers would become bored and stressed by the new concept". During the testing phase, players complained about getting lost inside the game's dungeons, but rather than making the game more simplistic, Miyamoto decided to make it more challenging by removing Link's sword at the beginning of the game and forcing players to locate it. He wanted to encourage players to communicate with each other while solving the game's puzzles.

A Link to the Past (1991) introduced a dark version of Hyrule Kingdom: a corrupted land, often caused by Ganon, known in its first iteration as the Dark World. The game, as well as some later installments, had Link travel between similar-looking versions of Hyrule or other lands (Note: Link controls the different seasons of Holodrum in 2001's Oracle of Seasons, and corrects the flow of time between Labrynna's present and hundreds of years in the past in 2001's Oracle of Ages.)—one version without an evil influence and one with—as "a clever way to re-use assets and save precious cartridge space" while investing the player in their resolve to save the world.

The fantasy characters of Hyrule, and the universe of The Legend of Zelda as a whole, were partially inspired by the American television series Twin Peaks (1990–2017). In a joint interview, Zelda producer Eiji Aonuma and SRD president Toshihiko Nakago considered Link's Awakening (1993), with Yoshiaki Koizumi in charge of the story, to be the first time the series had a proper plot. Tezuka had made the suggestion to make the characters of Link's Awakening "suspicious types" like in Twin Peaks. Aonuma and the interviewer, former Nintendo president Satoru Iwata, believed that this broadened the possibilities of characters and stories that could appear in later Legend of Zelda games.

==== Transition to 3D ====
Hyrule continued to evolve over the course of successive games. The transition from a 2D to 3D world occurred with the release of Ocarina of Time (1998), due to the capabilities of the Nintendo 64, which gave players the opportunity to experience a more realistic game environment. The 3D world was also accompanied by an expanding fictional lore that laid the foundation for other games in the series within an official fictional timeline. The game's dungeons were each unique and connected to a specific area of Hyrule and its inhabitants. Several recurring races, such as the Gorons, Zora and Gerudo were introduced and given a distinct history and culture. Hyrule Field, (Note: ハイラル平原, Hairaru Heigen) an expansive open grassy area, was positioned at the centre of Hyrule, acting as a hub that connects other areas to create the illusion of a vast world.

Due to concerns about the limitations of the Nintendo 64, Miyamoto initially conceived the game taking place within a central hub in the confines of Ganon's Castle, similar to Peach's Castle in Super Mario 64 (1996). He described Ocarina of Time as a "huge project" due to the fact that it involved making the game environment from 3D polygons and was larger in scale than anything that he had previously worked on. He said that he had approached the game by first focusing on what types of characters he wanted to include, rather than on the story or the game functions. Ocarina of Time was designed with several innovations to help the player navigate the expansive 3D world and interact with the environment. The camera system was designed to integrate with the 3D world of Hyrule, giving the player a sense of perspective and tracking the movements of Link. The game's Z-targeting system was created to provide the player with a simple way to lock on and interact with objects, characters and enemies in the game world. The game also made use of context sensitive controls by using the A button for a range of interactions, such as mounting a horse or opening a treasure chest. These features were landmarks for Nintendo and influenced 3D world development within the games industry.

During development, the staff spent less time on developing the dungeons. According to Miyamoto: "Instead of mapping your way through a maze, I think what's more important is a sense of dread, a sense of pressure, and of course an opportunity for finding secrets and solving puzzles—we should be pursuing an emotional immediacy, the sense that you are really there". Hyrule and its characters in Ocarina of Time were depicted in an art style that drifted towards Western fantasy, although Miyamoto said there was no intentional replication of cultural elements from one specific country.

==== Open air concept ====
Aonuma approached Breath of the Wild (2017) by breaking the conventions of previous games. He explained that in Ocarina of Time, the game world featured "routes" to help players navigate the 3D environment without getting lost, but that certain handholding and blockages had caused players to feel frustrated. By contrast, Breath of the Wild's Hyrule was designed to allow the player to explore a vast world in any way they liked. Nintendo's senior product marketing manager Bill Trinen described the game as "open air": "I look at this game and I see a world that is fully integrated into the exploration and the adventure. It's not just a world that you're passing through. It's sort of a world that you're a part of". The game world benefited from advancements in Nintendo hardware. Earlier games had been restricted by the available technology, creating the need to separate Hyrule into individual connecting areas, but Breath of the Wild's game world could be experienced as a seamless environment on the Wii U and Nintendo Switch. The concept of an "open air" environment began during work on The Wind Waker (2002). Aonuma said that he wanted to remove the small connecting areas of The Wind Waker and replace them with open expanses, but the world ended up feeling smaller than he intended.

In Breath of the Wild, the fact that the world is supported by a coherent physics engine has a major effect on the possible actions. It sounds obvious, but for example, if you push down a rock, it's going to roll according to the slope. We wanted people to be able to feel things in a "realistic" way, to break or move around big objects in the game and believe they could have had the same feeling in real life. This physically lived experience is very important[.]

— Eiji Aonuma on realism in Breath of the Wild's game world

Breath of the Wild's open world was inspired by other video games. The game's director Hidemaro Fujibayashi named Minecraft (Note: Fully released in 2011, but marks its anniversaries based on its public alpha release in 2009.) and Terraria (2011) as his inspirations for "the sense of adventure, exploration and how it inspired curiosity". Aonuma also mentioned several other games that he had played, including The Witcher (2007–), Far Cry (2004–) and The Elder Scrolls V: Skyrim (2011). He also cited Skyward Sword (2011) as the basis for many of the world's mechanics, such as the ability to climb and explore between areas. The development team began Breath of the Wild by working on a prototype of Hyrule that looked 2D (Note: It was not actually 2D, but a fixed 3D perspective with elements that resembled the original 1986 game.) to test interactions between objects. This was developed into a complex physics and chemistry engine that would present a higher level of realism. The chemistry engine allowed for elements, such as fire, water and electricity to interact with each other and objects in the game world. This was designed to provide the player with a more interactive gameplay that was coined "chemical reaction play". Hyrule in Breath of the Wild was depicted using an art style that was based on the stylised visuals of The Wind Waker but developed into a more realistic, detailed style. The civilization of the Hylians was developed with a focus on their castle in the style of medieval Europe to return to the roots of the series, while the ancient technological features of the Sheikah were inspired by the Jōmon period of Japanese history.

Fujibayashi stated that the layout of Hyrule in Breath of the Wild was inspired in part by his hometown of Kyoto: "I took a map of Kyoto and overlaid it on the game world, and I tried to imagine going to places that I know in Kyoto. I'd think 'It takes this much time to get from point A to point B, so how does that translate to the game?' And that's how we started mapping out the world in Breath of the Wild". The development team used landmarks in Kyoto as a way of comparing the distance between landmarks in the game world, which helped staff during the development of the game. This measurement of distance allowed Hyrule to be scaled up to an enormous world that appears twelve times the size of its predecessor in Twilight Princess (2006).

For Tears of the Kingdom (2023), Aonuma and Fujibayashi used the same map of Hyrule as the one players experienced in Breath of the Wild to create a continuation of the same world. Hyrule was extensively expanded, by introducing Sky Islands to the map to place emphasis on vertical gameplay. In addition to its sky expansion, the game introduced the Depths, a vast pitch-black area beneath the surface of Hyrule. Aonuma said the development team had learned lessons from Skyward Sword, where Link was restricted by the hardware to descend from particular points. He explained that the team had wanted to create the ability to "traverse a world that's not only horizontally connected in a single world, but vertically connected as well", noting the sense of freedom the player experiences by diving into that.

=== Depiction ===
Flags of Hyrule from Breath of the Wild

The Kingdom of Hyrule, (Note: ハイラル王国, Hairaru Ōkoku) a medieval-based fantasy land, is the main setting of the series, which first appeared in The Legend of Zelda. Many of its areas have appeared throughout the series, such as Hyrule Castle, the Lost Woods, Kakariko Village, Death Mountain and Lake Hylia.

Hyrule was formed by three goddesses: Din, (Note: ディン) Farore, (Note: フロル, Furoru) and Nayru. (Note: ネール, Nēru) It is established in Ocarina of Time that Din created the physical geography of the realm, Nayru created the physical laws to govern it, and Farore created the races to uphold the law and the flora and fauna that inhabit the world. After the goddesses completed their tasks, they departed for the heavens, leaving behind three golden triangles containing their power to govern all things; this relic became known as the Triforce. The creation myth was elaborated upon in Echoes of Wisdom, with the goddesses creating the world to be a prison for a primordial chaos entity named Null that had previously consumed anything that tried to form within the void. Skyward Sword expanded on this history by detailing the rise of Demon King Demise and his dark forces, who attempt to take the Triforce and destroy the world. The goddess Hylia stays to protect the Triforce and leads an army of free people into battle to weaken Demise and seal him away from the world. The realm was eventually named Hyrule after its dominant race, the Hylians, who established a kingdom across the land. The kingdom is ruled by the Royal Family of Hyrule, into which the various incarnations of Princess Zelda are often born.

The Hylian alphabet is a cipher of either English or Japanese that first appears in A Link to the Past, where it is identified as "the ancient language of the Hylians" and is composed of symbols that Link must translate to progress. In Japan, an explanation of the Hylian alphabet was written on the back of the instruction manual for The Wind Waker with a phonographic writing system, or syllabary, like the Japanese language. Since its first appearance, five more Hylian scripts have been developed and deciphered: the Old Hylian Syllabary used in Ocarina of Time, the Modern Hylian Syllabary used in The Wind Waker, the Hylian Alphabet used in Skyward Sword, the Hylian Alphabet used in A Link Between Worlds, and the Hylian Alphabet used in Twilight Princess. The first three are used for transcribing Japanese, while the latter three are used to transcribe English, totaling six variations of written Hylian. Additional languages have subsequently appeared in the series. The language of the Gerudo was introduced in Ocarina of Time, a written and spoken language that is similar to Hylian and is written in elongated, wispy letters. The Sheikah language was introduced in Breath of the Wild and consists of a complete alphabet of square-shaped symbols. Players have deciphered these languages to translate numerous signs and inscriptions commonly found around Hyrule.

The almost-universal currency of Hyrule is the rupee. (Note: Mon, Bubbul Gems, and Poe souls are used as currency for individual characters in Hyrule in the series. Outside of Hyrule, in Oracle of Seasons Subrosia uses ore chunks, and in Oracle of Ages the Tokay from Labrynna use a barter system.) Although it shares its name with a real-world currency unit, Miyamoto said in an interview that this was not intentional and that he chose the word because it seemed cute and sounded like "rubies". Rupees resemble hexagonal crystals or gems and come in various colors that determine their value. In the manual for the original game, the currency was called rubies, but this was changed to rupees in later games. Subsequent games introduced more colors and sizes for rupees, each denoting a specific value. Generally, green rupees have the least value, while gold and silver rupees have the most.

=== Hyrulean geography ===
A map of Hyrule depicted in The Legend of Zelda Collector's Puzzle

Although the geography of Hyrule varies from game to game, it typically features several recurring geographical landmarks, which appear in different locations relative to each other depending on the game.

- Death Mountain (Note: デスマウンテン, Desu Maunten) is a large volcanic mountain. It is in the northern part of Hyrule in many games, but in The Adventure of Link it is in the south. It first appeared in the original The Legend of Zelda and has appeared through the series up to Tears of the Kingdom. Twilight Princess reveals it is part of the Eldin Mountains, a mountain range in the Eldin Province (Note: オルディン, Orudin) (or Region, in later games). The main inhabitants of Death Mountain are the Gorons, a race of rock people that mine the mountains in search of food; the mountains are littered with caves as a result of their mining activities.
- Ganon's Castle (Note: ガノン城, Ganon-jō) is Ganon's fortress, which has acted as the battleground between him and Link in Ocarina of Time and The Wind Waker. In Ocarina of Time, when Link travels to the future, it has been built in place of Hyrule Castle.
- Hyrule Castle (Note: ハイラル城, Hairaru-jō) is the home of Hyrule's royal family, which first appeared in A Link to the Past. It is a symbol of the power of the Hyrulean monarchy and is frequently the main target of Hyrule's enemies, particularly Ganon. It is often a central area that Link visits during his quest.
- Kakariko Village (Note: カカリコ村, Kakariko-mura) is a village that first appears in A Link to the Past and has since reappeared in Ocarina of Time, Four Swords Adventures, Twilight Princess, A Link Between Worlds, Breath of the Wild, Tears of the Kingdom, and Echoes of Wisdom. Kakariko Village is often portrayed as a small, prosperous town that was originally founded by the Sheikah. In Twilight Princess, most of the villagers have turned into Shadow Beasts, making the town resemble a ghost town. In Breath of the Wild, the village has survived the Great Calamity and is inhabited by the Sheikah.
- Lake Hylia (Note: ハイリア湖, Hairia-ko) is the largest freshwater lake in Hyrule. It commonly features collectible items and dungeons, and is often where Link encounters members of the Zora race, especially in their hostile "River Zora" forms.
- The Lost Woods (Note: 迷いの森, Mayoi no Mori) is a large enchanted forest that appears in various games, starting with The Legend of Zelda. It is home to the Kokiri, Koroks and Fairies, and its maze-like structure leads travelers in circles unless they take the correct path through the forest. Rumors state that those who become lost are turned into Stalfos. In several games, the Great Deku Tree (Note: デクの樹, Deku no Ki) and/or the Master Sword can be found in a shrine there.
- Spectacle Rock (Note: めがね岩, Megane Iwa) is a location consisting of two large rock formations next to each other that resemble a pair of eyeglasses. It housed the final dungeon in The Legend of Zelda. It is usually associated with Death Mountain, but is located in the Gerudo Highlands (Note: ゲルド高地, Gerudo Kōchi) in Breath of the Wild and Tears of the Kingdom. Spectacle Rock also appears in Zelda II: The Adventure of Link, A Link to the Past, and A Link Between Worlds.
- The Temple of Time (Note: 時の神殿, Toki no Shinden) is the temple that houses the Master Sword in Ocarina of Time and Twilight Princess, and is where the Master Sword can be used in these games to traverse time. In Skyward Sword, Zelda and Impa go to the Temple of Time in the Lanayru Desert (Note: ラネール砂漠, Ranēru Sabaku) to travel through time, although not with the use of the Master Sword or the Goddess Sword. In Twilight Princess it serves as a dungeon, and in Skyward Sword it is located at the end of the Lanayru Mining Facility (Note: ラネール錬石場, Ranēru Rensekijō) dungeon. In the era of Breath of the Wild and Tears of the Kingdom, there are two Temples of Time. Each one is located on the two games' tutorial areas—Hyrule's Great Plateau (Note: 始まりの台地, Hajimari no Daichi; lit. 'Plateau of Beginning') in Breath of the Wild and the Great Sky Island (Note: 始まりの空島, Hajimari no Sorajima; lit. 'Sky Island of Beginning') in Tears of the Kingdom (Note: While the Great Plateau can be reached in Tears of the Kingdom, the Great Sky Island is inaccessible in Breath of the Wild.)—and each Temple of Time contains a way of allowing the player to progress past the starting area. Link opens a doorway in the Temple of Time at the beginning of Tears of the Kingdom to pass the broken Master Sword on to the missing Princess Zelda in the past. The Breath of the Wild version of the Temple of Time is the only one in the series to not have any connection to time travel.

== Objects ==
=== Triforce ===
The Triforce is represented as three conjoined golden triangles.

The Triforce, (Note: トライフォース, Toraifōsu) also called the "Power of the Gods" and the "Golden Triangle", is a triangular sacred relic left behind by the three Golden Goddesses after they created Hyrule. It is made up of three smaller triangles known as the Triforce of Power, the Triforce of Wisdom, and the Triforce of Courage. These embody the essences of their respective goddesses, and present a power struggle and balance of morality between the central characters, Ganon, Zelda and Link. The Triforce first appeared in the original game as a focal point of the plot, which involves Ganon stealing the Triforce of Power and Link searching for the scattered pieces of the Triforce of Wisdom to stop him and protect Hyrule from evil. The Triforce of Courage was introduced in The Adventure of Link as the third piece. When united, the Triforce allows the person who touches it to make a wish that usually lasts until they die or the wish is granted. If the person who finds it does not possess a balance of the three virtues it represents, the pieces will split into its three components, leaving the finder with the one that represents the characteristic they value most.

=== Master Sword ===
The Master Sword, (Note: マスターソード, Masutā Sōdo) also known as the "Blade of Evil's Bane", the "Sword of Resurrection", or the "Sword that seals the darkness" is a divine, magic sword and Link's signature weapon. It is one of the few weapons capable of harming Ganon and acts as a key to the Sacred Realm. It was first introduced in A Link to the Past, it has the power to "repel evil", which enables it to overcome powerful dark magic and slay evil and demonic beings that cannot be harmed by conventional weaponry. Skyward Sword reveals that it was originally known as the Goddess Sword, which is inhabited by a sentient female spirit named Fi. Near the end of the game, the Goddess Sword transforms into the Master Sword after being infused with the Three Sacred Flames, with Fi's spirit form ceasing to be after the Master Sword absorbs Demise's remains. The sword traditionally rests in a stone pedestal hidden in sacrosanct locations indigenous to Hyrule, such as the Temple of Time or the Lost Woods. Like the Sword in the Stone, the Master Sword can only be removed by someone who is worthy of wielding it.

== Other lands and worlds ==
Hyrule is the main recurring setting of The Legend of Zelda series, but several games are set outside Hyrule in other lands, realms and parallel worlds. The geographical relationship between Hyrule and these other worlds is not clearly defined.

- The Dark World (Note: 闇の世界, Yami no Sekai) is a parallel world to Hyrule that appears in A Link to the Past. It is a darker version of Hyrule, which is referred to as the Light World.
- The Depths is the underworld of Tears of the Kingdom, which is scattered with ruins, and mirrors the surface of Hyrule. It is connected to the surface by the chasms across Hyrule and receives very little light, being pitch-black until Link activates the Lightroots located across it.
- The Great Sea (Note: 大海原, Ōunabara) is the setting of The Wind Waker, formed after a deluge flooded Hyrule. Only a few mountaintops are still visible above the water, which form the islands and archipelagos of the Great Sea. Due to the relatively small size of these islands, the large expanses of ocean between each island require the player to use charts to navigate between them.
- Holodrum (Note: ホロドラム, Horodoramu) is a land that Link travels to in Oracle of Seasons, where Din finds him and is subsequently captured by the General of Darkness, Onox, causing the four seasons in Holodrum to fall into chaos. Holodrum is protected by a huge tree called a Maku Tree. Link eventually dispels the darkness using a Huge Maku Seed.
- Hytopia (Note: ドレース王国, Dorēsu Ōkoku) is a kingdom that is the main setting of Tri Force Heroes. It is ruled by Princess Styla, who has been cursed to wear a drab jumpsuit.
- Koholint Island (Note: コホリント島, Kohorinto-tō) is the setting of Link's Awakening, which Link washes ashore on after a storm and which has a giant egg atop its highest peak. To escape the island, Link must awaken the Wind Fish, which he later discovers will cause the island to disappear, as it exists in its dreams. He ultimately achieves this goal, but the island ceases to exist.
- Labrynna (Note: ラブレンヌ, Raburennu) is a land that appears in Oracle of Ages. In a similar storyline to that of Holodrum, the land of Labrynna is thrown into chaos after Nayru is possessed by the sorceress Veran, causing the flow of time to be disrupted.
- Lorule (Note: ロウラル, Rouraru) is a parallel world to Hyrule that appears in A Link Between Worlds. It is similar to Hyrule in geography and is ruled by Princess Zelda's Lorulean counterpart, Princess Hilda. Like Hyrule, Lorule originally had its own Triforce, which was the source of various conflicts. However, the Royal Family of Lorule decided to destroy the Triforce in an attempt to put an end to conflict, only to bring calamity to their world as a result.
- New Hyrule (Note: 新生ハイラル王国, Shinsei Hairuru Ōkoku) is a kingdom founded by Link and Tetra following the events of Phantom Hourglass which appears in Spirit Tracks. New Hyrule is home to the titular Spirit Tracks, magical train tracks created by the Spirits of Good, the guardian deities of the country. The Tracks connect the four sections of the continent and allow for travel by train between them.
- Skyloft (Note: スカイロフト, Sukairofuto) is a collection of large floating islands in Skyward Sword, which were created when the Goddess Hylia used the last of her power to raise what was left of the surviving Hylians along with a plot of land that was still free during the Great War with Demise. Below the clouds lies "the Surface".
- The Still World is another world that appears in Echoes of Wisdom, which is connected to Hyrule through rifts that each lead to a different section of it. People, objects, and terrain transported there are frozen in time.
- Termina (Note: タルミナ, Tarumina) is a parallel world to Hyrule that serves as the main setting of Majora's Mask. Link enters it through a portal deep within the Lost Woods. The land and its citizens are very similar to that of Hyrule. Termina is split into four distinct regions, guarded by four giant deities: the swampy Woodfall, home of the Deku Scrubs, to the south; the icy Snowhead Mountains of the Gorons to the north; Great Bay, home of the Zora to the west; and the undead wastelands of Ikana Canyon to the east. Its capital, Clock Town, lies in the center.
- The Twilight Realm (Note: 影の世界, Kage no Sekai) is a parallel world to Hyrule that appears in Twilight Princess, which is inhabited by the Twili. Its ruler Midna was overthrown by antagonist Zant, who seeks to gain power over the Twilight Realm and transforms the Twili into Shadow Beasts. Link and Midna work together to cleanse the twilight from Hyrule and defeat Zant.
- The World of the Ocean King is the setting of Phantom Hourglass, which takes place after the events of The Wind Waker. Its world is similar to the Great Sea, with several islands located on the ocean, but is a parallel world reached via a ghost ship.

== Characters ==
Despite most games in the series nominally taking place centuries apart, The Legend of Zelda often features many recurring characters. The silent protagonist Link and Princess Zelda (Note: When Zelda becomes the player character in Echoes of Wisdom, she is silent to the player.) are reincarnated in most Zelda games, while the antagonistic force Ganon, the final boss of most Zelda games, (Note: Ganon has fewer appearances than Link and Zelda, but including his incarnations as Ganondorf in The Wind Waker and Twilight Princess, Demise in Skyward Sword, Yuga Ganon in A Link Between Worlds, and the Demon Dragon in Tears of the Kingdom, he is the final boss of 12 of the 21 games as of September 2024. Two further games' antagonists in Link's Awakening and Echoes of Wisdom copy Ganon's form.) born from the primordial evil Demise, repeatedly returns in a new form as well. Other figures who reappear across the series include Zelda's caretaker Impa and the fairy-obsessed man Tingle. In Ocarina of Time, Majora's Mask, and Twilight Princess, Link obtains a horse named Epona. (Note: Epona is available in Breath of the Wild and Tears of the Kingdom by scanning an Amiibo.)

Link is frequently accompanied by a companion in Zelda games, starting with Navi in Ocarina of Time. Characters like her, Midna in Twilight Princess, and Fi in Skyward Sword, serve a tutorial function in their respective games and comment on events as they transpire in the story. In Echoes of Wisdom, Zelda is followed a similar companion called Tri. The supporting cast of Breath of the Wild, featuring characters such as Purah, Prince Sidon, and Urbosa, has proven to be popular among fans of the series.

=== Link ===
Link is the silent protagonist of the series and the main playable character. He is a Hylian youth of varying age who has traditionally been depicted wearing a green cap and tunic. He has appeared as the hero of nearly every game in the series, usually as a new iteration of the character, though some iterations have made more than one appearance. While the details vary, he typically embarks on a journey across Hyrule to save Princess Zelda and defeat evil, usually in the form of Ganon. To defeat his enemies, he typically obtains and wields the legendary Master Sword. Each incarnation of Link is humble, brave, and worthy to bear the Triforce of Courage, one of the three pieces that form the Triforce. As protagonist, Link has appeared in related media, including spin-off games such as Hyrule Warriors, comics and manga, and other video game series, such as Mario Kart 8 and the Super Smash Bros. series. Although he is mainly silent in the video games, he does speak in the Legend of Zelda cartoon series and the CD-i games from The Legend of Zelda series produced by Philips. Link was recognised as the second greatest video game character of all time behind Mario in the Guinness World Records Gamer's Edition 2011. Nintendo Life describes Link as "one of gaming's most iconic heroes", while GamesRadar describes him as, "one of the most enduring heroic archetypes". Time named him as one of the most influential video game characters of all time.

=== Princess Zelda ===
Princess Zelda is Hyrule's princess and the guardian of the Triforce of Wisdom. While older titles portray her as a "princess in peril" who Link needed to save from Ganon, since Ocarina of Time she has been developed as a more fully realized character, particularly in Breath of the Wild. Zelda is the reincarnation of the goddess Hylia in mortal form and usually depicted as the bearer of the Triforce of Wisdom. She is capable of using various magical powers to aid Link, including light magic to seal away Ganon, although several games have depicted her using the Bow of Light. Zelda occasionally has aliases and alter egos, including Sheik in Ocarina of Time and Tetra in The Wind Waker and Phantom Hourglass. Despite being the titular character, Zelda has only been playable in Spirit Tracks and Echoes of Wisdom in the main series and Zelda: The Wand of Gamelon and Zelda's Adventure of the CD-i games. However, she is playable in the Hyrule Warriors spin-off games, Cadence of Hyrule, and in the Super Smash Bros. series since Melee. She was named as one of the most iconic female game characters of all time by Digital Spy. Along with Link, she was counted as one of the greatest video game characters of all time by the 2011 Guinness World Record Gamer's Edition.

=== Ganon ===
Ganon is the series' primary villain and final boss. His specific motives vary across games, but general themes include seeking the Triforce for power and destruction and to conquer Hyrule. Like Link and Zelda, he is the bearer of one third of the Triforce: the Triforce of Power. Ganon was introduced as the main antagonist of the original The Legend of Zelda in the form of a blue boar and his role and appearance has since evolved over time. Over the course of the series, he has generally appeared in two forms: Ganon, a monstrous, demonic pig-like form, and Ganondorf, a humanoid Gerudo form first introduced in Ocarina of Time. In Breath of the Wild, he appears in two forms in the final boss fight as Calamity Ganon and Dark Beast Ganon. In Tears of the Kingdom, Ganondorf is known as the Demon King. His portrayal varies across each game in the series, ranging from a mute beast to a powerful warlock with formidable sword skills, but generally he is so powerful that only Link and Zelda are capable of defeating him. In addition to the main Zelda series, Ganon/Ganondorf appears as a playable character in the Hyrule Warriors spin-off games and the Super Smash Bros. series since Melee. Ganon was recognized as one of the greatest video game villains of all time in a 2013 poll for Guinness World Records 2013 Gamer's Edition. In 2022, GamesRadar named him as one of the most iconic gaming villains of all time.

=== Impa ===
Impa (Note: インパ, Inpa) was introduced in the game manual for the original The Legend of Zelda as an elderly woman and member of the Sheikah who acts as caretaker to Princess Zelda and seeks out Link to save her from Ganon. She returns in Zelda II: The Adventure of Link, where she acts as a guide to Link. In Ocarina of Time, she plays a major role as a young warrior and Zelda's guardian. Her character design is similar in Skyward Sword, where she appears in both a young and elderly form. Breath of the Wild depicts her as a Sheikah elder in Kakariko Village, where she is about 120 years old. She is a playable character in Hyrule Warriors and Hyrule Warriors: Age of Calamity as a young warrior. In Tears of the Kingdom, she has retired and is investigating the Geoglyphs that have appeared around Hyrule, tasking Link with finding the Dragon's Tears and the memories they hold. Impa's characterisation was praised by Jenni Lada of Siliconera, who admired her for being an intelligent warrior and a respected character.

Impa's character design has evolved significantly over the course of the series, having been depicted in various forms and ages to fulfill various roles in the games. In her first appearance, Impa was created as an elderly woman for the instruction manual of The Legend of Zelda. In Ocarina of Time, she appears as a slimmer, younger character with a sturdy build and hair tied back in a ponytail. By contrast, she was designed as an overweight woman for Oracle of Seasons. In Skyward Sword, she appears as younger and older versions of the same character due to the storyline shifting in time and is dressed in Sheikah attire. The younger version of Impa was given an androgynous appearance, while her older version wears a costume designed to reflect the passage of time, including a pendulum braid and a triangular robe that becomes a sundial. In Breath of the Wild, she appears as a much older village elder with a short, shrunken stature. In Hyrule Warriors, she is depicted as an athletic warrior, which is similar to her appearance in Ocarina of Time and her younger form in Skyward Sword. In Hyrule Warriors: Age of Calamity, which features the younger self of her Breath of the Wild incarnation, she is portrayed as a powerful fighter and strongly resembles her future granddaughter, Paya. Impa's design, abilities, and gestures in Age of Calamity drew heavy inspiration from Naruto Uzumaki.

Throughout her many incarnations, she bears the typical traits of the Sheikah tribe, having white hair and red eyes. She also typically displays the Sheikah symbol, an eye with three triangles above and a teardrop below, on her forehead or clothing. As a representative of her people, she wears the unique garments of the Sheikah, which take inspiration from historical Japanese clothing. As a member of the Sheikah, Impa is highly skilled in combat and the use of magic.

=== King of Hyrule ===
The King of Hyrule is the title given to the various ruling monarchs of Hyrule, who are generally the father of Princess Zelda in most incarnations. He appears in many entries, but his presence is often relegated to cameos, backstory, lore, or posthumous appearances as a ghost. In The Minish Cap, Link must rescue King Daltus after Vaati turns him to stone and imprisons him. In The Wind Waker, Daphnes Nohansen Hyrule is later revealed to be the true identity of The King of Red Lions, the sentient red sailboat that accompanies Link and leads him to the Triforce of Courage, also helping Tetra to uncover her true identity as Zelda, ultimately usurping the Triforce to sink Hyrule. He later appears as a playable character in Hyrule Warriors Legends. In Breath of the Wild, the Old Man guides Link throughout the Great Plateau and helps him obtain the paraglider and is eventually revealed to be the spirit of King Rhoam Bosphoramus Hyrule. In the game's backstory, he prepared for the return of Calamity Ganon and put pressure on his daughter Zelda to awaken her sealing powers, but his efforts ended in failure and his death. King Rhoam returns as a playable character in Hyrule Warriors: Age of Calamity.

=== Beedle ===
Beedle, also known as Terry in other localizations, is a traveling merchant who sells Link items. He first appears in The Wind Waker, where he can be found on his boat shop. He reappears in The Minish Cap, Phantom Hourglass, and Spirit Tracks. In Skyward Sword, he travels to Skyloft in a pedal-powered wooden shack with helicopter propellers, which also serves as his shop. In Breath of the Wild and Tears of the Kingdom, he travels on foot with a large backpack, and is often seen at stables.

=== Tingle ===
Tingle is a eccentric middle-aged man who is obsessed with fairies and believes himself to be the reincarnation of one. He first appears in Majora's Mask where he wears a green body suit and floats around on a balloon selling maps. He reappears in Wind Waker where he acts as a map maker. He also appears in Oracle of Ages, Four Swords Adventures and The Minish Cap, and makes small cameos in other games. Tingle has gained notoriety due to being disliked by American players and has not appeared in the main series in a non-cameo capacity since The Minish Cap. He ranked first on IGN's list of the weirdest Zelda characters. Tingle has starred in his own games, including Freshly-Picked Tingle's Rosy Rupeeland and Ripened Tingle's Balloon Trip of Love. He is also a playable character via downloadable content in Hyrule Warriors.

== Races ==
Since the release of the original game, the series has featured several races. Alongside the Hylian race, which established the land of Hyrule, there are various other prominent races, such as the Gorons, Gerudo, Rito and Zora.

- Ancient Robots are a prehistoric mechanical race that appear in Skyward Sword, who Link encounters in the Lanayru Desert. They were created by the Thunder Dragon Lanayru, (Note: ラネール, Ranēru) but their land eventually became a barren desert and they rusted away. However, they can be revived using a Timeshift Stone to change the present to the past. Although the designers expressed concern about including advanced technology in Skyward Sword, they decided that they did not look out of place with a "softer" design resembling the Dogū, which was more befitting of fantasy.
- Deku Scrubs (Note: デクナッツ, Dekunattsu) are creatures with bodies made of nuts and seeds that were introduced in Ocarina of Time. They have red glowing eyes and shoot seeds from their mouths at approaching enemies. They use the leaves that sprout from their heads to hide in a leafy nest. They are sometimes fought as enemies by Link, but some are non-hostile and may do business with and otherwise reason with Hylians. (Note: Depending on the game, Deku Scrubs and their variants will only do business after their seeds are knocked back in their face with a shield.) They have set up homes and businesses in many locations in Hyrule and other lands. Some Deku Scrubs provide important information to make the player progress in the games they appear in. Deku Scrubs have their own kingdom and royal family in Termina in Majora's Mask, and live in a Hyrulean village called Scrubton in Echoes of Wisdom. A variant called Mad Scrubs have flame-colored leaves on their heads and are more aggressive.
- Dragons are a recurring race that usually appear as benevolent guardians or powerful enemies. In Ocarina of Time, Link must slay Volvagia, a dragon boss in the Fire Temple. In The Wind Waker, the Sky Spirit Valoo acts as the godlike dragon and the patron deity of the Rito tribe. When Link arrives on Dragon Roost Island, he defeats the boss Gohma by damaging Valoo's tail. In Twilight Princess, Link encounters the dragon Argorok, who is the boss of the City in the Sky. In Skyward Sword, Link is aided by the three dragons Faron, (Note: フィローネ, Firōne) Eldin, and Lanayru, which guard the three regions of the Surface, also called Faron, Eldin, and Lanayru. In Breath of the Wild and Tears of the Kingdom, the three dragons Dinraal, (Note: オルドラ, Orudora) Naydra, (Note: ネルドラ, Nerudora) and Farosh (Note: フロドラ, Furodora) can be found in several locations around Hyrule. Tears of the Kingdom features two new dragons, the Light Dragon, (Note: 白龍, Hakuryū) which is later revealed to be Zelda transformed after undergoing the process of draconification to restore the shattered Master Sword through sacred power, and the Demon Dragon, (Note: 黒龍, Kokuryū) which is Ganondorf after he undergoes draconification in a last-ditch effort to defeat Link and conquer the world.
- Fairies are magical creatures that appear as small, winged humanoids often obscured by light. They tend to be shy and can be found hiding in many places throughout Hyrule, mainly at fairy fountains or fairy springs. In most games in the series, fairies will heal Link if he manages to catch one; he can also put them in empty bottles to have them heal him later. If Link dies while he has a bottled fairy in his possession, the fairy will automatically resurrect him. Great fairies are powerful, high ranking fairies that use their magic to enchant Link's items into more powerful versions. In Ocarina of Time, the Kokiri form a symbiotic relationship with their guardian fairies, who act as companions and mentors. One of these is Navi, who serves as Link's sidekick and helps him learn about the world outside Kokiri Forest.
- The Gerudo (Note: ゲルド) are a race of human warrior-thieves indigenous to the Gerudo Desert, which bears their name. Their physical traits include scarlet hair, aquiline noses, gold or green eyes, round or pointed ears, and bronzed skin. Like the Amazons, the race consists entirely of women, apart from a single Gerudo male who is born every century and is lawfully crowned king of the tribe, and worshipped like a God king. When there is no male present to be king, leadership is instead entrusted to female chiefs. The Dark Beast Ganon, the main antagonist of the series, takes the form of a Gerudo king called Ganondorf at the beginning of his life. The Gerudo appear as pirates in Majora's Mask, where they live in a fortress by the ocean. In Breath of the Wild, Tears of the Kingdom, and Echoes of Wisdom, they are traders and merchants. As men are not permitted in Gerudo Town, in Breath of the Wild, Link must crossdress as a female to enter. In Tears of the Kingdom Link does not need to enter Gerudo Town in disguise as he is helping the Gerudo warriors mount a defence against attacking Gibdo forces.
- The Gorons (Note: ゴロン) are a race of mountain-dwelling rock people who first appeared in Ocarina of Time. They have the ability to roll along the ground and have a round rock-like physical appearance. Goron culture revolves around brotherhood and strength, usually referring to each other and those they deem strong as "Brother" or "Big Brother". Gorons show high regard for individuals who display great strength and bravery and enjoy matching their strength with others in competition such as sumo wrestling and racing. They live in tribes headed by a patriarch, such as Darunia in Ocarina of Time. They mainly inhabit mountainous areas, such as Death Mountain, and are resistant to intense heat and lava. They also consume rocks and minerals, which they mine from the earth.
- Hylians (Note: ハイリア族, Hairia-zoku) are an elf-like race of humans that predominantly make up the population of Hyrule, most prominently Link and Zelda, in which they established an organized civilization resembling that of medieval Europe. They were created as the first race of Hyrule by the goddess Hylia, born with magic-infused blood said to be a gift from the goddesses that grants them psychic powers and magical skill. Their long pointed ears are said to allow them to hear messages sent by the gods. In Skyward Sword, Hylians live on the floating island of Skyloft and are accompanied by bird-like creatures called Loftwings. Hylians are a fairly diverse species, having variations in skin, hair and eye colour. Due to repeated attacks from enemies, such as Ganon, large Hylian armies exist to protect Hyrule.
- The Kokiri (Note: コキリ族, Kokiri-zoku) are a pixie-like race who inhabit the Kokiri Forest, who branched off from the Hylians due to wanting to live a more natural life as Hyrule continued to industrialize. They are guarded by the Great Deku Tree, whose power causes them to not age once they grow up into kids, and who considers them to be his children. They are cautious and secretive, believing that they will die if they leave the forest. Each one receives a small fairy who serves as their lifelong friend, guardian, and teacher. Link was raised as a Kokiri in Ocarina of Time, but was not born to them, as his Hylian mother entrusted him to the Great Deku Tree when he was an infant. At the end of Ocarina of Time, we see two Kokiri outside the Forest in the Adult Timeline; Saria, the Sage of Forest and Mido, who was Link's childhood nemesis amongst the Kokiri. It is unclear if this means that the Kokiri learned they could survive outside of the forest in the Adult Timeline, or if Mido simply chose to risk leaving. Saria, however, being the sage of Forest, was already shown to leave the forest by appearing in the Sacred Realm after Link freed her in the Forest Temple.
- The Koroks (Note: コログ, Korogu) are plant-like beings that first appeared in The Wind Waker and are said to have been transformed from the Kokiri following the Great Flood. They are small creatures with wood-like bodies and masks made from leaves, with their light weight allowing them to travel by using sprouts as propellers. They leave their home, the "Forest Haven", to plant seeds from the Great Deku Tree all over the world, and return once a year to hold a ceremony and obtain more seeds. In Breath of the Wild and Tears of the Kingdom, Koroks can be found all over Hyrule and their seeds can be traded with Hestu, a large Korok, to upgrade weapon inventory slots. Koroks are difficult to find despite being numerous and are best protected in Korok Forest, (Note: コログの森, Korogu no Mori) a hidden location in the Lost Woods.
- The Oocca (Note: 天空人, Tenkū-jin; lit. 'sky people') are a race of birds with long necks and human-like faces that appear in Twilight Princess. They live in the City in the Sky, (Note: 天空都市, Tenkū Toshi) an airborne city that is the seventh dungeon in Twilight Princess and which Link reaches by launching himself out of an enormous cannon. A female Oocca, Ooccoo (Note: おばちゃん, Oba-chan) can warp the player back to the entrance of the game's dungeons, and her son, Ooccoo Jr, (Note: ぼくちゃん, Boku-chan) warps the player to Ooccoo's location. In Twilight Princess, they are mentioned to be closer to the gods than the Hylians. Some in Hyrule theorize that the Oocca actually evolved into the Hylians, or that they created Hylians and a city in the sky for them to live in.
- Minish, referred to in their native language as Picori, (Note: ピッコル, Pikkoru; inspired by the Koropokkuru) are small humanoid sprites no bigger than a human thumb that live in secret, who first appear in The Minish Cap. They are only visible to children and tend to live in forests, but also appear inside of buildings and holes in and around various spots of Hyrule. There are three variations of the Minish, which are distinguished by their attire: Forest Minish, Town Minish and Mountain Minish. Most Minish are helpful and like to hide valuable objects for others to find, although one Picori, Vaati, became evil after becoming obsessed with human nature.
- The Rito are a race of raptor-like humanoids first introduced in The Wind Waker who—in their original depiction—evolved from the Zora. In The Wind Waker, they live on Dragon Roost Island, a volcanic island on the Great Sea. Their guards are elaborately dressed. They are initially flightless, as they are born without wings; throughout a young Rito's childhood, they are called a Fledgling. After a child reaches a certain age, they must climb the volcano to visit their guardian, the Sky Spirit Valoo, in a coming-of-age ceremony to receive one of his scales, which enables them to grow wings. Most Rito can fly for great distances and hover in place, but some struggle to fly for long periods of time. In Breath of the Wild and Tears of the Kingdom, the Rito reside in Rito Village (Note: リトの村, Rito no Mura) in northwest Hyrule's Hebra region (Note: ヘブラ, Hebura) and tolerate colder climates. Neither game refers to gaining wings from a scale, and in Breath of the Wild the Rito's guardian is a bird-shaped machine known as Divine Beast Vah Medoh. (Note: 神獣 ヴァ・メドー, Shinjū Va Medō) These Rito feature a much more prominent avian design that includes wings and are able to fly using updrafts. Throughout the series, Rito societies have been led by tribal elders, including a nameless chieftain in The Wind Waker, Kaneli (Note: カーン, Kān) in Breath of the Wild, and Teba in Tears of the Kingdom. Prominent Rito characters include Revali, the Rito Champion, and Kass, (Note: カッシーワ, Kasshīwa) a wandering minstrel who displays the Rito's appreciation of music through song.
- The Sheikah (Note: シーカー, Shīkā) are ancient and mysterious ninja-like warriors commonly distinguished by their red eyes and white hair, whose most prominent recurring representative is Zelda's nursemaid and bodyguard Impa. They have a divinely ordained role to protect the royal family of Hyrule. Despite their physical resemblance to Hylians, they are a different race with great technological prowess, as seen in Breath of the Wild with the Guardians, Shrines, Towers, and the Sheikah Slate. (Note: シーカーストーン, Shīkā Sutōn; lit. 'Sheikah Stone') Breath of the Wild and related games also feature a splinter faction called the Yiga Clan, (Note: イーガ団, Īga-dan) formed around Calamity Ganon after the Sheikah were shunned by the kingdom of Hyrule following the first Great Calamity. Along with their leader, Master Kohga, the Yiga are portrayed in a comedic light and characterized by a love of bananas.
- Twili (Note: トワイライトの民, Towairaito no Tami) are a race that inhabit the Twilight Realm and appear in Twilight Princess. They come from a group referred to as the Interlopers, who used extraordinary magic to dominate a war between Hylians for the Triforce and the Sacred Realm. After witnessing this, the Golden Goddesses ordered the Light Spirits to seal their magic in the Fused Shadow; the Interlopers were then banished to the Twilight Realm, a dark mirror world of Hyrule, where they adapted and evolved into the Twili. The most prominent members of their race are Midna, the titular Twilight Princess, and Zant, (Note: ザント, Zanto) who overthrew her with Ganondorf's help to become king of the Twilight.
- The Zonai (Note: ゾナウ, Zonau) are an ancient race that appear in Tears of the Kingdom. Initially referenced through various ruins in Breath of the Wild, they are established in Tears of the Kingdom as the tribe that originally founded Hyrule, with Rauru being the first king alongside his Hylian wife Sonia. In the game, Zonai technology is prominent across Hyrule in the form of Shrines, ruins, Constructs, (Note: ゴーレム, Gōremu; lit. 'golem') and other Zonai devices. They also created the Geoglyphs, which Link investigates during the Main Quest "The Dragon's Tears" along with their respective Dragon's Tears in order to learn more about Zelda's disappearance. In the ancient past, they were created around the Dragon's Tears by individuals who viewed the memories within them. In Creating a Champion, the Zonai are described as magic users who worship the Triforce.
- The Zora (Note: ゾーラ, Zōra) are a race of aquatic piscine humanoids that inhabit Zora's Domain, Lake Hylia, or domains outside Hyrule in Termina and Labrynna. Two different branches exist: "River Zora" introduced in the first Legend of Zelda are more violent and can shoot fire, while "Sea Zora" first seen in Ocarina of Time are generally passive. The names for each branch were retroactively introduced in Oracle of Ages. Both Sea and River Zora have monarchies, either ruled by a king, such as the unnamed River Zora King in A Link to the Past; an unnamed Sea Zora King in Oracle of Ages; Sea Zora Kings Dorephan (Note: ドレファン, Dorefan) in Breath of the Wild, Sidon in Tears of the Kingdom, and Zora De Bon XVI in Ocarina of Time; or queen, such as River Zora Queen Oren in A Link Between Worlds and Sea Zora Queen Rutela (Note: ルテラ, Rutera) in Twilight Princess. Zora have long lifespans and lay eggs to reproduce, which must be kept in cold, clean water to develop healthily, and eggs from the same clutch must be kept together to hatch. Newborn Zora have the appearance of a tadpole.

== Enemies ==
The appearance of some creatures varies across different titles of the series:

- Armos (Note: アモス, Amosu) are animated statues built to guard ancient ruins that come to life and attack when disturbed. They have monstrous appearances and carry a sword and shield. If Link approaches, they will chase after him. They first appeared in The Legend of Zelda.
- Bokoblins (Note: ボコブリン, Bokoburin) are a race of goblin-like creatures, that first appeared in The Wind Waker. Bokoblins come in a variety of colors. They often appear as standard enemies and wield boko sticks, machetes and clubs in The Wind Waker. Though their appearance varies from game to game, the one thing that remains consistent is they wear loincloths with a single skull. In Twilight Princess, they are less common and their role as standard enemies is largely taken over by the Bulblins. In Skyward Sword, Bokoblins are common monsters that serve the Demon Tribe, under Demon Lord Ghirahim and the Demon King Demise. The game also introduces Technoblins and Cursed Bokoblins, undead Bokoblins that can curse Link. In Breath of the Wild and Tears of the Kingdom, Bokoblins are low-level, comical enemies that commonly appear across Hyrule living in camps.
- Chuchus (Note: チュチュ, Chuchu) are jelly-like creatures with squat, translucent bodies, stalk-eyes, and a smiling mouth. They mostly move by bouncing around. Chuchus appear in various colours and some possess specific abilities. Once they are defeated, they will drop jelly, which can be used by Link as an ingredient and for upgrading armour.
- Darknuts (Note: タートナック, Tātonakku) are large armored knights armed with swords and shields. They first appeared in The Legend of Zelda but are recurring foes that appear in Twilight Princess and other games.
- Floormasters (Note: フロアマスター, Furoamasutā) and Wallmasters are ghostly manifestations of giant hands that drag adventurers back to the entrance of a dungeon. Floormasters split up into smaller versions when the original is attacked. Wallmasters first appeared in The Legend of Zelda while Floormasters first appeared in Ocarina of Time. Floormasters also appear in The Wind Waker and The Minish Cap.
- Gibdos (Note: ギブド, Gibudo) are undead creatures wrapped like mummies. They resemble ReDeads in regards to their slow and zombie-like movement; in some games, setting a Gibdo's bandages alight will reveal a Stalfos or a ReDead underneath. They first appeared in The Legend of Zelda.
- Gohma (Note: ゴーマー, Gōmā) are recurring boss monsters which typically resemble giant arthropods with a single eye. The eye serves as their weak point. The original Gohma first appeared in The Legend of Zelda game.
- Guardians (Note: ガーディアン, Gādian) are large mechanical foes that can blast enemies with a powerful laser from their single eye. They appear in Breath of the Wild. Guardian Stalkers roam Hyrule by moving on their mechanical legs, whilst Guardian Skywatchers use propellers for locomotion. Producer Eiji Aonuma said that the design, movement, and relative size compared to Link were based on the Octoroks that appear in the original game.
- Hinox (Note: ヒノックス, Hinokkusu) are a recurring enemy and sub-boss in the Legend of Zelda series. The Hinox's single eye is its most vulnerable place, dealing the most damage to it when hit. They are cyclops-like ogres and have appeared in A Link to the Past, Link's Awakening, Four Swords Adventures, Phantom Hourglass, A Link Between Worlds, Tri Force Heroes, Breath of the Wild, and Tears of the Kingdom. In Breath of the Wild and Tears of the Kingdom, Hinox can be either red, blue or black, depending on their strength. They are the largest monster found within Breath of the Wild, and in Breath of the Wild and Tears of the Kingdom they uproot nearby trees to use as weapons against the player if provoked. Stalnox are skeletal versions of Hinox that appear in Breath of the Wild and Tears of the Kingdom.
- Keese (Note: キース, Kīsu) are bat monsters that often lurk in dark places such as caves, waiting to dive bomb unwary travelers attempting to bite off chunks of flesh. Some Keese have the ability to pick up elements they fly through and there are fire, ice, cursed, and electric variants. They first appeared in The Legend of Zelda.
- Like Likes (Note: ライクライク, Raikuraiku) are yellowish cylindrical monsters that can suck in creatures as large as humans and consume items they carry. They are known for swallowing the shields and tunics that Link uses. Like Likes dissolve into a puddle when killed, leaving the stolen items. They first appeared in The Legend of Zelda.
- Lizalfos (Note: リザルフォス, Rizarufosu) are swift and cunning anthropomorphic lizards that often attack in pairs and can parry and dodge oncoming attacks. They first appeared in Ocarina of Time. In Breath of the Wild, Lizalfos can throw weapons and dash toward their target.
- Lynels (Note: ライネル, Raineru) are large, strong centaur-like creatures with a head of a lion and cattle-like horns that first appeared in The Legend of Zelda. This creature has multiple variations including red, blue, white, and silver, with each color denoting the Lynel's strength. In Breath of the Wild, Lynels are extremely powerful foes that are resistant to attacks.
- Moblins (Note: モリブリン, Moriburin) are orc-like monsters that serve as Ganon's footsoldiers. In The Legend of Zelda and The Adventure of Link, Moblins resembled bulldogs, but are pig-faced in more recent games. They commonly wield spears, swords, bows, or occasionally massive clubs. They are one of the most common enemies in the games and are considered "mighty", but also "dumb". They are described as greedy, self-possessed creatures, and the major antagonist will commonly use them as mercenaries or summoned monsters.
- Octoroks (Note: オクタロック, Okutarokku) are octopus monsters. They are the most frequently-occurring of the Zelda series and appeared in every Legend of Zelda game except for Twilight Princess. Octoroks spit rocks from their mouths. Some species of Octorok are land-dwelling while others are mostly aquatic.
- Poes (Note: ポウ, Pou) are lantern-carrying ghosts formed from concentrated hatred toward the living that freely roam graveyards and other haunted locales. They always carry their signature lanterns. In some editions, they can go invisible when Link is doing a certain action or in a certain form. In Tears of the Kingdom, they appear in the Depths as obtainable items and a currency for Bargainer Statues. They first appeared in A Link to the Past.
- ReDeads (Note: リーデッド, Rīdeddo) are undead creatures resembling zombies with dark brown skin and flat mask-like faces that can paralyze enemies with a scream, and cling to them to drain health away. They first appeared in Ocarina of Time.
- Skulltulas (Note: スタルウォール, Sutaruwōru) (Note: TheGamer repeatedly misspells the enemy "Skulluta" but The Legend of Zelda Encyclopedia and the games very clearly use Skulltula.) are giant spiders with a human skull design on their bodies. They are most commonly found in dark places, such as forests, caves, and dungeons but can also sometimes be found in towns at night. Skulltulas and Big Skulltulas hang from ceiling surfaces, suspended by a strand of silk waiting to drop on unwary prey. Skulltulas, Big Skulltulas, Gold Skulltulas, and Skullwalltulas first appeared in Ocarina of Time.
- Stalfos (Note: スタルフォス, Sutarufosu) are animated skeletons mostly from the remains of dead warriors who still have a strong will to fight, and serve evil powers such as Ganon or Vaati. In Ocarina of Time, by using the Mask of Truth, the player learns from a Gossip Stone that humans that get lost while in the Lost Woods will become Stalfos. They first appeared in The Legend of Zelda.
- Tektites (Note: テクタイト, Tekutaito) are cyclopean four-legged insectoid creatures who use their powerful legs to leap upon and attack prey. They can walk on water and jump up cliffs. They first appeared in The Legend of Zelda.
- Wizzrobes (Note: ウィズローブ, Wizurōbu) are magician-like creatures that wear wizard robes and often use magic. They first appeared in The Legend of Zelda. Elemental Wizzrobes also appear in the series: Fire and Ice Wizzrobes first appeared in Four Swords, and Electric Wizzrobes in Breath of the Wild, which also includes more powerful variants of all three known as Meteo Wizzrobes, Blizzrobes, and Thunder Wizzrobes.

== Reception ==
In their January 2010 issue, Nintendo Power listed the "wonderful worlds" of Hyrule, together with the Mushroom Kingdom from the Super Mario series, Planet Zebes from the Metroid series, the player's town from the Animal Crossing series, and Metro City from the Final Fight series, (Note: The first three Final Fight games were not published or developed by Nintendo, but were released on the Super Nintendo Entertainment System.) as five of their 50 "reasons to love Nintendo". Steve Watts of GameSpot praised the original game world, commenting that although it is minimalist, it, "conveys the feeling of going on a grand adventure through the wilderness, and the lack of hand-holding that would come to define later Zelda games (Note: This article was updated as recently as 2024, by which point Zelda had according to critics and game developers—including Steve Watts in the same article—gone away from hand-holding.) makes the world feel that much more expansive and mysterious". Yannick LeJacq for Kotaku commented in 2014 that "Hyrule is one of the most iconic settings in the history of video games. The Legend of Zelda players have been poring over it in one way or another for almost 30 years now".

Critics celebrated Ocarina of Time's game world's impact on both gamers and the subsequent depictions of 3D game worlds. The open world of Hyrule in Breath of the Wild has received praise for its design. In 2021 Noelle Warner of Destructoid praised its cozy appeal while recovering from the post-quarantine period and felt that she would be happy living in seven out of the nine towns she ranked for coziness. She praised Tarrey Town—which was surrounded by a lake, contained a circle of houses facing one another, and had a view of autumnal trees—the most, but praised the beauty and visuals of many of the other towns. Other critics praised the scale of the open world, its beauty, and its clever sense of navigation.

In 2020, senior editor Caty McCarthy of USgamer ranked the in-game map of A Link to the Past as the best video game map. IGN ranked Hyrule as the sixth greatest game world. In 2021, Evan Narcisse of Kotaku listed Hyrule as one of the richest sci-fi and fantasy worlds in video games.

== Influence and legacy ==
Since the release of the original The Legend of Zelda game, critics have commented on the influence and legacy of The Legend of Zelda universe on the gaming industry. Critics noted the first Zelda game influenced World of Warcraft, (Note: Released in 2004 and receiving regular patch and expansion pack updates since then.) Grand Theft Auto (1997–present), The Elder Scrolls V: Skyrim (2011), Dark Souls (2011–2016), and the entire action RPG genre. The original game was a phenomenal commercial success for Nintendo, selling over 6.5 million copies, and has been described by many critics as one of the greatest video games of all time.

Critics defined Ocarina of Time as foundational to 3D games in the adventure genre, particularly with regard to technical innovations including the "Z-targeting" mechanic, with The Guardian's Keza MacDonald noting a version of the 1998 game's mechanic being used in Red Dead Redemption 2 (2018). Its remapping controls and quick-mapping of buttons (Note: Items being quick-mapped to multiple buttons at once by the player had also appeared in A Link to the Past in 1991 and Link's Awakening in 1993.) was also noted by Tom Power in GamesRadar+ as having crossed into other gaming genres such as the first-person shooter series Halo (2001–present) and Call of Duty (2003–present), as well as Gears of War (2006–present). (Note: Power incorrectly includes this third-person shooter series as part of the first-person shooter genre.) The sense of wonder as a first-time player enters Hyrule Field has been cited as an influence on similar moments in Grand Theft Auto III (2001), Red Dead Redemption 2, Crackdown (2007), and Fallout 3 (2008).

In the months following the release of Breath of the Wild in 2017, many video game developers were influenced by its open world design. Alx Preston, creator of Hyper Light Drifter, remarked that "the sense of freedom and experimentation is incredibly inspiring". Adam Saltsman, creator of Canabalt, commented on the consistency of the game environment and the player's ability to experiment. Vlambeer's Rami Ismail said that "no game has done verticality as well as BotW". Critics and developers cited Breath of the Wild as an influence on the game worlds of Genshin Impact (2020), Immortals Fenyx Rising (2020), Horizon Forbidden West (2022), Death Stranding (2019), and Elden Ring (2022), along with the free-form storytelling of the narrative game Telling Lies (2019). Upon its release, Breath of the Wild achieved critical acclaim and was the biggest commercial success of the franchise and one of the best-selling video games, selling 29 million copies on the Nintendo Switch as of December 2022 and over 1.6 million copies on the Wii U as of July 2022.
