= ReDead =

Monster from The Legend of Zelda series

- The Legend of Zelda race
- ReDead in The Legend of Zelda: Ocarina of Time
- First appearance: The Legend of Zelda: Ocarina of Time (1998)
- Genre: Action-adventure

The ReDead (Japanese: リーデット, Hepburn: Rīdetto) are a species of monster in The Legend of Zelda series. They are zombie-like creatures who are typically stationary until someone draws near, causing them to scream and freezing the person in place while they approach to attack. Variants of the ReDead have appeared in later entries in the series.

ReDeads are considered among the most frightening creatures created by Nintendo, with multiple critics citing its scream and design as contributing to the terror associated with it.

== Concept and design ==
ReDeads, in their debut game The Legend of Zelda: Ocarina of Time, are terracotta-colored zombie-like creatures with hollow eyes who resemble a "gaunt, naked man". They are normally stationary and occasionally make groaning sounds. In some sources or appearances Redeads are described as looking like animated clay figures or have that style to represent this description. When someone comes close enough to a ReDead's line of sight, the ReDead screams and temporarily freezes them as they approach. If they get close enough, they jump on the person's back and begin attacking, requiring the player to remove the ReDead. ReDeads are weak to light, as well as a song called Sun's Song, the latter freezing them in place temporarily. The ReDead in The Legend of Zelda: The Wind Waker differ from the Ocarina of Time and Majora's Mask incarnations, having grey skin, glowing red eyes, and teeth. They are also considered undead creatures in this game.

== Appearances ==
The ReDead originally appeared in The Legend of Zelda: Ocarina of Time as an enemy. They can be encountered by the protagonist Link in a grave; when Link turns into an adult, they are found to have overrun the Hyrule Castle Town, forcing the residents to flee. They also appear in The Legend of Zelda: Majora's Mask, in which the player can cause them to dance and not attack by wearing certain masks. They later appeared in The Legend of Zelda: The Wind Waker. In The Legend of Zelda: Twilight Princess, the monsters which are technically Gibdos, are sometimes dubbed Redead Knights, and behave in a similar manner. Unlike the Redeads from previous entries, the Gibdos in this game will swing their swords instead of jumping onto Link's back. In response to a trailer for The Legend of Zelda: Tears of the Kingdom, an enemy was seen that was believed to be a ReDead. On release, it was discovered that this enemy was actually a different enemy called a Gibdo. In The Legend of Zelda: Echoes of Wisdom. The ReDeads appear as enemies, though protagonist Princess Zelda, who has the ability to create copies of enemies, can also summon ReDeads to fight as her ally, who are able to scream to paralyze her nearby enemies.

The ReDead appear outside of The Legend of Zelda series in Super Smash Bros. Melee. It can appear as an obstacle for players, and also has a collectible trophy included.

== Critical reception ==
The ReDead have received generally positive reception, considered among the scariest enemies in video games. Game Revolution writer Nicholas Tan considered it among the scariest video game monsters, believing that their Ocarina of Time incarnation was the scariest version. They cited a variety of factors, including their "strange wooden-coffin faces, their hollow eyes, their tightly-wound teeth, or their polygonal mess of a body" as examples of what they found so scary, as well as the way they attack the player. NintendoLife's Alana Hagues thought that the ReDead was the scariest enemy in the series, calling it "one of the most horrifying fictional creatures I've ever laid my eyes on". She remarked that, despite it not appearing often, it was the first thing she thought of when she thought of enemies in the series, stating that the loss of control when attacked by it was terrifying. She noted that, despite finding the graveyard encounter terrifying, she associated the enemy with Hyrule Castle Town Market, stating that the market being destroyed and overrun by ReDead made her feel like a failure due to being unable to prevent that. She also remarked that she felt sympathetic at the idea that ReDeads would surround the corpse of a fallen ReDead, believing that this is them mourning, stating that it is the only act they can do besides "mindless pursuit and soul-sucking." Commenting on later incarnations, she felt that the ReDeads dancing in Majora's Mask fit in well with the game's "weird, unsettling tone", and that The Wind Waker's incarnations were a "different kind of horrifying" due to its addition of teeth. A writer for the website Magmix found the sight of ReDeads paralyzing Link and grasping onto him traumatic, stating that it was full of horror elements, such as its hollow eyes and its attack.

Dread Central writer Joel Couture found the ReDead to be terrifying, stating that they were made more excited to play The Legend of Zelda: Skyward Sword due to it being absent from the game. Couture felt that the ReDead stood above other "spooky" enemies in The Legend of Zelda, calling it the series' most terrifying enemy. He stated that the moans of the ReDead were unlike any monster noises in the series, calling them "oddly human" and out of place. His first time seeing it was unsettling for him, noting how it just standing there was so unlike how enemies worked in the series, and added that the first time it screamed at him "scarred [him] on some level" due to how unexpected it was. He also found the attack unsettling, calling it "strangely intimate" due to how it's wrapped around Link, and said that it made his panic worse. Couture stated that this felt like what it would feel like to be a victim in a horror movie. Ben Davis of Destructoid felt that the ReDead were among the creepiest enemies in the series alongside Dead Hand, stating that the ReDead's scream "sends shivers down their spine" and noting how frightening their appearance was. Conversely, he remarked that the ReDeads in Majora's Mask were the most humorous part of the game, stating how shocking it was to see such a frightening monster be so "carefree and jubilant" while they dance.

Nintendo World Report writer Phillip Stortzum remarked how frightening and surprising the ReDead was, stating that his attempts to brute force defeat the ReDead were thwarted. Kotaku writer Luke Plunkett believed that Nintendo had made the scariest enemy in any video game with the ReDead, stating that it stood out among character designs by the company that are kid-friendly. He felt that the design and attack method are not particularly frightening, but the scream, which he described as an "indescribable, inhuman shriek", is what made it so scary. He felt that the freezing effect Link experiences mirrored being frozen in fear as a player. He also believed that efforts were made to make them less frightening in future games, such as their dancing in Majora's Mask and "comical appearance" in The Wind Waker, though he still found the latter frightening due to the scream and the addition of glowing red eyes. He considered it a testament to Nintendo's quality as a game developer that ReDeads continued to be scary. TheGamer writer Andrea Shearon hoped that they would re-appear in the then-upcoming Breath of the Wild sequel.
