= The Legend of Zelda: Majora's Mask =

2000 video game

- North American box art featuring the titular Majora's mask
- Developer: Nintendo EAD
- Publisher: Nintendo
- Directors: Eiji Aonuma; Yoshiaki Koizumi
- Producer: Shigeru Miyamoto
- Programmers: Toshio Iwawaki; Toshihiko Nakago
- Artists: Yusuke Nakano; Takaya Imamura
- Writers: Mitsuhiro Takano; Eiji Aonuma; Yoshiaki Koizumi
- Composer: Koji Kondo
- Series: The Legend of Zelda
- Platforms: Nintendo 64; GameCube
- Release: Nintendo 64; JP: April 27, 2000; NA: October 26, 2000; PAL: November 17, 2000; GameCube; JP: November 7, 2003; NA: November 17, 2003; PAL: March 19, 2004
- Genre: Action-adventure
- Mode: Single-player

The Legend of Zelda: Majora's Mask (Note: Japanese: ゼルダの伝説 ムジュラの仮面, Hepburn: Zeruda no Densetsu: Mujura no Kamen) is a 2000 action-adventure game developed and published by Nintendo for the Nintendo 64. It is the second game in The Legend of Zelda series to use 3D graphics, following Ocarina of Time (1998). Designed by a creative team led by Eiji Aonuma, Yoshiaki Koizumi, and Shigeru Miyamoto, Majora's Mask was completed in less than two years. It features enhanced graphics and several gameplay changes, but reuses elements and character models from Ocarina of Time, a creative decision made necessary by time constraints.

A few months after Ocarina of Time, the character Link arrives in a parallel world, Termina, and becomes embroiled in a quest to prevent the moon from crashing in three days' time. The game introduces gameplay concepts revolving around a perpetually repeating three-day cycle and the use of various masks that transform Link into different forms. As the player progresses, Link learns to play numerous melodies on his ocarina, which allow him to control the flow of time, open hidden passages, or manipulate the environment. As with other Zelda games, players must navigate through several dungeons that contain complex puzzles and enemies. Majora's Mask requires the Expansion Pak add-on for the Nintendo 64, primarily to support the game’s complex mechanics, such as the repeating three-day cycle and extensive mask system. It also allows for graphical enhancements and more on-screen characters.

A critical and commercial success, Majora's Mask is considered to be one of the greatest video games of all time. Some critics deemed it to be on par or superior to Ocarina of Time in certain aspects, praising its innovative gameplay, intricate design, robust control scheme, and atmospheric soundtrack, though it received minor criticisms for graphical limitations, and was considered less groundbreaking than its predecessor. It generated a cult following, with retrospective analyses highlighting its dark narrative tone and emotional depth. It was re-released as part of The Legend of Zelda: Collector's Edition for the GameCube in 2003, the Virtual Console service for the Wii and Wii U, and the Nintendo Classics service for Nintendo Switch and Nintendo Switch 2. An enhanced remake developed by Grezzo for the Nintendo 3DS, The Legend of Zelda: Majora's Mask 3D, was released in 2015.

== Gameplay ==
The Legend of Zelda: Majora's Mask is an action-adventure game set in a three-dimensional (3D) environment. Players control the on-screen character, Link, from a third-person perspective to explore dungeons, solve puzzles, and fight monsters. Players may direct Link to perform basic actions such as walking, running, and context-based jumping using the analog stick, and must use items to navigate the environment. In addition to wielding a sword, Link can block or reflect attacks with a shield, stun enemies by throwing Deku Nuts, attack from a distance with a bow and arrow, and use bombs to destroy obstacles and damage enemies. He can also latch onto objects or paralyze enemies with the Hookshot. These actions are aided by the "Z-targeting" system introduced in Ocarina of Time, wherein the player may lock the camera onto a particular character, object, or enemy and maintain it in view regardless of Link's motion through the environment. Similar to other games in the series, Link must progress through a variety of dungeons, which include numerous puzzles that the player must solve. Dungeons also contain optional puzzles that award collectible fairies, which grant Link additional abilities when all are gathered. As the sequel to Ocarina of Time, the first 3D game in the series, Majora's Mask retains its predecessor's gameplay systems and control scheme while introducing elements including character transformations and a three-day cycle.

=== Masks and transformations ===
Link in his Goron form. The clock at the bottom of the screen indicates the time within the three-day cycle, which is currently 10 am on the first day.

Whereas the masks in Ocarina of Time are limited to an optional sidequest, they play a central role in Majora's Mask, which has 24 masks in total. Using the three primary masks, the player can transform Link into different creatures: a Deku Scrub, a Goron, and a Zora. Each form features unique abilities: Deku Link can perform a spin attack, shoot bubbles, skip on water, and fly for a short time by launching from Deku Flowers; Goron Link can roll at high speeds, punch with deadly force, pound the ground with his massive, rock-like body, and walk in lava without taking damage; Zora Link can swim faster, throw boomerang-like fins from his arms, generate an electric force field, and walk on the bottoms of bodies of water. Some areas can only be accessed by use of these abilities. Link and his three transformations receive different reactions from other characters which is key to solving certain puzzles. For instance, Goron and Zora Link can exit Clock Town at will, but town guards do not permit Deku Link to leave due to his childlike appearance.

Other masks provide situational benefits without transforming Link. For example, the Great Fairy's Mask helps locate stray fairies in the four temples, the Bunny Hood increases Link's movement speed, and the Stone Mask renders Link invisible to most enemies. Certain masks are involved only in sidequests or specialized situations. Examples include the Postman's Hat, which grants Link access to items in mailboxes, and Kafei's Mask, which initiates a long sidequest to locate a missing person.

=== Three-day cycle ===
Majora's Mask revolves around a 72-hour cycle (lasting about 54 minutes in real time), in which non-player characters and events follow a predictable schedule. An on-screen clock tracks the day and time. Players may save their game and return to 6:00 am of the first day by playing the Song of Time. Players must use knowledge accumulated from previous cycles to solve puzzles, complete quests, and unlock dungeons related to the main story. Although returning to the first day resets most quests and character interactions, Link retains weapons, equipment, masks, learned songs, and proof of dungeon completion. Link may slow down time by playing the Inverted Song of Time, or skip to the next morning or evening using the Song of Double Time. Owl statues scattered across major areas of the world allow players to temporarily save their progress after activation and also provide warp points to quickly navigate the world using the Song of Soaring.

During the three-day cycle, Link tracks characters' fixed schedules using the Bombers' Notebook. The notebook lists 20 characters in need of aid, such as a soldier who needs medicine and an affianced couple estranged by Skull Kid's mischief. Blue bars on the notebook's timeline indicate when characters are available for interaction, and icons indicate that Link has received items, such as masks, from the characters.

== Plot ==
=== Setting and characters ===
Majora's Mask is set in Termina, an alternate version of Hyrule (the main setting of most Zelda games). Termina is depicted as a darker, more unsettling version of Hyrule, in which landmarks are familiar but twisted and minor characters who previously appeared in Ocarina of Time are presented with individual stories of misfortune. In the skies above Termina, a grimacing moon moves inexorably closer, threatening to crash and obliterate all life. It is predicted to impact at dawn on the day of the Carnival of Time, an annual harvest festival that begins in three days. Despite the looming threat, the various peoples of Termina are preoccupied by their own respective troubles. In the center of Termina, the people of Clock Town endlessly debate evacuating the city or continuing to prepare for the festival, the failure of which would be devastating to the economy.

=== Story ===
Majora's Mask begins several months after Ocarina of Time. It is the first game in the Child Era of the "Victorious Hero" timeline that connects to an alternate reality scenario where the Hero of Time successfully defeats Ganondorf in Ocarina of Time and returns to his childhood to use the wisdom he has gained to warn young Zelda of the horrifying fate of Hyrule.

Link sets out in search of his missing companion, Navi, who departed after the events of the previous game. During his search, he is ambushed by a Skull Kid wearing a mysterious mask and his two fairy companions, the siblings Tatl and Tael. They steal both his horse, Epona, and the Ocarina of Time. Link pursues them and falls into a trap; Skull Kid curses Link, transforming him into a Deku Scrub, but inadvertently leaves Tatl behind. With no other choice, Tatl guides Link to Clock Town to reunite with her brother. They meet the Happy Mask Salesman, who pressures Link into recovering the mask that Skull Kid stole, promising to break the curse if he succeeds. After three days, Link manages to locate Skull Kid and retrieve the Ocarina of Time but fails to get the mask. As the moon nears impact, Tael instructs Link to awaken the Four Giants, the guardian deities of the regions in each cardinal direction. Link plays the Song of Time and miraculously returns to the day he first set foot in Termina.

Mistakenly believing that Link recovered the mask, the Happy Mask Salesman breaks Link's curse by playing the Song of Healing. He soon discovers that Link failed and flies into a rage. He explains that Skull Kid's mask is Majora's Mask, which contains a powerful evil that can bring about the end of the world. After he collects himself, the salesman dispatches Link to retrieve the mask once more. Link embarks on his quest by going to the four regions that Tael mentioned where he finds that they are afflicted by Majora's magic. In Woodfall, the swamp is poisoned and the Deku princess was kidnapped. Snowhead has been suffering an eternal winter, driving the Gorons to starvation. Great Bay's waters have been contaminated, turning its creatures into monsters. In Ikana Canyon, inhabitants are terrorized by a plague that brings the dead back to life. Along his journey he finds Epona and they reunite. Through his travels, Link learns that Skull Kid cursed the land as revenge for feeling abandoned by his Giant friends when they became Termina's guardians. Tatl and Tael befriended the lonely Skull Kid and accompanied him in the mischief that led to his theft of the mask, which has been corrupting him ever since. Under the mask's influence, Skull Kid forced the moon on a collision course with Termina.

Across numerous time loops, Link liberates the Giants and summons them on the eve of the Carnival. They manage to halt the moon's descent but Majora's Mask comes alive and possesses the moon itself, abandoning Skull Kid. Link confronts Majora's Mask inside the moon and defeats it. Link, the fairies, and the Giants all make amends with Skull Kid, while the Happy Mask Salesman recovers the now powerless Majora's Mask. As Link departs Termina riding on Epona, the Carnival of Time begins with celebrations based on Link's accomplishments. In a nearby forest, Skull Kid draws himself with Link and his friends on a tree stump.

== Development ==
Whereas Ocarina of Time needed five years since the previous entry in the series, Link's Awakening, Majora's Mask was released on a much shorter timetable. It was developed by a team led by Eiji Aonuma, Yoshiaki Koizumi, and Shigeru Miyamoto, with Miyamoto primarily in a supervisory role. It was initially conceived as a remixed "Ura" edition of Ocarina of Time for the disc-based 64DD peripheral for Nintendo 64. Aonuma, who had been in charge of dungeons for Ocarina of Time, was unenthused about simply redesigning them for Ura Zelda, so Miyamoto challenged his team to create a new game using the existing game engine and graphics in just one year. The more limited team finished Majora's Mask in 15 months by reusing game assets. The aggressive development schedule resulted in a great deal of 'crunch'—mandatory overtime—and the writers expressed frustration by inserting complaints about overwork into the script. Another team finished Ura Zelda, but it never came out on the 64DD, which was a commercial failure and not released outside Japan. In 2002, it was retitled Ocarina of Time: Master Quest and packaged with pre-ordered copies of The Legend of Zelda: The Wind Waker for GameCube.

According to Aonuma, the development team grappled with what kind of game would follow after Ocarina of Time's success. Aonuma recruited Koizumi, who was designing a repeatable "cops-and-robbers" game that would allow players to have a different experience each time they played it. Together, they adapted Koizumi's game into the three-day system to "make the game data more compact while still providing deep gameplay". Early in development, this system originally rewound a week, but it was shortened as seven days was deemed too burdensome for players to remember and too complex to create in one year. Aonuma cited the 1998 film Run Lola Run as inspiration for the time loop concept. Miyamoto and Koizumi came up with the story that served as the basis for the script written by Mitsuhiro Takano. Koizumi said the idea of the moon falling came from one of his dreams. Art director Takaya Imamura said that "Majora" was a portmanteau of his surname and "jura" from one of his favorite films, Jurassic Park. Reflecting on the mature and melancholy tone, Aonuma felt that players of Ocarina of Time had grown up somewhat and could be motivated by emotions like sadness and regret. The game's signature sidequest, the Anju and Kafei wedding quest, was intended to highlight the contrast between a joyous occasion and the impending cataclysm. In addition to saving time, reusing character models from Ocarina of Time allowed the team to recontextualize them in a more somber setting. Yoshiaki Koizumi stated that in contrast to medieval Europe, which inspired Ocarina of Time's Hyrule, Majora's Mask's Termina took inspiration from Southeast Asia. The game was originally intended to include support for the Voice Recognition Unit accessory, but this feature was removed prior to release.

Majora's Mask first appeared in the media in May 1999, when Famitsu reported that a long-planned Zelda expansion for the 64DD was in development. It had a playable demo at the Nintendo Space World exhibition on August 27, 1999. The Space World demo included many elements from the final game, including the large clock that dominates Clock Town's center, the timer at the bottom of the screen, and mask transformations. In November, Nintendo announced a "Holiday 2000" release date. The final title was announced in March 2000. An $8 million marketing campaign supported the game in America. Majora's Mask was released on April 27, 2000, in Japan and on October 26, 2000, in North America, on a gold Nintendo 64 cartridge.

=== Technical differences from Ocarina of Time ===
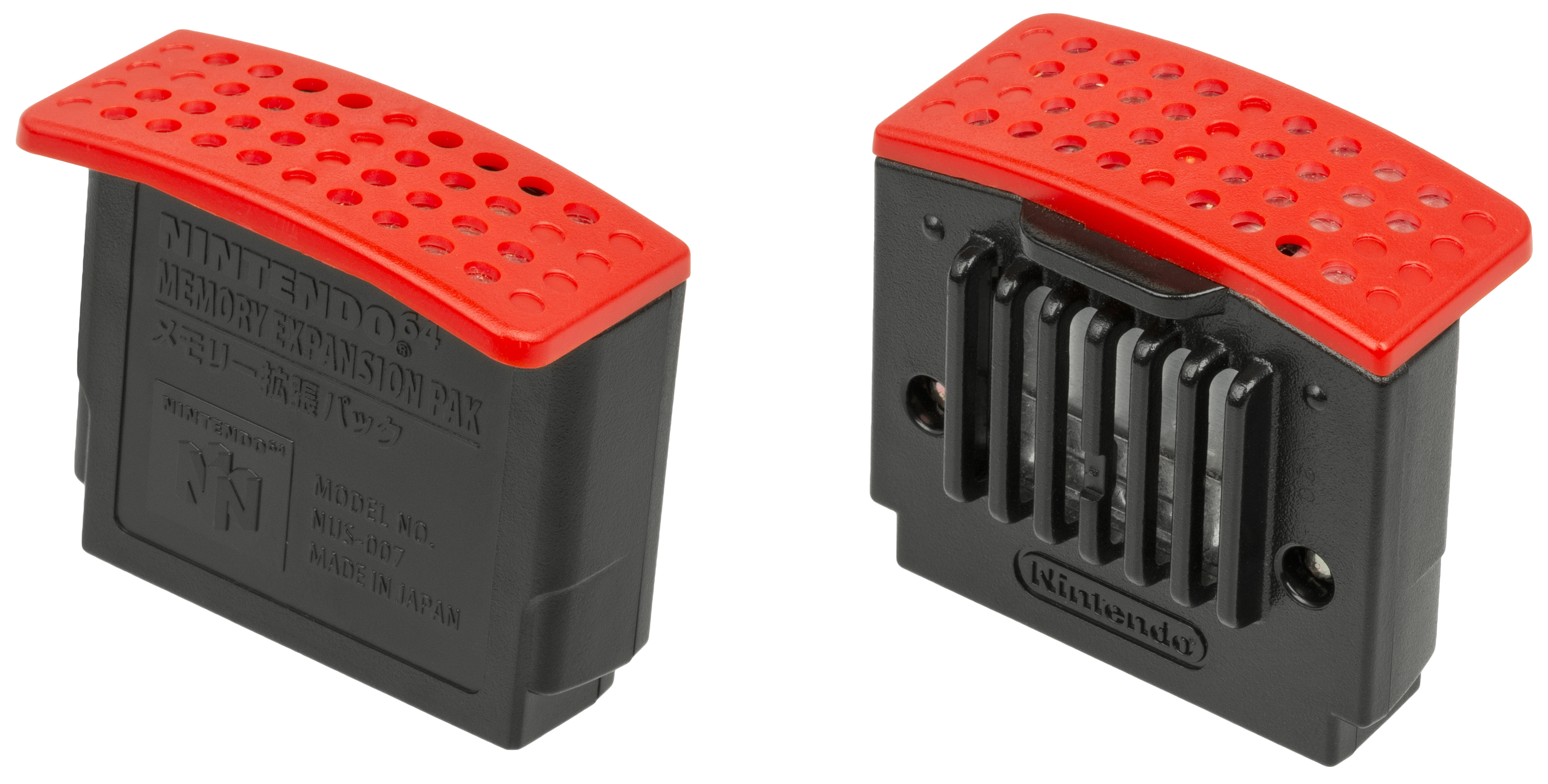
The 4MB Expansion Pak is required to run Majora's Mask on the Nintendo 64 console.

Majora's Mask runs on an upgraded version of the engine used in Ocarina of Time and requires the use of the Nintendo 64's 4MB Expansion Pak, making it and Donkey Kong 64 the only two games that require the peripheral. IGN theorized this requirement is due to Majora's Mask's origins as a Nintendo 64DD game, which would necessitate an extra 4MB of RAM. The Expansion Pak allows for greater draw distances, more accurate dynamic lighting, more detailed texture mapping and animation, complex framebuffer effects such as motion blur, and more characters displayed on-screen. The expanded draw distance allows the player to see much farther, eliminating the need for the fog effect and "cardboard panorama" seen in Ocarina of Time, which were used to obscure distant areas. IGN considered the texture design one of the best created for the Nintendo 64, saying that although some textures have a low resolution, they are "colorful and diverse," giving each area "its own unique look."

=== Music ===
Longtime series composer Koji Kondo wrote the music with contributions from Toru Minegishi. The soundtrack primarily consists of reworked music from Ocarina of Time, complemented with traditional Zelda music such as the "Overworld Theme" and new material. Kondo described the music as having "an exotic Chinese opera sound." As the three-day cycle progresses, the theme song of Clock Town changes between three variations, one for each day. IGN related the shift in music to a change in the game's atmosphere, saying that the quickened tempo of the Clock Town music on the second day conveys a sense of time passing quickly. The two-disc soundtrack was released in Japan on June 23, 2000, and features 112 tracks.

== Reception ==
Reception

Aggregate score
Aggregator	Score
Metacritic	95/100 (Note: Based on 27 reviews)

Review scores
Publication	Score
Edge	9/10
Electronic Gaming Monthly	10/10
EP Daily	90%
Famitsu	9/10, 9/10, 9/10, 10/10
Game Informer	9.75/10
GameFan	98/100
GamePro	4.5/5
GameRevolution	A−
GameSpot	8.3/10
GamesRadar+	4/4
IGN	9.9/10
Next Generation	4/5
Nintendo Power	9.4/10
St. Petersburg Times	A+

Awards
Publication	Award
Academy of Interactive Arts & Sciences	Console Action/Adventure (2001)
Academy of Interactive Arts & Sciences	Game Design (2001)

In Japan, The Legend of Zelda: Majora's Mask sold 601,542 copies by the end of 2000. In the United States, it was the fourth best-selling game of 2000 at 1,206,489 copies. In Europe, it was the eighth highest-grossing game of 2000. Overall, 3.36 million copies were sold worldwide for Nintendo 64.

Majora's Mask received critical acclaim. It holds a score of 95/100 on review aggregator website Metacritic, indicating "universal acclaim", based on 27 reviews. Most critics saw Majora's Mask as equal to or better than Ocarina of Time in certain respects, including Chip and Jonathan Carter of the St. Petersburg Times, who previously called Ocarina of Time "the Gone With the Wind of video gaming". (Note: Supported by multiple references.) While Shigeru Miyamoto was celebrated as a creative genius, critics noted that Majora's Mask was primarily directed by Eiji Aonuma, showcasing Nintendo's broader talent pool. The game was seen as a testament to Nintendo's ability to innovate within an established franchise, even without Miyamoto's direct involvement.

Critics universally praised the three-day time cycle as a bold and innovative mechanic, often compared to the film Groundhog Day. This system, where players relive the same three days using the Ocarina of Time to reset progress and manipulate the flow of time, was said to add urgency and depth to the gameplay. The Bomber's Notebook, which tracks NPC schedules and side quests, was lauded for enhancing the non-linear experience and encouraging players to engage with Termina's inhabitants. The introduction of 24 masks, particularly the three transformation masks, was a standout feature. Critics highlighted the different forms and their abilities as a fresh twist that diversified the gameplay. However, Jeff Gerstmann of GameSpot and Victor Lucas of The Electric Playground were frustrated by the game's time-sensitive nature and heavier focus on side quests; Lucas initially found the repetition so aggravating that he nearly abandoned the game, though he later appreciated its depth once he overcame the learning curve.

Termina was described as a meticulously crafted world, smaller than Hyrule but denser with content due to its numerous side quests and interactive NPCs. Edge and Jes Bickham of GamesRadar emphasized the focus on the lives of Clock Town's residents; Edge described the intertwining of different characters' quests as a "remarkable achievement", and Bickham pointed out that their reactions to their impending doom contributed to a darker narrative tone. Bickham and IGN's Fran Mirabella highlighted the variety of environments and the dynamic changes triggered by completing dungeons, which add replayability and depth.

The game's technical aspects were received positively, but were considered less groundbreaking than Ocarina of Time. Edge, Bickham, and IGN's Matt Casamassina appreciated the retention of its predecessor's control scheme, though Casamassina argued the sequel builds on these mechanics without introducing equally revolutionary features, noting that this familiarity is why the game scored slightly lower than Ocarina. Critics highlighted the visual enhancements provided by the Expansion Pak, including greater draw distances, more detailed textures, and the ability to render more characters on-screen. Bickham and GameRevolution's Johnny Liu considered the game one of the best-looking N64 titles, and "The Freshman" of GamePro was impressed by such details as the menacing moon visible from a boat tour in a swamp. Despite the graphical improvements, Mirabella, Casamassina, and Electronic Gaming Monthly's Greg Sewart noted occasional framerate drops (especially in crowded scenes or certain dungeons) and blurry textures, reflecting the N64's aging hardware. Liu, despite his praise of the graphics, compared them unfavorably to newer consoles like the Dreamcast and PlayStation 2, suggesting the game would have benefited from more powerful hardware.

The soundtrack was praised for its atmospheric quality, with dynamic changes reflecting the passage of time and environmental shifts, though Mirabella noted the MIDI quality typical of N64 games. Mirabella and Liu enjoyed the return of the iconic Overworld theme, but Liu deemed the new soundtrack additions less effective, and he and The Freshman were critical of the absence of voice acting.

Majora's Mask was a runner-up for GameSpot's "Best Nintendo 64 Game" award, losing to Perfect Dark. It was also nominated for "Best Adventure Game" among console games. During the 4th Annual Interactive Achievement Awards, Majora's Mask was honored with the "Console Action/Adventure" and "Game Design" awards; it also received nominations for "Console Game of the Year" and "Game of the Year".

== Legacy ==
Majora's Mask makes consistent appearances on lists of the best games in the Zelda series, (Note: Supported by multiple references.) as well as the greatest games of all time. (Note: Supported by multiple references.) It has also placed highly in fan-voted polls. Critics have compared it favorably to its closest contemporary, Ocarina of Time. Writing for Polygon, Danielle Riendeau observed that Ocarina of Time provided the foundations for Majora's Mask to become the "most innovative" game in the series on a structural level. She commended the way it shifted the focus away from the "chosen hero" narrative common in the series to the myriad people that Link meets on his adventure, most of whom were given more compelling characterization than in Ocarina of Time. Tomas Franzese of Digital Trends saw Majora's Mask as the template for the way Tears of the Kingdom later retrofitted new mechanics onto the world of Breath of the Wild. Marty Sliva of The Escapist placed it in conversation with Zelda II: The Adventure of Link in the way it challenged series conventions.

Retrospective analyses recognize the mature themes and complex time loop gameplay. Yahtzee Croshaw of The Escapist opined that its progress-resetting mechanics defied prevailing game design trends that prioritized player empowerment and a game of its type was unlikely to be repeated due to the conservatism of big-budget game development. Sliva identified the short development cycle and reuse of assets as a limitation that sparked the design team's creativity. Jonathan Holmes of Destructoid called Majora's Mask a game about "being a young adult", with all the responsibility and confusion that entails. He saw Link as an adult in a child's body who must step up when the other adults fail to do so in the face of crisis. The existential horror of the falling moon is another common topic of analysis, providing both pathos and a prism to understand the themes of loneliness and forgiveness. Nikole Robinson of GamesRadar+ described Majora's Mask as a uniquely stressful yet captivating game, where the relentless three-day time cycle and impending moon crash create a pervasive sense of futility and existential dread, forcing players to confront the unstoppable passage of time and the limitations of heroism. She said that the game's haunting atmosphere, emotionally rich sidequests, and transformative masks weaved a dark narrative of loss and despair, challenging players to save a doomed Termina while grappling with the personal stories and unresolvable mysteries that linger long after playing. Majora's Mask has been cited as a thematic and mechanical inspiration for games such as Kena: Bridge of Spirits, Outer Wilds, and Elsinore, among others. Author and literary critic Gabe Durham of Boss Fight Books has also observed the influence on films like Source Code and Edge of Tomorrow.

=== Ports and emulated releases ===
In 2003, Nintendo re-released Majora's Mask on the GameCube as part of The Legend of Zelda: Collector's Edition, a special promotional disc which also contained three other The Legend of Zelda games and a 20-minute demo of The Legend of Zelda: The Wind Waker. This disc came bundled with a GameCube console, as part of a subscription offer to Nintendo Power magazine, or through Nintendo's official website. The Collector's Edition was also available through the Club Nintendo reward program. A bonus discount was offered in 2004 with the purchase of The Legend of Zelda: Four Swords Adventures during the month-long "Zelda Collection" campaign.

Similar to other GameCube re-releases, versions featured in the Collector's Edition are emulations of the originals using GameCube hardware. The only differences are minor adjustments to button icons to resemble the buttons on the GameCube controller. Majora's Mask also boots with a disclaimer that some of the original sounds may cause problems due to their emulation. Aside from these deliberate changes, GameSpot's Ricardo Torres found that the frame rate "appears choppier" and noted inconsistent audio. The GameCube version also features a slightly higher native resolution than its Nintendo 64 counterpart, as well as progressive scan.

Majora's Mask was released on the Wii's Virtual Console service in Europe and Australia on April 3, 2009, and Japan on April 7. It was later released in North America on May 18 and commemorated as the 300th Virtual Console game available for purchase in the region. During January 2012, Club Nintendo members could download Majora's Mask onto the Wii Console at a discount. A similar deal was offered at the discontinuation of Club Nintendo in 2015. The game was released for the Wii U's Virtual Console service in Europe on June 23, 2016 and in North America on November 24. Majora's Mask was released through the Nintendo Classics service on February 25, 2022.

=== Nintendo 3DS remake ===
After the release of The Legend of Zelda: Ocarina of Time 3D, a remake for the Nintendo 3DS, director Eiji Aonuma suggested that a Majora's Mask remake was dependent on interest and demand. Following this news, a fan campaign called "Operation Moonfall" was launched to demonstrate that demand. The campaign name is a reference to a similar fan-based movement, Operation Rainfall, set up to persuade Nintendo of America to localize a trio of role-playing games for the Wii. The petition reached 16,000 signatures after a week. Nintendo of America president Reggie Fils-Aimé acknowledged the campaign but said that the ultimate decision would be based on financial projections rather than a fan petition. Both Zelda producer Eiji Aonuma and Miyamoto expressed interest in developing the remake.

The remake, titled The Legend of Zelda: Majora's Mask 3D, was released worldwide in February 2015. Like Ocarina of Time 3D before it, the remake features improved character models and stereoscopic 3D graphics, along with altered boss battles, an additional fishing minigame, and compatibility with the New Nintendo 3DS, particularly its second analog stick used for camera control alongside the pre-existing Circle Pad Pro. To update the game for modern audiences, Aonuma and the team at Grezzo compiled a list of gameplay moments that stuck out to them as unreasonable for players, colloquially dubbed the "what in the world" list. The release coincided with the launch of the New Nintendo 3DS system in North America and Europe. A special edition New Nintendo 3DS XL model was launched alongside the game, with the European release featuring a pin badge, double-sided poster, and steelbook case. The UK retailer Game offered a Majora's Mask-themed paperweight as a pre-order bonus for the standard edition.

=== Cultural impact ===
Majora's Mask was the primary inspiration for the 2010s web serial Ben Drowned by Alexander D. Hall, which helped define the creepypasta genre of online storytelling. Building on the horror elements of the game, Ben Drowned is framed as an urban legend about a "haunted" Majora's Mask game cartridge that causes unexplainable events in-game and in the player's real life. Eric Van Allen of Kotaku compared it to a campfire story adapted for the digital age. Victor Luckerson of The Ringer attributed part of Majora's Mask's enduring cult following to its ambiguous themes, malleable and receptive to reinterpretations like Ben Drowned. Sliva considered Ben Drowned an inextricable part of the game's wider legacy.

Features based on Majora's Mask have also appeared in the Super Smash Bros. series. A stage based on the Great Bay appears in Super Smash Bros. Melee and Super Smash Bros. Ultimate. Skull Kid appears as a computer-controlled Assist Trophy in Super Smash Bros. for Nintendo 3DS and Wii U and Ultimate, while the Moon appears as an Assist Trophy in Ultimate as well. A Skull Kid-themed mask is available as customizable headgear to be worn by Mii characters in Nintendo 3DS and Wii U and Ultimate.

American company Ember Lab made an animated short film based on the game's premise called Terrible Fate in 2016. The film propelled the studio to stardom for its exemplary animation quality, leading to them developing the similarly acclaimed Kena: Bridge of Spirits.
