= Song of Healing =

Video game music track by Koji Kondo

- The Happy Mask Salesman playing the "Song of Healing" for Link in The Legend of Zelda: Majora's Mask (2000)

Composition by Koji Kondo

from the album The Legend of Zelda: Majora's Mask Official Soundtrack
- Released: 2000
- Length: 1:23 (full version); 0:08 (ocarina version)
- Label: Pioneer LDC

The "Song of Healing" is a composition created by Koji Kondo for the 2000 action-adventure game The Legend of Zelda: Majora's Mask, developed and published by Nintendo. The song's composition consists of a simple piano medley backed up by an ambient synth, with the main notes being B, A, and F. It is played multiple times throughout the game, and is a song that the player character, Link, can play on his ocarina to turn the souls of in-game characters into masks.

The track exhibits themes of grief and healing, and is played in multiple of the game's emotional cutscenes. Renditions of the main medley appear in several other songs throughout the game's soundtrack. The song has been met with a positive response from video game critics and journalists, many of which have praised its simplistic medley and relaxing nature.

== Composition and appearances ==
Composer Koji Kondo in 2006

The "Song of Healing" was composed by Koji Kondo for The Legend of Zelda: Majora's Mask (2000). It features a simple composition of a piano medley backed up by an ambient synth in the background. It is played in the 3/4 time signature all the way through, and in a B–F tritone. The main piano medley consists of the notes B, A, and F played twice. The song's notes is an inversion of "Saria's Song" from The Legend of Zelda: Ocarina of Time (1998), which is an upbeat, jaunty song in comparison to the "Song of Healing".

Within Majora's Mask, the song is one that the player character, Link, can learn and play for other characters, and it has the ability to "heal" and transform the souls of others into masks. In-game, the Happy Mask Salesman describes it to Link as "a melody that heals evil magic and troubled spirits, turning them into masks". The first use of the song in the game is when the Salesman plays the song for Link to revert him back to his normal form after he had been transformed into a Deku Scrub, a plant-like creature. A full version of the song also plays during certain scenes, particularly emotional ones. Renditions of the song's medley also appear in other songs throughout the game. James Bentley of Eurogamer labelled the song as similar to that of folk music.

The soundtrack to Majora's Mask was released physically in Japan in 2000 through Pioneer LDC, and in the United States in 2013. The physical soundtrack features both the full version of the "Song of Healing", which is 1 minute and 23 seconds long, and the ocarina rendition, which is only eight seconds long.

== Analysis and themes ==
The "Song of Healing" exhibits themes of grief and healing. Commenting on the song's composition, Kate Gray of Nintendo Life said that the notes of the song exhibit dissonance, and that it uses tritones to evoke tension and unease. She further wrote that, while dissonance is "unpleasant to the ear, and requires resolution—a return to the original key—to put the listener at ease again", the "Song of Healing" still leaves the listener unsatisfied through its usage of the minor key, likening it to how "nothing can soothe us when we are grieving". In a separate article, Gray wrote that the song was about how healing is not trying to heal pain, but finding the strength to move on, declaring that "change is heartbreaking, but necessary".

According to Jeremy W. Smith, writing for the Journal of Sound and Music in Games, the song demonstrates change from sadness to hope as it progresses, focusing on its changing modes and tones. He interpreted the song as going from "incomplete" chords in the beginning, communicating a "sense of emptiness or loneliness", to slowly incorporating more melodic ascents until the "enduring sadness" is "healed" with hope in the next parts of the piece, just as the song heals characters' souls by easing their grief and regrets in the game". Both Gray and Lotte Reinbold of The Guardian highlighted the song's composition as an inversion of "Saria's Song"; Gray deemed it an example of how Majora's Mask turns something familiar and comforting to the player into something "unfamiliar, distressing, and foreign", while Reinbold said that it was an "aural reminder that Link has found himself somewhere very different to Hyrule, somewhere that things aren't quite right".

== Reception and legacy ==
James Bentley of Eurogamer described the "Song of Healing" as the saddest song in the Zelda series. He wrote that "despite its dark tone and atmosphere, there's something relaxing at the core of this song". He wrote that the loneliness exhibited by the song is "contrasted by the millions of people who have been touched by it. Though it is titled after healing, its sadness is representative of the contrasts we need in life. Our happiness is often symbolic of the absence of sadness." He further wrote that the "Song of Healing", was a "painful realisation of my own sadness and the joy that must come from it". He also viewed it as an example of the clash in tone between Majora's Mask's predecessor, Ocarina of Time. He believed that with Majora's Mask being far more "dark" than Ocarina of Time, the "Song of Healing" "plays into the narrative well".

Peter Tieryas and Narelle Ho Sang, writing for Kotaku, wrote that the "Song of Healing" was one that helped them relax during stressful life moments in 2020, stating that when they listened to it "memories from the tragedies the characters suffered in the game came to me". Ben Davis of Destructoid described it as a "beautiful, calming melody" that he would often stay in certain areas for long periods of time specifically to keep listening to, and also labelled it as the best song in Majora's Mask. In a retrospective of Majora's Mask, Reinbold wrote that was integral to some of the game's most emotionally impactful moments. The Escapist listed it as one of the best songs from the Zelda series.

Multiple fan iterations of the song have been created, using their own interpreations of the song's meaning and tones, according to Smith. Bently wrote that the impact and popularity of the song went beyond that of Majora's Mask, describing it as an ambassador of the game its from and "almost a cultural phenomenon in itself". According to Matt Bradford of GamesRadar+, the "Song of Healing" is the most iconic and recognizable song to come from Majora's Mask. A reversed version of the song became popular for its use in the Ben Drowned creepypasta, based on Majora's Mask.
