= Anju and Kafei =

Fictional characters

- The Legend of Zelda characters
- Kafei (left) and Anju (right), as they appear in The Legend of Zelda: Majora's Mask
- First appearance: The Legend of Zelda: Majora's Mask (2000)

Anju (Japanese: アンジュ) and Kafei (カーフェイ, Kāfei) are a pair of characters in the 2000 video game The Legend of Zelda: Majora's Mask. As a romantic couple, they are the subject of the sidequest "Testament of Love", wherein the protagonist Link is asked by Anju to find her fiancé Kafei; he had gone into hiding so he could recover a mask he was meant to give to Anju at their marriage ceremony, and he had also been turned into a child. Like all content in Majora's Mask, the quest is on a time limit and spans all three days in the game that take place before the moon crashes, destroying the world. Link can only retrieve the mask and reunite the couple on the final day, with the end of the quest taking place in the final moments.

This quest was added by the development team after going to a wedding of a staff member during a North Korean missile test, which prompted director Eiji Aonuma to discuss how strange it was to attend a wedding when missiles may strike. He also thought it would be interesting to include a wedding, since weddings were not common in games like The Legend of Zelda. He also wanted to make it more complicated for adult players, though noted that he appreciated Majora's Mask 3D making it easier to solve the quest. The couple and their quest received positive reception from players, regarded as one of the best quests in both The Legend of Zelda and video games as a whole by multiple critics. The reunion was considered rewarding in and of itself, and their romance was considered one of the best in gaming.

== Concept and creation ==
Anju's model is based on a character from The Legend of Zelda: Ocarina of Time called "Chicken Lady," identified by the game's development team as being a relatively normal character in the game. The wedding between Anju and Kafei was first conceived after members of the Majora's Mask development team attended a wedding of a staff member's shortly after Ocarina of Time's release. At the time, they were trying to figure out what events to include in Majora's Mask. The wedding occurred during the Taepodong-1 missile test by North Korea. Director Eiji Aonuma found the idea of attending a wedding when missiles may strike strange. The discussion eventually evolved into how such a setting would make sense for a setting with a falling moon. They also considered that a wedding is not a usual setting for a video game like The Legend of Zelda, and that it would be "really impactful" to include.

Aonuma, while discussing how complicated the sidequest was due to how hard it could be to figure out the steps, noted that he designed it this way to "age up the themes" and provide a "slightly more adult feeling drama moment here and there." He explained that they were accounting for the fact that their target audience was slightly older now, aiming it towards adults, and assumed that adults would be able to understand the quest more easily. He felt that limitations in the original Majora's Mask made this more complicated than he would have liked, and was glad to be able to make it easier in the 3DS re-release of Majora's Mask 3D.

== Appearances ==
Anju and Kafei appear in the 2000 video game The Legend of Zelda: Majora's Mask, a game that operates on an in-game three-day time limit (54 minutes in real time) that can be looped. The actions of multiple involved characters are on a schedule, meaning that players in control of Link must complete their quest - the Testament of Love - on a schedule, and thus can fail the quest. Their quest takes place across the entire three days span of time, and is the longest quest in the game. Anju is a worker at an inn, while Kafei is the son of the mayor. They were betrothed, but the mask Kafei was going to give Anju as part of a marriage ceremony was stolen, on top of Kafei being turned into a child by the game's antagonist, Skull Kid. Ashamed, Kafei went into hiding until he could retrieve the mask from the thief. Meanwhile, Anju continued working at the inn, worried about Kafei. Link becomes involved after agreeing to help search for Kafei.

When he inquires about him to Anju, she has him return later to give him a letter to deliver to Kafei. Link has it delivered to a child wearing a Keaton mask, who he discovers is Kafei. Kafei gives the Pendant of Memories to give to Anju, which makes Anju decide to wait for him. Kafei goes to find his mask at the thief's hideout in Ikana Canyon; if Link assists, the two of them are able to retrieve the mask before it is lost. Shortly before the moon's fall, Kafei reunites with Anju, who recognizes him despite his form. They hug before exchanging masks, becoming a couple, with Link receiving the Couple's Mask as their witness. They stay, deciding to greet the morning together. The day after Link stops the moon from falling, Anju and Kafei have their wedding.

Anju later appears in The Legend of Zelda: The Minish Cap as a different incarnation of the character. Kafei was also featured as a collectible Spirit in Super Smash Bros. Ultimate, collectibles that are associated with one of the game's playable characters and can be used to modify the play experience in some way.

== Critical reception ==
Anju and Kafei have received generally positive reception, their quest being praised as one of the best stories in Majora's Mask. Game Informer writer Blake Woog considered it one of the most famous and "heart-wrenching" sidequests in The Legend of Zelda, while Den of Geek writer Matthew Byrd called it the best quest in the series and one of the most complicated quests in any video game. He felt that, despite it being too frustrating or convoluted for some, the reward of finally getting them back together makes it worth it, more so than something in-game would have been. RPGFan writer Nilson Carroll highlighted it among the best The Legend of Zelda side quests, calling it "legendary" and discussing how it shows love persisting in darkness. Writer Taylor Yust felt Anju and Kafei's quest was a good example of synergy between gameplay and story. They felt similarly to Byrd that the real reward was reuniting the couple, feeling that the gameplay enhanced the quest's thematic significance to the player. BuzzFeed News writer Alanna Okun called the plot between Anju and Kafei the most "poignant subplot" in video games, disappointed that there hasn't been more material made about them. GamesRadar writer Connor Sheridan similarly felt that Anju and Kafei's quest was more enjoyable than the main story, a sentiment shared by Screen Rant writer Ross Griffin.

Anju and Kafei's romance was particularly well-received, with Nintendojo writer Katharine Byrne discussed it as a quality example of romance in video games. She talked about how hopeless it could be, particularly if their quest is completed without having first awoken all four of the Giants, as it would mean that they were only reunited so that they could die together since Link cannot stop the moon and must return to the past. She called the reunion between the two of them one of the most heartfelt moment in The Legend of Zelda. Destructoid writer Daniel Starkey praised their reunion, commenting on how their love is "completely mutual and elegantly expressed." He used this as an example of the "Lover's Reunion," disagreeing with Roger Ebert's skepticism of video games as art because of the interactivity of this quest. Fellow Destructoid writer called the reunion scene particularly memorable and emotional. Nintendo World Report writer Pedro Hernandez felt that it was a standout moment in the game, saying it "pulled [his] heartstrings." He felt that the ending was the best part of their story, being "romantic and bittersweet" due to having only so little time left together.

When considering the greatest couples in Nintendo games, Game Rant writer Michael Sriqui noted that while the rest of the list had at least one major character, he had to include Anju and Kafei, calling it the best sidequest in video games. He felt it was a beautiful story, saying that it could only work in video games. The Gamer writer Bella Blondeau regarded them as her favorite romantic couple in The Legend of Zelda and a "narrative highlight" of Majora's Mask. While she considered it bleak, she saw its depiction of "love overcoming all obstacles" as hopeful, feeling like the happiness of Anju and Kafei is one of the driving forces behind Link's quest to stop the moon from crashing. A writer for Game Developer discussed how Anju's unconditional love for Kafei despite Kafei's perceived failures teaches players that if someone truly loves them, that person will come to terms.
