= The Legend of Zelda: The Wind Waker =

2002 video game

- North American packaging artwork variant, depicting Link and the King of Red Lions (Note: One of the artworks used for the game's packaging in North America. Its original release, and later releases and releases in other regions feature different background patterns and gradients.)
- Developer: Nintendo EAD
- Publisher: Nintendo
- Director: Eiji Aonuma
- Producers: Shigeru Miyamoto; Takashi Tezuka
- Programmers: Toshio Iwawaki; Kazuaki Morita
- Artists: Yoshiki Haruhana; Satoru Takizawa; Masanao Arimoto
- Writers: Mitsuhiro Takano; Hajime Takahashi
- Composers: Kenta Nagata; Hajime Wakai; Toru Minegishi; Koji Kondo
- Series: The Legend of Zelda
- Platforms: GameCube; Wii U Nintendo Switch 2
- Release: December 13, 2002: GameCube; JP: December 13, 2002; NA: March 23, 2003; EU: May 2, 2003; AU: May 7, 2003; Wii U; NA: September 20, 2013; JP: September 26, 2013; EU: October 4, 2013; AU: October 5, 2013
- Genre: Action-adventure
- Modes: Single-player, multiplayer

The Legend of Zelda: The Wind Waker (Note: Japanese: ゼルダの伝説 風のタクト, Hepburn: Zeruda no Densetsu: Kaze no Takuto; lit. "The Legend of Zelda: Baton of Wind") is a 2002 action-adventure game developed and published by Nintendo for the GameCube. An installment in The Legend of Zelda series, it was released in Japan on December 13, 2002, in North America on March 23, 2003, and in Europe on May 2, 2003.

The game is set on a group of islands in a vast sea, a departure for the series. The player controls series protagonist Link as he attempts to save his sister from the sorcerer Ganon and becomes embroiled in a struggle for the Triforce, a sacred wish-granting relic. Aided by allies including pirate captain Tetra – an incarnation of Princess Zelda – and a talking sailboat named the King of Red Lions, Link sails the ocean, explores islands, and traverses dungeons to acquire the power necessary to defeat Ganon. Wind, which facilitates sailing, plays a prominent role and can be controlled with a magic conductor's baton called the Wind Waker.

The Wind Waker was directed by Eiji Aonuma and produced by Shigeru Miyamoto and Takashi Tezuka. Development began in 2000. It retains the basic 3D gameplay of its predecessors, Ocarina of Time and Majora's Mask, but the team chose to avoid the realistic graphics of previous games. Instead, they implemented a distinctive cartoon-like art style created through cel shading.

At its release, The Wind Waker received critical acclaim for its visuals, gameplay, level design, music, and story. The art direction proved divisive among players and contributed to comparatively weak sales; the game sold 4.6 million copies, far below the 7.6 million sold by Ocarina of Time. As a result, Nintendo changed directions with the next major Zelda installment, the more realistically styled Twilight Princess. The Wind Waker's reputation improved over time; with retrospective analyses, it is now considered one of the greatest video games ever made. The Wind Waker popularized the "Toon Link" character, and received two direct sequels for the Nintendo DS, Phantom Hourglass (2007) and Spirit Tracks (2009). A high-definition remaster, The Legend of Zelda: The Wind Waker HD, was released for the Wii U in September 2013. The original version of the game was re-released as a launch title for Nintendo Switch 2 as part of the Nintendo Classics service on June 5, 2025.

== Gameplay ==
The Wind Waker's cel-shaded art style makes use of real-time lighting and effects like depth-of-field blur, making the game look stylistically similar to a cartoon and setting it apart from other games in the series.

The Legend of Zelda: The Wind Waker is an action-adventure game with role-playing elements. The control scheme is comparable to its predecessors: the player moves the protagonist Link in three dimensions from a third-person perspective. Link fights with a sword and shield as well as a variety of other weapons and items. He interacts with non-player characters and objects via the action button. Like the previous games, The Wind Waker features a targeting system allowing Link to "lock on" and constantly face an enemy or target. A new feature is the ability to move the camera system around Link. Onscreen meters track Link's health and magic; Link can expand his health meter by finding "heart containers" and container pieces in the game.

The game world comprises 49 gridded sections of the "Great Sea", each containing an island or island chain. Some must be explored to continue the story, while others are optional. Like all Zelda games, The Wind Waker features several dungeons—large, enclosed areas where Link fights enemies, finds items, and solves puzzles to continue. Each dungeon quest concludes with a battle against a boss, a singularly powerful enemy. In addition to the main story, the game includes many sidequests, minor objectives the player can optionally complete to attain rewards. For example, Link can use the "Picto Box" – an in-game camera – to take pictures to fulfill quests.

Throughout the game, Link acquires items and weapons that provide new abilities. Items are often needed to reach certain areas, defeat bosses or other enemies, and advance the story. For example, the grappling hook is necessary to pass obstacles and defeat the boss in the Dragon Roost Cavern dungeon; it can then be used to enter previously inaccessible areas elsewhere. The "Tingle Tuner" is a special item allowing a second player to control the character Tingle if the system is connected to a Game Boy Advance by a link cable.

=== Wind and sailing ===
A significant portion of the game is spent sailing between islands on Link's boat, the King of Red Lions. The boat's sail is driven by wind that blows across the game world in one of eight directions; a tailwind behind the boat will give it top speed, while sailing against the wind is difficult. The Great Sea features enemies and obstacles different from those found on land; additionally, some items serve new purposes while Link is aboard the King of Red Lions. The grappling hook, for example, serves as a crane for recovering sunken treasure. Link explores the sea with the help of a sea chart, which can be updated with information on each square and island. Through the game, Link acquires additional charts pointing the way to treasure chests and significant locations. On land, dungeons feature similar maps.

Early in the game, Link receives the Wind Waker, a baton which allows him to control the wind and harness other powers by "conducting" specific melodies. The player controls the Wind Waker by moving the joypads to change pitch and time signature. The first melody, the "Wind's Requiem", enables Link to change the wind's direction, allowing him to sail anywhere. Link can learn five other tunes for the Wind Waker, which provide abilities such as warping to other regions and turning night to day.

== Synopsis ==
=== Background and setting ===
According to The Legend of Zelda: Hyrule Historia, Nintendo's official Legend of Zelda chronology, The Wind Waker takes place in the "New World" timeline, one of several parallel timelines in which Zelda games are set following the events of Ocarina of Time. The game follows the "Adult Link" timeline, after Link, the "Hero of Time", defeats Ganon and time-travels back to his childhood. A crisis emerges when Ganon returns, but Link does not. Centuries later, the people live on islands in the Great Sea. They preserve Link's story as a legend, but his kingdom's fate is unknown. The main character, a young boy also named Link, lives on Outset Island, where boys dress in green like the Hero of Time when they come of age.

=== Plot ===
While Link is celebrating his coming of age, a gigantic bird drops pirate captain Tetra into Outset Island's forest. Link rescues Tetra from monsters, but the bird carries off Link's sister Aryll. Tetra agrees to help Link find his sister, and they sail to the Forsaken Fortress, where the bird, the Helmaroc King, has been taking girls with long ears. Link finds Aryll and other kidnapped girls, but the Helmaroc King captures him and takes him to a man in black, who orders Link thrown into the sea.

Link is rescued at Windfall Island by a sentient sailboat, the King of Red Lions, who explains that the bird's master is a returned Ganon. To defeat him, Link must find the Hero of Time's power, which requires the three Pearls of the Goddesses. Link finds Din's Pearl on Dragon Roost Island, home of the avian Rito and the dragon Valoo; Farore's Pearl in Forest Haven, home of the Great Deku Tree and the plant-like Koroks; and Nayru's Pearl with the water spirit Jabun on Outset Island. The King of Red Lions then takes Link to the Tower of the Gods, where he faces trials before descending beneath the ocean to a castle suspended in time. Here Link finds the Hero of Time's weapon, the Master Sword.

Link returns to the Forsaken Fortress. Tetra's crew arrive and rescue the girls, but Ganon easily overpowers Link and Tetra; the Master Sword has lost its power. Ganon recognizes Tetra's Triforce necklace and realizes she is the incarnation of Princess Zelda he is seeking. Link's Rito allies and Valoo save Link and Tetra from Ganon. The King of Red Lions brings the two back to the underwater realm, explaining it is the legendary kingdom of Hyrule, which the goddesses submerged long ago to contain Ganon while the people fled to the mountaintops. The King of Red Lions reveals himself to be Daphnes Nohansen Hyrule, the last King of Hyrule, and Tetra is his heir, Zelda, keeper of the Triforce of Wisdom.

Tetra remains in the castle while Link and the King journey to the two sages who provided the Master Sword's power. They discover Ganon's forces murdered them both, so Link must awaken new sages, the Rito Medli and the Korok Makar, and guide them through the Earth and Wind Temples. The sages restore the Master Sword, but the King learns that Ganon has abandoned the Forsaken Fortress and fears an attack. They then track down the eight shards of the missing Triforce of Courage, once kept by the Hero of Time, and the gods recognize Link as the Hero of Winds.

Link and the King return to Hyrule to discover that Ganon has captured Tetra. Link follows them to Ganon's tower, defeating Ganon's minions before Ganon overcomes him. Ganon joins Link's and Tetra's Triforce pieces with his own Triforce of Power, forming the complete Triforce, which will grant his wish to rule the world. Before he can act, the King of Hyrule appears and wishes that the Goddesses wash Ganon and Hyrule away, and grant Link and Tetra hope for their own future. Link and Tetra battle Ganon with the Master Sword and magical arrows as water pours around them; with the final blow, the Master Sword turns Ganon to stone. Link and Tetra rise to the surface as the King and Hyrule are submerged. After reuniting with their friends, the heroes sail off to find a new land.

== Development ==
=== Game design ===
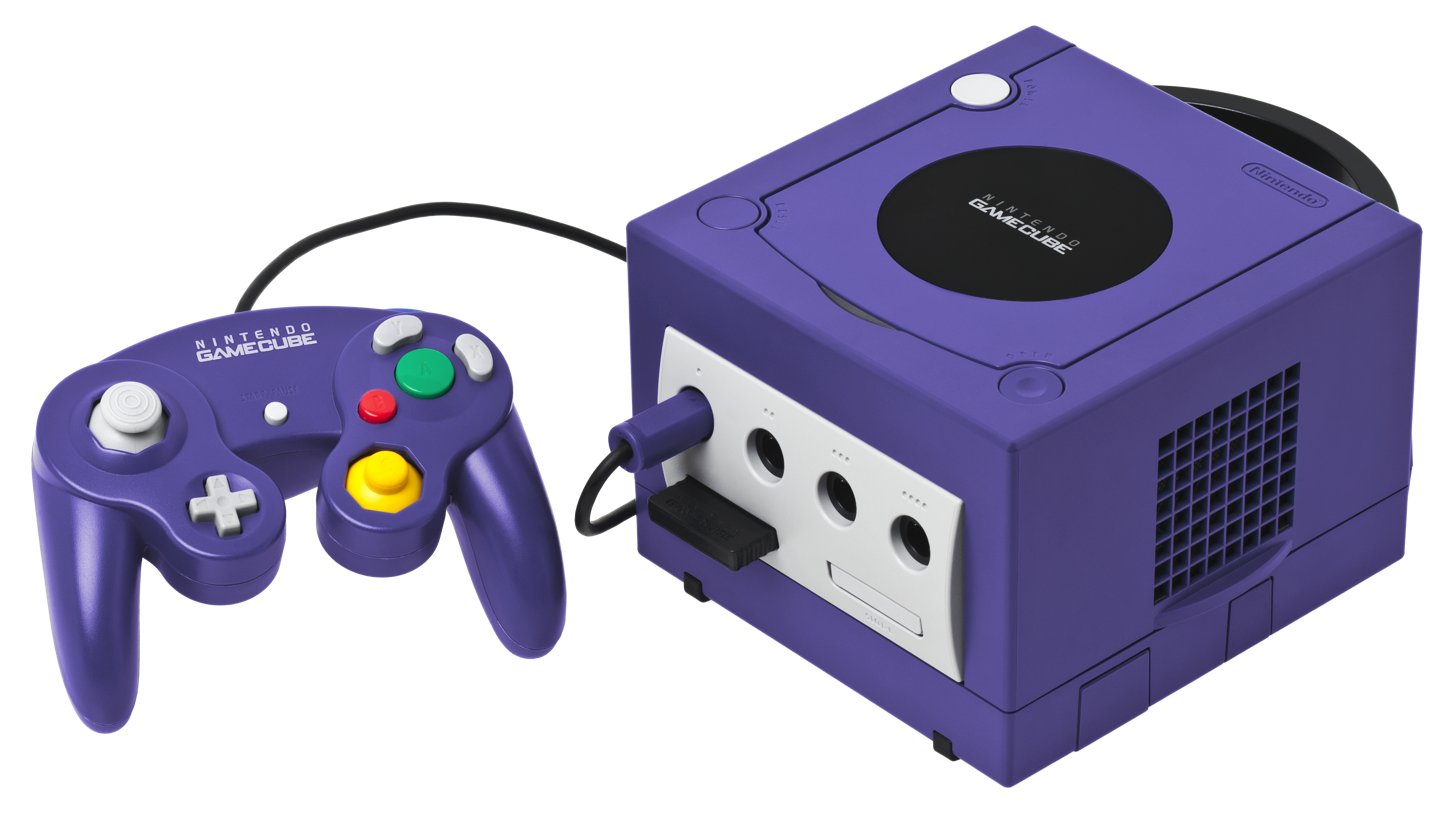
The Wind Waker was an early project developed for the GameCube.

Nintendo's Zelda team initiated plans for a new game early in the development of the GameCube system, before Majora's Mask was completed for the Nintendo 64 in 2000. Eiji Aonuma, director of Majora's Mask, returned to helm the project, while Shigeru Miyamoto and Takashi Tezuka, the creators of the Zelda series, served as producers. Early concepts generally followed Ocarina of Time's designs, with graphics enhanced for the new system's capabilities. The team hastily created a brief clip of Link fighting Ganondorf for a demonstration at the 2000 Space World exposition, where Nintendo announced the GameCube. The clip resonated with fans and commentators who hoped it previewed the next Zelda game.

The Zelda team, however, had exhausted its ideas for this style and format. Aonuma hated the demo, finding it derivative of past Zelda games. The team explored other directions until designer Yoshiki Haruhana created a cartoonish drawing of a young Link that caught their eye. Design manager Satoru Takizawa drew up an enemy Moblin in a similar style, and the team seized on the new gameplay and combat possibilities afforded by the stylized cartoon aesthetic. To achieve this look, they used cel shading on 3D models, giving the look of an interactive cartoon. The developers built the game with Alias/Wavefront's Maya 3D tool and a custom game engine. Aonuma initially kept the development quiet as he worried that Miyamoto would take issue with the cartoon style.

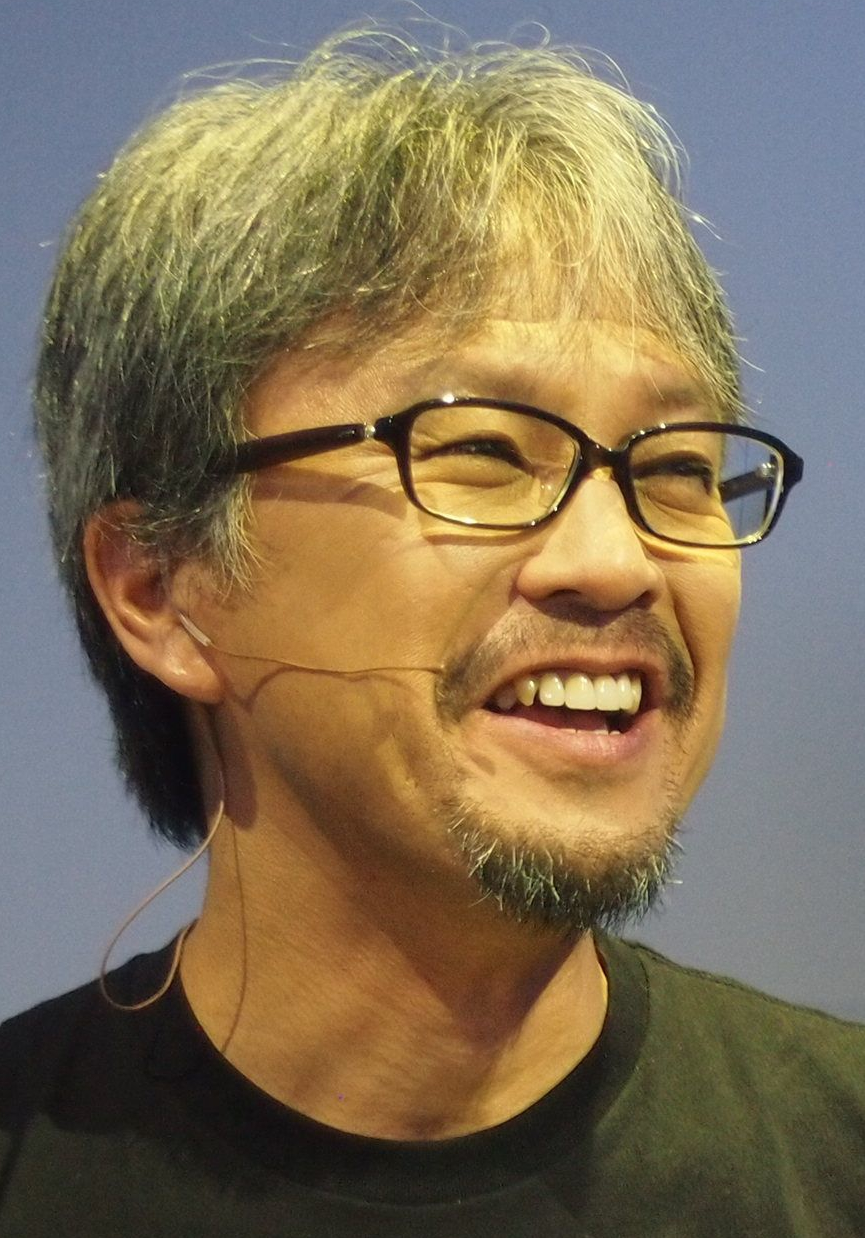
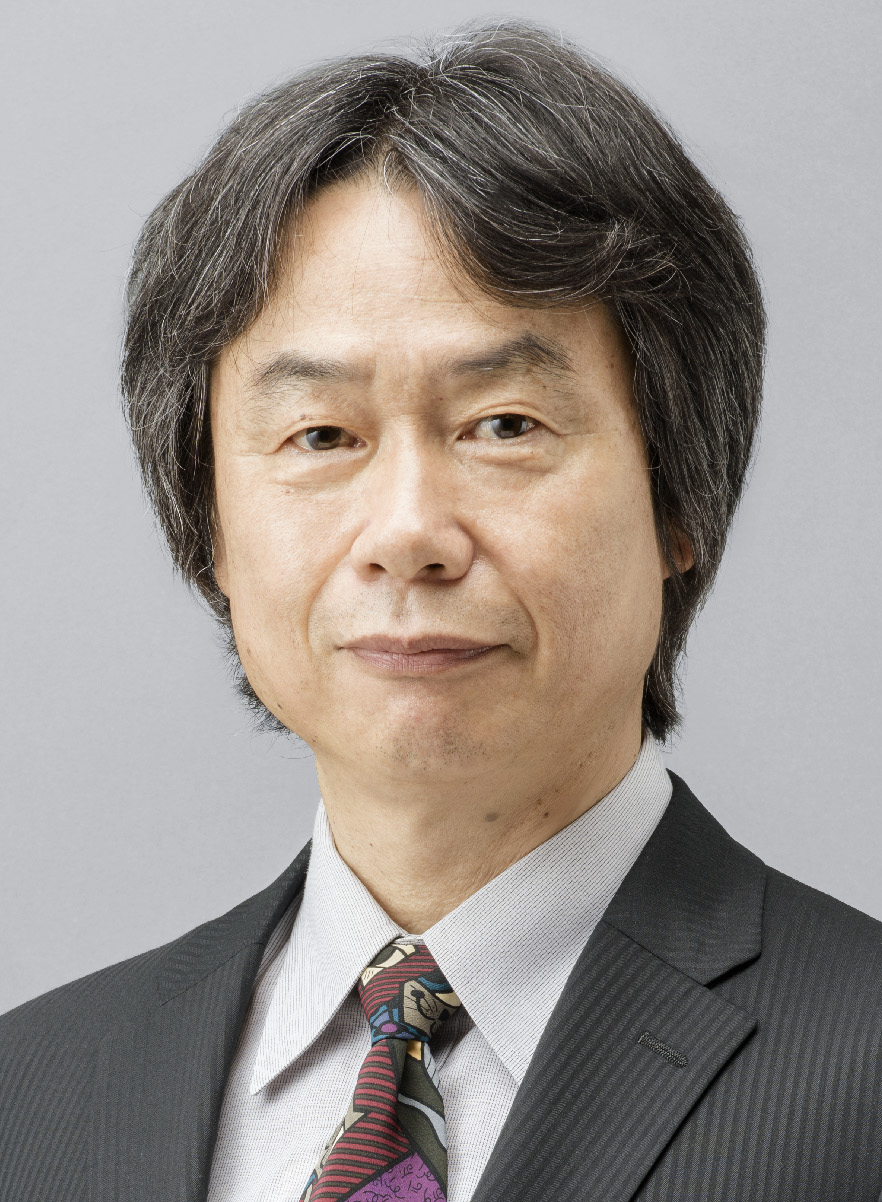
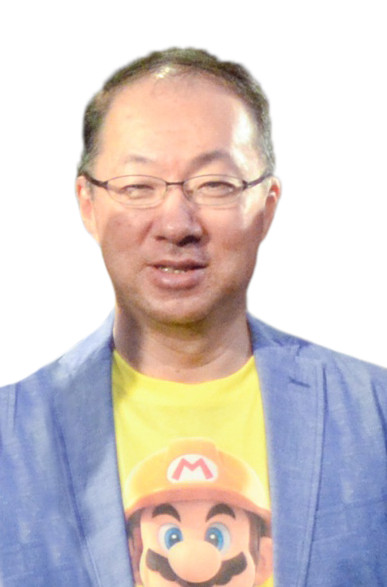
The director, co-producer and composer in 2013, 2015, and 2015, respectively: Eiji Aonuma, Shigeru Miyamoto, and Koji Kondo.

With this decision, development proceeded swiftly. The team quickly decided the setting would be islands in an ocean, determining it would provide interesting visuals and mechanics in the cel-shaded style. This in turn inspired the central sailing feature. As Aonuma predicted, some features drew skepticism from producers Miyamoto and Tezuka. For instance, they requested an explanation for the characters' exaggeratedly large eyes. Aonuma's team jokingly suggested having Link shoot beams from his eyes before deciding to have him focus his gaze on significant objects nearby, giving hints to observant players about what to do next. Miyamoto remained dubious of the art direction and reminded Aonuma that it was not too late to change course. Ultimately Miyamoto relented due to the team's enthusiasm about the cartoon style and the fact that it could have taken a decade to make a more realistic Zelda with their resources.

Nintendo presented a demo clip of the new game at the 2001 Space World. Response to the cel-shaded design was divided. While some attendees enjoyed the new look, there was backlash from disappointed fans who had hoped for a more realistic Zelda like the previous year's demo. Critics derisively dubbed the game "Celda". Miyamoto was surprised at the response and decided to limit revealing further information about the game until the team finished a playable demonstration, hoping to shift focus from the graphics to the gameplay.

Miyamoto introduced a playable demo at the next year's Electronic Entertainment Expo (E3), alongside another upcoming Zelda title for the GameCube, Four Swords Adventures. Miyamoto encountered glitches while he attempted to demonstrate Link's new ability to use enemies' dropped weapons. However, reception was more positive than that for the Space World demo. The game received the 2002 Game Critics Awards for Best Console Game at E3. IGN editor Fran Mirabella said the cartoon look "works very nicely" and that "it feels very much like Zelda". The whimsical style was compared to A Link to the Past and promotional artwork from previous Zelda games. The E3 demo also introduced new features, such as the ability to connect to the Game Boy Advance and receive help from Tingle. However, the art direction continued to divide audiences.

Development continued through late 2002, with targeted release dates of December in Japan and early 2003 in North America. During the final stages, two dungeons that fell behind schedule were cut and replaced with a quest to recover Triforce pieces around the Great Sea. Elements of these dungeons were recycled for later Zelda games. On October 15, 2002, Nintendo revealed the game's Japanese subtitle, Kaze no Takuto (Wind Baton), to emphasize the role of wind in the game. The company announced the English title, The Wind Waker, on December 2 the same year. In the gap between the Japanese and North American releases, the designers reworked some segments, notably shortening the lengthy Triforce quest.

=== Music ===
The music in The Wind Waker was composed by Kenta Nagata, Hajime Wakai, Toru Minegishi, and Koji Kondo. The sound team was significantly larger than for other contemporary projects to accommodate Nintendo's desire for a high caliber of work in the rushed development schedule. Koji Kondo, the primary composer for The Legend of Zelda series, contributed to the score but did not serve as sound director. However, the score incorporated some of his pieces from older Zelda games, modifying them to emphasize the time passed between the stories.

The soundtrack is primarily environmental; it modulates between various tracks depending on location, time and other conditions. Much of the score is inspired by traditional Irish music and is overall lighter and more upbeat than previous scores in the series. The advancement of MIDI technology allowed the soundtrack to more closely approximate the sounds of real instruments than was possible in previous installments. The score features strings, winds, brass, percussion, and wordless vocals. The vocals are especially prominent in the tunes Link conducts with the Wind Waker, singing in D major. Shigeru Miyamoto reportedly played the mandolin featured in the "Title Theme". Scitron Digital Content released a two-disc, 133-track soundtrack album, The Legend of Zelda: The Wind Waker Original Sound Tracks, on March 19, 2003.

== Release and promotion ==
The Wind Waker was released on December 13, 2002, in Japan, on March 24, 2003, in North America, and on May 2, 2003, in Europe. To promote the release, Nintendo offered a bonus disc as a pre-order incentive which included a GameCube port of Ocarina of Time as well as its previously unreleased expansion, Ura Zelda. Ura Zelda, largely an adaptation of Ocarina of Time with some changes, including new dungeon challenges, had been developed for the Nintendo 64's 64DD peripheral, but was shelved when that system failed. Ura Zelda was named Ocarina of Time Master Quest in North America and Europe. Ocarina of Time/Master Quest discs became popular items in their own right in North America, with some customers making and then cancelling pre-orders to get them. To avoid this issue in Europe, Nintendo released the item only in two-disc packages with The Wind Waker.

In May 2003, Nintendo bundled The Wind Waker with limited edition GameCubes in North America and Europe. On November 17 that year, Nintendo launched another promotion via a compilation disc, The Legend of Zelda Collector's Edition. The disc includes playable versions of the original Legend of Zelda, Zelda II: The Adventure of Link, Ocarina of Time, and Majora's Mask, as well as a Wind Waker demo and two featurettes. Never sold commercially, the Collector's Edition was included in another GameCube bundle and was made available to existing GameCube owners who either registered their system or subscribed to Nintendo Power. The compilation became a coveted item among fans; in the United Kingdom and Ireland, the 1000 allotted copies were claimed within minutes. To satisfy frustrated customers there, Nintendo offered additional copies to those who purchased select GameCube games.

=== The Wind Waker HD ===
Comparison of the graphics from Wind Waker HD (bottom) with those from the original GameCube version

In 2013, Nintendo developed a high definition re-release of The Wind Waker, The Legend of Zelda: The Wind Waker HD, for the Wii U. The inspiration came when staff converted elements from various games to explore the system's capabilities while planning for Breath of the Wild. The developers experimented with several Zelda games, but were especially struck by how well The Wind Waker translated into high definition. When the team determined it would take less than a year to remaster the entire game, Aonuma approached Miyamoto about developing it. He faced considerable reluctance from management due to players' mixed response in 2003, but Miyamoto ultimately greenlit development as Nintendo staff had found that opinions of the game had warmed over the years. Aonuma served as producer, while Daiki Iwamoto served as director. The soundtrack was updated by Kenta Nagata, Hajime Wakai, Asuka Hayazaki, and Atsuko Asahi. While the game was developed in-house at Nintendo Entertainment Analysis & Development (EAD), high-resolution textures were produced with the help of a few external companies. The entire project took six months to develop.

The Wind Waker HD features high definition graphics and improved lighting. The Wii U GamePad's touchscreen serves as a map and inventory, eliminating the need to toggle between gameplay and the menu interface. Players can use motion controls to control the Wind Waker. Some weapons, like the bow, can be aimed using the GamePad's gyroscope, as in Ocarina of Time 3D. The game supports Off-TV Play, which enables the player to play the game solely on the Wii U GamePad. The game can also be played on the Wii U Pro Controller, a controller similar to the one used in the original game. The developers made some changes to the gameplay as well: they introduced a new item, the "Swift Sail", allowing for faster sailing on the Great Sea. They also streamlined the Triforce quest, improved the Picto Box, and replaced the Tingle Tuner, which had required connectivity with a Game Boy Advance, with a Tingle Bottle item that connected to the Miiverse service prior to its shutdown on November 8, 2017.

A limited-edition console bundle that combines both a digital version of the game and the Deluxe Wii U console was released on September 20, 2013, in North America. The black console features a GamePad with a golden Hylian Crest and golden The Wind Waker-styled Hylian letters and symbols. A redemption code for a digital copy of The Legend of Zelda: Hyrule Historia was also included. A Ganondorf figurine was released with a special edition copy of the game, available exclusively through GameStop.

=== Switch 2 re-release ===
Coinciding with the launch of the Nintendo Switch 2 on June 5, 2025, Nintendo added the original GameCube version of The Wind Waker to Nintendo Switch Online's Nintendo Classics library of emulated games. It was one of the first three GameCube titles released for Nintendo Classics, and is exclusive to the Switch 2 via the premium "Nintendo Switch Online + Expansion Pack" subscription tier.

== Reception ==
=== Critical reception ===
Reception

Aggregate score
Aggregator	Score
Metacritic	96/100 (Note: Based on 80 reviews)

Review scores
Publication	Score
AllGame	4.5/5
Computer and Video Games	10/10
Edge	9/10
Electronic Gaming Monthly	9.5/10, 10/10, 10/10
Eurogamer	9/10
Famitsu	10/10, 10/10, 10/10, 10/10
Game Informer	10/10
GamePro	5/5
GameRevolution	A−
GameSpot	9.3/10
GameSpy	97/100
IGN	9.6/10
NGC Magazine	96%
Nintendo Power	5/5
Nintendo World Report	10/10

Award
Publication	Award
GameFAQs, Games, GameSpot, Nintendo Power, Planet GameCube	Game of the Year

The Wind Waker received widespread critical acclaim. Review aggregator website Metacritic calculated a score of 96/100 based on 80 reviews, indicating "universal acclaim". It was the fourth game to receive a perfect score from the Japanese magazine Famitsu, and additionally earned perfect scores from Computer and Video Games, Game Informer, Game Pro, Nintendo Power, and Planet GameCube. It received high marks from many other reviewers as well, although it did not reach the levels of critical acclaim that had greeted Ocarina of Time.

While often noting fans' ambivalence about the cel shading, critics praised the game's visuals. Reviewers likened the game to a playable cartoon, with several positively comparing the animation to the films of Disney and Hayao Miyazaki. In particular, critics appreciated the characters' unique expressiveness, and found that the fine details and environments added richness to the game world. Famitsu's reviewers wrote that the rich design brings all the game's elements together into a cohesive whole. Electronic Gaming Monthly's reviewers found the animation quality unparalleled in games and wrote that "The Wind Waker's new look is as effective as it is unique". Matt Casamassina of IGN said that though some fans hold distaste for the graphics, Nintendo's execution represented the pinnacle of the GameCube's capabilities and of cel shading technology. Jeff Gerstmann of GameSpot said that skepticism about the visuals was "unfounded" and wrote that the character design "adds emotional weight" to the storyline. Steve Thomason of Nintendo Power wrote that though he was initially skeptical, the visuals worked "brilliantly, framing the most enjoyable game play experience I've had since Ocarina of Time".

Critics also lauded the gameplay, in particular the responsive control system, fluid combat, and puzzles. Several reviews noted the similarity of its gameplay to that of Ocarina of Time, though they praised enhancements such as the ability to move the camera, perform counterattacks, and use enemy items. Casamassina reassured players that beyond visual differences between The Wind Waker and Ocarina, "these two games are very much alike". Andrew Reiner of Game Informer wrote that the gameplay expanded upon that in its predecessors to become "far greater, deeper, and more complex", while Shane Bettenhausen of Electronic Gaming Monthly said that "Wind Waker's core gameplay is the best the series has ever had". On the other hand, Edge said that while the game would awe new players, its similarity to previous Zelda games meant that veteran players may find it "'merely' brilliant". Famitsu wrote that the game's user friendliness would appeal even to novice players. Casamassina praised the intuitive controls, the especially interactive environment, and the variety of game actions, which "can be executed with a precision that few other games could offer". Gerstmann appreciated the breadth of items that can be used. Bettenhausen said that the high variety of options for progressing through fights and puzzles kept the game from ever getting boring. GamePro's Star Dingo enjoyed the variety of combo attacks and puzzles, calling the game "a combination of vivid artistry and timeless gameplay".

Other elements that commonly received praise include the expansive game world and level design, especially in the dungeons. The storyline also received praise; Nintendo Power's Steven Grimm called the game "a masterpiece of style and storytelling". Several critics lauded the score and soundtrack, though some cited the lack of voice acting as a drawback.

The heavy emphasis on sailing was the game's most common criticism, especially later in the game when Link must trek around the ocean to collect Triforce pieces. Gerstmann wrote that while the main quest "starts out in a very brisk manner", by the last third of the game, the "focus on sailing ... is pretty tedious". Edge wrote that the sailing was "convincingly organic", but even with the warp feature, "there remains an awful lot of relatively dull seafaring activity". Others complained about having to use the Wind Waker so frequently to change wind direction. Casamassina wrote that using the device became "a tedious nuisance" and that the inability to skip the accompanying animation was "more bothersome still". Some reviewers enjoyed the sailing; Electronic Gaming Monthly's Bettenhausen and Greg Sewart appreciated the combat, exploration, and side quests available at sea. Another common criticism was the game's comparatively low level of difficulty. Casamassina wrote that once the player added enough hearts to Link's health meter, "he becomes nearly invincible, which is a true shortcoming as far as we [sic] concerned".

Several publications named The Wind Waker Game of the Year, including GameSpot, Nintendo Power, GameFAQs, Planet GameCube, and Games magazine. IGN gave it the Readers' Choice award for 2003 and named it Best Adventure Game for the GameCube. The game was ranked 157th in Electronic Gaming Monthly's "The Top 200 Video Games of Their Time" in 2006. It received the Excellence in Visual Arts award at the 2004 Game Developers Choice Awards and was a finalist for the GDCA Game of the Year award. The Wind Waker won "Outstanding Achievement in Art Direction" at the 7th Annual Interactive Achievement Awards; it also received eight other nominations: "Game of the Year", "Console Game of the Year", "Console Platform Action/Adventure Game of the Year", "Outstanding Innovation in Console Gaming", and outstanding achievement in "Game Design", "Gameplay Engineering", "Visual Engineering", and "Character or Story Development".

=== Audience response and sales ===
Player response to the game remained divided over the cel-shaded design. Reception was comparatively warm in Japan, where various media commonly borrow an anime aesthetic, but was much more divided in North America. Some players appreciated the design and Aonuma's vision, but others found it childish and too far removed from the more realistic designs of previous games. According to Stephen Totilo of Kotaku, much of the backlash came from a contemporary anxiety that Nintendo was losing its edge by focusing on games for children, as opposed to the more mature, realistic fare developed by competitors.

The Wind Waker generated the most successful pre-order campaign in Nintendo history at the time. However, sales did not live up to expectations; director Aonuma noted that purchases were disappointing in both Japan and North America. Japanese sales suffered from a general decline in the video game market caused by consumers shifting away from games, a phenomenon known as "gamer drift". The overall market remained strong in North America, but The Wind Waker's sales were slow there and had declined markedly by the time they reached one million. The Wind Waker sold 4.6 million copies, far below the 7.6 million record set by Ocarina of Time. Nintendo of America attributed the game's comparatively weak North American sales in large part to the cel-shaded graphics, which turned off many players, particularly older teenagers who made up The Legend of Zelda's traditional audience. Miyamoto further blamed a failure to introduce major innovations to excite established players or attract new ones.

=== The Wind Waker HD ===
The Wind Waker HD was critically acclaimed; Metacritic calculated a score of 90/100 based on 70 reviews. The improved graphics of the game from the original received positive commentary. Dan Ryckert of Game Informer noted that the upgrade was immediately apparent, and that "the vivid colors and crashing waves of the flooded Hyrule [look] fantastic". IGN's Jose Otero stated that the game "looks great". Andrew Fitch of Electronic Gaming Monthly claimed that the game "enhances the already excellent Wind Waker visuals with HD flair".

The game's first week sales in Japan were 30,000 physical copies. In the week following the release of Wind Waker HD, sales of the Wii U console increased by 685% in the UK. As of September 2023, it has worldwide sales of 2.37 million units.

== Legacy ==
=== Sequels and other media ===
Nintendo initially planned a direct sequel for the GameCube, developed by Aonuma's Zelda team under the working title Wind Waker 2. However, The Wind Waker's underwhelming reception in North America, combined with the downturn in the Japanese video game market, convinced Aonuma that the only avenue to success would be a more realistic Zelda game that would appeal to the stronger North American market. He persuaded Miyamoto, who authorized development of a realistically styled game using The Wind Waker's engine, Twilight Princess, which proved to be a major success for the GameCube and the newly released Wii.

The Wind Waker originated the variant of the Link character named "Toon Link", who appeared in several later Nintendo games. The Wind Waker received two direct sequels for the Nintendo DS handheld system. Wanting to continue The Wind Waker's story and art style, in 2007 Aonuma produced Phantom Hourglass, which follows Link and Tetra as they explore new reaches of the Great Sea. Spirit Tracks (2009) is set roughly a century later and features a new Link and Zelda, the latter a descendent of Tetra, as they traverse New Hyrule with a magical train. Toon Link also returned in indirectly related Legend of Zelda games such as Four Swords Adventures (2004), The Minish Cap (2005), and Tri Force Heroes (2015). He also features as a playable character in Nintendo's Super Smash Bros. crossover fighting game series, and along with other Wind Waker characters, in the 2016 Zelda pastiche Hyrule Warriors Legends.

Conductors of the concert tour The Legend of Zelda: Symphony of the Goddesses have used custom-made Wind Waker batons. The Wind Waker also influenced 2017's Breath of the Wild, which features a similarly stylized art design, but with more realistic proportions. Breath of the Wild also includes species from The Wind Waker among other references, leading some fans to speculate that it follows the "Adult Timeline" established by The Wind Waker.

=== Later reputation ===
The Wind Waker has continued to be acclaimed by critics. It has appeared in various lists of the best video games, including those compiled by Electronic Gaming Monthly, Nintendo Power, and IGN. Nintendo Power named The Wind Waker the fourth best game to ever appear on a Nintendo console, while Official Nintendo Magazine placed it 12th. Nintendo Power listed its ending as one of the greatest in Nintendo history, due to the final battle's climax. UGO listed The Wind Waker on their list of the "Top 50 Games That Belong On the 3DS". In a retrospective on the GameCube, IGN named The Wind Waker the fourth best game ever released for the system. Nintendo Power named The Wind Waker the second best GameCube game of all time, behind only Resident Evil 4.

Later pieces have noted that The Wind Waker's divisive reputation among fans improved over time and that it has come to be seen as a classic. Several writers have said that the game and its stylized aesthetic aged well, whereas contemporary games with more realistic graphics often became dated. The graphics that initially divided opinion have become a favorite feature; some former skeptics have written about revising their initial opinions. Nintendo representatives describe this turnaround as a particularly dramatic example of the "Zelda cycle", in which fans' negative responses to Zelda games improve over time. In 2013, Keza MacDonald of IGN wrote that The Wind Waker had outlived its initial reception and become "popularly considered among the very best Zeldas".
