= List of The Legend of Zelda: Breath of the Wild and Tears of the Kingdom characters =

Some of the main characters from The Legend of Zelda: Breath of the Wild, as seen in Hyrule Warriors: Age of Calamity. Counter-clockwise from top: Revali, Mipha, Urbosa, Link, Terrako, Daruk, and Princess Zelda. In the background are Guardians, Moblins, Bokoblins, and Calamity Ganon circling Hyrule Castle.

Nintendo's action-adventure game The Legend of Zelda: Breath of the Wild is a game in The Legend of Zelda series, originally released in 2017 for the Wii U and Nintendo Switch. Following a century of stasis in the Shrine of Resurrection, an amnesiac Link awakens to the kingdom of Hyrule ravaged by Calamity Ganon. He sets out to free the spirits of the Champions, the riders of four enormous animalistic machines known as Divine Beasts, rescue Princess Zelda, and save Hyrule by defeating Calamity Ganon. The game's sequel, The Legend of Zelda: Tears of the Kingdom, released in 2023 exclusively for the Nintendo Switch, takes place a few years after the defeat of Calamity Ganon and expands on its predecessor's map and cast of characters. In this game, Link works to defeat the newly revived Demon King Ganondorf and save Hyrule again, while Zelda is time-displaced and must figure out a way back to her time.

Link is the sole playable swordsman in both games. Throughout both games, he encounters multiple characters such as: Robbie and Purah, a pair of Sheikah researchers who operate the Hateno Tech Lab; Master Kohga, leader of the Yiga Clan; Hestu, a large, maraca-playing Korok who upgrades Link's inventory slots with Korok Seeds; Urbosa, a Gerudo chief and Champion of the Divine Beast Vah Naboris; and Sidon, the younger brother of Champion Mipha, prince and eventual king of the Zora, and the Sage of Water. Many of these characters, including Link, reappear in Breath of the Wild's timeline prequel spin-off Hyrule Warriors: Age of Calamity. Some characters reappear in its follow-up Hyrule Warriors: Age of Imprisonment, a prequel to Tears of the Kingdom which takes place during the flashback sequences depicting the Imprisoning War.

Breath of the Wild is the first canon Zelda game to implement full voice acting, which is continued with its sequel Tears of the Kingdom, although Link remains a silent protagonist in both games. According to series producer Eiji Aonuma, this decision was made following the first time he heard a character's voice early in the game development, a moment which he felt "was really striking emotions." Both games were released to universal acclaim, being nominated for and winning multiple gaming awards. While the voice acting in both games received some criticism, the characters were generally well received by multiple gaming publications. Certain characters, in particular Purah, Urbosa, and Sidon, became fan favorites and were identified as standout characters.

== Creation and conception ==
When designing The Legend of Zelda's mainstay characters Zelda, Link, and Ganon for Breath of the Wild, game director Hidemaro Fujibayashi discussed the different approaches taken to each of the characters. Link wears a blue tunic as opposed to his previous incarnations' green tunic and hat, a decision art director Satoru Takizawa says was the result of the developers wanting to depart from series tradition and subvert player expectations. Both he and series producer Eiji Aonuma describe this design as a way to make Link feel more "neutral" to the player. Zelda's design, according to Fujibayashi, was the result of the game's designers and story planners combining their different perspectives into how her design should look. While the story planners drafted designs stemming from who she is and why the player should care about saving her, the game designers drafted designs prioritizing "first impressions" and how she could "make [the player] feel something deep inside." Ganon, known in game as Calamity Ganon, was designed with him as the game's final boss in mind. Fujibayashi described "'final boss' criteria" such as his size and visual design, along with the "material feeling of the world", as factors in his design. When designing Ganondorf, Ganon's human form encountered in Tears of the Kingdom, the design team wanted to highlight both his physical attractiveness and his evil nature. Fujibayashi characterizes his design as "overwhelmingly evil", "handsome enough that both men and women would fall for him", and "sexy".

Breath of the Wild marks the first major appearance of the Sheikah, a race of ninja-like warriors that operate as one tribe. Previously, the only Sheikah to regularly appear in the series was Impa, with the Sheikah tribe only ever being mentioned. They were designed with a Japanese aesthetic to differentiate them with other characters, according to lead artist Hirohito Shinoda. Characters of the Sheikah tribe and the recurring Hylian race had their faces created with a specialized tool, with their faces changed almost every day during development. Four of Hyrule's other races, Goron, Zora, Rito, and Gerudo, were designed with the sketches of the Champions as their foundation, which in turn are based on how a generic member of each race would look. One of the champions was planned to resemble a Kokiri before being changed to a Rito. The Champions were designed to be "a bit of a throwback to characters of previous titles", such as Daruk who is "reminiscent of Darunia from Ocarina of Time." The Gorons' designs forego their usual tattoos in favor of a "clean design." They were designed similarly to sumo wrestlers, focusing on their body fat and muscles to make them look big and "powerful." The Zoras are more physically diverse than their past appearance, having different colors and head sizes. Their appearances are based on a variety of fish, sharks, dolphins, and other animals. The Rito were designed to "emphasize their bird-like silhouette", and have a more bird-like appearance since their then-only appearance in The Wind Waker. The Gerudo were redesigned to have shorter torsos and longer legs, with details influenced Buddhist statues.

== Main characters ==
=== Link ===
Link (Note: Japanese: リンク, Hepburn: Rinku) is the main protagonist of The Legend of Zelda: Breath of the Wild, its sequel Tears of the Kingdom, and The Legend of Zelda series as a whole. This incarnation of Link is designated as the Hero of the Wild. Prior to his century-long stasis, he was a knight for Hyrule's royal family, Princess Zelda's appointed bodyguard, and the Hylian Champion. While he does not initially operate a Divine Beast in the main game, the downloadable content (DLC) pack The Champions' Ballad rewards him with the Master Cycle Zero, a motorcycle-like Divine Beast resembling a horse. His signature weapon is the Master Sword, which must be restored to its full power in both games.

In Breath of the Wild's backstory, he is severely wounded following Calamity Ganon's surprise attack on Hyrule in an event that is later referred to as "The Great Calamity". He is placed in the Shrine of Resurrection by two Sheikah members under the orders of Zelda. His weapon, the Master Sword, is hidden by Zelda in Korok Forest under the protection of the Great Deku Tree. He awakens 100 years later to a ravaged Hyrule, where the spirit of King Rhoam, Zelda's father, implores him to rescue Zelda and defeat Ganon. Following a reunion with Impa, an elderly Sheikah and former advisor to the royal family, Link is tasked with purging the Divine Beasts and freeing the spirits of the Champions to assist his eventual battle with Ganon. Link is successful in purging the Divine Beasts and defeating Ganon, who transforms into Dark Beast Ganon. Zelda imparts to Link the Bow of Light to weaken Ganon, allowing her to seal him away and restore peace to Hyrule.

A few years later, in Tears of the Kingdom, Link and Zelda explore the cavern underneath Hyrule Castle to investigate "gloom", a mysterious substance that has been poisoning the people of Hyrule. They discover a mummified Demon King Ganondorf, who frees himself from a disembodied arm holding him in place and attacks both Link and Zelda. The two are separated, with Link's right arm heavily injured during the attack and the Master Sword shattered. Link is rescued by the arm that held Ganondorf in place, while Zelda is sent back into the distant past. Link awakens to find the arm, later revealed to be that of King Rauru, that saved him wrapped around his damaged arm, rendering it not only usable once again, but allowing him to access new powers. Throughout the game, he ventures into various ancient temples built by an extinct, technologically advanced race known as the Zonai, and discovers their secret stones, artifacts belonging to ancient sages, which are passed down to Link's allies who become the succeeding sages. With a restored Master Sword, and aid from his sage allies, he heads into Hyrule Castle to defeat Ganondorf. Following Ganondorf's defeat, Link and Zelda reunite, with the spirits of Rauru and Sonia restoring his right arm before passing on.

Marking a departure from his incarnations' signature green tunic and green cap, Link is depicted in promotional material and official art wearing a blue tunic. According to series producer Eiji Aonuma and art director Satoru Takizawa, he and the staff wanted to subvert players' expectations on Link's outfit and depict him as "a more neutral character that players could see themselves as." More than 100 designs were considered during the process of redesigning Link.

He is voiced by Kengo Takanashi, who provides Link's grunts, yells, and other vocal sounds.

=== Princess Zelda ===
Princess Zelda (Note: Japanese: ゼルダ姫, Hepburn: Zeruda-hime) is Hyrule's princess and leader of the Champions, serving as a major character in Breath of the Wild and Tears of the Kingdom, and as the main protagonist of Hyrule Warriors: Age of Imprisonment. Her signature weapon is the Bow of Light, which is able to destroy Calamity Ganon's physical form.

Prior to the start of Breath of the Wild, Zelda worked on training her magic to prepare for the day Ganon returns, much to her own struggle. At some point during her training, Link is assigned to be her bodyguard, with whom she forms a friendship with. On the day of the Great Calamity, she and the Champions unsuccessfully resist Ganon, leading to the deaths of most of the Champions. She is able to save Link, the surviving champion, by having him placed in the Shrine of Resurrection and having his Master Sword safely hidden with the help of the Great Deku Tree. Her powers awaken in time for her to seal away Ganon for 100 years. Following Link's victory over Ganon, who quickly transforms into Dark Beast Ganon, she bestows upon Link her Bow of Light, which he uses to help her seal Ganon away once more.

In Tears of the Kingdom, she is separated from Link after a surprise attack by Demon King Ganondorf and is sent back 10,000 years in the past where she encounters Hyrule's founders King Rauru and Queen Sonia. After witnessing Ganondorf's rise to power and failing to stop him, she undergoes a process known as "draconification", where she turns into an immortal dragon. Now turned into the Light Dragon, Zelda is able to safely protect the Master Sword as its power grow over the course of 10,000 years, with the hopes of Link collecting the sword and using it to defeat Ganondorf. Following the final battle with Ganondorf, Zelda is able to return to her normal, pre-dragon self.

She is voiced by Patricia Summersett in English and Yū Shimamura in Japanese.

=== Calamity Ganon ===
Calamity Ganon (Note: Japanese: 厄災ガノン, Hepburn: Yakusai Ganon) is a large, demonic entity who serves as the main antagonist of Breath of the Wild and Hyrule Warriors: Age of Calamity. This version of Ganon is a malevolent force, manifested from his malice and hatred. Unlike his previous forms and depictions, Calamity Ganon acts more as a force of nature as opposed to a sentient being with malevolent intentions.

Ten thousand years prior to the start of Breath of the Wild, he unsuccessfully waged a war on Hyrule, ending with him being sealed by the Sheikah and Hylian armies. During the course of this war, the Sheikah developed the four Divine Beasts and an army of war machines known as Guardians. Despite the instrumental role these technologies had in sealing away Calamity Ganon, he later took control over them when he broke free from his seal and initiated the Great Calamity. After killing the Champion pilots of the Divine Beasts and gravely injuring Link, he was confined to Hyrule Castle following Zelda's powers awakening. One hundred years later, Link frees the Divine Beasts from his control and defeats him with the help of Zelda.

=== Ganondorf ===
Ganondorf, (Note: Japanese: ガノンドロフ, Hepburn: Ganondorofu) also known as the Demon King, is the Gerudo leader who serves as the main antagonist of The Legend of Zelda: Tears of the Kingdom and Hyrule Warriors: Age of Imprisonment. He is the source of a poisonous substance known as "gloom", which has been the cause of an illness outbreak across Hyrule. While not explicitly stated, it is heavily implied that Ganondorf is the source of Calamity Ganon from the previous game.

At the start of Tears of the Kingdom, Link and Zelda witness a mummified Ganondorf break free from a disembodied arm that had been restraining him under Hyrule Castle. He attacks both of them, separating them and sending Zelda 10,000 years in the past. In-game memories depict Ganondorf's rise to power, where it is shown that after an unsuccessful attempt to conquer Hyrule by force, he decides to deceive the Hyrulean royalty instead. He attempts to gain the trust of King Rauru and Queen Sonia, who concur with a time-displaced Zelda that Ganondorf should be watched closely. Later, he kills Queen Sonia and steals her Secret Stone, a Zonai artifact that amplifies the user's powers. Summoning hordes of monsters with the Secret Stone, Ganondorf takes over Hyrule while King Rauru, Zelda, and the surviving sages plot how to stop him. Eventually, they confront him, and King Rauru is able to seal Ganondorf, ending the conflict that became known as the Imprisoning War.

100 years prior to Calamity Ganon's defeat, Ganondorf's seal was weakened when the Great Calamity damaged Hyrule Castle, which resulted in his power increasing over the past century. After breaking free from his seal in the present, Ganondorf initiates the Upheaval, an event resulting in Hyrule Castle becoming suspended in the air, gloom becoming more widespread, Zonai ruins falling from the sky, and chasms that lead to the underground known as the Depths. He is eventually confronted by Link and the new sages in the Depths below Hyrule Castle. Nearing defeat, Ganondorf swallows his secret stone to become the Demon Dragon. With help from Zelda in her Light Dragon form, Link destroys Ganondorf's secret stone, killing him and ending his assault against Hyrule.

He is voiced by Matthew Mercer in English and Kosuke Takaguchi in Japanese.

== Champions ==
=== Mipha ===
Mipha (Note: Japanese: ミファー, Hepburn: Mifā) was the Zora Princess, Champion, and pilot of Divine Beast Vah Ruta, the Divine Beast that takes the form of an elephant. Mipha was the first of the Champions to master her Divine Beast. Her signature weapon is the Lightscale Trident. She is voiced by Amelia Gotham in English and Mayu Isshiki in Japanese.

Mipha, alongside the other three Champions, died during the battle with Calamity Ganon. In the game's backstory, Mipha and Link were once childhood friends. In the Memory "Mipha's Touch", Mipha reminisces with Link about their past and promises to always heal him. Mipha is shown to have romantic feelings for Link, to the extent that she makes Zora armor, garments crafted by each Zora Princess for their future husband, for him to wear, but it is not revealed whether he returns her affections. Her spirit is set free in the present day after Link awakens 100 years later and helps to reclaim control of Divine Beast Vah Ruta. Afterwards, she bestows Mipha's Grace upon him, which is a powerful healing ability that brings Link back to life should he run out of health, and sets Ruta up on a mountain to take aim on Calamity Ganon. She apologizes to her father for not returning safely and wishes that she could see her family again. Link honors her memory by wearing the Zora armor that she made for him and by aiding the Zora.

Mipha also appears in Hyrule Warriors: Age of Calamity as a playable character. She has the ability to heal herself and her allies on the battlefield. She also uses her ability to manipulate water to create water-based attacks. Mipha plays a major role in the storyline as one of the four Champions. During a cutscene, she accepts her role as the Zora Champion, although her father King Dorephan says that it is only on the condition that she returns safely.

Lead artist Hirohito Shinoda stated in development notes that he based her design off of a dolphin. Cinematic designer Naoki Mori said that Mipha's relationship with Link was intended to be different to his relationship with Princess Zelda, commenting that "it almost ended up being too intense. I tried to balance things by making her into a quieter person".

=== Daruk ===
Daruk (Note: Japanese: ダルケル, Hepburn: Darukeru) was the Goron Champion and pilot of Divine Beast Vah Rudania, the Divine Beast that takes the form of a lizard. Daruk's signature weapon is the Boulder Breaker. He is voiced by Joe Hernandez in English and Koji Takeda in Japanese. He is usually energetic and upbeat, and he becomes ferocious during battle and believes in Link's fighting capabilities, though he has a phobia of dogs due to being chased by them frequently in his youth. When Link defeats Fireblight Ganon, He grants Link "Daruk's Protection", which protects Link from attacks. He then takes aim on Calamity Ganon.

Daruk also appears in Hyrule Warriors: Age of Calamity. as a playable warrior. He has a fire-based moveset. Daruk plays a major role in the storyline as one of the four Champions.

Cinematic designer Naoki Mori stated that Daruk is reminiscent of Darunia from Ocarina of Time because he calls Link "little guy", which serves as a homage to Darunia calling him "brother". He designed him to have a straightforward nature like the other Gorons while being the elder spiritual leader of the Champions. Lead artist Hierohito Shinoda added that he wanted Daruk to feel like an experienced leader that anyone can count on, with his hair looking like armour. He also focused on his body shape to ensure that he was bulky and muscular.

=== Revali ===
Revali (Note: Japanese: リーバル, Hepburn: Rībaru) was the Rito Champion and pilot of Divine Beast Vah Medoh, a Divine Beast resembling a bird. He is voiced in English by Sean Chiplock and Noboru Yamaguchi in Japanese. Revali is skilled in aerial battles and has exceptional sight and archery skills. He initially believes himself to be superior to Link and resents him due to being given a lesser role than him in combating Calamity Ganon, but reluctantly changes his views after Link defeats Windblight Ganon, freeing his spirit in the process. Once he does, Revali grants Link "Revali's Gale,” a powerful vertical wind current that blows him into the air, making vertical travel much easier.

Revali also appears in Hyrule Warriors: Age of Calamity as a playable character. He has the ability to create updrafts that allow him to soar into the sky's.

In Creating a Champion, cinematic designer, Naoki Mori stated that the Champions were designed as a throwback to characters in earlier games. He thought it would be interesting to create a character that does not accept Link as a hero like the other Champions, but wanted to ensure that he was not disliked for his overconfidence. The lead artist of NPCs, Hirohito Shinoda, stated that Revali was the first Rito character to be created for the game and defined the other Rito designs. Various bird motifs were considered for his design, including swallows and woodpeckers, before the team chose birds of prey. Shinoda also stated that it took a lot of experimentation to create a character that sees Link as his rival, but is unable to be honest about it. He also appears in Hyrule Warriors: Age of Calamity as a playable character. VG247 reported that players lamented the absence of Revali's Gale in Tears of the Kingdom, describing it as the most useful of the four Champion abilities.

=== Urbosa ===
Urbosa (Note: Japanese: ウルボザ, Hepburn: Uruboza) was the Gerudo chief, Champion, and pilot of Divine Beast Vah Naboris. She is voiced by Elizabeth Maxwell in English and Rei Shimoda in Japanese. Urbosa is a strong and courageous leader who showcases care and concern for Princess Zelda's well-being, as she was good friends with Zelda's mother, the deceased Queen of Hyrule. Urbosa still feels bitter about her failure as a Champion one hundred years before. However, she is happy to be able to make up for her people's shame, as one of Ganon's previous incarnations was a Gerudo. She grants Link "Urbosa's Fury", a devastating electric attack that can strike enemies in a wide radius for massive damage.

She also appears in Hyrule Warriors: Age of Calamity as a playable character. She was generally well-regarded, as she was considered one of the best characters of 2017 by Paste Magazine and Destructoid.

== Sages ==
=== Sidon ===
Sidon (Note: Japanese: シド, Hepburn: Shido) is Mipha's younger brother and heir to the Zora throne, who is admired by the Zora for his strength and optimism. He is voiced by Jamie Mortellaro in English and Kosuke Onishi in Japanese. He aids Link in stopping Vah Ruta from flooding Zora's Domain and causing damage to the surrounding regions, as the Zoras, being weak to electricity, are unable to use the Shock Arrows needed to disable it. Sidon also helps Link win the support of the prejudiced Muzu by proving Mipha's love for him with the Zora Armor. A younger version of Sidon appears in the Memory "Champion Mipha's Song" during the Champion's Ballad DLC, and again in Hyrule Warriors: Age of Calamity. He also appears in Hyrule Warriors: Age of Calamity as a playable character.

In Tears of the Kingdom, Sidon assists Link in purifying Zora's Domain of sludge by entering the Water Temple and defeating Mucktorok. Subsequently, he becomes the Sage of Water and king of the Zora after Dorephan abdicates the throne. He and Link are now depicted in a statue in Zora's Domain, which depicts Link riding on Sidon and honors them saving Zora's Domain from Vah Ruta.

=== Yunobo ===
Yunobo (Note: Japanese: ユン坊, Hepburn: Yun-bō) is a young Goron and a descendant of Daruk. He is voiced by Joe Hernandez in English and Miyuki Kobori in Japanese. Despite being cowardly, Yunobo possesses Daruk's power of protection and the original Sage of Fire's rolling attack.

In Breath of the Wild, he helps Link enter Vah Rudania by acting as a cannonball to disable it.

Yunobo also appears in Hyrule Warriors: Age of Calamity as a playable character. He can eat special Rock Roasts to change the effects of his Protection when he attacks.

In Tears of the Kingdom, Yunobo became the president of the YunoboCo mining company prior to the Upheaval. During the Upheaval, he got mind controlled by Ganondorf, who used Phantom Ganon impersonating Zelda to manipulate him into mining the marbled rock, (which was created by Marbled Gohma and has negative effects on the Gorons who consume it) and consequently became a marbled rock lord. After Link broke the mask that controlled him, Yunobo accompanies Link to the Fire Temple and defeated Marbled Gohma to get rid of the marbled rocks. Later, he becomes the Sage of Fire, gaining the ability to create a spirit avatar who assists Link using powerful rolling attacks.

=== Tulin ===
Tulin (Note: Japanese: チューリ, Hepburn: Chūri) is the son of Teba and Saki. He is voiced by Cristina Vee in English and Natsuki Mori in Japanese.

Tulin initially made a minor appearance as a child in Breath of the Wild and returns in Tears of the Kingdom, where he helps Link traverse the Stormwind Ark and stop the blizzard threatening the Rito. Afterward, he becomes the Sage of Wind, gaining the ability to create a spirit avatar who assists Link by creating gusts of wind that allows him to quickly travel horizontal distances. GamesRadar reported that players reacted positively to the character, describing him as "adorable", particularly because the two feathers that hang from his Great Eagle Bow are a display of love for his parents.

He makes a brief appearance in one of the DLC quests in Hyrule Warriors: Age of Calamity.

=== Riju ===
Makeela Riju (Note: Japanese: ルージュ, Hepburn: Rūju) is the young chief of the Gerudo, who inherited the throne at a very young age. She is twelve years old in Breath of the Wild, and returns in Tears of the Kingdom as an older teenager. She is respected by the Gerudo despite her young age. Link wins her support by retrieving the Gerudo's treasured Thunder Helm from the Yiga Clan. Riju plays a major supporting role by helping Link board Divine Beast Vah Naboris, using the Thunder Helm to protect Link from Vah Naboris' lightning attacks while he injures its feet to immobilize and board it. In battle, Riju rides on a shield pulled by her favorite sand seal, Patricia.

Riju also appears in Hyrule Warriors: Age of Calamity as a playable character, where she displays lightning-based attacks.

In Tears of the Kingdom, Riju again plays a major role in the main quest, aiding Link in defending Kara Kara Bazaar and Gerudo Town from Gibdo attacks and accompanying him to the Lightning Temple. She later becomes the Sage of Lightning, gaining the ability to create a spirit avatar to aid Link in combat.

=== Mineru ===
Mineru (Note: Japanese: ミネル, Hepburn: Mineru) is a Zonai and Rauru's elder sister, who appears in Tears of the Kingdom. She is voiced by Heather Gonzalez in English. After Zelda is transported to the distant past, she meets Mineru and Rauru, who are the last two remaining Zonai. Mineru helps Zelda to return to her own time by explaining the power of the Secret Stones and the forbidden act of draconification; swallowing a stone to become an immortal dragon. She is the Sage of Spirit, which gives her the power to separate her spirit from her body. After the Sages' battle against the Ganondorf, she succumbs to her injuries and her spirit remains in the Purah Pad. In the present, Link encounters Mineru in the Depths and builds a Zonai mech to house her spirit before helping her recover her Secret Stone from the Spirit Temple.

== Other characters ==
=== Paya ===
Paya (Note: Japanese: パーヤ, Hepburn: Pāya) is a young Sheikah who first appears in Breath of the Wild. She is Impa's granddaughter and is encountered at Impa's house in Kakariko Village. Paya is a dutiful assistant to Impa and is typically found performing household duties during the day or praying to deities at night. She returns in Tears of the Kingdom, where she has become village elder following Impa's retirement. Paya has a quiet personality and is especially shy when interacting with Link, but her dialogue and diary entries show that she harbors a secret crush on him. VentureBeat highlighted that her interactions with Link in Breath of the Wild show an attraction towards him and reveal details about her character.

=== Purah ===
Purah (Note: Japanese: プルア, Hepburn: Purua) is a Sheikah researcher who first appears in Breath of the Wild. She is the director of the Hateno Tech Lab and helps Link to upgrade the Sheikah Slate. Her physical appearance is that of a small child, after having conducted research that caused her to age backwards. Despite her young appearance, she is described in Creating a Champion as being about 124 years old, older than her sister Impa. Alongside her research partner Robbie, she also appears as a young woman in Hyrule Warriors: Age of Calamity. Purah returns in Tears of the Kingdom as the head of Lookout Landing. Her renewed appearance as a young woman gained attention from players across social media upon the game's release. Nintendo Life reported that players were "enamoured" by her redesign, which spawned numerous works of fan art.

=== Robbie ===
Robbie (Note: Japanese: ロベリー, Hepburn: Roberī) is a Sheikah researcher and colleague of Purah, who first appears in Breath of the Wild. He manages the Akkala Ancient Tech Lab and researches ancient Guardian technology. After Link restores his machine Cherry, he trades Guardian parts for various items. He returns in Tears of the Kingdom, where he takes over the Hateno Ancient Tech Lab and works with Purah to develop the Purah Pad. He plays an integral role in the story by setting up the Purah Pad for Link to use at Lookout Landing and sending him on a quest into the Depths, which allows the player to unlock the Camera and the Hyrule Compendium. He also upgrades the Purah Pad with additional functions, including the Shrine Sensor, which can track nearby shrines, and the Travel Medallion, which sets a travel return point. He also appears in Hyrule Warriors: Age of Calamity as a playable character alongside Purah.

=== Josha ===
Josha (Note: Japanese: ジョシュア, Hepburn: Joshua) is a major supporting character who first appears in Tears of the Kingdom. She is voiced by Maya Tuttle in English. She is a young Sheikah researcher who developed her knowledge by researching the Depths. She works alongside Purah and Robbie at Lookout Landing and has a passion for cave exploration. As the Head of Depths Research, Josha plays a critical role in sending Link into the Depths as part of the main quest, which leads him to unlock the Camera and the Hyrule Compendium. Due to being unable to go down to the Depths herself, she asks Link to find evidence of an ancient race that she believes can be found there. Returning to her at Lookout Landing begins a quest that sends Link into the Depths to follow a trail of statues that lead to an old mine. Josha's request eventually leads him to battle Master Kohga, which unlocks Autobuild, one of Link's main abilities.

=== Master Kohga ===
Master Kohga (Note: Japanese: コーガ様, Hepburn: Kōga-sama) is the leader of the Yiga Clan, who first appears in Breath of the Wild. He appears as a boss in the main quest line, as Link fights him to obtain the Thunder Helm. He is lazy and egotistical, as he spends most of his time sleeping in the Yiga Clan's hideout, which is located in the desert through the Karusa Valley, while the clan goes after Link. When Link infiltrates the Yiga hideout to confront him, Kohga summons a spiked ball that rolls over him and sends him falling into the depths.

He also appears with the Yiga Clan in Hyrule Warriors: Age of Calamity, and eventually becomes a playable character.

Kohga returns in Tears of the Kingdom, which reveals he survived following his supposed death in Breath of the Wild, and appears as a reoccurring boss in the Depths. His first boss fight is part of the main quest and allows the player to unlock the Autobuild ability. He also appears in Super Smash Bros. Ultimate as a spirit. Jacob Linden, writing for The Escapist, described the Kohga boss quest line as "utter joy" and praised the character's expressive animation and boss fights.

=== Hestu ===
Hestu (Note: Japanese: ボックリン, Hepburn: Bokkurin) is a large, music-loving Korok who first appears in Breath of the Wild. He is first encountered near Kakariko Village, where Link must retrieve his stolen maracas. In both Breath of the Wild and Tears of the Kingdom, he upgrades Link's weapon inventory slots using collected Korok Seeds. In both games, collecting all Korok Seeds will reward the player with "Hestu's Gift", which is actually golden poop. Allegra Frank of Polygon described Hestu as the "true star" of Breath of the Wild, commenting that he is a familiar and comforting presence in the game's enormous world and highlighting that he is a fan favorite amongst many players, who responded positively to his appearance. Hidemaro Fujibayashi confirmed that the Korok Seeds are actually Korok poop, stating that the development team "thought it would be funny to make that a big joke".

Hestu also appears as a playable character in Hyrule Warriors: Age of Calamity.

=== Kass ===
Kass (Note: Japanese: カッシーワ, Hepburn: Kasshīwa) is a Rito bard who first appears in Breath of the Wild. He plays a major supporting role in guiding Link throughout his adventure by playing distinctive tunes on his accordion to reveal hidden shrines. Kass also guides Link throughout the Champion's Ballad DLC, as his songs provide the clues to its shrines. IGN highlighted that Kass is noticeably absent from Tears of the Kingdom despite being a beloved character amongst fans. Rebekah Valentine considered it strange that he is not mentioned by name and that fans hoped that he would return as DLC. Writing for VG247, Oisin Kuhnke considered Kass to be an "incredibly iconic character from Breath of the Wild", as his soothing accordion can be heard all over Hyrule.

=== Teba ===
Teba (Note: Japanese: テバ, Hepburn: Teba) is a Rito archer known for his great skill in combat, as well as his focus and temper. He is voiced by Sean Chiplock in English and Takuya Masumoto in Japanese. With the Rito unable to fly freely for fear of getting shot down by Vah Medoh, Teba intends to attack the Divine Beast by himself while disregarding the potential consequences. Teba aids Link in the attack on Vah Medoh, drawing its attention so Link can disable it and climb aboard. In Tears of the Kingdom, he becomes the new leader of the Rito following Kaneli's retirement.

He also appears in Hyrule Warriors: Age of Calamity as a playable character.

=== King Rauru ===
King Rauru (Note: Japanese: ラウル, Hepburn: Rauru) is a Zonai who appears in Tears of the Kingdom as a major supporting character. He is voiced by Chris Hackney in English and Riki Kagami in Japanese. At the beginning of the game, he saves Link after Ganondorf attacks him with Gloom beneath Hyrule Castle by attaching his own arm, which gives him various abilities. His name references Rauru, the Sage of Light in Ocarina of Time. In the game's story, Zelda meets him in the distant past, where he is revealed to have been the king of Hyrule, founding it alongside his wife Sonia. Rauru plays a critical role in the Imprisoning War where he battles against Ganondorf's army. When Ganondorf betrays Rauru and kills Sonia to transform himself into the Demon King using the power of her Secret Stone, Rauru gathers the Sages to defeat him, ultimately sacrificing himself to seal him away. Cody Perez, writing for Destructoid, considered Rauru to be one of the most important characters in the game, as he is the source of Link's arm and plays an integral role in battling Ganondorf. Hope Bellingham of GamesRadar noted that many players had reacted positively to the character's design.

=== Sonia ===
Queen Sonia (Note: Japanese: ソニア, Hepburn: Sonia) is a major supporting character who appears in Tears of the Kingdom. She is voiced by Cherami Leigh in English and Yūko Kaida in Japanese. She is Rauru's wife and the first queen of Hyrule. She appears in the memories of the Dragon's Tears, which are found at geoglyphs and reveal Hyrule's distant past. Sonia possesses the power to manipulate time and, being the ancestor of Zelda, is the origin of her power alongside Rauru. After Zelda is transported through time to Hyrule's distant past, she meets Sonia and Rauru, who try to help her understand her newfound power and return to her own time. Sonia recognizes Zelda's strength and they develop a close connection. Although Ganondorf swears an oath of peace to the Zonai, he betrays them to gain power over Hyrule. He then kills Sonia, taking her Secret Stone to transform himself into the Demon King. Her death motivates Zelda and Rauru to defeat Ganondorf.

=== Hudson ===
Hudson (Note: Japanese: エノキダ, Hepburn: Enokida) is a builder who first appears in Breath of the Wild. Link can aid Hudson as he works to found a new settlement called Tarrey Town in a side quest that involves various minor characters across Hyrule. In Tears of the Kingdom, Link again encounters Hudson and his Gerudo wife Rhondson at Tarrey Town. They own Hudson Construction, a building company known throughout Hyrule. Link meets their young daughter Mattison, who embarks on her own journey to reach Gerudo Town. Caleb Pistoni, writing for Paste, considered that the side quest to help Hudson build Tarrey Town was a highlight of Breath of the Wild and praised the story continuity in Tears of the Kingdom, which shows the existing characters thriving and rebuilding Hyrule after its destruction. After helping Mattison achieve independence, Link can purchase a plot of land from Rhondson, giving him the opportunity to build his own home.

== Reception ==
Critical reception to the characters from both games has been generally positive. Hope Pisoni of Endless Mode praised the NPCs seen in Tarrey Town, one of the locations of Hyrule, describing the NPCs as thriving while "pursuing ambitions, developing skills, and rebuilding Hyrule's communities." She highlighted the romantic relationship between characters Hudson, a Hylian man, and Rhondson, a Gerudo woman, which starts in Breath of the Wild and blossoms into a marriage with a daughter by the start of Tears of the Kingdom. Sam Prell of GamesRadar+ desired to see the Champions as playable fighters in the Super Smash Bros. series. Urbosa, the Gerudo Champion, received much attention and was hailed as one of the best characters of 2017 by Paste. VG247 noted the disappointment from fans at the absence of Kass, a singing Rito whose songs give Link clues to secrets found in the game's world. Despite warm reception to many of the characters, the voice acting has been seen as a weak point for many of the voiced characters.

The attractiveness of many of the characters has been subject to much fan discussion. Sidon became a fan favorite, becoming the subject of memes and fan art that highlight his sex appeal. Ana Diaz of Polygon commented at the disappointment of fans upon the reveal that Sidon is engaged, joking how TikTok is "filled with dozens of people lamenting the loss of Hyrule's most eligible bachelor." Purah, a 117-year-old Sheikah scientist in the body of a seven-year-old following an experiment gone awry before the start of Breath of the Wild, became the subject of discussion and fan art following her aged-up appearance in Tears of the Kingdom. Madeline Carpou of The Mary Sue describes her redesign as a "glow-up" and complimented her design for aging her character instead of relying on "creepy age tropes", referencing a media trope of establishing a character with a youthful appearance as being of age of consent. VG247 notes that Pornhub saw a 42,257% uptick of searches for Purah. Ganondorf received the attention of fans, with several memes and social media posts commenting on his new design. Darryn Bonthuys of GameSpot describes Ganondorf as a thirst trap and notes social media responses to design.
