= Urbosa =

Character in The Legend of Zelda game series

- The Legend of Zelda character
- Urbosa, as she appears in The Legend of Zelda: Breath of the Wild
- First game: The Legend of Zelda: Breath of the Wild (2017)
- Designed by: Naoki Mori; Hirohito Shinoda
- Voiced by: EN: Elizabeth Maxwell; JA: Rei Shimoda

In-universe information
- Race: Gerudo
- Nationality: Hyrulean

Urbosa (Japanese: ウルボザ, Hepburn: Uruboza) is a fictional character from Nintendo's The Legend of Zelda series. She first appeared as one of the major characters in The Legend of Zelda: Breath of the Wild, where she is the leader of the Gerudo and one of the four Champions who helped Princess Zelda and Link protect Hyrule from Calamity Ganon, losing her life in the process. She also appears in the hack-and-slash video game Hyrule Warriors: Age of Calamity as a playable character.

Within the game, Urbosa is the pilot of Divine Beast Vah Naboris, one of the four Divine Beasts that the Champions used to protect Hyrule from Calamity Ganon. Like the other Champions, Urbosa has a unique skill that is used in gameplay, which is the ability to control the power of lightning. She has been positively received by both fans and critics due to her heroic, wise, and charismatic character. She was identified as both a fan favorite and a standout character in the cast, with multiple critics expressing a desire to see her in more games, such as the Super Smash Bros. series and her own game.

== Concept and creation ==
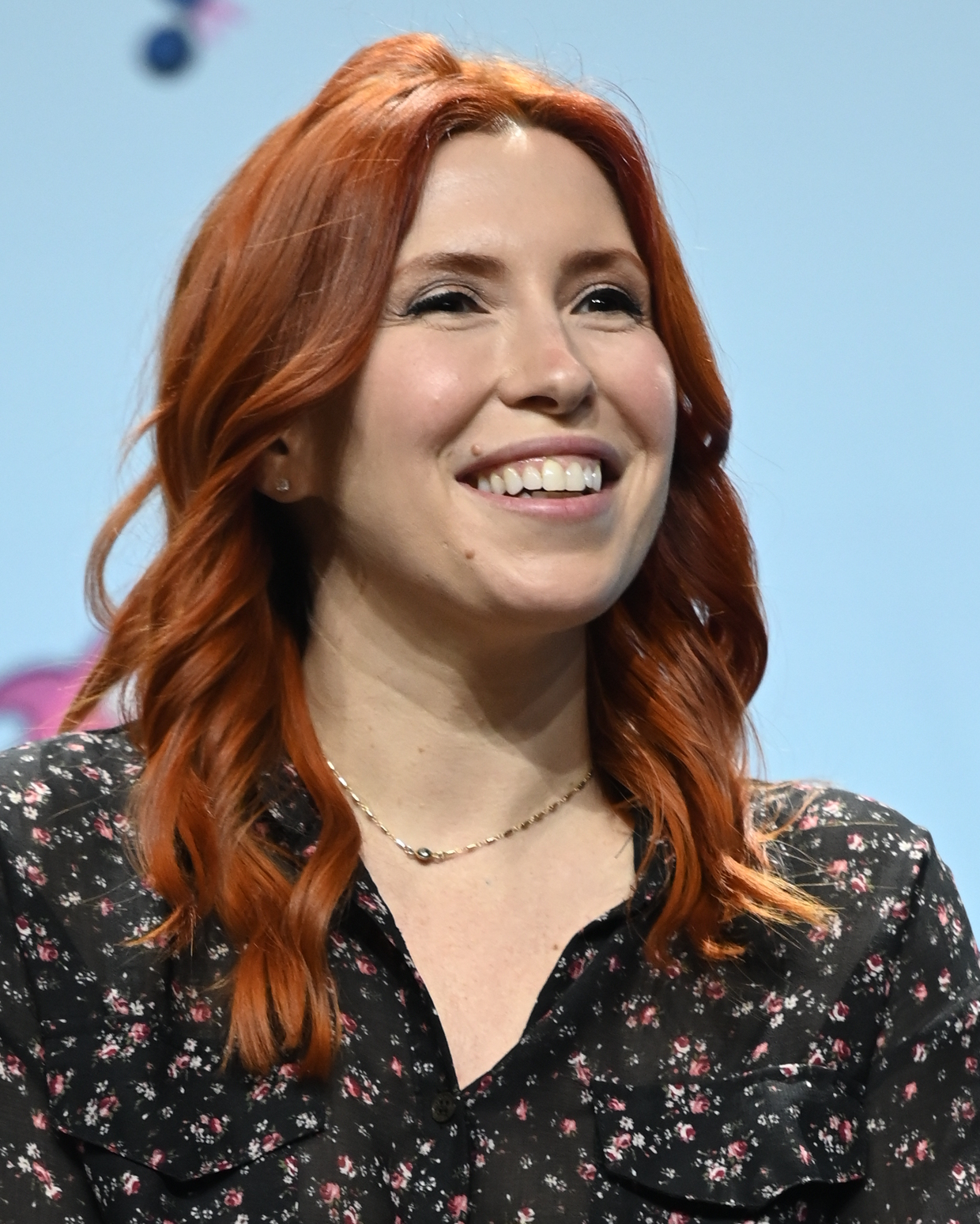
Elizabeth Maxwell is Urbosa's English voice actress.

Urbosa was created for The Legend of Zelda: Breath of the Wild. She was designed to have a "more feminine, motherly appearance" than other Gerudos, and was also "slightly less muscular" than other Gerudos, "possessing both the strength of a warrior and a mother". Cinematic designer Naoki Mori designed a scene where Urbosa saves Princess Zelda from the Yiga and serves as her "spiritual mother", going on to describe her as kind, relaxed, and sassy. She was also written as wanting to take responsibility for Ganondorf's rise to power in The Legend of Zelda: Ocarina of Time, which Mori did as part of expanding the "expansive nature" and "rich history" of the series. Lead NPC artist Hirohito Shinoda designed her outfit with the idea of "a person an ordinary Gerudo would look up to". Urbosa's name was the first to be finalized during the development of Breath of the Wild.

Urbosa is the Chief of the Gerudo and a fierce leader, as well as the pilot of the Divine Beast of lightning, Vah Naboris. She has the ability to control the power of lightning. Urbosa is related to Riju, the current Gerudo Chief and her direct descendant, who appears in Breath of the Wild. Like the other Champions, Urbosa has a unique skill that the player uses during gameplay in Breath of the Wild. As a member of the Gerudo race, Urbosa was designed with common traits of her people. She has dark skin, red hair, green eyes, and blue lips. She wears a multicolored golden breastplate with shoulder guards and a gold belt with a blue skirt, symbolizing that she is one of the Champions of Hyrule. She also wears green high-heels and several gold jewels. Hyrule Warriors: Age of Calamity depicts Urbosa at a point in the storyline when she serves as Gerudo Chief before being named Gerudo Champion. She wears the Chief's crown, which is identical to the one Riju wears as Chief, and a black skirt with the Gerudo symbol on it. She keeps her signature weapon, the Scimitar of the Seven, and her Daybreaker shield holstered to the back of her body. Urbosa has been noted for her tall stature and muscular build, which are common traits of the Gerudo.

In both Breath of the Wild and Hyrule Warriors: Age of Calamity, Urbosa is voiced in Japanese by Rei Shimoda and in English by Elizabeth Maxwell.

== Appearances ==
=== Breath of the Wild ===
Urbosa appears in Breath of the Wild as one of four Champions, alongside Mipha, Revali, and Daruk, who are tasked with aiding Princess Zelda and Link in protecting Hyrule from Calamity Ganon. In the game's backstory, she commands Vah Naboris, one of the four Divine Beasts, but Calamity Ganon manages to take control of the Divine Beasts, resulting in her death and the death of the other Champions as Link is put in a 100-year slumber. After Link awakens, he can go to Vah Naboris to try to tame it, and there he meets the spirit of Urbosa, who helps guide him in the innards of the Divine Beast.

Urbosa plays a major role in the backstory of Breath of the Wild, which is revealed to the player through cutscenes and Urbosa's diary entries. Urbosa is shown to have had a special connection with Zelda's mother, the Queen of Hyrule; this friendship is reflected in the support that she offers to Zelda. Urbosa is shown to be a strong supporter of the relationship between Link and Zelda and plays an active role in bringing them closer together. Urbosa's supportive role continues after her death, as her spirit appears to encourage Link to destroy Calamity Ganon.

=== Age of Calamity ===
Urbosa appears in Hyrule Warriors: Age of Calamity as a playable character. The game is a prequel set 100 years before Breath of the Wild in an alternate timeline created after Terrako, a small Guardian that Zelda built in her childhood, time travels into the past to prevent Hyrule's fate in the Breath of the Wild timeline. Urbosa arrives home to Gerudo Town just as Master Kohga, leader of the Yiga Clan, is about to strike down Zelda while disguised as Urbosa, only to be electrocuted. Urbosa, due to her close friendship with Zelda, agrees to pilot Vah Naboris against the Calamity. After Zelda and Link gather the other Champions, they travel to Korok Forest to recover the Master Sword. After recovering the Master Sword, Zelda voices her concern about Link changing after getting the sword, but Urbosa assures her that Link is still himself. Urbosa is then dubbed Gerudo Champion and returns to pilot Vah Naboris and battles both the Yiga and the Calamity.

After Calamity Ganon awakens, Urbosa is cut off from the other Champions and Hyrule Castle when Ganon shuts down the Sheikah Towers' teleportation ability, and soon finds herself fighting a stronger Thunderblight Ganon sent to take over Vah Naboris. Before she can be killed by the Blight Ganon like in the original timeline, she is saved by Riju and Patricia, who were summoned from the future by Terrako to protect her, until Link arrives to help them destroy Thunderblight Ganon. Joined by the other Champions and their Divine Beasts after they are saved by the future Champions, they save the Hyrulean Army from Calamity Ganon, and then defend the Great Plateau. After Purah summons the Gerudo warrior women to bolster the Hyrulean Army with the Rito, Gorons, and Zoras, they reclaim Hyrule Castle from the Calamity, ultimately victorious.

=== Other appearances ===
Urbosa appears in Super Smash Bros. Ultimate as a Spirit. For the release of Breath of the Wild, Nintendo released an Amiibo of Urbosa. It was later reprinted for the launch of Hyrule Warriors: Age of Calamity.

== Reception ==
Urbosa has received a generally positive reception, identified as both a fan favorite and a standout character in Breath of the Wild. Holly Green of Paste Magazine and Rich Meister of Destructoid held her as one of their favorite characters of 2017. She has been regarded as one of the best characters in Breath of the Wild by multiple sources, including TheGamer and Game Informer. Destructoid contributor Pixie the Fairy called her a recent favorite. Pixie was "awed" by her when they played Breath of the Wild, citing how she is both "heroic and fearsome" and "gentle, perceptive and wise". Hussain Almahr of Vice called her "amazing" while feeling that Arabic themes in the Gerudo were not represented adequately in the game.

Multiple critics expressed a desire to see her character included in other games. Urbosa was a popular choice for a desired newcomer in Super Smash Bros. Ultimate, either as a group with the other Champions or on her own. In her review of Hyrule Warriors: Age Of Calamity for Kotaku, Ash Parrish singled out the option to play as Urbosa to be the singular highlight of the game for her. TheGamer writer Cian Maher also enjoyed being able to play as Urbosa, adding that he wanted to see her get her own game. He discusses how much he enjoyed the Gerudo elements in the series, and regarded Urbosa as one of his favorite characters in The Legend of Zelda series. Game Informer writer Liana Ruppert felt favorably about Urbosa, expressing hope that Urbosa would appear more in the future.

== See also ==
- Characters of The Legend of Zelda
