= Patricia Summersett =

American-Canadian actress

- Summersett at Rose City Comic Con in 2026
- Born: March 15, 1982 (age 44); L'Anse, Michigan
- Education: Concordia University (BFA); Royal Central School of Speech and Drama (MA)
- Occupation: Actress
- Years active: 2005–present
- Website: Official website

Patricia Summersett (born March 15, 1982) is an American-Canadian actress known for voicing Princess Zelda in The Legend of Zelda: Breath of the Wild, Hyrule Warriors: Age of Calamity,The Legend of Zelda: Tears of the Kingdom, and Hyrule Warriors: Age of Imprisonment.

Alongside her voice work, Summersett has also appeared on television and film, most notably in Street Legal as Maeve, in The Saver as Rachel, and in Three Pines as recurring character Angela Blake.

== Life and career ==
Summersett has appeared in the Darren Aronofsky psychological horror mother!, in series: CBC's Bellevue starring Anna Paquin, CTV's The Disappearance with Peter Coyote, Go90's Lost Generation with Katie Findlay and scored by Tony-winning Duncan Sheik, and NBC's The Bold Type on Free Form. She also played a lead in the indie feature Maz by festival-winning filmmaker Federico Hidalgo. Notable past roles include recurring characters in Ron Moore's Helix s2 as well as 19-2 (Bravo/CTV). She was also the official “On set Smurf” representing Smurfette, Vexy and Clumsy as the reference voice and puppeteer for the making of Sony's The Smurfs 2.

== Education ==
She holds a BFA in theatre performance from Concordia University and a master's in classical acting from the Royal Central School of Speech and Drama. She has also studied acting at Moscow Art Theatre and National Theatre Conservatory. Before attending drama school, she trained for years as a competitive ice dancer, and held the title of Quebec Sectional Champion.

== Video games ==
Summersett was revealed as the first official English voice of Princess Zelda in Nintendo's thirty-year The Legend of Zelda franchise with her work in The Legend of Zelda: Breath of the Wild, and its sequel The Legend of Zelda: Tears of the Kingdom. She has voiced many games from indie to AAA and provided full performance capture for two assassins in Ubisoft's Assassin's Creed series. Within Tom Clancy's Rainbow Six: Siege, the character she voices is Ash, a female FBI operator working for Team Rainbow. She voiced Ash in Arknights as well.

== Theatre ==
Patricia has performed in theaters across Canada, the U.S. and the UK. She has been nominated for three META/MECCA (Montreal English Theatre/Critics Circle Awards) for “Best Lead Actress” playing the roles Rosalind in As You Like it and Jacqueline in Trench Patterns (a captain with PTSD). She has also been featured in Equus, Pinter plays and as the title role in Ibsen's Hedda Gabler. She was last seen in the Toronto's 2016 Next Stage Festival, performing the Fringe hit Blood Wild by Paul Van Dyck.

== Personal life ==
She grew up in L'Anse, Michigan. In addition to her acting career, she is a songwriter and singer for the band Summersett, and was a competitive ice dancer representing Quebec in 2002 as senior Quebec Sectional Champion with former partner Simon Roberge. She has three sisters: Annette Summersett (born June 1980), Kathryn Summersett (born June 1985) and Jane Summersett, all artists, who perform music together.

In 2017, Patricia co-founded a charity called GeekU.P.

She is currently based in Montreal and Los Angeles.

== Filmography ==
=== Voice acting ===
==== Film ====
Year	Title	Role	Notes	Source
2013	The Smurfs 2	Smurf Voice #2	Off-camera Voice	
2015	The Death of Kao-Kuk	Actress		
2016	Darwin	Mother	Voice	

==== Television ====
Year	Title	Role	Notes	Source
2017	Level Up Norge	Princess Zelda (voice)	Season 7, Episode 89	
2018	Garo: Vanishing Line	Additional Voices (voice)	Season 1, Episode 21	
2019	Camp Camp	Ainsley (voice)		

==== Video games ====
Year	Title	Role	Notes	Source
2007	Beowulf: The Game	Grendel's Mother		
2008	Suikoden Tierkreis	Diadora / Servillah		
2010	Need for Speed: Hot Pursuit	Narrator		
2014	Assassin's Creed: Rogue	Hope Jensen		
2015	Assassin's Creed: Syndicate	Galina Voronina		
2015	Rainbow Six: Siege	Ash		
2016	Far Cry Primal	Wenja		
2016	Deus Ex: Mankind Divided	Additional Voices		
2017	For Honor	Knight Warden / Warmonger		
2017	The Legend of Zelda: Breath of the Wild	Princess Zelda		
2018	Dungeon Hunter Champions	Player		
2018	Omensight	General Draga / Witch		
2019	Tom Clancy's Ghost Recon Breakpoint	Paula Madera		
2019	Tom Clancy's Ghost Recon Breakpoint	Ash	Operation Amber Sky (DLC)	
2020	Guardian Tales	Bianca		
2020	Hyrule Warriors: Age of Calamity	Princess Zelda		
2021	Arknights	Ash		
2023	The Legend of Zelda: Tears of the Kingdom	Princess Zelda		
2023	Deceive Inc.	Ace / Olivia		
2023	Assassin's Creed Nexus VR	Additional Voices		
2024	SaGa: Emerald Beyond	Various Characters		
2024	Star Wars Outlaws	Zyssyk		
2025	Hell Is Us	Tania		
2025	Hyrule Warriors: Age of Imprisonment	Princess Zelda		

=== Live-action ===
==== Film ====
Year	Title	Role	Notes	Source
2013	The Jogger	Girlfriend	Short	
2013	Gingerbread House	Girlfriend	Short	
2015	The Saver	Rachel		
2016	Dear Mr. President	Police Spokeswoman	Short	
2016	I'm Coming Over	—N/a	Composer, Producer, Writer	
2017	Mother!	Consoler		
2018	Fareed	Mrs. Markell	Short	
2018	Maz	Deb Mazenet		
2019	The Great Traveller	Berenice		
2019	It's Alive!	Jenks	Short	

==== Television ====
Year	Title	Role	Notes	Source
2009	Emma	Dancer	TV Mini-series, Season 1, Episode 3	
2014	Sex & Ethnicity	Carole	Season 1, Episodes 1 & 8	
2014	19-2	Dr. Zoé	Season 1, Episodes 4 & 5	
2015	Helix	Lt. Commander Winger	Season 2, Episodes 1, 8, 9, 10, 11 & 12	
2015	Fatal Vows	Helen	Season 4, Episode 12	
2016	Real Detective	Merrie Cameron	Season 1, Episode 8	
2017	Lost Generation	Detective Bendel	Season 1, Episodes 1 & 10	
2017	The Bold Type	Dr. Elysa Hendricks	Season 1, Episode 6	
2017	Bellevue	Nikki Ryder	Season 1, Episode 1	
2017	The Disappearance	Anne-Marie Duval	Season 1, Episode 2	
2018	Broken Trust	Kelly	TV Mini-series, Season 1, Episode 8	
2018	The Truth About the Harry Quebert Affair	Reporter #1	TV Mini-series, Season 1, Episode 1	
2018	The Detectives	Cathy	Season 2, Episode 4	
2019	Street Legal	Maeve	1 episode	
2022	Transplant	Sandra Parker	1 episode	
2022	Three Pines	Angela Blake	4 episodes	
2024	Star Trek: Discovery	Tahal	1 episode	

== Other sources ==
- Patricia Summersett - Patricia Summersett on Dean Panaro Talent
- Patricia Summersett - Patricia Summersett on Glenn Talent Management
- Patricia Summersett answers YOUR questions! (Voice of Princess Zelda) - YouTube
- Patricia Summersett Video Game samples - YouTube
- Episode 10 – Patricia Summersett - The Spirit Bros Podcast
