= Purah =

Character in The Legend of Zelda game series

- The Legend of Zelda character
- Purah's appearance in Breath of the Wild (right) and in Tears of the Kingdom (left)
- First game: The Legend of Zelda: Breath of the Wild (2017)
- Voiced by: EN: Kate Higgins; JA: Ayano Shibuya

In-universe information
- Race: Sheikah
- Nationality: Hyrulean

Purah (Japanese: プルア, Hepburn: Purua) is a character in Nintendo's The Legend of Zelda series. She originally appeared in The Legend of Zelda: Breath of the Wild, where despite being elderly she appears as a young girl due to a science mishap. A young adult version of Purah is depicted in Hyrule Warriors: Age of Calamity, which is set 100 years before Breath of the Wild. She appears as this age once again in The Legend of Zelda: Tears of the Kingdom, having aged herself up since Breath of the Wild. In Japanese, she is voiced by Ayano Shibuya, while in English she is voiced by Kate Higgins.

Purah's appearance in Tears of the Kingdom received significant praise, with several media outlets voicing approval of her redesign in comparison to her child-like appearance in Breath of the Wild. Critics voiced approval for her attractiveness in this new iteration, while, fan-produced sexualized content and searches for such saw a large uptick as reported by multiple outlets. Additional praise was given for the character's expanded role in Tears of the Kingdom, and how she was an integral part of the game's story and a driving force for its narrative. She has also been analyzed as an example of the mad scientist archetype, and the Zelda series' positive portrayal of strong, older women.

== Conception and design ==
Purah was created for The Legend of Zelda: Breath of the Wild, and is a member of the Sheikah clan in the game. Lead artist Hirohito Shindoa developed this clan, a technologically advanced culture that became oppressed by the local kingdom, around the concept of a "hidden village away from the eyes of the world". Unified in appearance by their completely white hair, the clan members also have outfits with a "Japanese aesthetic" to differentiate them from other characters. Their hats, accessories and poses help differentiate members of the clan from one another. While initial designs intended to portray her as "languid and unenergetic", built around the theme of a "punk rock girl", Purah's finalized concept was built around a magical girl archetype, and made to resemble a young child due to a botched experiment to reduce her age and motivated by wanting money for her research.

Purah's outfit changed several times during development, with her "punk rocker" concept using heavy eyeliner to illustrate she was "not just some kid", while she wore a large purse on her midsection, and an oversized collar around her neck from before she transformed herself into a child-like appearance. Of these elements only the eye makeup remained, as she was given a cheerful and strong personality instead. While her original outfit was meant to resemble another notable member of the clan, Robbie, it was changed to a dress with a frilled interior while utilizing chopsticks to hold up her hair in a topknot. Though she wears ornate red glasses, she was given a set of gold goggles as well, meant to be shaped like a butterfly.

In Hyrule Warriors: Age of Calamity, a game set prior to the events of Breath of the Wild, she was portrayed as a woman in her twenties, now wearing a long beige coat and a black skirt. In The Legend of Zelda: Tears of the Kingdom, a sequel to Breath of the Wild, she is portrayed as a mature woman, now significantly taller and wearing a dress with a tight slit, and red stockings and high heels, while a set of blue gloves cover her hands. Her hair now frames her face, meant to give her a more adult appearance.

== Appearances ==
Purah first appears in The Legend of Zelda: Breath of the Wild as a character who assists the protagonist, Link, in his quest to save Hyrule and Princess Zelda from Calamity Ganon. Link, who spent the past 100 years recovering from his injuries, discovers that Purah, who was an elderly woman at the time, recently de-aged her body into that of a child due to a scientific mishap. She is one of only three Sheikah who were alive during the Calamity 100 years ago, alongside Impa and Robbie. She helps Link by improving his Sheikah Slate through upgrading its abilities.

In Hyrule Warriors: Age of Calamity, Purah initially appears as a non-playable character before being added as a playable character in downloadable content, where she forms a single unit with Robbie. In this game, set in an alternate timeline around the Great Calamity, she helps train the Champions and fine-tune the Divine Beasts, Sheikah-produced mecha intended for use against Calamity Ganon. With her help, the Sheikah transport the Champions and their allies to the final battle against Ganon, averting the Calamity.

Purah later appears in The Legend of Zelda: Tears of the Kingdom, a sequel to Breath of the Wild set some years later. In this game, Purah is assisting in rebuilding Hyrule, and has also managed to age herself up into an adult body. Providing Link with a paraglider, she helps him to explore the game's dungeons, acting as the central quest giver in the game and providing several side quests for Link.

In all appearances, Purah is voiced in English by Kate Higgins, and by Ayano Shibuya in Japanese.

== Critical reception ==
The character has received generally positive reception, particularly for her Tears of the Kingdom incarnation. Madeline Carpou of The Mary Sue praised Purah's redesign as "the best thing they could have done", noting its deviation from a particular trope often found in media in which a childlike character is actually supposed to be a "mature" adult, and praising her sex appeal. She noted that while there was no real explanation given in the game's narrative, she appreciated it nonetheless and questioned the younger version's presence in the previous game. Ana Diaz of Polygon described Purah's "amazing" redesign as an improvement over her previous childlike appearance, adding that while she didn't do anything "particularly sexy" in Tears of the Kingdom, it resulted in a large generation of fanmade content on social media. Meanwhile, Japanese website Game*Spark observed how some players would utilize Tears of the Kingdom's in-game mechanics to take Purah on "dates", praising their ingenuity.

The large amount of fanmade content upon Tears's release also drew response, with Iain Harris of GamesRadar+ describing her as a "mommy" archetype and stating that the large amount of it that sexualized her resulted in "a telling-off from two of my bosses". VG247's Oisin Kuhnke stated that despite an adult redesign for Purah first appearing in Hyrule Warriors, this iteration brought more exposure and helped make the game feel "directly targeted at NSFW content lovers". Tom Chapman of GGRecon expressed similar sentiment, stating that despite her "bundling introduction and goofy glasses" she had become a viral sensation, and compared the reaction to that for Resident Evil's Lady Dimitrescu, Pornographic content website Pornhub reported a 42,257% rise in searches related to the character, a number Kuhnke felt was "unsettlingly high" but also reflected her popularity in the game.

Others discussed her character's significance in the series' narrative. Jared Carvalho of Game Rant singled out Purah's role in Tears of the Kingdom in praising the game's deeper involvement of supporting characters whose roles prior often consisted of brief interactions with the protagonist. He noted Purah's impact on the narrative that included setting up the final confrontation with main villain Ganondorf, in addition to doing the "heavy lifting" of "acting as a leading figure in Hyrule" in the absence of Princess Zelda, which he felt enhanced the game's player experience and worldbuilding. Bárbara Gimeno of 3DJuegos cited Purah as an example of a recurring theme of strong older women in Nintendo titles, stating that with her humor and science she challenged character archetypes, and emphasized the importance of her role in Tears of the Kingdom. She further added in regards to her adult character design her cute lab coat and crooked glasses helped emphasize the "technical knowledge, research, and innovation" aspect of wisdom.

In academic study of the Zelda series, Will Rawleigh in the book The Legend of Zelda and Philosophy: Lenses of Truth cited Purah as an example of how scientists in the Zelda franchise are often portrayed as eccentric and have "devil-may-care" attitudes. He argued though that while she was portrayed as willing to experiment on herself and illustrated with less constraint, she did not fit a mad scientist narrative archetype. Instead, alongside Robbie and other characters many of her achievements were shown as vital to the series' world, and pointed to her taking on a leadership role not for power but for understanding. Rawleight also pointed to her willingness to experiment on herself over others as showing ethical restraint, and that her own in-game diary entries illustrated her understanding of social contact to further her own successes.
