= Elizabeth Maxwell =

American voice actress

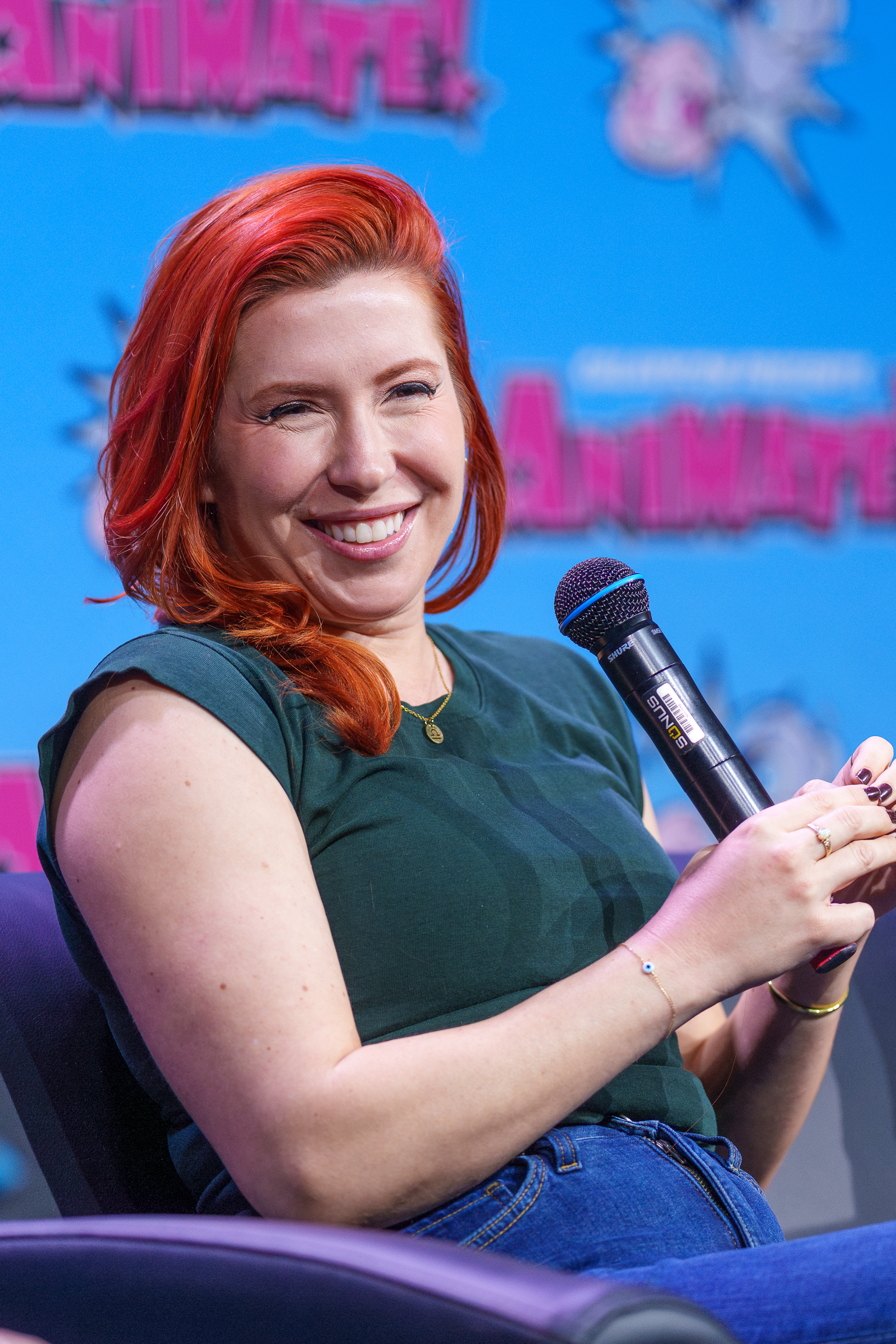
- Maxwell at Animate! Raleigh in 2026
- Born: Paradise, California, U.S.
- Occupation: Voice actress
- Years active: 2004–present

Elizabeth Maxwell is an American voice actress. She is best known for her roles as Ymir in Attack on Titan, Motoko Kusanagi in Ghost in the Shell Arise, Winter Schnee in RWBY, Nemuri Kayama/Midnight in My Hero Academia, Sae Niijima in Persona 5, Cordelia Gallo in Gosick, Urbosa & Riju in The Legend of Zelda: Breath of the Wild and The Legend of Zelda: Tears of the Kingdom, Rosaria in Genshin Impact, Caulifla in Dragon Ball Super, Nikki in Camp Camp and Hollyberry Cookie and more cookies in Cookie Run: Kingdom

== Career ==
After growing up in Northern California, Maxwell moved to Los Angeles to study theater at Chapman University. Maxwell began her acting career in short web films, the first being, Living Like Fire (2004). She then moved on to bigger projects like 201 Hells (2008), which was her debut anime dub. She would later appear as Abby in the television show Criminal Minds. In her late twenties she relocated from Los Angeles to Austin, Texas, where she was suggested to seek more voiceover roles. She joined Funimation and got a breakout role in 2013 with Ymir in Attack on Titan and the parody show Attack on Titan: Junior High in 2015.

== Filmography ==
=== Anime ===
Year	Title	Role	Notes	Source
2014	Attack on Titan	Ymir	Also season 2-3	
2014	Ghost in the Shell: Arise	Motoko Kusanagi		
2015	One Piece	Shakky	Funimation dub	
2015	Noragami	Bishamon	Also season 2	
2015	Soul Eater Not!	Shaula Gorgon		
2016	Maken Ki	Kodama Himegami	Season 2	
2016	Overlord	Albedo		
2016	My Hero Academia	Nemuri Kayama/Midnight		
2017	Ai no Kusabi	Mimea		
2017	Garo: Crimson Moon	Izumi Shikibu		
2017	Kancolle	Nagato		
2017	New Game!	Christina Wako Yamato	season 2	
2017	Code Geass: Akito the Exiled	Ayano Kosaka		
2017	Anime Gataris	Miko Koenji		
2017	Hina Logic	Yuko Morigaya		
2017	Sakura Quest	Sanae Kozuki		
2017	Gosick	Cordelia Gallo		
2017	Seven Mortal Sins	Belial		
2018	Yamada-kun and the Seven Witches	Leona Miyamura		
2018	Dragon Ball Super	Caulifla		
2019	Azur Lane	Amagi		
2019	Fruits Basket	Arisa Uotani		
2019	Fire Force	Lisa Isaribi		
2020	Persona 5: The Animation	Sae Niijima		
2020	Plunderer	Lynn May		
2020	SK8 the Infinity	Kiriko Kamata		
2020	Altered Carbon: Resleeved	"Gena" / Reileen Kawahara		
2021	Shadows House	Barbie/Barbara		
2021	SSSS.Dynazenon	Inamoto		
2021	Mieruko-chan	Tohko		
2022	Girls' Frontline	Executioner		
2022	The Genius Prince's Guide to Raising a Nation Out of Debt	Nanaki Ralei		
2022	Girlfriend, Girlfriend	Shino Kiryū		
2022	RWBY: Ice Queendom	Winter Schnee, Silly Weiss (eps 7-11), Young Weiss Schnee (ep11)		
2023	Mobile Suit Gundam: The Witch from Mercury	Prospera		

=== Films ===
Year	Title	Role	Notes	Source
2017	Black Butler: Book of the Atlantic	Frances Midford		
2019	Code Geass: Lelouch of Re;surrection	Shamna		

=== Video games ===
List of voice performances in video games
Year	Title	Role	Notes	Source
2008	Wizard101	Zaltanna the Mirrormask		
2011	DC Universe Online	Athena		
2012	Pirate101	Wilhelmina / Various		
2013	Strife	Lady Tinder / Cindara		
2014	Smite	Grim Weaver Arachne / Nike / Conqueror Nike / Fallen Angel Nike / The Morrigan / Woodland Rogue The Morrigan		
2015	Skyforge	Ianna		
2015	Dragon Ball Xenoverse	Time Patroller (female voice 8)		
2015	Trillion: God of Destruction	Ashmedia		
2016	Lego Marvel's Avengers	Jane Foster / Thor		
2016	XCOM 2	US Soldier		
2016	Battleborn	Phoebe		
2016	Street Fighter V	Juli		
2016	Dark Rose Valkyrie	Luna Ichinomiya		
2016	Tales of Berseria	Grimoire		
2016	Shadow Warrior 2	Kamiko / Ameonna		
2016	Dragon Ball Xenoverse 2	Time Patroller (female), Caulifla/Kefla	Caulifla and Kefla are DLC	
2016	Orcs Must Die! Unchained	Zoey the Apprentice		
2017	Persona 5	Sae Niijima		
2017	The Legend of Zelda: Breath of the Wild	Riju & Urbosa		
2018	Just Cause 4	Mira Morales		
2019	Astral Chain	Alicia Lopez		
2019	Dragon Ball Legends	Caulifla/Kefla		
2019	ReadySet Heroes	Ruby		
2020	Dragon Ball FighterZ	Caulifla/Kefla	Kefla is DLC	
2020	Persona 5 Royal	Sae Niijima		
2020	Guardian Tales	Elvira, Shapira		
2020	Genshin Impact	Rosaria		
2020	Hyrule Warriors: Age of Calamity	Riju & Urbosa		
2020	Yakuza: Like a Dragon	Saeko Mukoda		
2021	Persona 5 Strikers	Sae Niijima		
2021	Cookie Run: Kingdom	Hollyberry Cookie / Mille-feuille Cookie / Light Cream Cookie / Seaweed Cookie		
2021	Project Mikhail	Kei Ayamine, Yuko Kozuki		
2022	Relayer	Aphrodite		
2022	Star Ocean: The Divine Force	D.U.M.A.		
2022	RWBY: Arrowfell	Winter Schnee		
2023	Fire Emblem Engage	Zephia & Zelestia		
2023	Octopath Traveler II	Additional voices		
2023	Honkai: Star Rail	Natasha		
2023	The Legend of Zelda: Tears of the Kingdom	Riju & Sage of Lightning		
2023	Eternights	Umbra, Aria		
2023	Granblue Fantasy Versus: Rising	Rein, Versusia		
2024	Like a Dragon: Infinite Wealth	Saeko Mukoda		
2024	Slave Zero X	X		
2024	Unicorn Overlord	Virginia		
2024	Arknights	Quartz, Rosa		
2024	Zenless Zone Zero	Evelyn Chevalier		
2024	The Legend of Heroes: Trails Through Daybreak	Elaine Auclair		
2025	The Legend of Heroes: Trails Through Daybreak II	Elaine Auclair		
2025	Story of Seasons: Grand Bazaar	Player H		
2025	Death Drive	Helia		
2025	Hyrule Warriors: Age of Imprisonment	Ardi		
2026	Code Vein II	Josée Anjou		
2026	Yakuza Kiwami 3 & Dark Ties	Saeko Mukoda, additional voices		
2026	The Adventures of Elliot: The Millennium Tales	Fausta		
2026	Goddess of Victory: NIKKE	Prika		

=== Web shows ===
List of voice performances in web shows
Year	Title	Role	Notes	Source
2015–present	RWBY	Winter Schnee		
2016–2024	Camp Camp	Nikki		
2016	Red vs. Blue	Agent Ohio		
2017	Kings of Atlantis	Anemone		
2017–2018; 2021	RWBY Chibi	Winter Schnee		
2018	Nomad of Nowhere	Skout		
2024	Port By The Sea	Umi		

List of live-action performances in web shows
Year	Title	Role	Notes	Source
2017	Star Trek Continues	Sekara	Episode: "What Ships Are For"	

== Awards ==
Year	Award	Role	Status
2014	Breakthrough Voice Actress of the Year	N/A	Nominated
2015	Best Female Lead Vocal Performance in an Anime Movie/Special	Motoko Kusanagi from Ghost in the Shell: The New Movie	Nominated
2017	Voice Actress of the Year; Best Female Lead Vocal Performance in an Anime Television Series/OVA	N/A; Sanae Kouzuki from Sakura Quest	Nominated; Nominated
