= Sidon (The Legend of Zelda) =

Character in The Legend of Zelda game series

- The Legend of Zelda character
- Sidon in Hyrule Warriors: Age of Calamity
- First game: The Legend of Zelda: Breath of the Wild (2017)
- Designed by: Yuko Miyakawa
- Voiced by: James D. Mortellaro (English); Kosuke Onishi (Japanese)

In-universe information
- Race: Zora
- Significant other: Yona (fiancée)
- Nationality: Hyrulean

Sidon (Note: Japanese: シド, Hepburn: Shido) (/ˈsaɪdɒn/ SY-don) is a fictional character in Nintendo's The Legend of Zelda series. He first appeared as a major character in The Legend of Zelda: Breath of the Wild. He reappears as a playable character in the hack-and-slash video game Hyrule Warriors: Age of Calamity and as a non-playable character in The Legend of Zelda: Tears of the Kingdom. Sidon is the prince and eventual king of the amphibious Zora and younger brother of Mipha, one of the four Champions who helped Princess Zelda and Link fight Calamity Ganon. In Breath of the Wild, Sidon helps Link to reach Divine Beast Vah Ruta so he can defeat Waterblight Ganon and free it from Ganon's control. Since his debut, Sidon has received an overwhelmingly positive reception from both fans and critics. He was designed by Yuko Miyakawa, who gave him grey skin and a hammerhead shark motif, though his skin was changed both due to blending issues and to match his skin color with Mipha's. Due to his personality, he has achieved a large fan following and has also been the subject of fan art and Internet memes on social media.

== Concept and creation ==
Sidon was designed by Yuko Miyakawa for The Legend of Zelda: Breath of the Wild, asked to him a "passionate, dignified, and powerful character with a stronger physique than other Zora." She gave him a hammerhead shark design on his head, and his design ultimately lead to the game development staff giving him an in-universe fan club. He was initially grey, but this was changed for multiple reasons, including the fact that it is rainy in Zora's Domain when you first meet him, and a desire to make him resemble his older sister, Mipha. Sidon has the typical design traits of the Zora, being a humanoid with features resembling a fish. He is primarily red or dark pink in colour, with a tail fin sprouting from the top of his head. As a member of the Zora race, Sidon is taller than the average Hyrulean, but is also tall by Zora standards. Due to the slow age rate of the Zora, Sidon is considered a young man despite being over 100 years old. Like other Zora, Sidon wears little clothing, but his attire features several items that reflect his status as prince of the Zora, such as his scarf, epaulettes, bracelets, and belt.

Sidon's Japanese name, Shido (シド), is derived from the notes ti do in the solfege, alongside Mipha (ミファー, Mifā) being named for the notes mi fa (as well as other Zora characters having names derived from music terminology). According to sound director Hajime Wakai and composer Yasuaki Iwata, both of these pairs of notes were intentionally used to create the siblings' respective musical themes and used as leitmotifs elsewhere.

Sidon is the prince of the Zora and a leader of its people, sporting a friendly, brave, and optimistic personality, reflected in his tendency to strike poses during gameplay. He has also been noted for his muscular physique and smile, which have resulted in many fans treating him like a heart-throb. When designing his personality, producer Eiji Aonuma and game director Hidemaro Fujibayashi described him as "overly enthusiastic at first," feeling it was "too much" until they improved it, at which point they grew to love his character. They were unsurprised by how popular he became. Sidon is the son of King Dorephan, the ruler of Zora's Domain, which makes him next in line as ruler. He displays a great deal of respect for his older deceased sister, Mipha, which provides an emotional element to his storyline.

Sidon is voiced in Japanese by Kosuke Onishi and by James D. Mortellaro in English in Breath of the Wild and Hyrule Warriors: Age of Calamity.

== Appearances ==
=== Breath of the Wild ===
Sidon plays a major role in The Legend of Zelda: Breath of the Wild as a supporting character to Link. After Link reaches Zora's Domain, Sidon greets him and shows he holds him in high regard, helping him defeat Waterblight Ganon and regain control of Divine Beast Vah Ruta. After Link gains control of Vah Ruta, Sidon expresses his gratitude and admiration for him. Sidon also appears in the Memory "Champion Mipha's Song" in The Champion's Ballad, the second DLC pack for Breath of the Wild, a flashback which shows him as a baby with Mipha. In the storyline, it is revealed that Mipha is one of the four Champions who helped Zelda and Link fight against Calamity Ganon 100 years earlier, but died in the process. In the present day, at night Sidon is depicted mourning while standing before her memorial statue in Zora's Domain.

=== Age of Calamity ===
Sidon returns in the prequel Hyrule Warriors: Age of Calamity as both a non-playable character in his younger form, and as a playable character in his adult form, wielding various spears and tridents, as well as using water to attack foes. The storyline takes place 100 years before the events in Breath of the Wild when Calamity Ganon launches an attack on Hyrule. After Zelda's small Guardian Terrako travels back to the past through a time portal, she gathers allies to help defeat Ganon. Near the end of the storyline, Sidon arrives from the future to defend Mipha against Waterblight Ganon while declaring he will not let her be taken from him again. The scene reflects upon the tragedy of Mipha's death in the main timeline and the strength of their bond.

=== Tears of the Kingdom ===
Sidon returns in the sequel Tears of the Kingdom as the Sage of Water. He now possesses the ability to wrap Link in an orb of water which, when Link brandishes a sword or other weapon, creates a wave of water. Between games, Sidon is revealed to have a fiancée, Yona. Shortly after the Upheaval, which causes the Sky Islands to appear in the skies above Hyrule, Link and Sidon head to the Water Temple to defeat Mucktorok, a creature that has laid ruin to Zora's Domain. Sidon receives a "Secret Stone" from the ancient Sage of Water, and upon their return, King Dorephan decides to abdicate the throne and passes the crown onto Sidon, which he reluctantly accepts.

== Reception ==
Since his appearance in Breath of the Wild, reception for Prince Sidon has been overwhelmingly positive. Polygon ranked Sidon among the 70 best video game characters of the 2010s decade, with writer Chelsea Stark feeling that he has "captured the internet's heart" more than any other character in the game, praising both his appearance but particularly his "heart of gold." She enjoyed the relationship between him and Link, and hoped to see him return in the sequel. Paste writer Holly Green included Prince Sidon on her list of the best video game characters of 2017, praising him for his "amazingly supportive and positive" personality, strong physique, and him having the "strong thumbs up and plucky smile of a young Dale Cooper." Polygon writer Michael McWhertor also praised him for his sex appeal. GameSpot found Sidon endearing rather than a "regal jerk", expressing no surprise regarding his popularity. CJ Andriessen of Destructoid felt that Sidon deserved his own game due to how he "radiated sunshine" with everything he did and said.

=== Fan content ===
Due to Sidon's popularity, he has been the subject of numerous works of fan art, tweets and memes that have centred around his sexual attractiveness. Susanna Polo for Polygon commented about how his appeal was made apparent to her due to the amount of fanart and screenshots of him on sites like Twitter and Tumblr. In many fan fictions and fandoms, he enters a relationship with Link, the male protagonist of the series. The ship is often called Sidlink. The reason why it became so popular can be found in the way Sidon interacts with Link in the game, which is friendly and encouraging, especially in conversations. Following the reveal of Yona, Sidon's fiancée from Tears of the Kingdom, response has been mostly negative with many insisting that the character either remain a bachelor or be depicted as gay/in love with Link.

== See also ==
- Characters of The Legend of Zelda
