= Hyrule Warriors: Age of Imprisonment =

2025 video game

- Key art featuring Princess Zelda and other major characters
- Developer: AAA Games Studio
- Publisher: Nintendo: JP: Koei Tecmo
- Director: Koki Aoyanagi
- Producers: Ryota Matsushita; Yosuke Hayashi
- Designers: Kyohei Oka; Yifan Chen; Mastaka Kuroki
- Artist: Yuta Nagai
- Writers: Yuki Ikeno; Mari Okamoto; Kaho Takahashi
- Composers: Keiichi Okabe; Ryuichi Takada; Kuniyuki Takahashi; Oliver Good; Keita Inoue; Taichi Joraku
- Series: The Legend of Zelda; Dynasty Warriors
- Engine: Katana Engine
- Platform: Nintendo Switch 2
- Release: November 6, 2025
- Genre: Hack and slash
- Modes: Single-player, Multiplayer

Hyrule Warriors: Age of Imprisonment (Note: Japanese: ゼルダ無双 封印戦記, Hepburn: Zeruda Musō: Fūin Senki; lit. "Zelda Musou: Chronicle of the Sealed War") is a 2025 hack and slash game developed by Koei Tecmo's AAA Games Studio and published by Nintendo for the Nintendo Switch 2. Like its predecessors, Age of Imprisonment is a crossover that mixes the world and characters of Nintendo's The Legend of Zelda series with the gameplay of Koei Tecmo's Dynasty Warriors series. The story takes place during the Imprisoning War depicted in The Legend of Zelda: Tears of the Kingdom (2023). Age of Imprisonment was released on November 6, 2025. The game received generally favorable reviews.

== Gameplay ==
The player controls 1 of up to 4 characters deployed to a given mission, where they must complete certain objectives while fighting off large groups of enemies. Each character has a unique move set, consisting of combos performed by stringing weak and strong attacks together. Characters also have a personal set of unique attacks, powerful moves that can only be used again after a recharge time. Different Zonai devices, which diminish a battery when in use, are also present. Characters have access to a Warrior Special, which is charged by dealing and taking damage, that can dish out large amounts of damage across a wide area. Among groups of weak monsters that are easy to dispatch, players will face captains and bosses. These enemies have a weak-point gauge, which presents itself either after an attack, or the player forcing it out through certain means. Depleting this gauge allows a weak-point smash to be used, dealing massive amounts of damage and likely felling the enemy with one final strike. There are multiple ways to force a weak-point gauge to appear. These counterattacks, among other certain cooperative attacks, boost the Sync gauge. If two characters with full Sync gauges are nearby, they can unleash a Sync Strike. Each character has a different attack whether they are the controlled character starting the Sync Strike or vice versa. However, certain pairings can unleash unique Sync Strikes. Outside of battle, the player makes use of their spoils to upgrade characters by way of assisting the people of ancient Hyrule and improving weapons with Zonaite Steel.

== Plot ==
During her encounter with the unsealed Demon King Ganondorf, Princess Zelda is teleported in time to an era of Hyrule's founding via the power of a secret stone. (Note: As depicted in The Legend of Zelda: Tears of the Kingdom (2023)) She is found by her ancestors King Rauru and Queen Sonia, who help her search for a means of returning to the present. Throughout this time, Zelda aids Rauru's royal duties, trains her inherent light and time powers with Sonia, and explores the Depths beneath Hyrule with Mineru. On one such expedition, Mineru unearths a series of inactive Forbidden Constructs, self-aware humanoid weapons that, as she later deduces, had rebelled against and exterminated most of the Zonai race.

Ganondorf leads the Gerudo people to attack Hyrule Castle, but is thwarted by Rauru and his forces. Falsely conceding to Rauru, Ganondorf betrays his subordinate Ardi, a sympathizer of Hyrule's people, and frames her for the attack; she is rescued by the Korok wanderer Calamo and his companion, a benign Forbidden Construct that Calamo had accidentally activated while exploring the Depths. Under Rauru's surveillance, Ganondorf sends a phantom doppelganger of Zelda to activate a second Forbidden Construct, which absorbs the phantom and destroys its fellow constructs. Ganondorf allows the rampaging construct to distract Rauru while he kills Sonia and takes her secret stone, transforming into the Demon King. He then seizes Hyrule Castle and conjures an army of monsters across Hyrule, including four archfiends serving as their commanders; one of the archfiends, Grimgera, is repelled by Calamo's construct, allowing Rauru's group to retreat to Tanagar Canyon.

Rauru's forces rally the leaders of Hyrule's allied tribes against Ganondorf: Raphica, the Rito elder; Qia, the Zora queen; Agraston, the Goron chief; and Ardi, who replaces Ganondorf as the Gerudo's leader. The leaders are aided by Calamo's construct, which instinctively travels the land to battle Ganondorf's monsters and the other Forbidden Construct. Upon meeting the benign construct, Zelda recognizes its power source as a shard of the broken Master Sword that had been sent back in time with her; noting the construct's resemblance to Link, she names it the Knight Construct. Rauru inducts the Knight Construct and Calamo into Hyrule's army and entrusts the tribe leaders with secret stones, appointing the four, Zelda, and Mineru as sages to turn the tide of the war.

After defeating the archfiends and witnessing the Forbidden Construct's devastation of Korok Forest, Rauru and the sages lead a full-scale attack against Ganondorf at Hyrule Castle. Failing to defeat him, they make a tactical retreat to lure him into the Depths at Hyrule Field, where Rauru sacrifices his life to seal Ganondorf away. Meanwhile, the Knight Construct and Calamo help distract Ganondorf's army on the surface. The Knight Construct destroys the Forbidden Construct, but perishes after the Master Sword shard breaks from overexertion, inspiring Calamo to root as a tree beside his friend's remains to create a new forest. Zelda's lady-in-waiting Lenalia designs murals chronicling the war to ensure Ganondorf's defeat in the future. At Mineru's request, however, she reluctantly omits the Knight Construct and destroys all records of its existence to prevent its technology from being misused, leaving pieces of its body beside Calamo's tree form as a memorial. Long after Zelda transforms into the immortal Light Dragon to wait through history, the tree is shown to have grown extremely large with one of the construct's pieces embedded in its trunk.

== Development ==
Nintendo announced Hyrule Warriors: Age of Imprisonment on April 2, 2025 alongside the upcoming Nintendo Switch 2 console during a Nintendo Direct presentation, where gameplay elements and game mechanics were showcased. The trailer shows playable characters Princess Zelda and Rauru fighting various enemies. A new trailer of the game was shown during the July Nintendo Direct: Partner Showcase. It teased a new construct machine, but no narrower release window was given.

Age of Imprisonment came into fruition when Koei Tecmo producer Yosuke Hayashi asked the Nintendo's Zelda team's permission to develop a new Hyrule Warriors game based on the Imprisoning War that was depicted in The Legend of Zelda: Tears of the Kingdom. During development, Tears of the Kingdom director Hidemaro Fujibayashi shared settings and other additional notes with Koei Tecmo. Fujibayashi served as a supervisor alongside Zelda franchise producer Eiji Aonuma, but unlike with Age of Calamity, their task was to make sure the game was connected closely to Tears of the Kingdom. Koki Aoyanagi, who served as a game's director, revealed that the Sync Strikes were inspired by the hand touch that was presented in Tears of the Kingdom.

== Reception ==
Reception

Aggregate scores
Aggregator	Score
Metacritic	79/100 (Note: Score based on 100 reviews)
OpenCritic	82% recommend (Note: Score based on 114 reviews)

Review scores
Publication	Score
Famitsu	8/10, 9/10, 9/10, 9/10
GameSpot	7/10
GamesRadar+	3/5
IGN	8/10
Nintendo Life	9/10

Hyrule Warriors: Age of Imprisonment received "generally favorable" reviews from critics, according to review aggregator website Metacritic and a "Strong" approval rating from critics according to OpenCritic. In Japan, four critics from Famitsu gave the game a total score of 35 out of 40.

=== Sales ===
In Japan, 73,183 physical copies of Hyrule Warriors: Age of Imprisonment were sold within its first week of release, making it the best-selling retail game of the week in the country. As of January 26, 2026, the game had shipped over one million copies worldwide.
