= Gerudo =

Race in The Legend of Zelda

- The Legend of Zelda race
- Various Gerudo women, including Urbosa (far left) and Riju (middle), in The Legend of Zelda: Breath of the Wild
- First appearance: The Legend of Zelda: Ocarina of Time (1998)
- Created by: Nintendo

In-universe information
- Home world: Hyrule
- Notable members: Ganondorf; Nabooru; Urbosa; Riju

The Gerudo (ゲルド) are a fictional race of people in The Legend of Zelda series. The race was first established in The Legend of Zelda: Ocarina of Time in 1998, though a member of its race, Ganondorf, was conceived in the original The Legend of Zelda in 1986. The Gerudo are an isolationist race, consisting almost entirely of women, with the exception of a male said to be born every 100 years, who by tradition is to become king. One of these men is the aforementioned Ganondorf, who serves as the main antagonist in multiple games in The Legend of Zelda series.

Since appearing in Ocarina of Time, Gerudo have received mixed reception, criticized as a negative depiction of Middle Eastern and South Asian people. Multiple writers have described how the Gerudo are depicted as violent and representing the "Oriental other".

== Concept and creation ==
The Gerudo symbol as depicted post-Ocarina of Time

The Gerudo were created for the video game The Legend of Zelda: Ocarina of Time. They are depicted with dark skin and red hair, and are typically taller and more muscular than the Hylian people. Certain elements of their original design were retained for their appearance in The Legend of Zelda: Breath of the Wild, though lead NPC artist Hirohito Shinoda made a point of designing them so that they "cut striking figures while standing" by shortening their torsos and elongating their legs. He also incorporated elements from Buddhist statues, leading to their Breath of the Wild designs having Indian and Chinese inspirations. The Gerudo race is a matriarchal society of warriors that is almost exclusively female, with the only exception being that a male Gerudo is born every 100 years, who then becomes their leader. Their tendency to bar interaction with men is due to the belief that it will lead to disaster, with the only male interaction allowed being for Gerudo to travel to find a mate. Ganondorf's actions have also made them distrustful of men.

In various depictions, the Gerudo are shown to worship different gods than the Hylians. In Ocarina of Time, instead of worshiping the Goddesses Din, Nayru, and Farore, they worship the Goddess of the Sand. In The Legend of Zelda: Breath of the Wild, they are rarely depicted worshiping the Goddess Hylia, instead focusing their worship on the Seven Heroines, each whom is said to possess a different power. The Gerudo tend to be socially isolated from other areas of Hyrule, living in the desert. They tend to be tall and dark-skinned, and work as thieves in some games to support themselves. In Breath of the Wild, thievery became less common, focusing on becoming masters of trade instead. The Gerudo have their own language, with words such as "vai" and "voe" to refer to women and men respectively. The Gerudo written language has 26 characters, like the Latin alphabet as used by the English language.

== Appearances ==
The Gerudo first appeared as an established race of people in the series' world in 1998's The Legend of Zelda: Ocarina of Time. The Gerudo occupy a desert in western Hyrule, erecting a fortress, and are fiercely opposed to outsiders, especially men, being in their territory, arresting a group of carpenters who attempted to join them. They are the newest nation accepted into the kingdom of Hyrule after Ganondorf agreed to peace as a subterfuge to take over Hyrule. In this game, they are led by Nabooru, who opposes the game's antagonist, Ganondorf, who is also a Gerudo and their king by birthright. These carpenters are later rescued by protagonist Link, who defeated various Gerudo warriors and earned the right to pass through their town without incident. The main antagonist of the series at the time, Ganon, was revealed to be Gerudo in this game, and given a humanoid form named Ganondorf.

The Gerudo also appear in the sequel to Ocarina of Time, The Legend of Zelda: Majora's Mask. In this game, they are pirates and do not have a prophecy of a male king. In this game, Link is tasked with rescuing the eggs of the character Lulu from the Gerudo after they were stolen. Gerudo appear in The Legend of Zelda: Four Swords Adventures, where they were exiled due to Ganondorf's deeds; they took up refuge in a desert to the east of Hyrule while also renouncing Ganondorf and attempting to forge stronger ties to the people of Hyrule. They also appear in Cadence of Hyrule. The people are ruled by a woman called Barriara due to Ganondorf being too young to rule, though he eventually becomes king.

They later appear in The Legend of Zelda: Breath of the Wild as one of its five major races, creating a settlement called Gerudo Town. This town is similarly female-only and isolated. The Gerudo are governed by the child Riju, and Gerudo Town can only be accessed if Link dresses as a woman. In Breath of the Wild, Ganondorf has already been killed, with the Gerudo's Champion, Urbosa, having given her life to prevent his return in the form of Calamity Ganon. Riju and Link, among other Gerudo, work together to stop Vah Naboris from wreaking chaos in the desert. The same Gerudo people returns in The Legend of Zelda: Tears of the Kingdom, where Ganondorf is resurrected, leading the Gerudo people to work to prevent his victory over Hyrule. In flashbacks, Ganondorf is shown to have been their leader in a war against Hyrule. They are forced underground due to persistent sandstorms and undead called Gibdo, with Link sneaking into their bunker to meet with Riju to solve this. Once Link and Riju defeat Queen Gibdo, the attacks and sandstorms die down, allowing them to return to the surface, with Link being given special exception to traverse Gerudo Town as a man.

== Critical reception ==
Comparison between the original Gerudo symbol from Ocarina of Time and the Islamic star and crescent. Writer Johnathan Sanders cited the similarity as an example of the Gerudo as Islamophobic and orientalist.

Since their appearance in The Legend of Zelda: Ocarina of Time, the Gerudo have received mixed reception among critics, particularly as a depiction of non-white people. They have been the subject of analysis and criticism under a racial lens, particularly under a Muslim and the other. Mic writer Ryan Khosravi felt that Breath of the Wild continued the series' "questionable portrayal" of the Gerudo, described as a mixture between Middle Eastern and South Asian countries. He also discussed their invocation of Orientalism, such as their use of a foreign language, scimitar use, and desert town. He also discussed their Ocarina of Time depiction in particular, noting that their depiction as thieves plays into the stereotype of Middle Eastern and South Asian people as being "mysterious and conniving". Waypoint writer Hussain Almahr discussed how Gerudo culture has similar gender views as Muslim-majority countries, except with the roles reversed. He examined how the gender-exclusive Gerudo Town reminded him of growing up in Saudi Arabia, where public spaces were considered masculine due to women lacking the right to freely visit these spaces. He noted that a number of the visual elements were accurate to Arabian culture in Gerudo Town's design, but felt the way they were depicted was just "window dressing". He felt that depicting Link interacting with the Gerudo in Gerudo Town as a man would have been a "unique opportunity" to connect with elements of culture shock, disappointed that Link was just an observer. He discussed how the secret club quest in Breath of the Wild represented a "familiar sense of secrecy and illegality" he experienced with defying rules of Saudi Arabian culture, but felt that it avoided portraying the conflict between old and new culture. Author Byron J. Kimball discussed how Ocarina of Time "others" the Gerudo in an attempt to portray "Western colonialism" as ideal. He regarded Link as a "white savior" of "what the game paints as primitive tribes", the Gerudo included. He also remarks upon how Gerudo have a comparatively lacking number of character models (three), while Hyrulian people have significantly more variance. He finds that this makes the Gerudo more similar to the non-human species, which have only a few models. Kimball felt that the Gerudo were based on Middle Eastern culture and ethnic groups, citing their outfits, iconography, and Arabic chanting associated with them. He claimed this was done not just to signify foreignness, but also "peril and evil", which he called "deeply problematic".

Writer Laurence Herfs discussed how the Gerudo people represent the "oriental other" in Ocarina of Time, noting how they were introduced as the "principal enemy race", describing their depiction as "savage". He noted that while the Gerudo were no longer hostile, they still contained aesthetic similarities to their Ocarina of Time depiction, notably their similarity to Ganondorf and imagery from Orientalist paintings such as "Byzantine-like architecture with small windows, large entry halls littered with carpets and patterned cloth hung in the small alleyways to provide shade". He also noted their tendency to sit on the ground, either as a merchant or merely lounging, which he noted was common in Orientalist paintings and is understood to be "sitting around languorously". He also discussed Arabian stereotypes being present in the Gerudo, such as hooked noses and "scantily-cladded belly dancer outfits [with] golden jewelry". He added that, where Sheikah have an entire language, the Gerudo has only "token words", He also noted that the Gerudo were particularly sexualized, finding the sexuality of the child-character Riju troublesome. He felt that it represented the "über-Other", being an amalgamation of Orientalism through the Western and Japanese gaze at the same time. Writer Johnathan Sanders also felt the Gerudo represented Orientalism, citing the eventually cut symbol referencing the Islamic crescent and star and other elements that persisted beyond the symbol's removal. He regarded the depiction as Islamophobic, particularly the fact that Gerudo in Ocarina of Time were bandits, the only human-like characters Link could attack, and ruled over by the game's antagonist. Yahoo! writer Jessica Ramos noted that, while the "dark-skinned" Gerudo tended to be the villains, the Gerudo's depiction had "room to celebrate", feeling that the Gerudo elucidates players to other cultures and discussing how the Gerudo evoke Middle Eastern and Arabic concepts, such as their garb.

Writer Alicia Fox-Lenz drew comparisons between the Gerudo's structures, built into cliff sides, with the cliff dwellings of Native Americans in Mesa Verde. She speculated, due to the lack of evidence of the existence of their Goddess, that she may be a reinterpretation of the Goddess Din, citing Din's association with the earth and the Triforce of Power, the latter which is associated with Ganondorf. While comparing The Legend of Zelda and J.R.R. Tolkien's works, she compared them to Tolkien's dwarves, citing their isolationism and cultural disagreements regarding creation mythology. Polygon writer Autumn Wright discussed the politics around how gender is treated in Gerudo society, noting how Gerudo are "at once obsessed with and scornful of men", discussing how the existence of Gerudo voe clothing may indicate the existence of transgender men among Gerudo, and how those who recognize Link to be male may indicate the existence of transgender women as well.
