= Hyrule Warriors: Age of Calamity =

2020 video game

- Home menu icon featuring Link, Princess Zelda, the Champions, and Terrako
- Developer: Omega Force
- Publisher: Nintendo: JP: Koei Tecmo
- Director: Ryouta Matsushita
- Producers: Yosuke Hayashi; Masaki Furusawa
- Designer: Kenta Shiraishi
- Programmer: Masayoshi Yamada
- Artist: Yu Oboshi
- Writers: Yuki Ikeno; Mari Okamoto; Ryohei Hayashi
- Composers: Kumi Tanioka; Reo Uratani; Ryotaro Yagi; Haruki Yamada
- Series: The Legend of Zelda; Dynasty Warriors
- Platforms: Nintendo Switch; Nintendo Switch 2
- Release: Nintendo Switch: WW: November 20, 2020; Nintendo Switch 2 (Note: Released for the Nintendo Switch 2 as Hyrule Warriors: Age of Calamity – Definitive Edition.): WW: February 25, 2027
- Genre: Hack and slash
- Modes: Single-player, multiplayer

Hyrule Warriors: Age of Calamity (Note: Japanese: ゼルダ無双 厄災の黙示録, Hepburn: Zeruda Musō: Yakusai no Mokushiroku; lit. "Zelda Musou: Apocalyptic Record of the Calamity") is a 2020 hack and slash game developed by Koei Tecmo's Omega Force and published by Nintendo for the Nintendo Switch. Like the original Hyrule Warriors (2014), Age of Calamity is a crossover that mixes the world and characters of Nintendo's The Legend of Zelda series with the gameplay of Koei Tecmo's Dynasty Warriors series, acting as a spin-off of The Legend of Zelda: Breath of the Wild (2017).

Set 100 years before Breath of the Wild, Age of Calamity takes place in an era glanced via flashbacks in the original game, and follows Link and Princess Zelda as they gather allies across Hyrule to fend off forces led by the evil Calamity Ganon, who is attempting to revive himself and destroy the kingdom. Players control Link, Zelda and their various allies to fight Ganon's minions in large-scale battles reminiscent of Dynasty Warriors, with various gameplay elements taken from The Legend of Zelda.

Hyrule Warriors: Age of Calamity was released worldwide on November 20, 2020, to positive reviews from critics, who lauded its gameplay, varied character playstyles, amount of content, visuals, and soundtrack, although its technical performance (chiefly its inconsistent frame rate) was criticized by some. The narrative drew mixed responses, with praise for the game's characterization and expansion of Breath of the Wild's setting, but dissatisfaction aimed towards its use of time travel. Age of Calamity was a commercial success, becoming the best-selling game in the history of the larger Warriors metaseries in four days and selling four million units as of January 2022. A third Hyrule Warriors game, Hyrule Warriors: Age of Imprisonment, was released for the Nintendo Switch 2 in 2025. An enhanced edition is scheduled to release on Nintendo Switch 2 on February 25, 2027.

== Gameplay ==
Pre-release screenshot showing Link fighting hordes of Bokoblins

Like the previous Hyrule Warriors game, Age of Calamity mixes the hack-and-slash gameplay of Koei Tecmo's Dynasty Warriors franchise with the characters, locations, and elements of Nintendo's Legend of Zelda series. The basic gameplay consists of participating in large-scale battles against enemies, while also completing objectives and taking strategic actions such as capturing bases and commanding troops.

In addition to retaining the combat, material crafting, and weapon-upgrading systems from Hyrule Warriors, the game incorporates environmental puzzle solving and the use of the Sheikah Slate and paraglider from Breath of the Wild. Players can upgrade their characters, complete missions and challenges, use resources to access new areas, build weapons, and cook foods that provide buffs. Unlike in Breath of the Wild, weapons are invulnerable and do not break over time. The game's map is similar to Breath of the Wild's map, and players can choose stages from it and use the Sheikah Tower to explore between regions. The game features 18 playable characters; 14 are obtained via progression in the main story, while four can be unlocked by completing various side quests. Besides the characters, players can also control the gigantic Divine Beasts to destroy large numbers of enemies. The maximum level is level 100.

The game also features compatibility with Nintendo's Amiibo figures, with the figures of the four Champions relaunching alongside the game's release.

== Plot ==
During the Great Calamity, a small Guardian named Terrako awakens within Hyrule Castle and escapes the destruction through a time portal, but is followed by some of Calamity Ganon's Malice. Arriving in an alternate timeline before the Calamity began, Terrako is reactivated by Link and Impa during a battle. They take it to engineers Purah and Robbie for study, learning it comes from a future in which Ganon reawakens and destroys Hyrule. To prevent this, King Rhoam assembles four pilots for the recently discovered Divine Beasts – Mipha, Daruk, Revali, and Urbosa – and commands them, Link, and Princess Zelda to find the Master Sword in Korok Forest.

The group encounter the dark prophet Astor, who has learned of the future from Harbinger Ganon – the current timeline's Terrako, infected by the Malice from the original timeline – and plots to revive and control Ganon with the aid of the Yiga Clan, led by Master Kohga. Astor corrupts Korok Forest, but Link draws the Master Sword and forces him to withdraw; following this victory, Rhoam appoints Link and the pilots as Champions of Hyrule. Purah's research reveals the presence of Sheikah transport towers hidden underground; the Champions reactivate the towers and use them to lead a preemptive strike on the Yiga Clan's hideout in Gerudo Desert. Upon learning from Terrako's records that Ganon will return on Zelda's seventeenth birthday, Rhoam deploys the Divine Beasts and sends Zelda to train in hopes of awakening her sealing magic.

Robbie and Purah are captured by Yiga spies while analyzing Terrako's memory. Terrako escapes and reunites with Zelda as the Calamity arrives. As Hyrule Castle is besieged and the Sheikah Towers are shut down across Hyrule, the Champions are ambushed in their Divine Beasts by the Blight Ganons, while Rhoam seemingly sacrifices himself for Link, Zelda, and Impa to escape Hyrule Castle. Terrako summons Sidon, Yunobo, Teba, and Riju from the original timeline to assist the Champions, buying Link enough time to destroy the Blight Ganons. With the Champions saved and the Divine Beasts restored, they begin to clear the way to Hyrule Castle. To stop the timeline from changing, Astor sacrifices many Yiga Clan members to resurrect the Blight Ganons. Link is cornered by the Blight Ganons in Fort Hateno, but Zelda awakens her sealing magic to save him.

Hyrule's army is bolstered by Kohga and the Yiga Clan's remnants, who seek revenge against Astor, and Rhoam, who survived using a shield artifact given to him by Zelda. Purah uses the Sheikah Towers to transport their allies to Hyrule Castle for a full-scale assault against Ganon's forces. Although the Divine Beasts weaken Ganon's spirit form, Harbinger Ganon consumes Astor and becomes Calamity Ganon, who then corrupts Terrako, forcing Link to destroy it; during this time, Zelda remembers she activated Terrako as a child before Rhoam took it away so she would focus on her training. Zelda and her allies confront Ganon, but are unable to damage him until Terrako self-destructs to weaken him, allowing Link to defeat him and Zelda to permanently seal Ganon away. The future heroes are returned to their timeline while Link, Zelda, and their allies look out at the now peaceful Hyrule. In a secret ending, Purah and Robbie repair Terrako, reuniting Zelda with her friend.

== Development ==
Age of Calamity was revealed in a trailer that was released in September 2020, presented by Zelda series producer Eiji Aonuma and Koei Tecmo producer Yosuke Hayashi. The game features the same art assets as Breath of the Wild, but uses the more combat-focused gameplay style of the previous Hyrule Warriors game. More information was revealed at the Tokyo Game Show on September 26.

The game came into fruition when Breath of the Wild's director Hidemaro Fujibayashi and art director Satoru Takizawa pitched the idea to Aonuma, who liked the idea and after discussions. Aonuma then approached Hayashi, a producer from Koei Tecmo, to make a new Hyrule Warriors about the events of the Great Calamity, which were mentioned but not properly shown in Breath of the Wild. Aonuma felt that the battles would complement well with the style of a Warriors game. Nintendo's Zelda developers worked more closely with the development team at Koei Tecmo than on Hyrule Warriors, providing advisement and assistance with gameplay, graphics, world, and dialogue.

During the Nintendo Treehouse Live gameplay presentation on October 7, Nintendo stated that the game would explore more backstories and relationships between characters, aspects that were not thoroughly examined in Breath of the Wild. At the end of that month, the demo became available to download from the Nintendo eShop, which includes the first chapter of the game. Kotaku noted from the demo that the game felt more connected to Breath of the Wild than to a Warriors title.

=== Downloadable content ===
Downloadable content (DLC) for the game was released throughout 2021 via an "Expansion Pass". A purchase bonus was made available on May 28, featuring a new weapon and costume for Link. The first wave of content, titled "Pulse of the Ancients", was released on June 18, and features an additional playable character (Battle-Tested Guardian), new weapon types for Link and Zelda, new challenges in the Royal Ancient Lab, and newly added challenging enemies. The second wave of content, titled "Guardian of Remembrance", was released on October 29, and adds new story stages set during the events of the main game. "Guardian of Remembrance" also adds new battle skills for existing characters, and two additional characters: Purah and Robbie, who function as a single unit, and Sooga.

== Reception ==
=== Critical response ===
Reception

Aggregate scores
Aggregator	Score
Metacritic	78/100
OpenCritic	78% recommend (Note: Based on 116 reviews); 29% recommend(Pulse of the Ancients) (Note: Based on 7 reviews.)

Review scores
Publication	Score
4Players	80/100
Destructoid	8.5/10
Electronic Gaming Monthly	4/5
Eurogamer	Recommended
Famitsu	36/40
Game Informer	7.5/10
GameSpot	6/10
GamesRadar+	4/5
Hardcore Gamer	4/5
IGN	9/10
Jeuxvideo.com	14/20
Nintendo Life	8/10
Nintendo World Report	8.5/10
Pocket Gamer	3.5/5
RPGFan	86/100
Shacknews	9/10
The Guardian	3/5
USgamer	4/5
VG247	4/5

Age of Calamity holds a score of 78 out of 100 on review aggregator website Metacritic, indicating "generally favorable reviews". Fellow review aggregator OpenCritic assessed that the game received strong approval, being recommended by 78% of critics.

Four reviewers for Famitsu gave the game a total score of 36/40, the second-highest score for a 2020 Nintendo Switch game at that point of the year (with Animal Crossing: New Horizons receiving 38/40 in March of the same year). TJ Denzer of Shacknews gave the game a 9/10 rating, giving high praise to the gameplay, differences between character playstyles, and story; they called Age of Calamity as the most fleshed out and well-crafted Dynasty Warriors-style game. They claimed that the game expands upon Breath of the Wild masterfully in both the iconic battle locations of the game and the soundtrack that accompanies them.

Giving the game a 4/5 rating, Scott Baird of Screen Rant stated that the game "offers a fascinating look into the world of Breath of the Wild alongside great gameplay", praising the combat system which rarely feels repetitive or dull, the differences between the character playstyles, the "hundreds of hours worth of content", and the character development. However, he criticized the camera, which "tends to get stuck during the indoor stages, which is especially frustrating when trying to dodge enemy attacks". While Baird praised the game for offering "a fascinating look at the world of Breath of the Wild", he also pointed out that the setting "severely limits the types of enemies that the players will encounter [compared to the first Hyrule Warriors], and the few additions to the lore (like elemental variations of monsters) feel less than impressive". Michael Goroff of Electronic Gaming Monthly also gave the game a 4 out of 5 review, praising the game's gameplay, and use of the universe, style, and gameplay elements from Breath of the Wild, but was critical of the story's choice to feature time travel.

=== Sales ===
In the United Kingdom, the game placed sixth in physical sales during its launch week, selling nearly 324% more copies than Hyrule Warriors: Definitive Edition during the same timeframe in 2018. It also sold 173,215 physical copies within its first week of release in Japan, making it the second best-selling retail game of the week in the country. It was ultimately the 16th highest selling game in Japan for 2020. In the United States the game was the sixth best-selling game during its launch month.

Four days after its release, Koei Tecmo revealed that the game has shipped over 3 million digital and physical copies worldwide, becoming the best-selling Warriors game of all time and outselling all previous games in the entire Warriors franchise including all Dynasty Warriors games and their spin-offs, Fire Emblem Warriors, and the previous Hyrule Warriors games. The game has shipped over 3.5 million copies by the end of 2020. As of April 2021, the game has sold over 3.7 million units. As of January 2022, the game has sold 4 million units worldwide, making it one of the best-selling Switch games.

== Legacy ==
In January 2021, Impa, Master Kohga, and Terrako from Age of Calamity were added to the crossover fighting game Super Smash Bros. Ultimate as collectable Spirits.

On April 2, 2025, Hyrule Warriors: Age of Imprisonment was announced exclusively for the Nintendo Switch 2. Similar to Age of Calamity, Age of Imprisonment is a prequel story detailing the events of the Imprisoning War, as depicted in The Legend of Zelda: Tears of the Kingdom (2023). The game was released on November 6, 2025.

During a September 2026 Nintendo Direct livestream, Nintendo announced Hyrule Warriors: Age of Calamity – Definitive Edition, an enhanced port for Nintendo Switch 2. The port, scheduled for release on February 25, 2027, will feature improved performance, able to display more enemies on screen at once at a higher framerate. It also includes all downloadable content, and adds a harder Calamity Mode difficulty setting. Existing Age of Calamity owners could purchase Definitive Edition at a discount and transfer their save data.
