= Master Sword =

Fictional weapon

- The Legend of Zelda element
- Model of the Master Sword in The Legend of Zelda: Breath of the Wild
- Publisher: Nintendo
- First appearance: The Legend of Zelda: A Link to the Past (1991)
- Created by: Kensuke Tanabe; Masanao Arimoto; Tsuyoshi Watanabe
- Genre: Action-adventure

In-universe information
- Type: Magic sword
- Owners: Link
- Function: Ultimate weapon capable of defeating evil
- Traits and abilities: Repel evil Time travel Emit sword beams

The Master Sword (マスターソード, Masutā Sōdo) is a fictional divine magic sword in Nintendo's The Legend of Zelda series. At times, it is referred to in-universe both as the Blade of Evil's Bane and the Sword that Seals the Darkness. It was introduced in the 1991 action-adventure video game The Legend of Zelda: A Link to the Past and has since appeared in most other games in the series.

The sword is the signature weapon of Link, the series's main protagonist, and has become an integral part of the character's visual identity and also a core element of Zelda iconography. In the narrative of the series, it is a powerful, sacred weapon that Link repeatedly uses to defeat the main antagonist, Ganon and other forces of evil. Throughout the Zelda series, it is shown to have various magical powers, including the capability to repel evil, alter the flow of time, and emit sword beams to attack surrounding enemies.

In addition to The Legend of Zelda series, the Master Sword has also appeared in various other video games, media, and merchandise. These include Super Smash Bros., Mario Kart 8, and Hyrule Warriors. It has been recreated in fan art, cosplay, and weaponry and has become a widely recognizable object in video gaming.

== Characteristics ==
The Master Sword is a divine, magic sword and the signature weapon of Link, the hero of The Legend of Zelda series. It has become a defining aspect of Link's identity alongside the Hylian Shield and a prominent icon used to market the franchise. The majority of The Legend of Zelda video games follow a similar story arc that involves Link embarking on a journey that eventually leads him to recovering the Master Sword. The blade is traditionally found in its stone pedestal and must be pulled from the pedestal by Link to retrieve it. Although it is not always the strongest sword in Zelda games, the Master Sword is superior to other in-game weapons as it is the only weapon in most games that has the capability of defeating Ganon and every forces of evil.

The Master Sword has been referred to by various names. In several games, it is named as the "Blade of Evil's Bane". In Breath of the Wild and Tears of the Kingdom, the Master Sword is referred as the "Sword that Seals the Darkness". In the mythology of the series, the Master Sword is a divine object—in Skyward Sword, it originates in the Goddess Sword, created by the goddess Hylia, and is inhabited by a humanoid spirit named Fi. Over the course of the game, the Goddess Sword is transformed into the Master Sword, a powerful blade that has the magical ability to repel evil.

The design of the sword has evolved over the course of each Zelda title, but it has become identifiable by its purple and silver design. It is a one-handed longsword blade featuring a blue or purple hilt with green grip, purple spread-winged handguards and a yellow gem inlaid in the centre. A defining feature of the sword is that it displays the Triforce, which is engraved on the blade just above the ricasso.

The sword possesses various magical abilities, such as generating fire attacks and lightning attacks in A Link to the Past. In Ocarina of Time, it acts as a seal that protects the Sacred Realm and the Triforce. It can also alter time by placing it in its pedestal to send Link back to his childhood or by removing it again to travel to the future. In The Wind Waker, the sword blocks the powers of Ganondorf and freezes time around Hyrule Castle, so that removing the blade from its pedestal restores Ganondorf's minions. In Twilight Princess, Link uses it to open a path in time. In Skyward Sword, it can be pointed towards the sky to gather energy from the heavens and launch a light beam known as a Skyward Strike. In A Link Between Worlds, the Master Sword is the only weapon that can break the magical barrier that is placed on Hyrule Castle. In Hyrule Warriors: Age of Calamity, it emits light beams that deal high damage to surrounding enemies. In Breath of the Wild its superior qualities are indicated by its high durability, as it is the only weapon that is unbreakable and must be recharged before being wielded again. When in close proximity to enemies associated with Calamity Ganon, it glows blue and doubles its attack strength. In Tears of the Kingdom, it possesses similar characteristics and emits higher powered attacks in proximity to enemies associated with Ganondorf.

== Development ==
Takashi Tezuka, the director of A Link to the Past credited screenwriter Kensuke Tanabe for conceiving the moment in the game when Link obtains the Master Sword. The scene established the mythological importance of the blade within the series as the only sword with the power to repel evil, but also emphasised its symbolic significance. Tezuka noted that in this moment the sword recognises Link as a hero. He explained that "our main aim was to show the birth of a hero in a scene fitting of The Legend Of Zelda, and overlap this with a sense of achievement for the player that they have been recognised as a hero after having overcome many challenges".

In 2011, Nintendo released Skyward Sword, which aimed to develop an early fictional history of Hyrule and create an origin story for the Master Sword. Producer Eiji Aonuma said that the premise was built around the game's motion controls: "This time, the theme is the sword which makes use of the Wii MotionPlus accessory..." The plot suffered from inconsistencies in the pre-existing timeline. Director Hidemaro Fujibayashi explained: "We settled on having the sky and surface world, and on top of that, it was going to tell the story of the creation of Hyrule, with the untold story of the origin of the Master Sword... So, looking back at the series so far, we began knitting together the various elements. And then all sorts of contradictions arose". A television commercial for the game's release prominently featured the Master Sword to advertise the game's motion controls, which involved using the Wii MotionPlus to control the sword's movements on screen.

== Appearances ==
Artwork of the Master Sword for The Legend of Zelda: A Link to the Past

=== The Legend of Zelda series ===
In the original The Legend of Zelda (1986), a fantasy weapon appears without any defining features, but was the precursor for future iterations of the Master Sword. It was not until 1991 that the Master Sword was introduced in the series with the release of A Link to the Past. The game involves Link setting out to rescue Princess Zelda by retrieving the blade from its pedestal in the Lost Woods and using it to defeat the main antagonists, the evil wizard Agahnim and finally, Ganon. Link must obtain three pendants to prove himself worthy of claiming the sword.

The sword reappeared in Ocarina of Time, and was the first iteration of the longsword design in 3D. As well as being the only weapon that is capable of defeating Ganondorf, it also acts as a seal to protect the Sacred Realm and the Triforce. In this iteration, it is located in the Temple of Time, locked behind the Door of Time. Link must collect three Spiritual Stones to open the Door of Time and claim the Master Sword from its pedestal. Due to his youth, the sword seals him in the Temple of Time for seven years until he is ready to be the Hero of Time. Link can then use the Master Sword to travel back to his childhood by placing it in the pedestal.

In The Wind Waker, Link finds the Master Sword inside the sunken Hyrule Castle. It is once again presented as the only sword capable of defeating Ganondorf. The sword blocks Ganondorf's magical powers and freezes time around the castle. When the blade is removed from its pedestal, it restores Ganondorf's minions and magic and it loses its power to repel evil. Once Link has replenished the Master Sword's power, he is able to destroy Ganondorf by plunging it into his forehead and turning him to stone.

When Link seeks out the Master Sword in Twilight Princess, it is located on its pedestal deep in the woods in the Sacred Grove within the ruined Temple of Time. Retrieving the sword is the only way to break the sorcerer Zant's magic, which has turned Link into a wolf. When he returns to the Sacred Grove later in the game, he uses the sword to open a path in time. The sword becomes more powerful when it is infused with the divine power of the Sols. As in previous games, the Master Sword is finally used to kill Ganondorf by stabbing it into his chest.

In Skyward Sword, the Master Sword plays a central role in Link's journey to defeat the main antagonist Demon King Demise and prove himself as the hero. The plot charts the weapon's transition from the Goddess Sword, a weapon left by the goddess Hylia, into the Master Sword. Link uses three Sacred Flames to forge the Goddess Sword into the Master Sword and, after defeating Demise, seals him inside the sword by placing it in its pedestal. In the finale, a humanoid spirit named Fi, who acts as Link's companion throughout the game, is placed in an eternal slumber within the Master Sword.

Link again retrieves the sword from its pedestal in the Lost Woods in A Link Between Worlds, after collecting three Pendants of Virtue and then rescues Seven Sages and Princess Zelda. During the game, the Master Sword is upgraded by blacksmiths in Hyrule and Lorule after Link collects master ore from various locations, making it a more powerful weapon.

Throughout Breath of the Wild, Link can obtain the Master Sword once he is strong enough to pull it from its pedestal. It is located deep in the Lost Woods within Great Hyrule Forest. In this game the sword is heavily damaged and covered in Malice after being used in battle against Calamity Ganon 100 years before the events of the game. After successfully retrieving the repaired Master Sword and purchasing the DLC, the player is given the opportunity to tackle one of the end game challenges named "The Trial of the Sword", which is aimed at advanced players. Upon successfully completing all of the levels, the Master Sword is permanently upgraded to its highest attack level.

In Tears of the Kingdom (2023), the direct sequel to Breath of the Wild, Link begins the game wielding the Master Sword, only for it to be shattered by Ganondorf's power. After he awakens on the Great Sky Island with the broken sword, he sends it back in time to Zelda, who time-traveled back to the era of Hyrule's founding. To defeat Ganondorf, Zelda chooses to consume a secret stone to transform into the Light Dragon, allowing the Master Sword to regain its sacred energy over millennia. In the present day, Link finds Zelda in her draconified form and pulls the Master Sword from her skull. Like other weapons in the game, the Master Sword can be fused with various materials to make it more powerful in combat.

=== Other media ===
The Master Sword has made appearances in various other video games. Link appears with the Master Sword as a playable character in the original 1999 Super Smash Bros. In Super Smash Bros. Ultimate, Link also appears as a playable character in eight different costumes that include the Master Sword and Hylian Shield. The Master Sword has also made an appearance in Animal Crossing games and Soulcalibur II. In Nintendo Land, players can wield the Master Sword as part of The Legend of Zelda: Battle Quest. Link makes a cameo appearance with the Master Sword and the Hylian Shield in Scribblenauts Unlimited. In Bayonetta 2, Bayonetta is able to use the Master Sword after equipping Link's costume. In the racing game Mario Kart 8, the Master Sword was introduced with Link in the first DLC. It also makes an appearance in the Hyrule Circuit as a statue inside the castle. It is also obtainable as gear alongside the Hylian Shield in the Nintendo Switch version of The Elder Scrolls V: Skyrim. The Master Sword was also introduced in Super Mario Maker 2 with a Zelda update in 2019. The sword transforms Mario into Link and bestows a range of special abilities. In the hack and slash video game Hyrule Warriors (2014), the Master Sword appears as a prominent weapon. Link can use it in battle alongside the Hylian Shield, and after completing certain tasks, the sword has the capability of emitting the sword beam. In Hyrule Warriors: Age of Calamity (2020), Link is able to use the Master Sword throughout the game after defeating an antagonist named Astor and retrieving the blade from its pedestal. Once obtained, Link is able to level up the sword by fusing other weapons into it and add unique effects by equipping it with Seals. The fully maxed out Master Sword then unlocks an additional sword beam attack when Link is at full health. The Master Sword has also been featured prominently in Zelda-related media, including books and other merchandise.

=== In popular culture ===
The Master Sword features in the lyrics of a single inspired by The Legend of Zelda series titled "Power of the Triforce" by British metal band DragonForce.

== Merchandise ==
The Master Sword has been merchandised across a wide variety of official Zelda products. It has been reproduced as a prop and toy replica. It is prominently displayed on official clothing and used in themed products, such as a sword-shaped umbrella and candy. In 2023, a Japanese toy manufacturer produced a model of the sword in the form of a logic puzzle. A light-up decayed Master Sword was included as a prize in a lottery in Japan. Various amiibo feature Link and Zelda wielding the Master Sword. In May 2024, a Lego set of the Great Deku Tree was unveiled, featuring the Master Sword on its pedestal.

== Reception ==
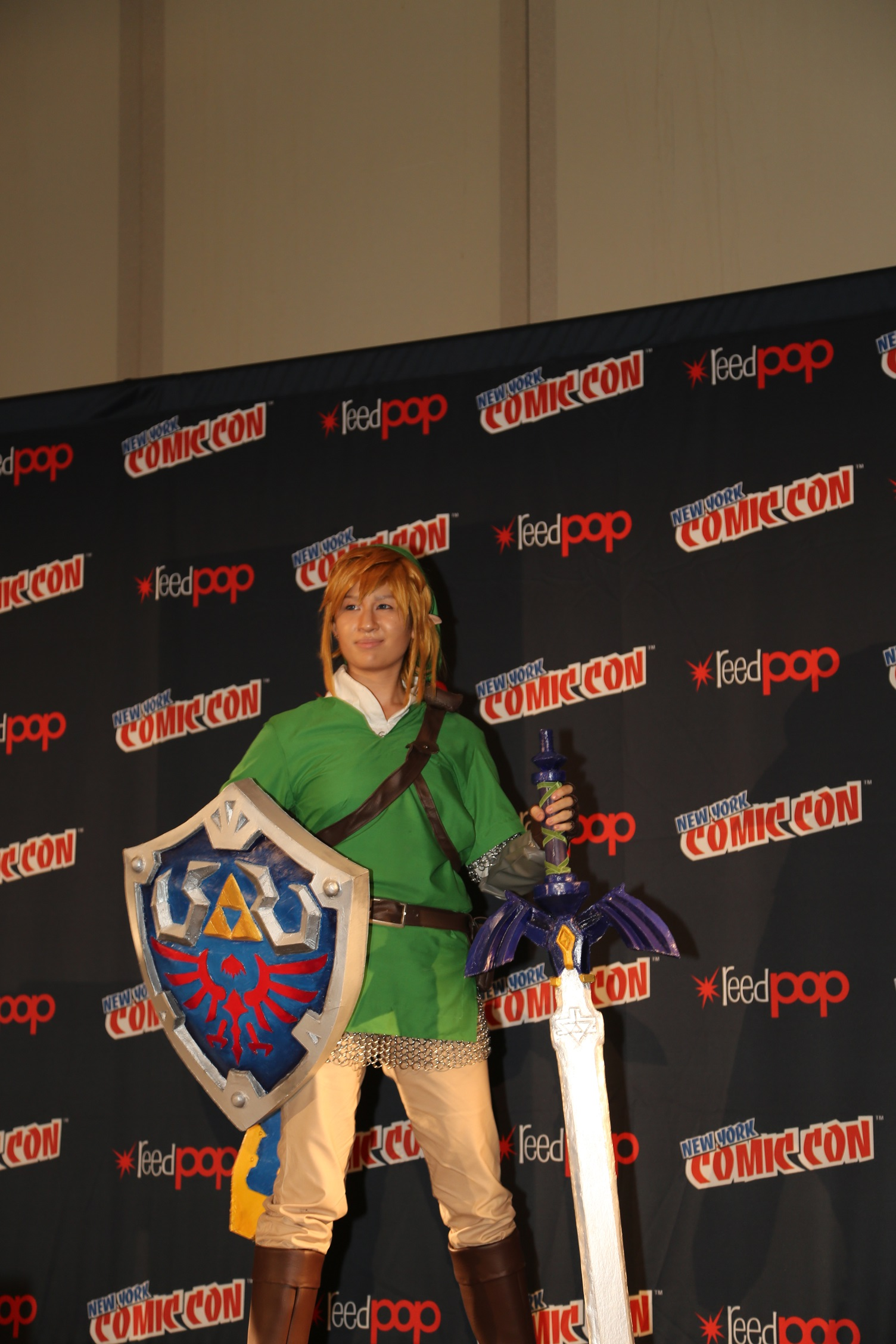
A cosplayer dressed as Link holding the Master Sword and the Hylian Shield. These two components have become integral aspects of the character's identity.

Since its introduction in The Legend of Zelda series, the Master Sword has become a recognisable object in video gaming. It has been recreated in the form of fan-made replicas and also used as a functioning weapon. Critics have observed that the Master Sword and other Zelda plot elements have been heavily influenced by Celtic mythology. Cian Maher of Eurogamer drew comparisons between the Master Sword and a sword in Irish mythology called Claíomh Solais, also known as The Sword of Light. This sword was similar to Cú Chulainn's sword, known as Cruadín Catuchenn, one of the legendary god-killing weapons in Irish mythology. He noted the similarity of the heroes completing three tasks before obtaining the Sword of Light and that the weapon is capable of killing an enemy that is impossible to defeat, which resembles Link's quest and the Master Sword's capability of killing undefeated enemies like Ganon. Aaron Greenbaum, writing for Den of Geek, commented on the contradictory origins of the sword within the series. He noted that the story of who forged the sword has been retconned since A Link to the Past, due to the "confusing" nature of The Legend of Zelda timeline and that Skyward Sword corrected this by introducing the idea that Link forges the sword, providing a "superior in-game explanation".

Nintendo Power described the Master Sword as one of the best weapons in gaming, citing that it is more than just a powerful sword, but also integral to Link's adventures and development as a character. Writing for Paste, Khee Hoon Chan commented on the significance of the Master Sword in the narrative of the Zelda storyline: "There are few scenes in entertainment as iconic as the image of young Link pulling the Master Sword from its pedestal, a virtual, modern retelling of The Sword and the Stone. More than just a weapon, the Master Sword came to be a symbol of Link's destiny". The Master Sword was ranked as one of the coolest swords in gaming by Ron Whitaker for The Escapist magazine, who commented, "the Master Sword doesn't look all that special. It's not that big, it doesn't have flames rising from it, and it doesn't look all that intimidating. But in the hands of the right person, it can save the world". He also listed it as one of the most iconic video game weapons.

In a review of Skyward Sword, GamesRadar described the Master Sword as "the unspoken star of The Legend of Zelda", and praised the game for placing it directly in the hands of the player through the MotionPlus and making the sword a focal point of the game. Jim Norman of Nintendo Life thought that obtaining the Master Sword in Tears of the Kingdom was a "series defining moment" due to the cinematic spectacle of pulling the sword from the Light Dragon's head and the tension involved in performing the act. He also noted that the sword's role as an integral part of the storyline means that finding its location provides a "special melancholic twist". Matthew Byrd, writing for Den of Geek, considered the Master Sword to be "the most important weapon in gaming history", due to the way it is obtained in A Link to the Past. He opined that the moment when the player obtains the sword is significant because it provides the player with a sense of fulfilling their destiny, which had not been achieved by any previous piece of gear in gaming. He commented: "Few weapons in gaming history until that point had been treated with such reverence, and few felt so good to finally acquire". IGN staff consider the Master Sword to be the greatest or most iconic video game weapon of all time, and the act of pulling it out in Ocarina of Time the most unforgettable video game moment of all time. Destin Legarie from IGN wrote: "This beautiful sword is an icon to gamers everywhere, as well as an instantly recognizable item of central importance in the Zelda franchise. Sure, there have been plenty of great weapons and items in The Legend of Zelda series, but only the Master Sword has endured since the days of A Link to the Past. Each story since the Super Nintendo entry has been crafted around Link's quest to obtain this legendary blade".
