= The Legend of Zelda: Tears of the Kingdom =

2023 video game

- Developer: Nintendo EPD (Note: Additional work by Monolith Soft)
- Publisher: Nintendo
- Director: Hidemaro Fujibayashi
- Producer: Eiji Aonuma
- Designers: Yohei Fujino; Yasutaka Takeuchi; Mari Shirakawa
- Programmers: Takuhiro Dohta; Takahiro Okuda
- Artist: Satoru Takizawa
- Composers: Manaka Kataoka; Maasa Miyoshi; Masato Ohashi; Tsukasa Usui
- Series: The Legend of Zelda
- Platforms: Nintendo Switch; Nintendo Switch 2
- Release: Nintendo Switch; May 12, 2023; Nintendo Switch 2; June 5, 2025
- Genre: Action-adventure
- Mode: Single-player

The Legend of Zelda: Tears of the Kingdom (Note: Japanese: ゼルダの伝説 ティアーズ オブ ザ キングダム, Hepburn: Zeruda no Densetsu: Tiāzu obu za Kingudamu) is a 2023 action-adventure game developed by Nintendo EPD for the Nintendo Switch. The player controls Link as he searches for Princess Zelda and fights to prevent Ganondorf from destroying Hyrule. Tears of the Kingdom retains the open-world gameplay and setting of its predecessor, Breath of the Wild (2017), but features new environments, including islands floating in the sky and a vast underground area called the Depths. It introduces construction elements, allowing the player to create devices that aid in combat or exploration.

EPD began working on Tears of the Kingdom following Breath of the Wild's completion, with the director Hidemaro Fujibayashi and the producer Eiji Aonuma reprising their roles. The gameplay concepts originated from ideas for Breath of the Wild's downloadable content that exceeded the scope. EPD was inspired by social media posts to create mechanics that encouraged experimentation. They drew inspiration from Wii Sports Resort (2009), The Elder Scrolls V: Skyrim (2011), and Red Dead Redemption 2 (2018), seeking to develop a game similar to but distinct from Breath of the Wild.

Nintendo announced Tears of the Kingdom via a teaser at E3 2019, before its full reveal at E3 2021. It was released on May 12, 2023, to acclaim, with praise for its expanded world, new mechanics, scale, and story, though the frame rate received criticism. It sold over 10 million copies within three days and 22.71 million by June 2026, making it the Switch's eighth-bestselling game. An enhanced version was released for the Nintendo Switch 2 in June 2025, while a spin-off, Hyrule Warriors: Age of Imprisonment, was released in November 2025.

== Gameplay ==
By combining the Zonai devices, the player can build contraptions for exploration, combat and solving puzzles.

Tears of the Kingdom retains the open world action-adventure gameplay of The Legend of Zelda: Breath of the Wild (2017). As Link, the player explores the main setting of Hyrule and two new areas: the sky, which has several floating islands, and the Depths, a vast underground area beneath Hyrule. Link can climb, ride horses, or use a paraglider to soar through the air. Characters and locations from Breath of the Wild were kept and modified to fit the story.

The sky is an area composed of several floating islands that contain puzzles, treasure, enemies, and bosses. The Depths is a dark region that requires items to illuminate and contains treasures as well as hazards such as lava and gloom, a harmful substance that temporarily reduces Link's maximum hearts. The player removes this effect by returning to the surface of Hyrule. Tears of the Kingdom features several dungeons that contain puzzles and bosses, similar to previous entries in the Zelda franchise. The four main dungeons, the Water Temple, Wind Temple, Fire Temple, and Lightning Temple must be completed to advance the story.

Tears of the Kingdom introduces Zonai devices, which can be used for combat, exploration, or solving puzzles and to construct vehicles, such as rockets, sleds, and fans. Breath of the Wild's Sheikah Slate-based abilities have been replaced with five new powers: Ultrahand, Fuse, Ascend, Recall, and Autobuild. Ultrahand allows the player to pick up and move different objects or attach them together, which can be used with Zonai devices to create vehicles and other constructs. Fuse allows the player to combine materials, equipment, and various objects in the world to a shield or weapon. For example, fusing a rocket to Link's shield allows him to fly through the air. Recall is used on an object to rewind its movement, such as by rewinding a falling rock in an upwards direction. Ascend allows the player to move upwards through solid surfaces, granting them access to previously inaccessible areas. Autobuild instantly recreates a device crafted with Ultrahand, automatically using nearby devices and objects if available, or if parts are missing, creating replacements at the cost of a material called zonaite.

Like in Breath of the Wild, Korok seeds and Shrines can be found across Hyrule. Once the player obtains four Lights of Blessing by completing Shrines, they can spend them at a Goddess Statue to increase Link's maximum hearts or stamina. Korok seeds can be traded to increase his inventory capacity, allowing him to hold more melee weapons, shields, or bows. The new recipe system allows the player to keep track of ingredients needed to make meals or elixirs.

== Plot ==
Tears of the Kingdom takes place a number of years after Breath of the Wild, at the end of the Zelda timeline. Link and Zelda explore a cavern beneath Hyrule Castle, from which a poisonous substance called "gloom" has been seeping out and causing people to fall ill. There, they find murals depicting the founding of Hyrule and a subsequent conflict known as the Imprisoning War—an ancient battle against a being referred to as the "Demon King"—which Zelda believes to be related to the mysterious Zonai race. Upon venturing deeper, they discover a mummy being restrained by a disembodied arm. The mummy awakens and attacks Link and Zelda; in the aftermath, Link's right arm is wounded and the Master Sword is shattered. Hyrule Castle is raised into the sky, and Zelda falls into the depths below; as Link tries to catch her, she vanishes along with a mysterious artifact. Link is rescued by the arm, awakening later on the Great Sky Island to find that it has replaced his damaged limb. He meets the spirit of Rauru, a Zonai and the source of his new arm, who helps him traverse the island. Once Link reaches his destination, the shattered Master Sword vanishes and he returns to the surface below.

Link learns that the event in the cavern, known as the Upheaval, has wrought chaos upon Hyrule, and he sets out to investigate reports of strange phenomena throughout the kingdom. He ventures into ancient Zonai temples after reuniting with his allies: Sidon, the prince and, later, king of the Zora; Tulin, a young Rito archer and son of Teba, a past ally of Link's; Yunobo, a Goron, now the president of the YunoboCo mining company; and Riju, the young chief of the Gerudo. After defeating the monsters that have taken over the temples, Link and his allies find artifacts called secret stones and meet the spirits of ancient sages, who appoint Link's allies as their successors and pass down their secret stones. After numerous sightings of Zelda throughout Hyrule, Link finds her at Hyrule Castle, where she reveals herself to be an illusion created by Phantom Ganon, a servant of the Demon King Ganondorf, the mummy whom Link previously encountered. After defeating Phantom Ganon, Link sets out to find Mineru, the last of the ancient sages, who remains in the physical world via spiritual projection. He assembles a mechanical body for her spirit to inhabit.

Through Mineru, the ancient sages, and items called Dragon's Tears scattered across Hyrule, Link learns of Zelda's fate. The artifact she found was a secret stone that transported her to the distant past, where she met Rauru, Hyrule's first king, and Sonia, its first queen. After Ganondorf killed Sonia and used her secret stone to become the Demon King, Rauru appointed his older sister Mineru, Zelda, and the leaders of the Zora, Rito, Gorons, and Gerudo as sages. With their help, Rauru fought Ganondorf and sacrificed himself to seal him away. Later, Zelda received the shattered Master Sword from the future and tasked the sages with aiding Link once Ganondorf reawakened. To repair the Master Sword and bring it to Link in the present, she swallowed her secret stone and underwent "draconification", becoming the immortal Light Dragon and losing her sense of self.

In the present, after ridding the Great Deku Tree of gloom in Korok Forest, Link retrieves the repaired Master Sword from the Light Dragon and heads below Hyrule Castle to confront Ganondorf. With aid from Sidon, Tulin, Yunobo, Riju, and Mineru, Link battles an army of monsters before engaging Ganondorf himself. Nearing defeat, Ganondorf swallows his secret stone, becoming the Demon Dragon in a final attempt to kill Link. With help from the Light Dragon, Link uses the Master Sword to shatter the Demon Dragon's secret stone, killing it. The spirits of Rauru and Sonia help Link return Zelda to normal and restore his right arm before fading away; he and Zelda fall to the surface, where they reunite. Some time later, on the Great Sky Island, Mineru bids farewell to Zelda and Link before fading away, while the new sages vow to protect Hyrule.

== Development and release ==
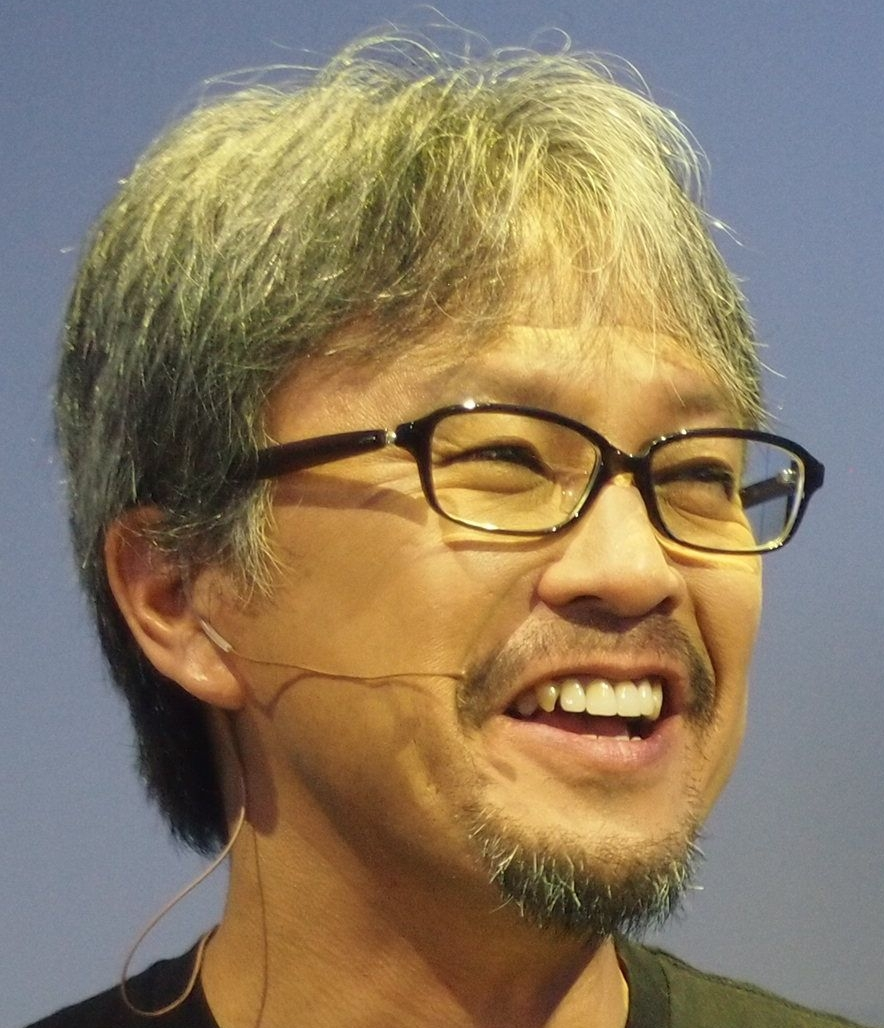
Like Breath of the Wild, Tears of the Kingdom was produced by Eiji Aonuma.

Development of Tears of the Kingdom began after the completion of Breath of the Wild. The developers had thought of several features to include as downloadable content (DLC) for Breath of the Wild, but the sheer number of ideas inspired them to create a new game instead. As with its predecessor, Tears of the Kingdom was developed by Nintendo's Entertainment Planning & Development (EPD) division, Production Group Number 3, and was directed by Hidemaro Fujibayashi and produced by Eiji Aonuma. Monolith Soft provided additional support for the character and item design. While he was shown early demos, the role of Zelda creator Shigeru Miyamoto was minimized due to scheduling conflicts as he was producing The Super Mario Bros. Movie. He was credited as "general producer", the same position he had held in the series since the late 2000s.

Due to its similarity to Breath of the Wild, the developers experienced "strong déjà vu". Aonuma reiterated that the development team wanted to create something original while also being similar to the previous game, realizing some aspects "were already as they should be". Fujibayashi added the team would occasionally struggle to differentiate between the games. Tears of the Kingdom reintroduced dungeons to the series, which are connected to Hyrule's surface and can be tackled in any order the player chooses. According to the technical director Takuhiro Dohta, the dungeons were designed with regional characteristics to make them unique to their respective environments, similar to previous games in The Legend of Zelda franchise. The dungeons were created to maximize the gameplay by showcasing the range of Link's powers and gadgets. Additionally, they were designed to be accessed seamlessly rather than being closed off, allowing the player to descend from the sky into the dungeon and conveniently enter and exit.

Dohta mentioned Wii Sports Resort as an inspiration when adding new mechanics, further noting that using familiar locations is useful for players when skydiving. Aonuma cited the open world games Red Dead Redemption 2 and The Elder Scrolls V: Skyrim. The team expanded the world to include the sky and underground. Aonuma noted that hardware limitations for The Legend of Zelda: Skyward Sword prevented a seamless descent from the sky to the surface; instead, Link was limited to diving from specific points. With the capabilities of the Nintendo Switch, Tears of the Kingdom allowed players to traverse a world connected both horizontally and vertically, and with greater player agency.

One of the core concepts of gameplay is the ability to build new items. As such, the development team created more tools in Tears of the Kingdom to give players a unique gameplay experience, inspired by videos of their accomplishments and activities posted on social media after the release of Breath of the Wild. Zonai devices were introduced to inspire additional creativity, but this required a balance between the player's creativity and setting limits to prevent them from exploiting the game. A theme of hands was introduced and is present in the mechanics, visuals, and sound; Aonuma stated that the theme was present in the plot, which involves connecting to Hyrule's history. Dohta explained that Link's abilities to create items and work with other characters furthered this theme, with his right arm being a way to make the character unique compared to his earlier iterations. The Ascend ability was developed from a debug feature that Aonuma and Fujibayashi used to exit the caves, which they implemented as a feature because they wanted a quick way to get to the surface. Its implementation presented several challenges, such as ensuring that a player would not land on an empty space due to loading issues.

Tears of the Kingdom was first announced at E3 2019 as an untitled sequel to Breath of the Wild. Nintendo debuted a trailer revealing gameplay, story elements, and a 2022 release window at E3 2021. By March 2022, Tears of the Kingdom was completed, but Nintendo delayed the release for a year to refine it. Nintendo later changed the release window to Q2 2023. More information was revealed in the Nintendo Direct presentation held in September 2022, including the title Tears of the Kingdom and a launch date of May 12, 2023. A Nintendo Direct in February 2023 teased more gameplay elements. Two weeks before release, a playable version of the game leaked online as a disk image. An enhanced version for the Nintendo Switch 2 was released on June 5, 2025. It features improved resolution, framerate, HDR support, and additional functionality with the Nintendo Switch App. A spin-off, Hyrule Warriors: Age of Imprisonment, was released for the Nintendo Switch 2 on November 6, 2025.

== Reception ==
Reception

Aggregate scores
Aggregator	Score
Metacritic	NS: 96/100 (Note: Based on 150 reviews); NS2: 95/100 (Note: Based on 18 reviews)
OpenCritic	97% recommend (NS); 100% recommend (NS2)

Review scores
Publication	Score
Destructoid	10/10
Digital Trends	4.5/5
Edge	10/10
Eurogamer	4/5
Famitsu	10/10, 10/10, 10/10, 10/10
Game Informer	9.75/10
GameSpot	10/10
GamesRadar+	4.5/5
IGN	10/10
Nintendo Life	10/10

According to the review aggregator platform Metacritic, the Switch version of Tears of the Kingdom received "universal acclaim". Numerous critics found it to be of similar quality to or an improvement upon Breath of the Wild. Reviewers praised the additions of the sky islands, Depths, and caves, saying that the areas expanded the open world introduced in its predecessor.

IGN said that Tears of the Kingdom was better than Breath of the Wild for its story and mechanics, while GameSpot lauded it for building upon its predecessor. Furthermore, IGN also praised the Depths and said that the areas fit well alongside the surface of Hyrule. VG247 said that Tears of the Kingdom was a separate experience from Breath of the Wild, calling its scale immense and its mechanics creative. While feeling that it did not replicate the experience of playing through its predecessor, Game Informer wrote that the game evoked a compelling response by how it revisited previous locations. Nintendo Life wrote that the three settings were well-connected to each other despite their different mechanics and themes. Eurogamer felt that the player could spend their entire time exploring the Depths, but would need to return to the surface for useful tools, helping create a compelling gameplay loop. The reviewer contended that the skies were more fun to explore than the Depths, praising their designs and comparing them to environs from Skyward Sword and The Wind Waker. On the other hand, Video Games Chronicle considered the Depths more interesting than the sky sections, finding them to be difficult and fun in contrast to the sky's focus on the story.

The new powers received praise. GamesRadar+ called these abilities well-designed, saying that they offered creative solutions to problems and highlighting Ultrahand in particular. The reviewer mentioned that some of the abilities felt like gaming the system, and would make the game less enticing when the player could use them to break its rules. Polygon said that learning how to use the powers was one of the main appeals of the experience, and likened Ascend to a noclip mode and the rest to cheat codes. The Guardian felt that the powers allowed for the player to circumvent every object in multiple potential ways, writing that this freedom to progress was novel and fun. GameSpot described the powers as superior to those featured in Breath of the Wild, and contributed to an experience that the reviewer considered creative and distinct.

The story was considered a highlight. GameSpot praised the story as one of the best in the series, calling it a standout element. Nintendo Life said that the narrative was more compelling than that of its predecessor, adding that the characters featured in the story and related side quests were more engaging. Destructoid found the story to be overall better to its predecessor's, calling its pacing faster and more enticing despite criticizing some of its components. In contrast, VG247 found the narrative less important compared to the gameplay and that it contained some repetition due to its open-ended nature. Polygon felt that the dungeons featured alongside the story were among the weaknesses, feeling these areas infringed upon player freedom and that Link's allies were too verbose. Some reviewers criticized the voice acting. GamesRadar+ said that the characters sounded disconnected from their roles and depleted the quality of the cutscenes. VG247 echoed this opinion, but said that the cutscenes made up for this with their music and atmosphere.

Criticism focused on the performance. Nintendo Life wrote that Tears of the Kingdom highlighted the Switch's limited capabilities, mentioning the falling frame rate while saying that it was only a minor problem. Polygon agreed, writing of a poor frame rate and load times in some areas similar to Breath of the Wild. IGN noted the lack of improved performance, but found it irrelevant after comparing its quality to the rest of the game. GameSpot found the frame rate satisfactory and performance problems rare, noting that the art obscured the loss of quality. It applauded the developers for having the game work effectively on an old console.

=== Sales ===
Tears of the Kingdom was the first Nintendo-developed game to be priced at US$70. More than 10 million copies of Tears of the Kingdom were sold in its first three days of release, making it the fastest-selling game in The Legend of Zelda franchise, as well as the fastest selling Nintendo game in the Americas with over four million copies sold in the US alone. Tears of the Kingdom sold over 2.24 million copies within its first three days of release in Japan, 1.1 million being physical copies. In August 2023, it was reported that the sales of Tears of the Kingdom may have boosted the gross domestic product of Japan, with a 2.8% increase in consumer spending in the semi-durable goods sector during April to August 2023, which included video games. It was the fifth best-selling video game in the US in 2023. By June 2026, it had sold 22.71 million copies worldwide.

=== Accolades ===
The Legend of Zelda: Tears of the Kingdom was selected by Famitsu, IGN, Edge, Game Informer, Giant Bomb, Destructoid, ComicBook.com, Polygon, Shacknews, The Guardian, and Siliconera as their Game of the Year.

Awards and nominations
Year	Ceremony	Category	Result	Ref.
2020	The Game Awards 2020	Most Anticipated Game	Nominated	
2021	Golden Joystick Awards	Most Wanted Game	Nominated	
2021	The Game Awards 2021	Most Anticipated Game	Nominated	
2022	Golden Joystick Awards	Most Wanted Game	Won	
2022	The Game Awards 2022	Most Anticipated Game	Won	
2023	Gamescom	Best Nintendo Switch Game	Won	
2023	Gamescom	Best Audio	Won	
2023	Gamescom	Best Gameplay	Won	
2023	Gamescom	Most Epic	Won	
2023	CEDEC Awards	Special Award	Won	
2023	Golden Joystick Awards	Ultimate Game of the Year	Runner-up	
2023	Golden Joystick Awards	Best Supporting Performer (Patricia Summersett as Princess Zelda)	Nominated	
2023	Golden Joystick Awards	Best Audio	Nominated	
2023	Golden Joystick Awards	Best Game Community	Nominated	
2023	Golden Joystick Awards	Nintendo Game of the Year	Won	
2023	Golden Joystick Awards	Best Game Trailer (Official Trailer #3)	Nominated	
2023	The Game Awards 2023	Game of the Year	Nominated	
2023	The Game Awards 2023	Best Game Direction	Nominated	
2023	The Game Awards 2023	Best Art Direction	Nominated	
2023	The Game Awards 2023	Best Score and Music	Nominated	
2023	The Game Awards 2023	Best Action/Adventure Game	Won	
2023	The Game Awards 2023	Player's Voice	Nominated	
2024	13th New York Game Awards	Big Apple Award for Game of the Year	Nominated	
2024	13th New York Game Awards	Tin Pan Alley Award for Best Music in a Game	Nominated	
2024	13th New York Game Awards	Central Park Children's Zoo Award for Best Kids Game	Nominated	
2024	27th Annual D.I.C.E. Awards	Game of the Year	Nominated	
2024	27th Annual D.I.C.E. Awards	Adventure Game of the Year	Won	
2024	27th Annual D.I.C.E. Awards	Outstanding Achievement in Game Direction	Nominated	
2024	27th Annual D.I.C.E. Awards	Outstanding Achievement in Game Design	Nominated	
2024	27th Annual D.I.C.E. Awards	Outstanding Technical Achievement	Nominated	
2024	24th Game Developers Choice Awards	Game of the Year	Nominated	
2024	24th Game Developers Choice Awards	Best Audio	Nominated	
2024	24th Game Developers Choice Awards	Best Design	Nominated	
2024	24th Game Developers Choice Awards	Innovation Award	Won	
2024	24th Game Developers Choice Awards	Best Narrative	Nominated	
2024	24th Game Developers Choice Awards	Best Technology	Won	
2024	24th Game Developers Choice Awards	Best Visual Art	Nominated	
2024	24th Game Developers Choice Awards	Audience Award	Nominated	
2024	20th British Academy Games Awards	Best Game	Nominated	
2024	20th British Academy Games Awards	Audio Achievement	Nominated	
2024	20th British Academy Games Awards	Game Design	Nominated	
2024	20th British Academy Games Awards	Music	Nominated	
2024	20th British Academy Games Awards	Narrative	Nominated	
2024	20th British Academy Games Awards	Technical Achievement	Won	
2024	20th British Academy Games Awards	EE Game of the Year	Nominated	
2024	20th British Academy Games Awards	Animation	Longlisted	
2024	20th British Academy Games Awards	Artistic Achievement	Longlisted	
2024	2024 Kids' Choice Awards	Favorite Video Game	Nominated	
2024	Hugo Awards	Best Game or Interactive Work	Nominated	
2024	Japan Game Awards 2024	Grand Award	Won	
2024	Japan Game Awards 2024	Award for Excellence	Won	
2024	Japan Game Awards 2024	Best Sales Award	Won	
