= Gymnast86 =

American speedrunner and streamer

- Born: 1998 (age 27–28)
- Occupations: Speedrunner; streamer

Twitch information
- Channel: Gymnast86
- Years active: 2013–present
- Genre: Gaming
- Games: The Legend of Zelda: Skyward Sword, The Legend of Zelda: The Wind Waker HD, and The Legend of Zelda: Breath of the Wild, The Legend of Zelda: Skyward Sword HD
- Followers: 74.8 thousand

YouTube information
- Channel: Gymnast86
- Subscribers: 70.8 thousand
- Views: 20.2 million
- Last updated: November 10, 2026

Carl Wernicke (born 1998), known online as Gymnast86 (stylized as gymnast86), is an American speedrunner and streamer notable for his speedrunning world records and discovery of exploits in various 3D Zelda games.

== Career ==
In 2013, Wernicke was one of only 12 people who were able to complete The Legend of Zelda: The Wind Waker (2002) below 5 hours.

In March 2018, Wernicke regained the world record in The Legend of Zelda: The Wind Waker HD (2013) under any completion percent with a time of 1:03:30. He practiced from 10 to 25 hours per week and developed a chronic hand injury from the consistent stress on his hands.

Wernicke completed a speedrun of The Legend of Zelda: Breath of the Wild (2017) in 58:01, the first run of the game under 1 hour, one week after the game released. In his speedrun, the route had the player go straight to Hyrule Castle, the end of the game, and beat the final boss with the weapons at the location.

== Discovery of exploits ==
After LinkOscuro successfully performed "barrier skip", a long-hypothesized glitch in The Legend of Zelda: The Wind Waker which would allow the player to clip through a large barrier surrounding Hyrule Castle, a location visited multiple times during normal play, but only allowing the player to break the barrier and access the final dungeon as intended during the third and final visit, Wernicke replicated the glitch and found a consistent method for performing the exploit, drastically altering the speedrun route by allowing players to escape Hyrule Castle and enter the endgame far earlier than intended. He used the glitch in a speedrun of 3:05:57 set on April 11, 2017.

Wernicke also discovered a consistent method for reaching the top of Ganon's Tower, one of the final rooms in the game. Previously, a glitch known as "zombie hovering", performed at the end of the speedrun, was needed in the Wii U version of the game to enter the door at the top of the room leading to the final boss battle, as prior upgrades that are meant to be used to access the door – while intended to be required to complete the game during normal play – are not obtained in the speedrun. Zombie hovering, a notoriously difficult glitch, previously relied on a random element regarding the flight paths of despawning fairies, collectibles that restore the player's health, to allow the player character to survive the trick. Wernicke, however, discovered an exploit that instead used an enemy known as a "Morth" to spawn a health-restoring heart under specific conditions, removing the need for the luck associated with performing the trick.

While attempting to access a locked off area in Skyloft—the starting and hub area of The Legend of Zelda: Skyward Sword (2011)—Wernicke discovered a powerful exploit that came to be known as "Reverse BitMagic", in a game that previously lacked large glitches. The glitch allows the player to modify some memory flags in different areas of the game. The exploit has renewed interest in speedrunning Skyward Sword.

== Personal life ==
Wernicke lives in Arizona. He graduated from college with a degree in computer science. He streams and uploads to YouTube as a job, and has stated that he is working on various projects to help him find a career later.
