= The Legend of Zelda: Ocarina of Time (2026 video game) =

2026 video game

- Developer: Nintendo EPD (Note: Additional work and development support by Monolith Soft, SRD, 1-Up Studio, Nintendo Pictures, Nintendo Technology Development, Nintendo European Research & Development, Nintendo Studios Singapore and Bandai Namco Studios Tokyo and Malaysia)
- Publisher: Nintendo
- Director: HokWai Ng
- Producers: Eiji Aonuma; Hidemaro Fujibayashi
- Designers: Junhiro Nishiyama; Olivier Nizard
- Programmer: Hiroki Taguchi
- Artists: Aya Shida; Yasuhiro Takao; Hirohito Shinoda
- Writers: Naoki Mori; Mari Shirakawa; Saina Omatsu; Chika Amemiya
- Composers: Masato Ohashi (Note: Rearrangement of the original score by Koji Kondo.); Hayato Sato; Kairi Hamada; Rika Hayashi
- Series: The Legend of Zelda
- Platform: Nintendo Switch 2
- Release: November 5, 2026
- Genre: Action-adventure
- Mode: Single-player

The Legend of Zelda: Ocarina of Time (Note: Japanese: ゼルダの伝説 時のオカリナ, Hepburn: Zeruda no Densetsu: Toki no Okarina) is a 2026 action-adventure game developed and published by Nintendo for the Nintendo Switch 2. It is a remake of the 1998 game released for the Nintendo 64. The player controls Link as he explores the kingdom of Hyrule on a quest to stop the evil Gerudo king Ganondorf. Gameplay mechanics include navigating dungeons and an overworld, time travel, and playing songs on a magical ocarina.

The game was announced in the June 2026 Nintendo Direct, with mixed reactions to its graphical art style, akin to a puppet show. Ocarina of Time was developed by Nintendo EPD, starting development in 2023 after the release of The Legend of Zelda: Tears of the Kingdom. Producer and director of the 1998 game Eiji Aonuma said the remake was developed both to celebrate the 40th anniversary of the series, and to help familiarize the younger development team with the "origins" of the 3D games, which differ from the style of The Legend of Zelda: Breath of the Wild. The original game's soundtrack was expanded and arranged under supervision from original composer Koji Kondo, and the story was expanded with new cutscenes, dialogue, and added voice acting.

Highly anticipated due to the original's reputation as one of the greatest video games ever made, it was released to critical acclaim on November 5, 2026, and sold more than 5.2 million copies within four days. Critics praised its gameplay improvements, art style, and faithfulness to the original.

== Gameplay ==
Like in the original game, the player controls Link from a third-person perspective as he explores Hyrule. The remake retains the story of the 1998 original, following Link as he explores the kingdom of Hyrule across two time periods to defeat the evil Gerudo king Ganondorf, accompanied by the fairy Navi. Link fights with a sword and shield, and can use other weapons such as projectiles, bombs and magic spells. The graphical style has been updated; Game Informer described it as "stylized realism".

Gameplay changes from the original include the addition of a sprinting ability, faster swimming, motion control aiming, full camera control, and automatic jumps being replaced with button-based jumping. Players can also now scroll between items, similarly to The Legend of Zelda: Breath of the Wild (2017). Cutscenes are now partially voiced.

Several locations are updated. For example, Hyrule Castle Town is expanded into a fully explorable area rather than a pre-rendered location with a fixed camera. Whereas time would previously pause in towns and buildings, time now continuously passes in all areas. Players can view a story summary and track their objective with the "Threads of Time" log feature. Some areas retain loading screens to maintain the original experience. To activate ocarina songs, players may perform melodies using the Nintendo Switch 2 microphone. A new Hall of Fallen Foes area allows players to view statues and information about defeated enemies, as well as replay boss battles.

Ocarina of Time integrates with the Nintendo Switch App for smartphones, allowing players to use the "Zelda Notes" service introduced in the Nintendo Switch 2 Editions of Breath of the Wild and Tears of the Kingdom. Zelda Notes can be used to view an interactive map, track player progress, play an ocarina and answer quiz questions. Unlike some previous versions of Ocarina of Time, no Master Quest mode is included.

== Development ==
Following the release of The Legend of Zelda: Tears of the Kingdom, series producer Eiji Aonuma began considering how to celebrate the franchise's upcoming 40th anniversary. A remake of the 1998 video game The Legend of Zelda: Ocarina of Time was chosen as the anniversary project after reflecting that much of current staff working on the series had limited familiarity with older entries in the franchise, piquing his curiosity over how they would approach modernizing what he deemed to be a significant and influential installment in the franchise. Aonuma, who directed the original game, served as producer alongside long-time series director Hidemaro Fujibayashi, while team members who began working on the series with The Legend of Zelda: Breath of the Wild and Tears of the Kingdom took on lead creative roles.

While Aonuma and Fujibayashi expected the team to push for more drastic changes and alterations, they remained largely faithful to the original pacing and structure. In regards to improving the visuals, music and overall presentation, they considered how to meet the expectations of modern hardware without losing the "familiar presence" the original game offered longtime fans. Art director Aya Shida, viewing the original as having a "mysterious, almost dreamlike charm" with colorful and quirky characters, took influence from puppet shows, with "the analog feel of practical effects films" acting as a guiding phrase for the updated character designs. Care was also taken to avoid having players mistake Ocarina of Time as an open world game, akin to recent Zelda games, by reserving the highest amount of environment detail for explorable areas. The music director, Masato Ohashi, mixed uncompressed audio samples from the original game into the newly orchestrated music tracks of some locations, such as Link's home, to invoke a sense of nostalgia.

== Release ==
Nintendo announced the remake during a Nintendo Direct presentation on June 9, 2026, with a teaser trailer and a 2026 release date. Gameplay was shown at The Legend of Zelda 40th anniversary Direct on September 8, and the release date was announced as November 5. Legend of Zelda-themed Nintendo Switch 2 and accessories were released on October 29. The first run of physical copies of Ocarina of Time have textured foil cover art. Amiibo based on Young Link and Young Zelda are planned for release in 2027, which unlock special masks in the game. Other Legend of Zelda Amiibo grant the player free items a limited number of times per day.

== Reception ==
Reception

Aggregate scores
Aggregator	Score
Metacritic	95/100 (Note: Score based on 130 reviews)
OpenCritic	99% (Note: Score based on 116 reviews)

Review scores
Publication	Score
4Players	10/10
Eurogamer	5/5
Game Informer	9.25/10
Gamekult	8/10
GameSpot	9/10
GamesRadar+	5/5
IGN	9/10
Jeuxvideo.com	17/20
Nintendo Life	9/10
The Guardian	5/5
Video Games Chronicle	5/5
Noisy Pixel	8/10
RPG Site	8/10
Slant Magazine	3.5/5

According to the review aggregator website Metacritic, Ocarina of Time received "universal acclaim". According to the review aggregator website OpenCritic, 99% of critics recommended it. In The Guardian, Keza MacDonald praised the presentation, cutscenes and gameplay changes, and wrote that new and old players would be moved. She concluded that "Nintendo's modern Zelda team have turned one of the best games of the 1990s into one of the best games of the 2020s."

Before Ocarina of Time was released, the art style drew mixed responses. Polygon described it as "a balance between modern realism and fairy tale whimsy", with more muted colors and "earthy" tones, but with "creepy" character models. Some compared it unfavourably to DLSS 5 or generative AI, or said it resembled a number of "hyper-realistic" fan remakes of Ocarina of Time using Unreal Engine. Others praised the visual style, in particular the detailed environmental design. Polygon noted that Zelda art direction has a history of dividing opinion, with games such as The Wind Waker (2002), Breath of the Wild (2017) and Link's Awakening (2019).

Reviews praised the art style and attention to detail. In IGN, Logan Plant praised the cutscenes and Link's animation, and recommended the "Pro mode", in which the UI only showcases updated features. Nintendo Life's Ollie Reynolds called the visuals "breathtaking" and "staggering", particularly praising Kokiri Forest. MacDonald praised the cutscenes, and Anna Koselke, writing for GamesRadar, felt the voice acting helped showcase the "moving" story. The gameplay was lauded for its improvements and visual flourishes. Reynolds lauded the combat for its "ferocity", and praised the jumping feature. Plant called the controls "snappy" and the melee combat "crunchy", calling the remake "modern, but delightfully old school". Koselke praised the nostalgic and "immersive" gameplay. The audio input feature for the ocarina, and the "Hall of Fallen Foes" gauntlet, were also praised.

Reynolds and Koselke criticized the save system (in which the player is limited to a single save slot per profile) and the lack of Master Quest. Plant criticized the lack of harder difficulty upon completing the game, a feature of previous Zelda games, and called the remake "overcorrected". The item system, in which the player is limited to select a single item in a single row, received mixed reviews. A feature particularly criticized in Echoes of Wisdom, some reviewers and players disliked its integration in the remake. However, MacDonald praised the feature, particularly for the Water Temple, and Reynolds found it limited compared to Echoes of Wisdom. In Slant Magazine, Cole Kronman gave the remake three and a half out of five, writing that the original contained serious flaws that were not corrected. He wrote: "Praising this new Ocarina of Time demands some capitulation to remake culture, to an insidious strain of critique and consumerism that treats the evolution of games-as-art as a straight line and prioritizes graphical fidelity and mechanical slickness over artistic intent."

=== Sales ===
Ocarina of Time sold more than 5.2 million copies in its first four days, including 810,000 copies in Japan. It is the biggest launch within that time frame for a Switch 2 game.

=== Accolades ===
Awards and nominations
Year	Award	Category	Result	Ref.
2026	The Game Awards 2026	Game of the Year	Pending	
2026	The Game Awards 2026	Best Art Direction	Pending	
2026	The Game Awards 2026	Best Score & Music	Pending	
2026	The Game Awards 2026	Best Action/Adventure Game	Pending	
