= Hidemaro Fujibayashi =

Japanese video game designer (born 1972)

- 藤林 秀麿
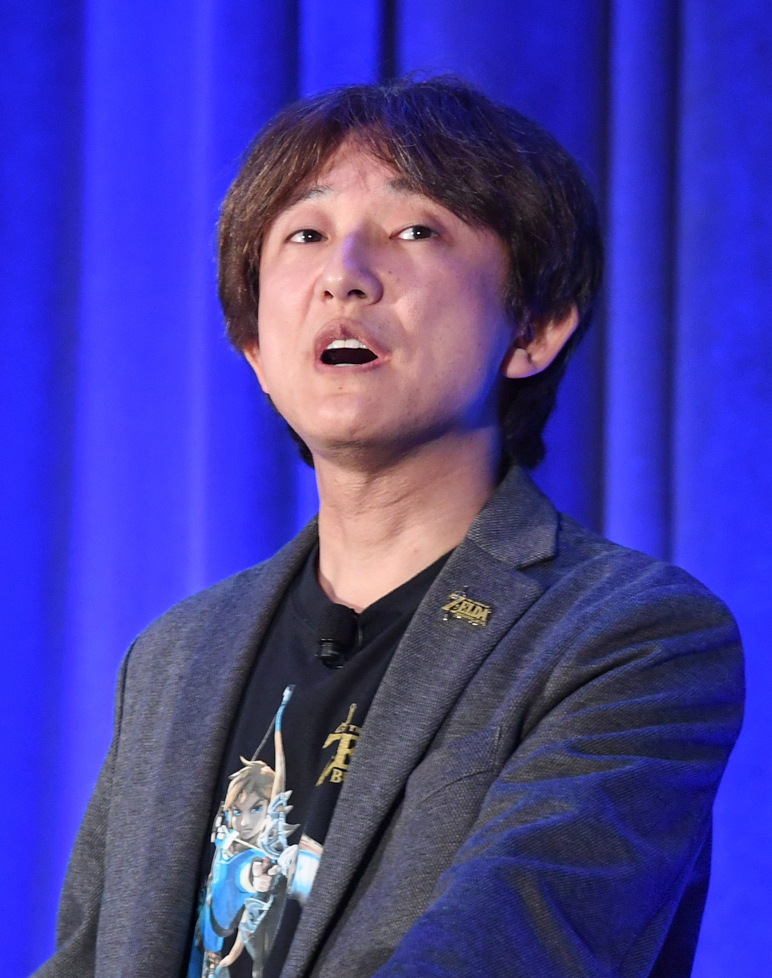
- Fujibayashi in 2017
- Born: October 1, 1972 (age 54); Kyoto Prefecture, Japan
- Occupations: Video game designer, director
- Employers: Capcom (1995–2005); Nintendo (2005–present)
- Known for: The Legend of Zelda series

Hidemaro Fujibayashi (藤林 秀麿, Fujibayashi Hidemaro; born October 1, 1972) is a Japanese video game designer, director and producer at Nintendo.

He has directed several games in the Legend of Zelda series, including The Legend of Zelda: Four Swords, The Legend of Zelda: Oracle of Seasons and Oracle of Ages and The Minish Cap while he was still at Capcom, and after joining Nintendo he directed Skyward Sword, Breath of the Wild, and Tears of the Kingdom.

Fujibayashi worked at Capcom prior to joining Nintendo in 2005.

== Career ==
Before he entered the video game industry, Fujibayashi had designed layouts of haunted attractions for Japanese theme parks. At that time, he had considered finding an occupation involving production, and came upon a job opening from a company that developed video games. He was fascinated with the fact that his application for employment had to include a sample of his work that would be inspected directly upon transmittal, and he became enamored with the idea of being a game designer. Fujibayashi joined Capcom in 1995, where he gained experience as planner for the interactive movie Gakkō no Kowai Uwasa: Hanako-san ga Kita!! and the mahjong game Yōsuke Ide Meijin no Shin Jissen Maajan. He became part of the company's Production Studio 1, and designed and directed the puzzle game Magical Tetris Challenge.

Fujibayashi's first involvement with the Zelda series was with the Game Boy Color games The Legend of Zelda: Oracle of Seasons and Oracle of Ages. In the initial development stages, he acted as sort of a clerk, who gathered all staff ideas and created presentations to propose the game concepts to producer Shigeru Miyamoto. Fujibayashi eventually became the director, participated as planner and scenario writer, and devised a system to link the two games for consecutive playthroughs. During his time at Capcom, he also directed the Game Boy Advance games The Legend of Zelda: Four Swords and The Minish Cap. Following his switch to Nintendo, Fujibayashi was assigned to The Legend of Zelda team and became the subdirector and story writer for Phantom Hourglass. He has since directed Skyward Sword, Breath of the Wild, and Tears of the Kingdom. According to Fujibayashi, the most important aspect of game design is making the fundamental rule set of a video game absolutely clear to a player.

== Ludography ==
Year	Game	Role
1995	Gakkō no Kowai Uwasa: Hanako-san ga Kita!!	Designer
1996	Ide Yousuke Meijin no Shin Jissen Mahjong	Designer
1998	Magical Tetris Challenge	Director, designer
2001	The Legend of Zelda: Oracle of Seasons and Oracle of Ages	Director, designer, scenario writer
2002	The Legend of Zelda: Four Swords	Director, designer
2004	The Legend of Zelda: The Minish Cap	Director, designer, writer
2007	The Legend of Zelda: Phantom Hourglass	Subdirector, story writer, multiplayer director
2011	The Legend of Zelda: Skyward Sword	Director, writer
2017	The Legend of Zelda: Breath of the Wild	Director
2020	Hyrule Warriors: Age of Calamity	Scenario supervisor
2023	The Legend of Zelda: Tears of the Kingdom	Director
2025	Hyrule Warriors: Age of Imprisonment	Scenario supervisor
2026	The Legend of Zelda: Ocarina of Time	Producer
