= Great Plateau =

Fictional location from The Legend of Zelda

- The Legend of Zelda location
- The Great Plateau as it appears in The Legend of Zelda: Breath of the Wild
- First appearance: The Legend of Zelda: Breath of the Wild (2017)
- Last appearance: Hyrule Warriors: Age of Imprisonment (2025)
- Created by: Nintendo
- Genre: Fantasy

In-universe information
- Location: Hyrule

The Great Plateau is an area from The Legend of Zelda: Breath of the Wild, a 2017 action-adventure game developed and published by Nintendo. It acts as the game's opening area and tutorial, teaching the player the game's basic mechanics. In contrast to tutorials in previous Zelda games, the Great Plateau is largely exploration based and encourages them to experiment and go about their own path. The tutorial finishes once the player completes four shrines lingered throughout the plateau, before the player character, Link, is given a paraglider that allows him to safely leave the plateau.

The Great Plateau has been acclaimed by critics for its design and approach to teaching the player Breath of the Wild's mechanics. Multiple gaming journalists have labeled it one of the best video game tutorial areas, if not the best. The location later returned in the game's sequel, Tears of the Kingdom (2023), and was the basis for a stage in the fighting game Super Smash Bros. Ultimate (2018).

== Design and description ==
A map of the Great Plateau as it appears in Breath of the Wild

The Great Plateau serves as the opening area and tutorial for The Legend of Zelda: Breath of the Wild (2017). It is a large elevated landmass from the flat plains below it, up high enough where the player cannot descend from it without dying of fall damage or using the paraglider item. At the start of the game, the player does not have the paraglider, and is therefore confined to the plateau until the tutorial is complete. In contrast to previous Zelda tutorials, which assisted the player greatly and took a large amount of time to complete, the Great Plateau places emphasis on player exploration and experimentation, only giving hints on what to do. How the player goes about completing the objectives of the tutorial is up to choice. Most of the minimal dialogue that the game does provide, such as that from the Old Man at the very beginning, can be ignored without much detriment.

The end goal of the Great Plateau, and what is required to leave the area, is to complete four shrines that teach the player how to use different abilities provided to them on their Sheikah Slate. As the player explores throughout the Great Plateau on their way to these shrines, they are introduced to multiple of Breath of the Wild's other core mechanics. These include cooking, weather and temperature management, stamina, and object physics. Examples of scenarios centered around these mechanics include boulders next to enemy camps, which the player can push to crush the enemies below, and an area that is normally too cold to travel through without cooking specific food items or wearing clothes that grant cold temperature resistance.

Significant structures on the plateau are the Shrine of Resurrection—where the player character Link first awakens and the game begins, and the Great Plateau Tower. The plateau also features the Temple of Time, a recurring Zelda locale. The placement and depiction of the Temple of Time is similar to its appearance in The Legend of Zelda: Ocarina of Time (1998), and Breath of the Wild's iteration is implied to be the same structure, now in ruins.

== Appearances ==
=== Main series ===
The Great Plateau acts as the beginning of Breath of the Wild, with Link awakening in the Shrine of Resurrection. From there, he meets the Old Man, and is guided to complete the plateau's four shrines. The Old Man promises him that, should he complete all four shrines, then he gives the player a paraglider to safely leave the plateau. When Link completes the task, he is invited by the Old Man to meet him on top of the Temple of Time. The Old Man reveals himself to be the spirit of King Rhoam, the former and final King of Hyrule. He tells Link about the Great Calamity, an event that led to the destruction of the Kingdom of Hyrule one hundred years ago at the hands of Calamity Ganon and almost killing Link before Princess Zelda placed him in the Shrine of Resurrection, where Link slept until his awakening. Rhoam tells Link that he must destroy Ganon and save Zelda, where to go to continue his journey, and gives him the paraglider, before fading away. If the player owns the game's Champions' Ballad expansion, then the Great Plateau also becomes the starting area for the expansion's central quest.

The full Breath of the Wild map, including the Great Plateau, returns in the game's sequel, Tears of the Kingdom (2023). Though largely the same and untouched compared to other parts of the map, certain parts of the plateau were changed for the game; the Shrine of Resurrection is tweaked, and some chasms that lead to the game's underground areas have been added. These chasms are in the place of the former Breath of the Wild shrines. While the game does not offer much content specifically for the Great Plateau, it features one new side quest known as "A Call from the Depths", where players have to return four stone eyes to a statue located below the Temple of Time.

=== Other games ===
The Great Plateau appears in the spin-off game, Hyrule Warriors: Age of Calamity (2020), in the game's seventh chapter. The Great Plateau Tower appears as a stage in Super Smash Bros. Ultimate (2018).

== Reception ==
The Great Plateau was acclaimed by multiple video game journalists for its design, presentation, and deviation from preceding video game tutorials. Jim Norman of Nintendo Life said that the location has become considered "something of a World 1-1-like tutorial masterclass". IGN deemed the Great Plateau as one of the greatest tutorials in any video games, stating that, despite being relatively small compared to the rest of the game, it was an "absorbing slice of the game" that was rich in detail and introduces core mechanics to understand the rest of it, before finally revealing the game's greater map and showing the player how much more the game had to offer. Oli Welsh of Polygon deemed it "one of the all-time great game openings". He praised the Great Plateau's presentation and differences from tutorials in previous Zelda games, and traditional video game tutorials in general. He described it as a "self-contained adventure that also serves as a tutorial", and one that "explodes preconceived notions of what a tutorial can be and what the game is going to do". He also praised how the Great Plateau presented the game's core mechanics and exploration aspect in a relatively small area of the map.

Kyle Gratton of ScreenRant compared the Great Plateau to previous Zelda opening areas, which he felt generally had too much dialogue and plot exposition, and declared it the best Zelda tutorial for its design approach. He praised the tutorial's approach of granting the player "limited but dynamic abilities". In contrast to those longer, previous tutorials, he said that the Great Plateau "allows the player to play the game". Another writer for Polygon, Ryan Gilliam, declared the Great Plateau the "best tutorial ever made", describing it as a miniature version of Breath of the Wild that offered only a little bit of each of the game's mechanics, but enough to excite the player for the rest of the game and prepare them for the adventure ahead.

Discussing the location's reappearance in Tears of the Kingdom, Norman described it as a "bit quieter" compared to the rest of the map. While the rest of the map had been overrun with enemies and somewhat altered from its original appearance in Breath of the Wild, the Great Plateau was left largely unchanged, which Norman praised, writing that the location being kept mostly as it was allowed him to "stroll down memory lane", and that it offered "moments of nostalgia where a smile can't help but creep across your face when you get to see an area that you know so well in a brand new light". Welsh described traveling back to the Great Plateau in Tears of the Kingdom as the "most thrilling adventure" he had in the game up to that point, and that revisiting the location from this new perspective gave him a "powerful feeling", one stronger than he would've gotten exploring a completely new area, and compared the experience to "going back to a childhood haunt".
