= The Legend of Zelda: Skyward Sword =

2011 video game

- Developer: Nintendo EAD (Note: Additional development support by Monolith Soft. Skyward Sword HD was developed by Tantalus Media.)
- Publisher: Nintendo
- Director: Hidemaro Fujibayashi
- Producer: Eiji Aonuma
- Programmers: Toshio Iwawaki; Kazuaki Morita
- Artists: Ryuji Kobayashi; Takumi Wada
- Writers: Naoki Mori; Hidemaro Fujibayashi
- Composers: Hajime Wakai; Shiho Fujii; Mahito Yokota; Takeshi Hama
- Series: The Legend of Zelda
- Platforms: Wii; Nintendo Switch
- Release: Wii; EU: November 18, 2011; NA: November 20, 2011; JP: November 23, 2011; AU: November 24, 2011 Nintendo Switch; WW: July 16, 2021
- Genre: Action-adventure
- Mode: Single-player

The Legend of Zelda: Skyward Sword (Note: Japanese: ゼルダの伝説 スカイウォードソード, Hepburn: Zeruda no Densetsu: Sukaiwōdo Sōdo) is a 2011 action-adventure game developed and published by Nintendo for the Wii. A mainline entry in The Legend of Zelda series, Skyward Sword is the first game in the Zelda timeline, and details the origins of the Triforce and the Master Sword. The series main protagonist Link, a resident of a floating town called Skyloft, sets out to rescue his childhood friend Zelda after she is kidnapped and brought to the abandoned lands below the clouds. As Link, players navigate Skyloft and the lands below it, completing quests that advance the story and solving environmental and dungeon-based puzzles. The mechanics and combat, the latter focusing on attacking and blocking with sword and shield, are reliant on the Wii MotionPlus peripheral.

Development took around five years, beginning after the release of Twilight Princess in 2006. Multiple earlier Zelda games influenced the developers, including Twilight Princess, Ocarina of Time and Majora's Mask. Many aspects of the game's overworld and gameplay were designed to streamline and populate the experience for players. The art style was influenced by the work of impressionist and post-impressionist painters, including Paul Cézanne. The implementation of Wii MotionPlus proved problematic for the developers, to the point where it was nearly discarded. It was the first Zelda game to use a live orchestra for the majority of its tracks, with music composed by a team led by Hajime Wakai and supervised by Koji Kondo.

Announced in 2009, Skyward Sword was planned for release in 2010 but was delayed to November 2011 to further refine and expand it. It was a critical and commercial success, receiving perfect scores from multiple journalistic sites, winning and receiving nominations for numerous industry and journalist awards, and selling over three million copies worldwide. However, critics and series fans expressed criticism over its excessive linearity and backtracking, its motion controls, a general lack of innovation in the gameplay and were divided on its narrative choices. Feedback on the game later influenced the development of future Zelda games, including A Link Between Worlds and the next entry for home consoles Breath of the Wild.

A high-definition remaster of the game, The Legend of Zelda: Skyward Sword HD, was co-developed by Tantalus Media and released for the Nintendo Switch in July 2021. As of March 2022, the remaster had sold nearly 4 million units worldwide.

== Gameplay ==
Link flies on his Loftwing bird through the sky. The game's visuals were inspired by artists such as Paul Cézanne, while its controls were tailored exclusively for the Wii MotionPlus.

The Legend of Zelda: Skyward Sword is an action-adventure video game in which players take on the role of series protagonist Link through a series of overworlds populated by monsters and navigating dungeons featuring puzzles and further enemies including dedicated bosses. Link is controlled using the Wii Remote and Nunchuk, and the Wii MotionPlus expansion device is required to play. The greater majority of gameplay mechanics revolve around use of motion controls: these include camera control with the Nunchuck and general hotkey actions and movement linked to the Remote. Jumping across gaps and scaling ledges happen automatically within context. The Nunchuck is also used to make Link perform a forward roll. In addition to his standard pace, Link can sprint for short distances. Sprinting and other actions such as climbing and carrying heavy objects are limited by a stamina meter, which recharges after a few seconds when not performing actions that drain it. When depleted entirely, Link's movement speed is reduced and he is left vulnerable until the meter refills. Standard navigation takes place from a third-person perspective, while the Dowsing search function switches to a first-person view: Dowsing scans an area for a selected object, with new Dowsing objectives appearing depending on game context.

Fighting enemies, which appear in both the overworld and dungeons, relies on Link's use of his sword and shield. Link's sword movements are mapped to the direction the Wii Remote is swung by the player, and other moves include a forward thrust and a stab. Enemy movements are designed to anticipate and block Link's combat movements. By raising the Wii Remote, the sword gathers energy which can be unleashed in a Skyward Strike. Skyward Strikes can be used to trigger certain switches, damage enemies, and activate goddess cubes, which unlock chests in Skyloft and nearby sky islands. The shield is controlled with the Nunchuck: when the shield is raised, it can be used to block attacks. Spin attacks and Finishing Blows are performed by swinging the Wii Remote and Nunchuck at the same time. Link's health is represented with hearts, with Link taking damage whenever he is hit: if he loses all hearts, the game ends.

The game is set on the floating island of Skyloft and surrounding airborne islands, and the three surface regions where the majority of the main adventure takes place. Side quests for the town's citizens are unlocked as the game progresses. The different areas of the surface are accessed through portals, or columns of light, in the clouds. Side quests for characters of the surface are also available and are sometimes mandatory for completing the main quest. The sky is navigated with a giant Shoebill-like bird called a Loftwing, while the Surface is navigated on foot and sometimes by other means, such as swimming. Beacons can be placed on the map for Link to follow, and save points in the form of bird statues preserve Link's progress up to that point both in the sky and on the surface. During his quest, Link is aided by the sword spirit Fi, who can give hints to the player for both environmental elements and enemies: for example, when an enemy is targeted and Fi is summoned, she will give the enemy's characteristics and weaknesses.

Traditional series items such as bombs used for demolition and the bow and arrow for ranged attacks are available as Link progresses through the game, along with new additions such as a mechanical beetle that flies to areas beyond Link's reach for a variety of actions including activating switches, and a whip for grabbing otherwise-unreachable objects and levers. In a series first, shields – aside from the Hylian shield – take damage when the player does not perform a shield parry appropriately; while players are able to repair damaged shields, after a certain amount of damage the shield will break permanently. Items and equipment can be optionally upgraded using materials gathered from defeated monsters, scavenged from different overworld regions, or found in chests in the sky and on the surface. In addition to consuming resources, Link must also pay for the upgrade with Rupees, the game's currency which is scattered throughout the world.

== Plot ==
Skyward Sword takes place at the beginning of the Zelda continuity: according to legend, three ancient Goddesses bestowed a great wish-granting power: the Triforce. The Demon King Demise laid waste to much of the land seeking to take the Triforce. The Goddess Hylia gathered the survivors and sent them into the sky, allowing her to launch a full-scale offensive against Demise. She was victorious, but the land was severely damaged. Uncounted years later, the outcrop is known as Skyloft, and its people believe the surface below is a myth. (Note: Fi: This is a tale you humans have passed down through uncounted generations... It tells of a war of unmatched scale and ferocity, the likes of which would never be seen again. One dark, fateful day, the earth cracked wide and malevolent forces rushed forth from the fissure. They mounted a brutal assault upon the surface people, driving the land into deep despair... They burnt forest to ash, choked the land’s sweet springs, and murdered without hesitation. They did all this in their lust to take the ultimate power protected by Her Grace, the goddess. The power she guarded was without equal. Handed down by gods of old, this power gave its holder the means to make any desire a reality. Such was the might of the ultimate power that the old ones placed in the care of the goddess. To prevent this great power from falling into the hands of the evil swarming the lands... The goddess gathered the surviving humans on an outcropping of earth. She sent it skyward, beyond the reach of the demonic hordes. Beyond even the clouds. With the humans safe, the goddess joined forces with the land dwellers and fought the evil forces, sealing them away. At last, peace was restored to the surface. This is a tale that you humans have told for many ages, generation to generation... But there are other legends, long hidden away from memory, that are intertwined with this tale. Now, a new legend bound to this great story stands ready to be revealed. A legend that will be forged by your own hand.)

In the present, knight-in-training Link passes his final exam despite attempted interference by his class rival Groose, who considers himself a romantic rival for Link's childhood friend Zelda. After passing the exam and on a celebratory flight together, Zelda is whisked away below the clouds by a dark tornado. After recovering back on Skyloft, Link is led into the island's statue of Hylia to the Goddess Sword by Fi, the spirit of the sword who resides within it. Link draws the sword, showing himself to be the prophesied hero who will finally destroy Demise. Opening a way through the clouds to the surface, Link is guided by Fi to the Sealed Temple, where he meets an old woman who tells him to track Zelda: this leads Link across the regions of Faron Woods, Eldin Volcano, and the Lanayru Desert. While he catches up with Zelda, he is prevented from returning her to Skyloft by Impa, a young woman guarding and guiding Zelda. Link also encounters Ghirahim, a self-proclaimed Demon Lord working towards freeing Demise. At the Temple of Time in the Lanayru Desert, Link defends Zelda and Impa from Ghirahim, buying the two enough time to depart through a Gate of Time into the past, which Impa destroys as they pass through.

Returning to the Sealed Temple, Link is followed by Groose and the two end up on the surface together. Link then has to defeat the Imprisoned, a monstrous form of Demise attempting to reach the Sealed Temple, after the old woman shows him a second, albeit dormant, Gate of Time. With the Imprisoned defeated, Link sets out to improve the Goddess Sword by passing trials set by the ancient Goddesses and using their gifts to find three Sacred Flames to purify and strengthen the blade so the Time Gate can be awakened. Link tempers the blade with the Sacred Flames, turning it into the Master Sword. Returning to find the Imprisoned attempting to break free, Link reseals it with help from Groose. Activating the Gate of Time and traveling to the past, he finds Zelda and learns that she is the mortal reincarnation of Hylia; Hylia could not kill Demise and was too weakened from their battle to fend him off again, so she created the Goddess Sword and reincarnated as a mortal to find someone who would fulfill her duty by using the Triforce to wish Demise's destruction, as only mortals can use the artifact. Zelda then seals herself inside a crystal to strengthen Demise's seal, but not before blessing the Master Sword to unlock its true form and gain the power to vanquish Demise and to repel evil. (Note: Zelda: The old gods created a supreme power that gave anyone who possessed it the ability to shape reality and fulfill any desire. They called it: The Triforce. In his thirst to make the world his own, Demise readied a massive army of monsters for war. He sought to take the Triforce for himself by force. [...] After a long and fierce battle, the goddess, Hylia, succeeded in sealing away Demise. However, soon after the demon king was imprisoned, it became clear that the seal would not hold long against his fearsome power. Hylia had suffered grave injuries in her battle with the demon king. She knew that if he broke free again, there would be no stopping him. And if the demon king were to free himself, it would mean the end of the world for all beings of this land. To put an end to the demon king, Hylia devised two separate plans and set them both into motion. First, she created Fi. She made the spirit that resides in your sword to serve a single purpose: to assist her chosen hero on his mission. Her second plan... was to abandon her divine form and transfer her soul to the body of a mortal. ...She made this sacrifice, as you have likely guessed so that the supreme power created by the old gods could one day be used. For while the supreme power of the Triforce was created by the gods, all of its power can never be wielded by one. Knowing this power was her last and only hope, the goddess gave up her divine powers and her immortal form. You've probably figured it out by now, haven't you, Link? You are the chosen hero, and I, Zelda... I am the goddess reborn as a mortal. We must stop [Demise] from freeing himself from the seal that imprisons him. At any cost... That is why I intend to remain here in this time and place... To sustain the seal as best as I can. As long as I continue this vigil, we may be able to prevent the demon king from fully reviving himself in our own time.)

Link locates the Triforce on Skyloft and uses it to destroy Demise. With Demise dead, Zelda is freed, but Ghirahim arrives and kidnaps Zelda: though Demise is dead in the present, Ghirahim intends to use Zelda as a sacrifice to resurrect him in the past. (Note: Ghirahim: My master may have perished in this age, but in the past, he lives yet! I'm taking the girl back through that gate to help me revive the demon king!) Link pursues Ghirahim into the past and fights through his army. He then defeats Ghirahim, who turns out to be the spirit of Demise's sword. However, Link is unable to prevent Zelda from being used to reincarnate Demise's humanoid form. Groose guards Zelda's body while Link challenges Demise. Link triumphs and absorbs Demise's essence into the True Master Sword, but not before Demise curses Link and Zelda's bloodlines to be haunted by an incarnation of his hatred. (Note: This is a reference to Ganondorf, the main antagonist of almost Zelda games.) (Note: Demise: Extraordinary. You stand as a paragon of your kind, human. You fight like no man or demon I have ever known. Though this is not the end. My hate... never perishes. It is born anew in a cycle with no end! I will rise again! Those like you... Those who share the blood of the goddess and the spirit of the hero... They are eternally bound to this curse. An incarnation of my hatred shall ever follow your kind, dooming them to wander a blood-soaked sea of darkness for all time!) To complete the True Master Sword's seal, Fi tells Link that he must drive it into a pedestal in the Sealed Temple; Link does so, with Fi accepting eternal slumber as a result. Groose, Link and Zelda return to their time while Impa remains behind and destroys the Gate of Time, as she is a person of that time and must watch over the True Master Sword. (Note: Impa: Zelda, Your Grace, you possess the memories of the goddess. You must understand why that is not possible. I am a being of this age. My place is here. / Zelda: I... I know that, but... / Impa: You must return to your own time. I will take care of the gate once you have passed through. / Zelda: I... can't do that. You and I have been through so much together. I don't want to leave you alone. Please, Impa. Come back with us. / Impa: Zelda, at the command of the goddess, I passed through the Gate of Time, I did so to protect you and aid the fight to prevent the world's destruction. The last remnants of Demise are decaying slowly within the sword. Someone must stay behind to watch over this blade. His spirit must not reawaken. He must never be allowed to threaten the world again.) In the present, the old woman greets them one last time before she dies and vanishes, revealing that she was Impa. The game ends with the surface now freely accessible to the residents of Skyloft, where Zelda decides to remain in order to watch over the Triforce. (Note: Zelda: Look around us! As a child, I always dreamed of a world below. I wanted to see the surface with my own eyes and feel the land's warm breeze on my skin. I... I think I want to live here. I always want to feel solid ground beneath my feet, see the clouds above my head, and watch over the Triforce. What about you, Link? What will you do now?)

== Development ==
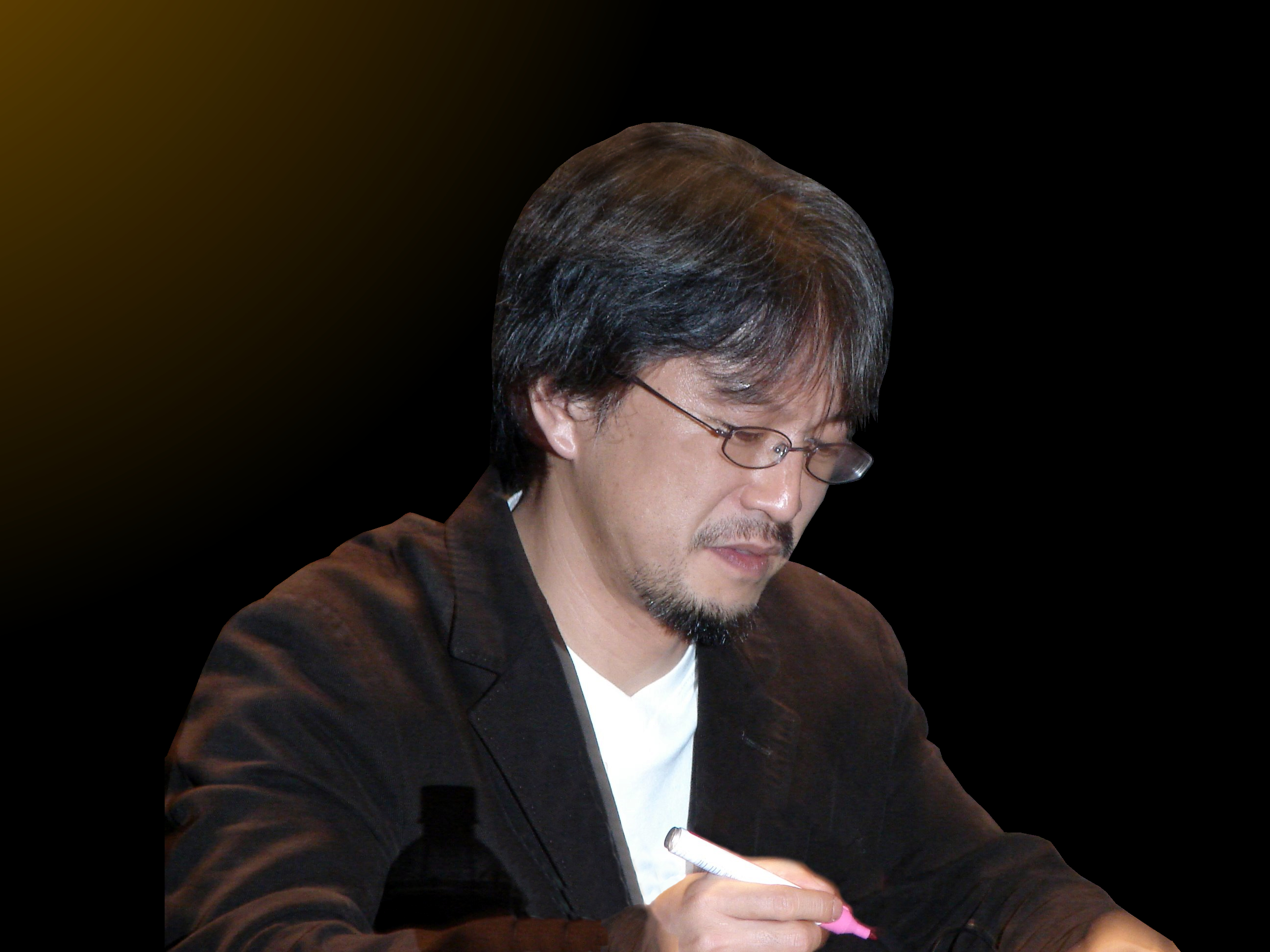
Skyward Sword producer Eiji Aonuma at the 2007 Game Developers Conference

Skyward Sword's development began in 2006, after the release of Twilight Princess for GameCube and Wii. It was developed by Nintendo Entertainment Analysis & Development, a development division of series publisher Nintendo. They were assisted in development by the Kyoto branch of Monolith Soft. Its producer was Eiji Aonuma, a major contributor to the Legend of Zelda series. His main preoccupation during these early stages was whether the developers could continue creating The Legend of Zelda games using the same development mindset that had been used up to Twilight Princess. The game's director was Hidemaro Fujibayashi: previously working as assistant director on Phantom Hourglass for the Nintendo DS, Skyward Sword was his first project for home consoles. He began work on Skyward Sword after finishing Phantom Hourglass, and continued working on the game alongside his work on Spirit Tracks. When Spirit Tracks was finished, Fujibayashi and the game's development team transferred back to working on Skyward Sword.

According to Aonuma, the team's starting point for development was the Wii version of Twilight Princess: feeling they had not fully realized their goal of creating a vast and realistic world with Twilight Princess, they used their previous work as a foundation for the next game. They also sought to create a memorable experience equivalent to The Legend of Zelda: Ocarina of Time, by that time considered the series' most memorable game. Development lasted around five years, and according to series producer Shigeru Miyamoto, the game's budget was considered quite high for a Nintendo project. The development time was initially estimated at three years, but difficulties and changes in the game's development extended development time by a further two years: despite this, Miyamoto felt that this was not wasted development time as the first two years went into experimentation. By June 2011, the game was complete aside from fine-tuning and balancing its mechanics.

=== Scenario ===
The script for cinematic scenes was written by Naoki Mori, who joined the project for one and a quarter years in his role: the cinematic director was Shigeki Yoshida, who was brought on at the same time and worked on the storyboards with Mori. The initial script was proposed by Fujibayashi based on his perception of the game's structure. As the game's theme was the use of the sword, and the sword most associated with the series was the Master Sword, the team decided to make it an origin story for the weapon. An early element was whether to incorporate the creation of Hyrule, while also needing to explain the creation of Skyloft: this initial stage of story development ended up being difficult as their initial story plans were full of contradictions to established series lore due to them wanting to create an origin story for the entire series. These issues were further complicated by the third year of development with the necessity of finalizing the gameplay and environments. Feigning illness, Fujibayashi shut himself away in a hotel room and wrote the synopsis in a single day. Mori wrote the dialogue based on Fujibayashi's synopsis, who needed to work out the fine details with Fujibayashi. A scene Fujibayashi was intent on including was where Zelda jumped from the edge of Skyloft and Link caught her: this was fitted in for the two characters after the end of Link's exam. The early part of the story was quite different from earlier Zelda games, playing out in a similar way to a school drama. Once the script was finished, it was handed to Yoshida so his team could create the cinematics. The total number of cinematics was estimated as 79, coming to over 120 minutes.

The relationship between Link and Zelda was quite different from earlier incarnations; in particular, the fact that Zelda was not royalty. According to Aonuma, a recurring difficulty was how contrived the necessity for Link to rescue Zelda became with each passing installment, as their contact may only have been fleeting beforehand. In response to this, the team considered how to make the player care about Zelda and want to rescue her. Having the two characters as childhood friends served this purpose and cut down on extraneous plot elements. They continued to encourage the player by having Link only just miss her on her early travels across the Surface. Mischievous elements were also added to Zelda's personality by her pushing Link over a ledge: initially intended as a rule of three-style gag, it was cut down to two during development. The figure of Hylia was a new addition to the world's lore, although her existence was linked to Zelda, with the two being essentially the same character known under different names in subsequent ages. Groose, who acted as Link's rival, was introduced to make the story more interesting within the school setting. Groose's maturation during the story was intended to help convey Link's parallel growth as a character as he was otherwise mute and static.

Fi was created before the implementation of Wii MotionPlus when she was going to be part of some different undefined gameplay concepts unrelated to motion control. Her design was based on the design of the Master Sword, referencing her origins as the sword's spirit. She also served as an alternate explanatory voice as Link was a silent protagonist. According to staff, Fi's technical dialogue for each area of the game was written by different people, verbal inconsistencies arose that needed addressing, so Fujibayashi adjusted them all so she sounded consistent. Nearly all of Fi's dialogue was ultimately written by Fujibayashi. Ghirahim was designed to be similar to the Dark Link character from Ocarina of Time: he could read Link's movements, requiring players to think strategically to defeat him rather than simply swinging Link's sword around randomly. Character designs were far more detailed than in previous Zelda games. Clothing was frequently designed to complement backgrounds, such as Zelda's pink and red dress in the opening. The game's use of warm colors and brushstroke-like aesthetics was inspired by impressionist artwork, pioneered in the 19th century by painters such as Claude Monet: a particular element cited by Miyamoto was the sky, which he called a tribute to post-impressionist Paul Cézanne's work. The basic starting point for the art style was that it was a fantasy world. The final version was referred to as a balance between the cartoon styling of The Wind Waker and Twilight Princess, where the cartoon shading was transferred onto an older version of Link. The team settled this art style as it would properly portray the more exaggerated actions of some characters and general swordplay while preserving Link's mature appearance.

=== Design ===
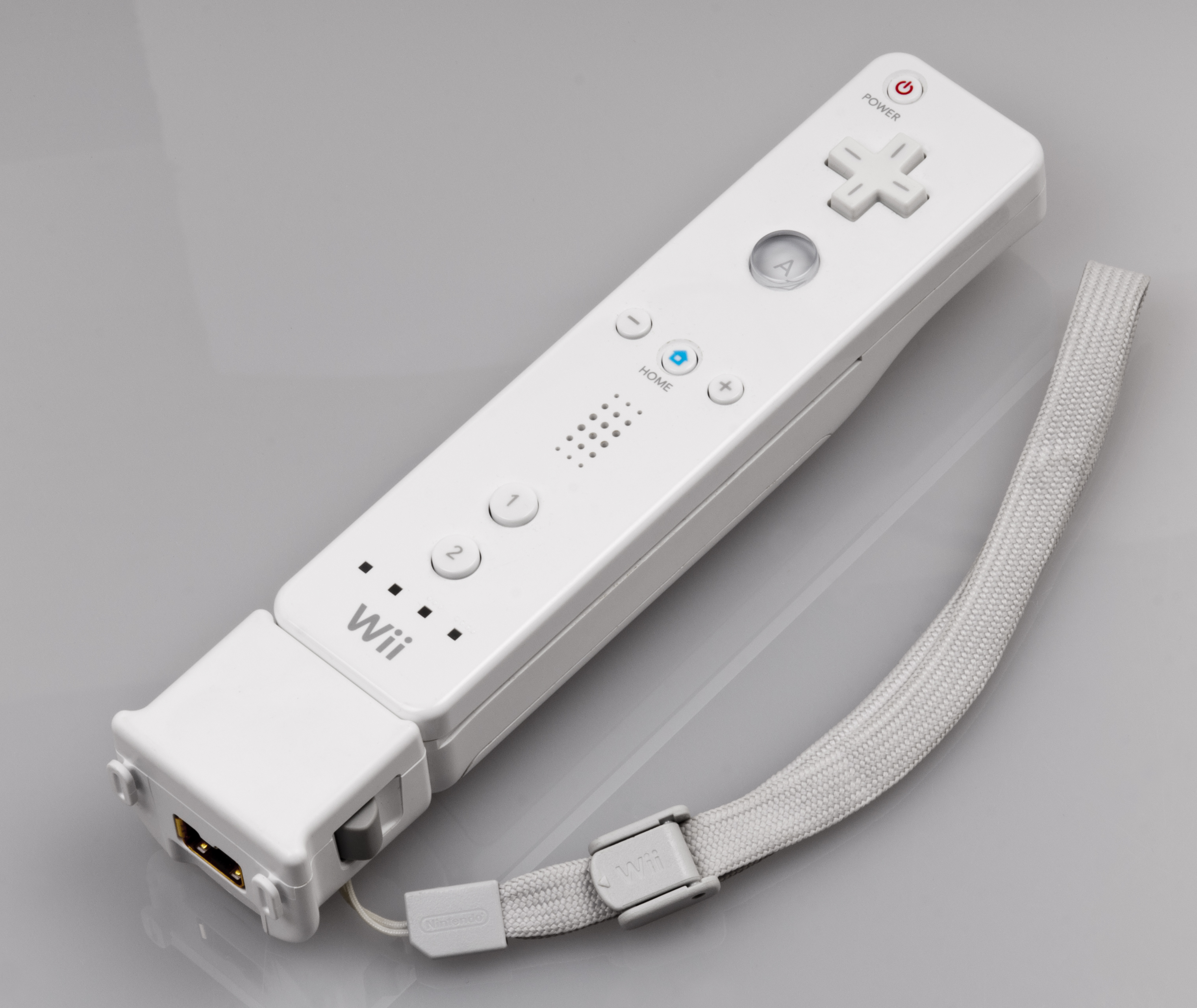
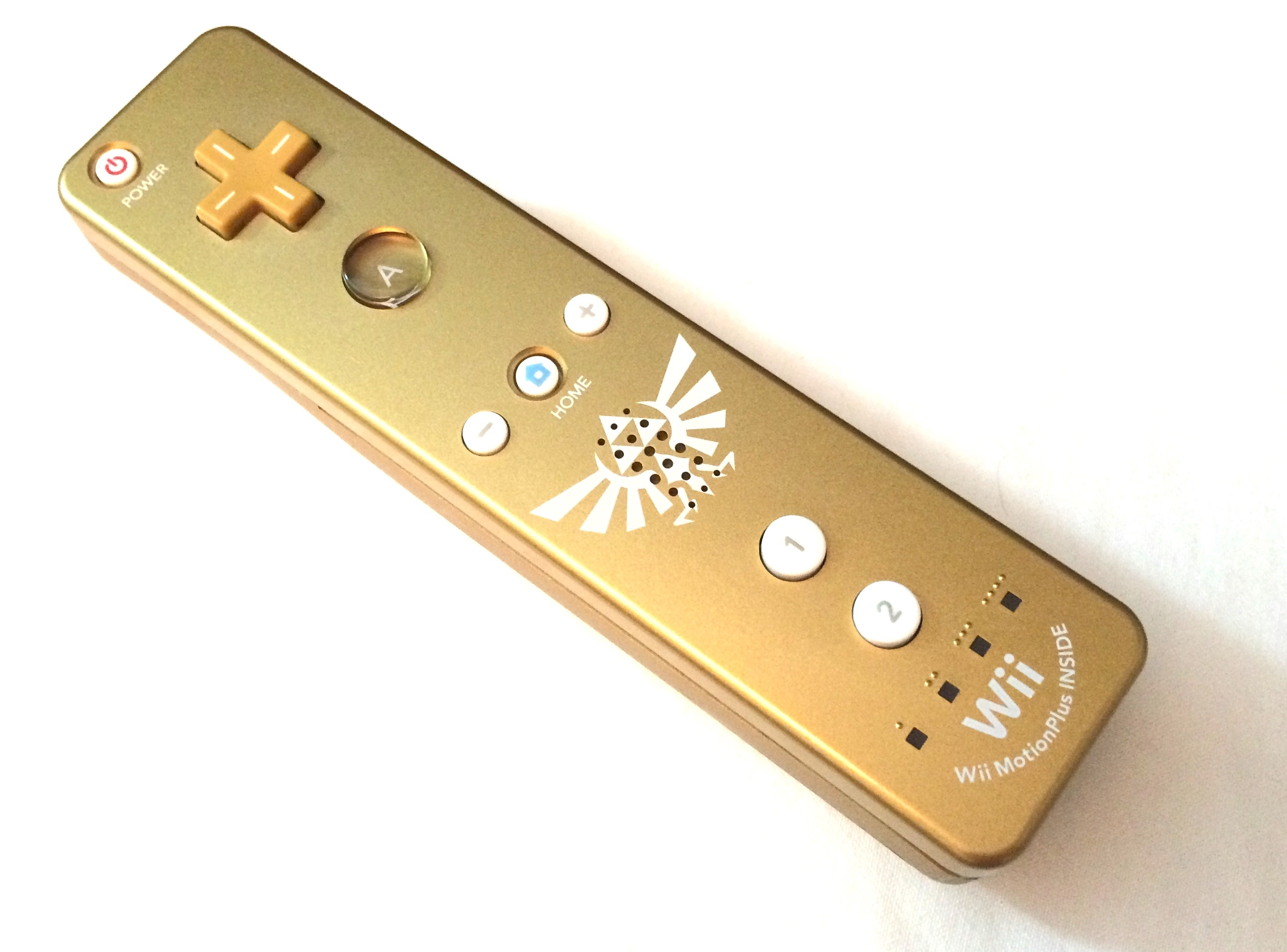
Despite early difficulties implementing it, the gameplay of Skyward Sword made extensive use of the Wii MotionPlus (top, on Wii remote), resulting in multiple design elements revolving around its use. A golden Zelda-themed Wii remote (bottom) was released as tie-in for the game, with built-in Wii MotionPlus functionality.

During development, the team faced a lot of problems when designing the game so it would be both familiar for series fans and fresh to old and new players. The pieces of gameplay experimentation meant that the development was "a more fundamental ground-up process" than earlier games such as The Wind Waker. Their earlier games had involved lifting elements from earlier games and pasting them into a new entry, but for Skyward Sword the developers wanted to add a new play structure to avoid fans seeing it as more of the same. The original concept for gameplay using the Wii MotionPlus was proposed by Fujibayashi at a point when the team was already developing the gameplay around the console's standard Wii Remote and Nunchuk control scheme. When first proposed, Aonuma was highly enthusiastic, and his wish to change to Wii MotionPlus meant that work on the game needed to begin all over again. The use of Wii MotionPlus proved challenging for the developers to implement, to the point where at one point Aonuma seriously considered dropping it from the game entirely. After the release of Wii Sports Resort, the team saw how motion controls could be used for swordplay: after talking with the development team, they were able to borrow the technology and used it to create the motion-driven swordplay. The implementation of Wii MotionPlus meant that the enemy artificial intelligence needed to be able to counter it, adjusting their stances depending on the position of Link's sword.

When creating Link's sword movements, the team initially wanted them to be as realistic as possible, but because it was detrimental to the character's portrayal, they had to include unrealistic movements to preserve the atmosphere. The Skyward Strike was initially born from Aonuma thinking up a possible mechanic of holding the sword above Link: these also gave rise to the game's title. Having sword fighting relying on Wii MotionPlus freed up other buttons on the controller, allowing the addition of the Dash sprinting option. So as not to interrupt the flow of gameplay, they incorporated other elements into the Dash function, such as scaling walls rather than just slamming into them. The Dowsing mechanic was created early on, based on the gameplay themes of discovery and exploration. Due to the introduction of Dowsing, the team did not have to create environmental landmarks for places and objects of importance as they had done in previous games. So players would not get lost in the terrain, they also introduced the marker beacons. Items were designed so they could be visible in any area, such as the bright blue Bombs. They were also designed based on their original location: those from Skyloft used a bird motif, while those from other Surface regions used more intricate designs. The Beetle acted as a replacement for the boomerang, as the team wanted an item that players could control. The Beetle and other pseudo-technical items gave rise to the ancient mechanical theme that appeared in the Lanayru Desert region. At Miyamoto's insistence, the more desirable items that were normally placed towards the end of a campaign were made available to players from an early stage. When designing items, the developers were faced with the usual problems of the interdependence of items and dungeons creating a chicken-and-egg scenario for the developers. The menu for Item access was also redesigned around the use of Wii MotionPlus.

In past Zelda games, the team had made numerous new fields for player exploration; however, this time, they limited the number of overworlds to three and expanded their content so players would be able to fully appreciate them through repeated visits. The team also created the world based on their experiences with Twilight Princess: feeling that the overworld and dungeons were too large with puzzles too thinly dispersed, the team both sought to compact areas and have environmental puzzles in the overworld. The biggest difficulty was ensuring that players could reach areas quickly while still discovering new features and puzzles. The creation of the Skyloft overworld was due to difficulties connecting the three Surface-based overworlds due to drastically contrasting environments. The sky was initially going to be presented similar to the course selection screen from the Super Mario series, but this was changed to an overworld with its own quests and population so Link had a place where he could prepare for his adventures. An initial idea, when jumping down from the sky seemed unlikely to be approved, was to have a huge tower acting as a central hub, with the height at which Link jumped lengthening the duration of his free fall. Once the concept of traveling from the sky had been chosen instead, the Loftwing mounts were created so it looked and felt more rational to players. These overlapping gameplay mechanics triggered the creation of Skyloft, along with elements of the early game such as the Knight Academy. The continual movements and routines of Skyloft's people were modeled after similar time-driven mechanics from The Legend of Zelda: Majora's Mask, with similar links between character-specific side quests and the main narrative. Despite the aerial element, the mechanics necessary for free navigation meant a Loftwing racing minigame could not be implemented.

Each Surface overworld had a specific theme: the forest overworld revolved around landforms altering gameplay, the volcano overworld focused around changing the rules of gameplay, while the desert overworld was themed around duality between past and present. The first areas, the Sealed Grounds and Faron Woods, were created so players could be eased into the game's mechanics and navigation. While the forest areas were made to be mostly flat, the Eldin Volcano overworld was made with height differences in mind to provide a greater challenge. Elements in the volcano terrain included areas of lava and slopes where Link's sprinting ability would become necessary for reaching new areas. For the Lanayru Desert, the team created three different overworld zones due to its unique time-shifting mechanics, triggered with Time Shift stones: this shifting between different zones was inspired by similar systems in Ocarina of Time and Twilight Princess. The portable Time Shift stones were one of many ideas included in the desert overworld as they did not fit with the forest or volcano environments. A difficult feature to include naturally was the remnants of Lanayru's Ancient Civilization, which used electricity to power both its technology and citizens. Enemy types that recurred in all Surface-based overworld areas were given slightly altered designs so they would be unique to each overworld. The Silent Realms were created as a new mechanic, filled with enemies that could not be defeated and relying on Link's sprinting ability rather than his weapons or items. While they had experimented with indestructible enemies in Phantom Hourglass and Spirit Tracks, but this time it was changed by restricting Link's options and actions. They also created a time limit for added strategy, as knowledge of the areas where the Spirit Realms were located was key to completing them. This was also why they were set up in areas players would already be familiar with. They were originally in the form of special dungeons, but this was discarded in favor of the familiar areas.

=== Audio ===
The game's sound team consisted of ten people: five handling general sound design, and five handling music composition. Hajime Wakai acted as the game's sound director and lead composer, with the other composers being Shiho Fujii, Mahito Yokota, and Takeshi Hama. Longtime series composer Koji Kondo had a supervisory role, only composing a single piece by himself: the music accompanying the prologue video describing the mythical origins of Demise and Hylia. He also helped in arranging the other composer's pieces, using an electric piano and a Mac computer. Fujii was responsible for the music focused on environments, dungeons, boss battles: among her work was the music for Skyloft. She used art and environmental assets so that her compositions would fit in with their environments. A first for the Zelda series, the music was performed using a live orchestra rather than synthesized instruments. It was the first time Nintendo EAD in Kyoto had used a live orchestra. Any previous orchestral elements in Twilight Princess, which amounted only to one track, were handled by their Tokyo division. Due to his experience, the department's musical lead Yokota was brought on to help orchestrate the score. Aonuma initially did not think of using an orchestra and was still sure the score would remain synthesized even after Wakai asked him about it. An orchestra was finally chosen after Miyamoto insisted upon it, a decision which surprised the entire team.

Using the orchestra enabled a greater expression of emotion, which meant that they used it when creating scores for environments, cinematic scenes, and emotional moments within the story. Conversely, the team was given less freedom to adjust tracks as they had been able to with synthesized tracks. Something new they did for Skyward Sword was producing unique themes for specific characters such as Link and Zelda. They also added people singing songs, another element new to the series. One notable element was the game's main theme "Ballad of the Goddess", which was a retrograde version of the recurring tune "Zelda's Lullaby". Due to the use of an orchestra and the sheer amount of extra work going into the sound design, the music team doubled in size from the standard five-person group, and became the largest sound team at the time to have worked on a Nintendo game. The positive reception of the orchestral score within the company led to the creation of The Legend of Zelda 25th Anniversary Symphony Concert, a celebratory concert featuring orchestrated versions of classic Zelda themes. Music was also woven into the story and gameplay through the use of the harp Link receives, using a recurring theme within the series of music being a central part of the experience. In contrast to previous games, the instrument could be played at any time rather than at specific times and places.

== Release ==
A new Zelda game was first hinted at in April 2008, when Miyamoto stated that the Zelda development team were reforming to create new games. Miyamoto later confirmed at the 2008 Electronic Entertainment Expo (E3) that a new Zelda was in development for the Wii. The game was unveiled at E3 the following year, although its title remained unknown. Due to its in-development state, Miyamoto could not show off gameplay as he had wished. Instead, he showed promotional art featuring Link and Fi. He also announced the game's use of Wii MotionPlus, along with its planned 2010 release window. In a later interview, Aonuma's comments on the game's playability brought this release window into doubt. He also noted that his wish to focus on the new game meant that the release date of Spirit Tracks was shifted to the end of 2009 rather than its initial projected release in early 2010. The game's title was announced at the event, along with its revised release period in 2011 and a playable demonstration. According to Miyamoto, the game was delayed from its planned 2010 release window as the staff felt that they would be releasing an unfinished product if they put the convenience of the company ahead of creating a quality experience. They used the extra year to both finish the core elements and polish up the game as a whole.

Multiple promotional elements were created: a five-part online comic was written and illustrated by Jerry Holkins and Mike Krahulik under their Penny Arcade Presents series, and television commercials featuring actor and comedian Robin Williams and his daughter Zelda were made, playing on the actor's stated love for the series. Skyward Sword was released in all regions in November 2011. The game was released as both a standard edition and a limited deluxe edition that included a gold Wii Remote Plus. An anniversary CD was included with both editions containing orchestrated versions of various iconic musical pieces from the series. Following its release, a glitch was discovered that corrupted save files if three late-game events were taken in a certain order. Once revealed, Nintendo issued instructions on avoiding it and set up a special channel on their Wii site in Japan to gain feedback, along with offering to manually repair corrupted save files. The game was later re-released for the Wii U via the Virtual Console on September 1, 2016, as part of the series' 30th anniversary celebrations.

=== Skyward Sword HD ===
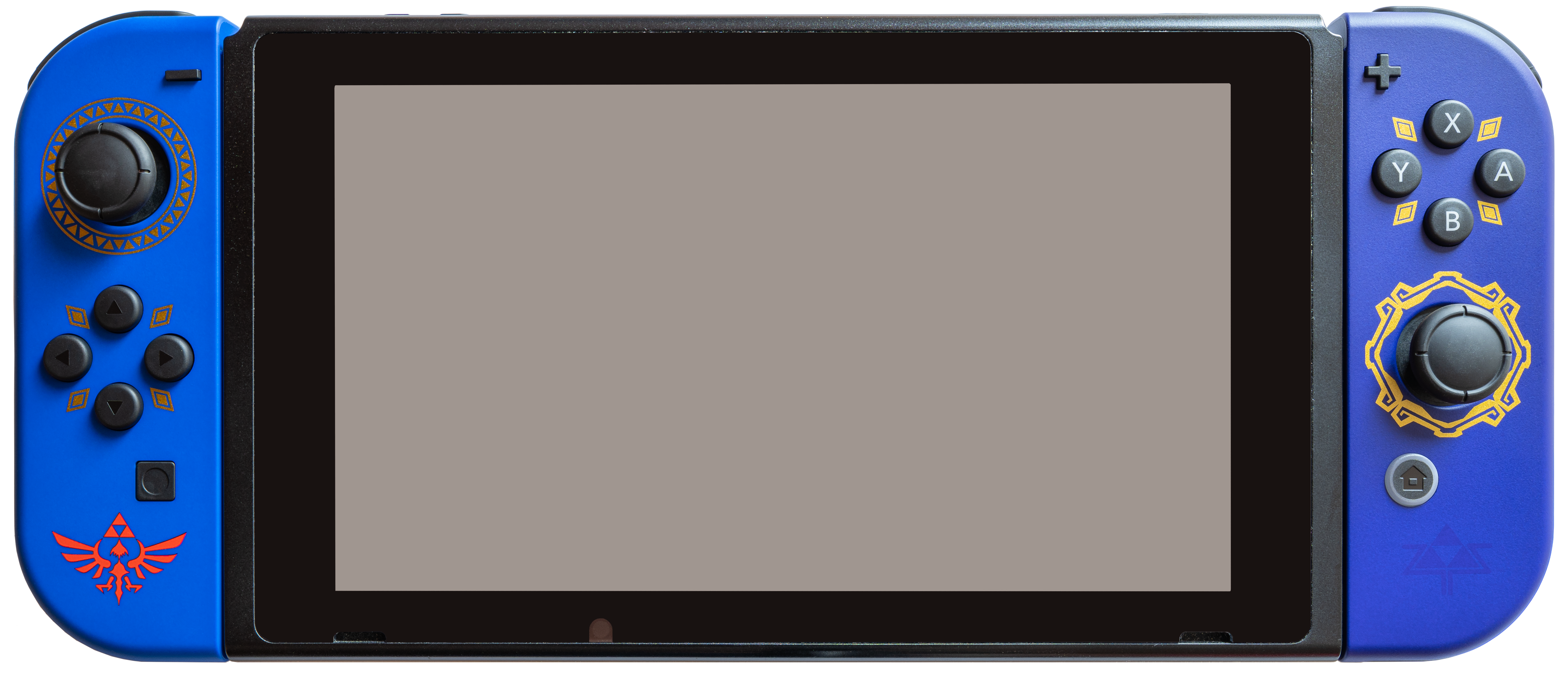
Nintendo Switch console with special edition Joy-Con

The Legend of Zelda: Skyward Sword HD, a high-definition remaster for the Nintendo Switch, was released on July 16, 2021. A Joy-Con pair themed after the Master Sword and Hylian Shield from the game was released separately on the same date.

Aonuma said in June 2016 that it might be possible to create an HD remaster of Skyward Sword for then-current hardware. Years prior, during the development of another entry in the series, Breath of the Wild, Nintendo experimented with an HD version of Skyward Sword running on Wii U development kits when trying to settle on a graphical style for the new game. This ultimately led to the production of The Wind Waker HD, whose success encouraged the Zelda team to pursue other high-definition remasters. Aonuma recognized the interest in a Skyward Sword remaster, though a spokesperson from Nintendo would later clarify to Eurogamer that there were no plans to bring the game to the Nintendo Switch at that time. In August 2020, Amazon UK had listed a Nintendo Switch version of Skyward Sword, though it was delisted soon after.

The remaster features high-definition graphics and runs at 60 frames per second. The remaster features two control schemes, one of which aims to replicate the functions of the Wii Remote Plus and Nunchuck through the motion controls of the Joy-Con, while the other aims to replicate a traditional control scheme by using the right analog stick to control the previously motion-controlled sword. This secondary control method allows the game to be played in handheld mode, on a Pro Controller, and on the Nintendo Switch Lite.

Other new features include autosave, the ability to save to any of the three save files instead of just the original file (which also now includes giving Hero Mode its own slot upon unlocking it as a New Game Plus feature when saved into a file), many of Fi's hints now being optional, the ability to skip dialogue boxes and cutscenes, and item descriptions no longer appearing after the first encounter with an item, with the Gratitude Crystals being the lone exception. One Amiibo figure is supported, being a figure depicting Zelda and a Loftwing enabling fast travel between the sky and the surface.

== Reception ==
Reception

Aggregate scores
Aggregator	Score
Metacritic	93/100 (Note: Based on 81 reviews)
OpenCritic	81% recommend

Review scores
Publication	Score
1Up.com	B+
Destructoid	9.5/10
Edge	10/10
Electronic Gaming Monthly	8.5/10
Eurogamer	10/10
Famitsu	10/10, 10/10, 10/10, 10/10
Game Informer	10/10
GameSpot	7.5/10
GamesRadar+	4.5/5
GameTrailers	9.1/10
IGN	10/10
Joystiq	4.5/5
Nintendo Power	9.5/10
Official Nintendo Magazine	98%
VideoGamer.com	10/10

Skyward Sword received critical acclaim; it has a score of 93/100 on the aggregate site Metacritic, based on 81 reviews. It was the site's 10th highest scoring game of 2011, and ranked as the 6th best-reviewed Wii game. Skyward Sword was the third Zelda game and the sixteenth video game to receive a perfect score from Famitsu. It also received perfect scores from IGN, Eurogamer, Game Informer, Edge, and VideoGamer.com.

Famitsu praised the overworld and gameplay: one reviewer felt that it would form the new standard for the Zelda series and video games as a whole. Edge was positive about all aspects aside from the player-driven upgrade system, and even then it was not enough to spoil the experience for the reviewer. Nintendo Power gave it similar praise, saying that "it's truly worthy of being called 'epic'". Ray Carsillo of Electronic Gaming Monthly appreciated the game's nostalgic value, but found the motion control difficult to handle and kept the game from being truly great. Jose Otero, writing for 1UP.com, praised the developers for putting effort into moving away from Zelda tradition and called it one of the better games in the series, but said that those detrimental elements that remained such as side quests and some item usage made Skyward Sword "a weird middle ground filled with genuine surprises, inessential carry-overs, and copy/paste quest structures".

GameSpot's Tom McShea was notably less positive than other critics, praising the storyline, dungeons, enemies and visuals while faulting the controls for being unreliable and feeling that most of the experience felt both unnecessary and overly familiar. Destructoid's Jonathan Holmes called Skyward Sword his new favorite 3D game from the series, but noted that its exclusive use of motion controls would put off potential players. Oli Welsh of Eurogamer was highly positive, praising the controls, gameplay experience and additional elements such as upgrades: he gave particular praise to the game's visuals, which were impressive despite hardware limitations. Game Informer's Phil Kollar echoed both general praise of the gameplay and presentation, and minor issues experienced with the motion controls: he concluded by saying that Nintendo had fulfilled its initial promises for the Wii with Skyward Sword. GamesRadar's Carolyn Gudmundson called it "A perfectly balanced mix of innovation and classic Zelda gameplay" despite minor control issues.

GameTrailers noted that, despite its many strengths such as a believable relationship between Link and Zelda, Skyward Sword represented the series' "first gray hairs" due to some of its mechanics feeling dated in the modern gaming landscape. IGN's Richard George felt that the game returned The Legend of Zelda to being a revolutionary series in the gaming industry, praising almost every aspect of the game except for the soundtrack, which he felt did not live up to series standards despite its quality. Joystiq writer Griffin McElroy noted that a lot of the game's content seemed unnecessary and extravagant, but said that beneath this surface lay "the best Zelda game of all time". Steve Hogarty of Official Nintendo Magazine shared many points of praise with other positive journalist reviews, calling it the greatest game in the series to date. VideoGamer.com's Chris Schilling called it one of the best Zelda games, praising its motion controls, narrative and treatment of series tradition.

Fi has been met with mostly negative reception. Critics and gamers considered her frequent interjections in gameplay to be annoying, comparing her unfavourably to Navi from Ocarina of Time. She has been criticized for hurting the pace or making the game more annoying to play by critics. Due to her repeated interruptions in the gameplay of Skyward Sword, she has been the subject of various internet memes. Venture Beat writer Sebastian Haley, however, felt she was less annoying, and considered her the best aspect of the game.

Skyward Sword has since been ranked among the best games developed for the Wii. Skyward Sword HD received a score of 81 on Metacritic, indicating "generally favorable" reviews.

=== Awards ===
Following its release, Skyward Sword won numerous awards. At IGN's "Best of 2011" awards, it was awarded "Best Game", "Best Graphics", "Best Sound" and "Best Story" in the Wii category. It was also given the "Reader's Choice" award in the "Best Overall Game" category: it was also among those nominated as the site's "Game of the Year". In Digital Trends' similar awards, it was named as "Best Action-Adventure" and "Best Wii Exclusive", and was nominated for the site's "Game of the Year" award. RPGamer's own "Best of 2011" awards named Skyward Sword "Best Console and PC Game" and awarded it for "Best Music". It also received "Game of the Year" awards from Electronic Gaming Monthly, GameSpot, Edge and Nintendo Power. It received "Excellence" and "Most Valuable Character" awards from Famitsu, the latter being awarded for the protagonist Link. At the Spike Video Game Awards in 2011, the game won "Best Wii Game" and "Best Motion Game".

In 2012, it received multiple nominations at the 15th Annual Interactive Achievement Awards ("Game of the Year", "Adventure Game of the Year", and "Outstanding Achievement in Gameplay Engineering"), Game Developers Choice Awards ("Best Game Design"), and the 8th British Academy Games Awards ("Best Game", "Game Innovation" and fan-voted "GAME Award of 2011").

=== Sales ===
Upon its Japanese debut, Skyward Sword sold nearly 195,000 units, reaching the top of sales charts. Sales quickly declined, dropping out of the Top 20 within a few weeks. By the end of December, it had sold fewer than 320,000 units: this was below equivalent sales for other recent home console and portable Zelda games. The game's sales were strong overall going into January 2012, particularly in North America. It sold about 600,000 units in its first month sin North America. In the UK, Skyward Sword was the seventh best-selling game of November in the multiformat charts, stated as impressive given the waning popularity of the platform. It was also the region's top-selling Wii game during its week of release, supplanting the previous week's top seller Just Dance 3. It failed to reach the top-five best-selling Wii games for that year. Its total worldwide first-week sales came to 919,119 units. According to Nintendo of America president Reggie Fils-Aimé, Skyward Sword was the fastest-selling game in the series at that time. As of March 2012, the game has sold 3.52 million units worldwide: 360,000 of these units were sold in Japan while 3.15 million units were sold overseas. As of December 2020 the game has sold 3.67 million units worldwide.

Pre-orders for Skyward Sword HD sold out on Amazon.com and it was listed as the best-selling game on the US version of the site. It sold 159,089 physical copies within its first week on sale in Japan, making it the bestselling retail game of the week in the country. As of December 2022, Skyward Sword HD had sold 4.15 million units worldwide.

== Legacy ==
While critical reception of the game was very positive overall, fan and retrospective opinions were far more mixed due to its highly traditional and linear structure. When development started on the next home console Zelda game, Breath of the Wild, the developers wanted to improve on what they had achieved with Skyward Sword and the feedback it received from both fans and critics, along with creating a non-linear world based on player complaints about the linearity of Skyward Sword. Aonuma and Fujibayashi both returned respectively as producer and director. Aonuma's said that his wish with Breath of the Wild was "to expand and make a better Skyward Sword". Various publications noted that the sequel to Breath of the Wild, Tears of the Kingdom, contains influences from Skyward Sword. Specifically, the game's incorporation of floating islands above Hyrule kingdom drew comparisons to Skyloft. The developers themselves commented on these comparisons, saying the Switch's hardware allowed them to allow the player to seamlessly travel to the surface from specific areas of the sky, something they were not able to achieve with the Wii's graphical limitations.

Tentalus spencensis, a fossil from the Cambrian Spence Shale of Utah, is named after the Skyward Sword boss Tentalus.
