= Unfinished Portrait =

Unfinished Portrait may refer to:

- Unfinished Portrait (novel), a semi-autobiographical novel written by Agatha Christie
- Unfinished portrait of Franklin D. Roosevelt, a watercolor of President Franklin Delano Roosevelt by Elizabeth Shoumatoff
- Unfinished portrait of General Bonaparte, an unfinished portrait of Napoleon Bonaparte by Jacques-Louis David
- Unfinished portrait of Nathaniel Hurd, an unfinished portrait of Nathaniel Heard by John Singleton Copley
