= Anne Currier =

American ceramist

- Born: 1950 (age 75–76); Louisville, Kentucky
- Known for: Ceramics

Anne Currier (born 1950) is an American ceramist. Currier is known for her abstract ceramic works, which play with positive and negative space.

== Education ==
Currier earned a BFA from the School of the Art Institute of Chicago (1972) and a MFA from the University of Washington (1974).

== Work ==
Many of Currier's works resemble the human form and architectural elements. In an artist statement, Currier revealed that her work was inspired by Greek and Buddhist sculpture. Currier also expressed that the play with visual planes, as found in the Cubist movement, was an inspiration.

She has taught ceramics at both the University of Colorado (1975–1984) and Alfred University (1984–2016). Upon her retirement from Alfred University in 2016, Currier received the title of professor emerita. Her work has gained international attention, and it is included in the collections of the Museum of Fine Arts Houston, the Smithsonian American Art Museum, and the Memorial Art Gallery.

Currier lives and works in Scio, New York.
