= Crested Swans =

Wooden sculpture by Johannes Scholl

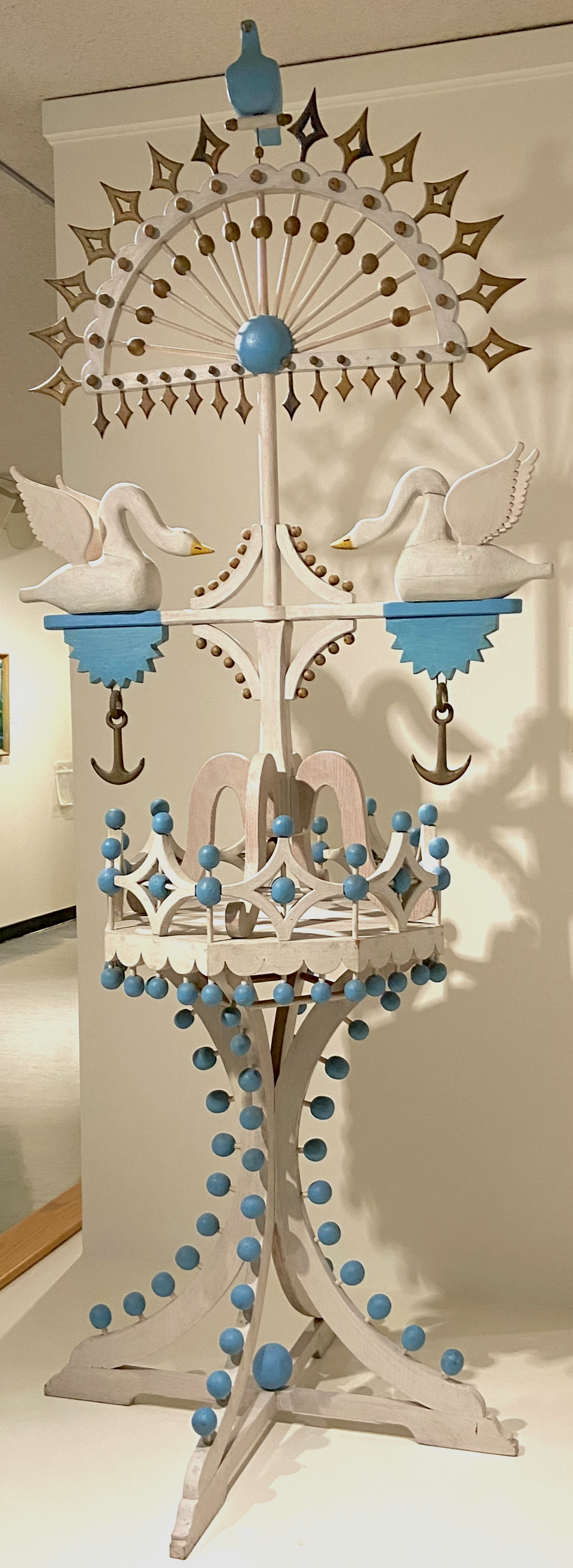
Crested Swans crafted by John Scholl and currently residing at the Memorial Art Gallery of Rochester, New York

Crested Swans is a painted wooden sculpture crafted by Johannes (John) Scholl around 1910. The term “celebration” was coined in reference to Scholl’s larger-than-life sculptures by the Stony Point Folk Art Gallery. Crested Swans was sculpted within the last handful of years of Scholl's life, from 1907 to 1916 alongside his other works of art. Most of the names of Scholl’s works were given by scholars at a later date, not himself. While living, Scholl displayed his works at his own house, and invited the surrounding community to view his works. Here he would explain individual meanings to curious visitors, though none of these meanings were specifically written down or documented by any labels. Following his death, his sculptures were displayed at his wake, and his family continued to run the at home exhibitions for a handful of years before stopping.

== Description ==
John Scholl’s Crested Swans stands at a vertical height of 84 ¼ inches, about 7 feet tall. The sculpture is split up into three main sections, the lower section, the middle section, and the upper section. The bottom is the largest of these areas and takes up just under half of the sculpture’s vertical height. From there on, the middle and upper sections are equivalent in height, and compose the rest of the sculpture. The swans of Scholl’s work are placed at about ¾ of the sculpture’s vertical height, at about 5 ¼ feet. Many of Scholl’s shapes such as four-point starbursts, arrowheads, and anchors, are two-dimensional shapes that are extended about an inch back to give them a three-dimensional presence. Unlike the spheres in his work that have a constant dimension from any angle, the starbursts, for example, only appear as a rectangle or line when viewed from the side. By viewing the statue from its front, one may see the profiles of two swans.

While the upper section of Crested Swans is almost exclusively two-dimensional, except for a gold sphere, a blue sphere, and a bluebird, the lower section has a distinctly three-dimensional aspect. Unlike the other components, the lower section has symmetry from any of the four sides, due to its arrangement of spheres and four arches that support the sculpture and act as its legs.

== Inspirations/artistic themes ==
Much like his other works of art, Crested Swans features designs popular in German folk art, specifically Pennsylvania German folk art, Fraktur. Scholl's works take heavy inspiration from Fraktur, despite the fact that he was not explicitly a member of this movement. Unlike other artists of the genre, Scholl was not so rigid with his works and inspirations. Although he clearly references the heavy symmetry and animal motifs present in Fraktur, he does not fall under the category despite his heritage.

Motifs such as doves, stars, and tulips that are popular in Fraktur decorate much of Scholl’s works. These symbols appear specifically in the many chests popular in early Pennsylvania German folk art. Understanding folk art requires knowledge of ways in which culture shapes traditions. As a result of his time spent in Germany as a child, Scholl’s woodworkings take heavy inspiration from German folk art, including motifs, symbols, and parts present in toys and housing. One notable symbol in Crested Swans is the dove, a common representation of peace, which sits on top of the sculpture but has since lost its wings. Due to the predominantly Christian beliefs within the Pennsylvania-German subculture, doves in Fraktur may be viewed as a symbol of a follower of God within the artistic setting. Another symbol popular in German folk art are the sunbursts that appear throughout the piece. Suns, and shapes similar to the sun including spirals, and starbursts are representative of the cycle of life in German folk art.

Aside from the German influences, Scholl's sculptures are further reminiscent of the art of the 19th-century Victorian era, specifically lamps and house decor. The most notable of these inspirations are the “Gingerbread" trims that Scholl picked up in his line of work as a carpenter. These designs appear originally on the home that Scholl built and later on his sculptures such as Crested Swans.

== Construction and maintenance ==
Unlike many wood carvers at the time, Scholl constructed his sculptures by carving several parts and assembling them with glue, nails, screws, and other such materials, due to his lack of traditional knowledge on the subject. This is a result of Scholl’s previous experience in woodcarving. Prior to his life as a sculptor and whittler, Scholl learned how to carve in his line of work as a carpenter, and specifically by constructing and decorating houses with trims. While his methods of construction differed from the norm, his background in carpentry aided in the formidable and longstanding nature of his structures. John Scholl used patterns and templates in order to replicate and duplicate certain sculptural elements across structures. No templates nor sketches belonging to Scholl survive, but one can view the pencil marks that guided his construction process in his sculptures on spots where the outer coat of paint has worn away.

Two stars sit below the swans atop the blue hemisphere starbursts, but they sit on the back of the sculpture in this specific placement. Unlike many of Scholl's works, Crested Swans was not included in the series of touch-ups performed by Scholl’s grandson in the 1930s since Scholl's original decoration.

Crested Swans currently resides in the Rochester Memorial Art Gallery's exhibit on American Decorative Art.
