= Life Mask and Hands of Abraham Lincoln =

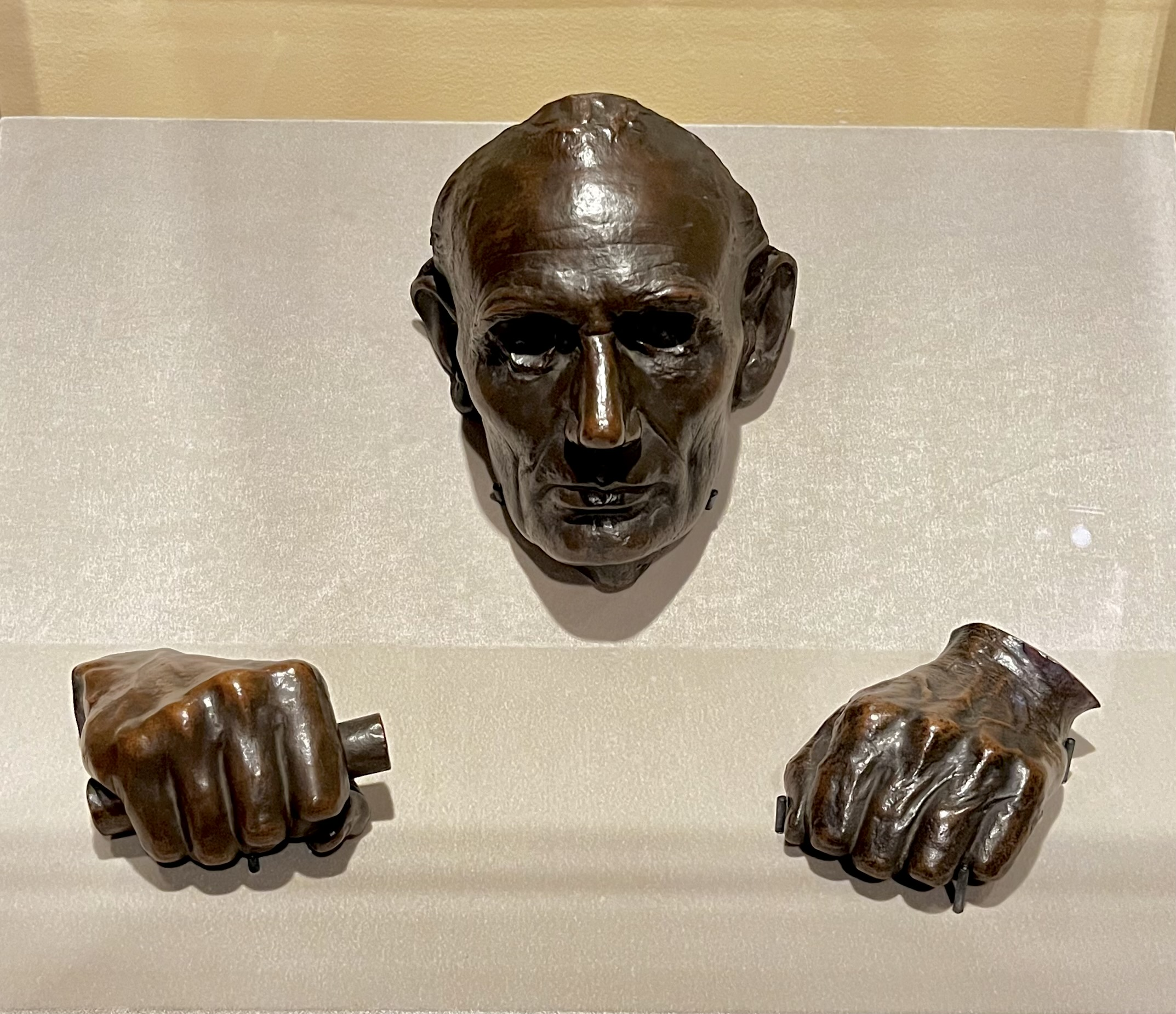
- Artists: replica by Augustus Saint-Gaudens, original casting by Leonard Wells Volk
- Year: 1886
- Medium: bronze
- Dimensions: 9 3/4 x 8 1/8 x 5 5/8 in. (24.8 x 20.6 x 14.3 cm)
- Location: Memorial Art Gallery, University of Rochester, Rochester, NY
- Accession: 1998.37.1-2a-b

Life Mask and Hands of Abraham Lincoln is a sculptural casting that was created in 1860 by Leonard Wells Volk (1828-1895) in plaster. This bronze casting replica is part of the Memorial Art Gallery's (MAG) permanent collection in Rochester, New York, and was created in 1886.

The casting is of the 16th President of the United States of America, Abraham Lincoln. The three bronze pieces represent Lincoln's face and both of his hands.

== Piece Description ==
=== Lincoln's Features ===
The casting that is Lincoln’s head is positioned on a slanted platform, so that he appears to be looking straight forward. His hands sit in fists below his head, and his right hand is holding part of a broomstick, which Lincoln cut off right before the casting. All the features of his face accurately display Lincoln’s features at the time, besides his eyes, as they appear to be two holes where the eyeball would typically be protruding. Due to the casting process of applying plaster to the face and letting it sit there until it is completely dry, Lincoln had to keep his eyes closed to prevent damage to them.

The cast captures his hairline, ears, and past his chin to the top of his neck. The asymmetry of Lincoln’s face is apparent when it comes to his ears and his eyes. His left ear appears larger, as it sticks out away from his face, while his right ear is tucked and flat to his head. His right eye sits slightly higher, due to his having been kicked by a horse during childhood. Lincoln's nose also has a very slight tilt, as its tip is pushed to the left from where it begins between his eyes. Due to Lincoln's prominent cheek bones, it made it difficult to remove the cast, and Lincoln had to pry it off himself, taking some facial hair with the plaster. Following the completion of the cast, when Lincoln saw his face looking back at him, he called it "the animal himself."

Regarding Lincoln's hands, notable is the extreme asymmetry between the right and left fists. Lincoln's right hand appears to be much larger, smoother, and swollen, due to the excessive handshaking after his presidential nomination. The left is smaller, thinner, and overall more detailed, with the creases and joints of his fingers. As the right hand holds the broomstick, its angled and raised position provides a better view of the sides of it as well as the top, while the left hand lies flat to the display surface.

=== Color and Light ===
The bronze of the casting has aged into a deep brown color on all three of its pieces. Only raised portions of the sculpture have a lighter brown color. The light shining down on the display highlights the high points of Lincoln's face, which are his nose, the top of his forehead, and the top of his cheeks. The texture of his skin is visible as the light makes his wrinkles more visible as shadows form in the crevices. Shadows also show the prominence of his cheek bones, as the lower portion of his face around his jawline and mouth are a much darker in color. Regarding Lincoln's hands, the left has a darker brown color, especially in the deep valleys between his fingers, while the right is smoother and lighter brown overall. The light pointed down on this piece helps emphasize the difference between the two hands as the highlights of each fist differ in appearance.

== History ==
=== Leonard Wells Volk: Original Casting ===
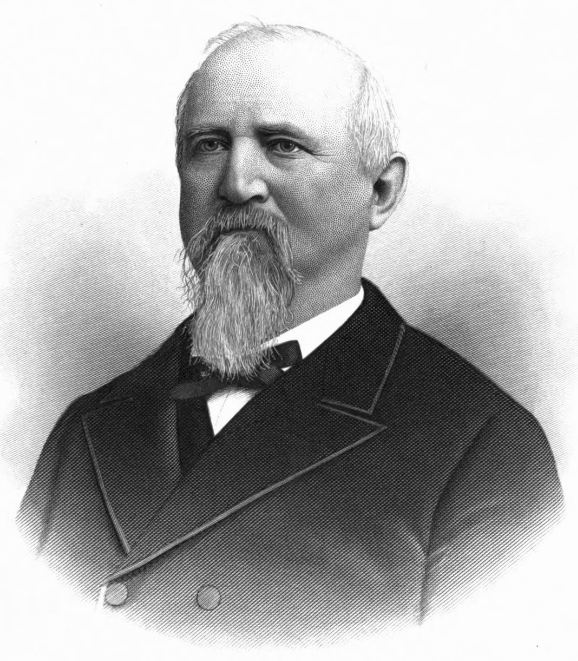
Portrait of Leonard Wells Volk (1828–1895) from History of Chicago, Illinois, Volume II, 1895, pages 120–121

In winter of 1860, in Chicago, Illinois, Leonard Wells Volk met with Abraham Lincoln in order to begin creating a bust of the presidential candidate. Volk and Lincoln spent a week meeting as Volk started molding his head and face first, then in May 1860, in the few days after Lincoln had received his nomination to run for President of the United States, Volk traveled to Springfield, Illinois and cast his hands.

Volk created two more replicas following the "artist's copy", and they were given to his son, Douglas Volk. He then gave one replica to Jean-Leon Gerome, and the other to his friend, and classmate, Wyatt Eaton. This plaster replica given to Eaton is believed to be the one that Augustus Saint-Gaudens used to create the bronze piece that the MAG has today.

=== Augustus Saint-Gaudens Replicas ===
Lincoln was elected president in 1860 and 1864, and he was assassinated by John Wilkes Booth in 1865. Volk's original casting had fallen from the spotlight and public interest, but in the years following Lincoln's assassination, his historic presence grew. Augustus Saint-Gaudens recognized the public interest in Lincoln's martyrdom and decided to buy the plaster replica from Wyatt Eaton and create multiple bronze replicas of Volk's original casting in 1886. In total, 33 individuals and institutions paid to have replicas of Lincoln's face and hands made, and each supporter had a replica made in exchange for a contribution.

The original Volk casting was not only replicated, but many artists have used the replicas for their own sculptures to maintain the accuracy that plaster casting achieves. Saint-Gaudens used the cast for his monument, Standing Man. Painters also used Volk's casting to capture Lincoln's detailed facial features in their work as well.

The original "artist's copy" is located in the Smithsonian National Museum of American History as a gift of the 33 supporters of the project to create the replicas of the piece. Saint-Gaudens hoped to save the original casting from further replication so that it would not be damaged. Only the bronze could be replicated from then on.
