= Seer Bonnet =

Series of sculptures by Angela Ellsworth

Seer Bonnet XVI (Sarah Ann)
- Part of a series
- Artist: Angela Ellsworth
- Year: 2010-11
- Medium: Sculpture (16,194 pearl corsage pins, steel, and fabric)
- Dimensions: 73.7 cm × 31.8 cm × 34.3 cm (29.0 in × 12.5 in × 13.5 in)
- Location: Memorial Art Gallery, Rochester, NY

Seer Bonnets is a series of sculptures created by the American artist Angela Ellsworth. The series began in 2008 and continues into the present. The base of each piece is a pioneer-style bonnet that Ellsworth then covers in thousands, sometimes tens of thousands, of pearl corsage pins. The pearls sit on the outsides of the bonnets while the insides are crowded with the sharp ends of the pins. Each bonnet has an individual design and size, but they are all standardized in the general construction and materials used. The design includes a large brim, bonnet crown, and long ribbon-like pieces that would have been used to fasten the headpiece. Though these pieces were modeled after traditional sunbonnets, the color pallets differ. The corsage pins Ellsworth used are light and pearly, while historical pioneer women’s sunbonnets would have been made from earthier tones in order to mask wear over time.

== Background and history ==
Ellsworth was raised Mormon and is a descendant of Lorenzo Snow who was a leader of the Latter Day Saints and former president of the LDS Church. This series aims to address issues such as gender and polygamy in the context of Mormon history. The bonnets allude to the many wives of the Mormon prophet Joseph Smith. Historians disagree on how many wives he had, but current estimates range up to 49. Like Joseph Smith, Lorenzo Snow participated in polygamy. Ellsworth’s initial series consisted of nine bonnets to reflect Snow's nine wives. The project grew and Ellsworth incorporated Joseph Smith’s wives into the series.

Each bonnet in the series has an individual title. The early pieces created in 2008-2010 are each titled Seer Bonnet followed by a Roman numeral. These numerals correspond to the nine wives of Lorenzo Snow. The titles of each piece within the expanded series is Seer Bonnet, a Roman numeral, and a name in parentheses. The Roman numeral correlates with the chronological order of marriages to the LDS leaders. The names that are in parentheses are of the women. Each piece corresponds to a wife and her number within the marriage. An example of a title is “Seer Bonnet XVI (Sarah Ann)”. Sarah Ann was married to Joseph Smith in July of 1842 when she was 17 years old. She is believed to have been the 16th wife of Joseph Smith although the orders and lists of wives are not consistent. Some of the pieces display the ages of the women within their descriptions.

On the exterior of the bonnets, there are simple designs created with pins such as circles and lines. The Church of the Latter Day Saints refers to the "seer stone" as a prophetic tool used by Joseph Smith to receive messages and foresight from God. Ellsworth’s circular designs along with the title of her series link the bonnets to the seer stones. Historically in the Mormon faith, seer stones were used by men to receive revelations. Ellsworth gives the bonnets seer symbols of stones, connecting these tools of visions to the women. Ellsworth highlights the polygamous history of LDS and the roles of the wives while removing them from the control of the men. Ellsworth constructed the traditionally soft and malleable object of bonnets into sharp and durable sculptures, in turn recontextualizing the Mormon wives in the same way.

== Related work ==
This series is part of a larger artistic endeavour by Ellsworth titled The Plural Wife Project, which has been ongoing since 2008. The thesis of this project is to explore the dynamics of polygamy created within the early Mormon church while also exploring modern queer dynamics of the family and relationships. Ellsworth's Mormon heritage and identity as a queer woman are used in tandem in her work. Ellsworth uses her connection to the sister-wives of Mormonism to bring these women of the past into the present and reimagine them with power over their history. Within The Plural Wife Project are the Seer Bonnet series, Soundproof performance, and the Sister-Wives performances.

Soundproof was a solo performance piece based on Ellsworth’s observations of the soundproof architecture found at the Manhattan temple of the Church of Jesus Christ of Latter-day Saints. This performance was awarded an Art Matters Foundation Grant, an organization that assists artists who push social and aesthetic boundaries.

Sister-Wives is a collection of performances from 2009 to 2014 that all focus on those unseen within the history of the Mormon church, the sister-wives. Like Ellsworth's other work, the idea of non-heteronomitivity is interweaved into the performances that are composed of dancing, photography, videography, costumes, props, music, and interpretive choreography.

Ellsworth’s heritage and identity are exhibited throughout her works, including the installation from 2011 Lady-Ties For a Line Dance. The objects that make up this series are the braids used for the Sister-Wives performances. Like Seer Bonnet, the braids represent the many wives by removing them from the people.
