= Tom Cafferty =

1924 oil painting by Robert Henri

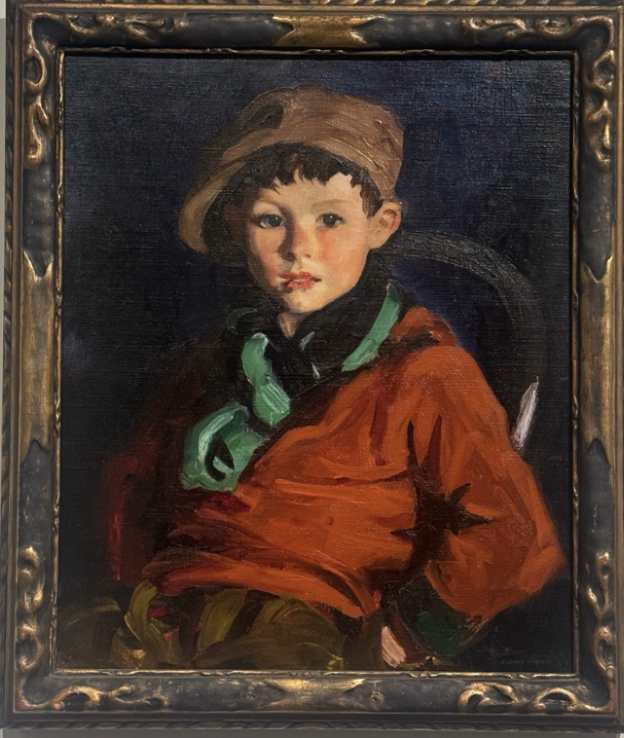
- Tom Cafferty (1924)
- Artist: Robert Henri
- Year: 1924
- Medium: Oil on canvas
- Dimensions: 22 1/4 x 20 1/8 in. (56.5 x 51.1 cm)
- Location: Memorial Art Gallery, University of Rochester, Rochester, NY
- Accession: 1926.1

Tom Cafferty is a 1924 oil on canvas painting sized 22 1/4 in × 20 1/8 in (57 cm × 51 cm) by Robert Henri (1865-1929), an American realist painter. It is part of the Memorial Art Gallery permanent collection at the University of Rochester, New York.

== Background ==
=== The artist ===
Robert Henri (1865–1929) was born "Robert Henry Cozad" on June 24, 1865, in Ohio. He came from a family of French Huguenot descent. His ancestors emigrated from Normandy, France to the Netherlands before finally settling in the United States. He was one of the major figures belonging to the Ashcan School which practiced journalistic realism. This movement can be characterized by a rejection of the Genteel Tradition and City Beautiful Movement in favor of capturing the gritty reality of city life in face of immigration and income inequality.

Henri viewed portraiture as a way to capture the true emotional and psychological character of a subject, as opposed to just physical likeness. He believed an artist should dig beneath the surface of purely physical attributes in order to capture the soul that constitutes individuality. He further believed that artistic creation is an act of self-discovery, which he insisted can only yield genuine expression when artists uncover their own unique identities and learn to trust this individuality as a source of inspiration. To him, art is a process of personal liberation and social affirmation of human dignity.

=== Historical context ===
Henri was in New York during a period when Irish immigrants were portrayed as were often described as poor, dirty, alcoholic, and prone to crime. This "negative Irish image" became entrenched in American culture through depictions in comics, newspapers, books, and law.

Crude, violent illustrations laden with stereotypes gave many readers unfamiliar with the Irish an imagined reality. The communication mechanisms, like comics, helped to reinforce the racial stereotype. Through satire and humor, they often portray the Irish as being stupid, violent, and vulgar.

In addition to print media, the same stereotypical visual language has also been extended into the arts and has become a mainstream idea worldwide. During the nineteenth century, artists like Erskine Nicol influenced how people viewed the Irish. According to Anne Dochy, Nicol's drawings for Tales of Irish Life reveals a sympathetic yet idealized depiction of rural communities. These works focused more on the idea of Irishness than on the individual’s experience. Nicol’s art romanticized the Irish peasantry and turned it into a sentimental symbol of national identity.

== The painting ==
Tom Cafferty (1924) is an oil painting on canvas painted by Robert Henri during Henri’s second time on Achill Island, Ireland. Robert Henri (1865-1929) was an American portrait artist and a leader of the Ashcan School. While on Achill Island, he formed close relationships with the local children and was inspired by this experience. Tom Cafferty was one of his Irish children portraits, which reflects the central artistic concept Henri adopted in his later years. He believed portraiture should capture the subject's real emotions and psychological state, rather than just reproduce their physical appearance. He regarded art as a process of self-exploration.

The painting was first exhibited by the Memorial Art Gallery of Rochester, New York in 1926. Tom Cafferty was purchased by Mrs. Granger A. Hollister who then gifted it to the gallery as a part of its permanent collection. It currently sits with other paintings of the Ashcan School.

Tom Cafferty strayed from the streotypical portrayal of the Irish. Henri depicted the people of the Irish countryside as individuals, not an idealized homogenous populace. He intended to paint subjects with real freedom and autonomy. This aligned with his long-standing artistic philosophy: art shouldn't be limited by social class or nationality, but should instead aim to show the inner humanity of every person. Tom Cafferty is not an isolated case; his work emphasizes attention to and celebration of individual lives rather than collective ideals. This artistic philosophy, consistently emphasized throughout his life, reflects his greater focus on the "meaning of a living life" rather than the "means of making a living".
