= Pierrepont Edward Lacey and His Dog, Gun =

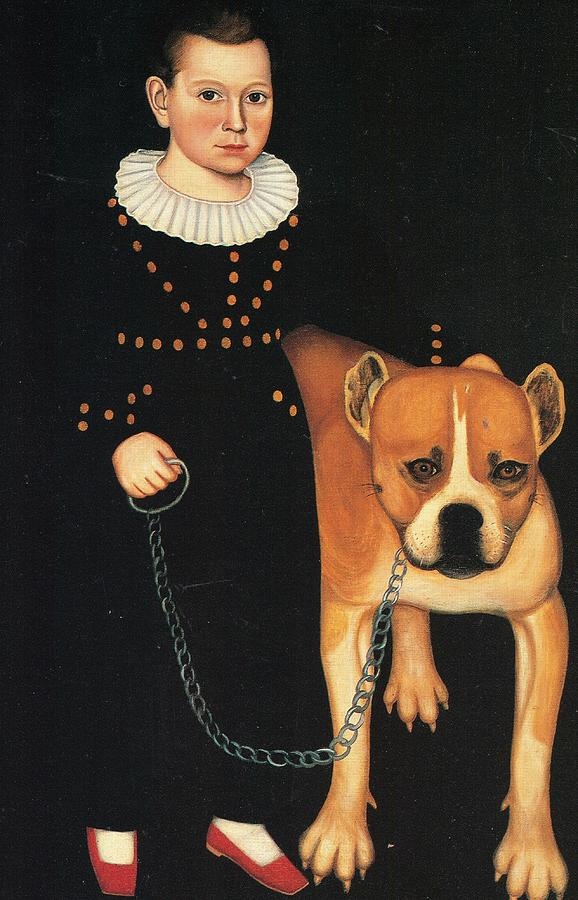
- Artist: Milton W. Hopkins
- Year: 1835-1836
- Medium: Oil on canvas
- Dimensions: 106.8 cm × 78 cm (42 in × 30 1/8 in)
- Location: Memorial Art Gallery, University of Rochester, Rochester
- Accession: 1978.189

Pierrepont Edward Lacey and His Dog, Gun, is an 1835 oil on canvas painting by Milton W. Hopkins which depicts Pierrepont Edward Lacey and his dog, named "Gun". The painting is a part of the permanent collection at the Memorial Art Gallery in Rochester, New York.

== Description ==
The portrait features a solid gray background slightly lighter than the tunic worn by Pierrepont Lacey, one of the main subjects. The black tunic is long-sleeved and runs down to his ankles, and has golden buttons adorning the wrists, waist, and chest. Pierrepont also wears a white ruff on his neck and red shoes. Pierrepont has his left hand on his dog Gun, one of the mastiffs raised by the family. His right hand is holding Gun's chain leash, as both boy and dog look out at the viewer.

Pierrepont and Gun are expressed in a style typical for folk paintings of the 19th century, using flat lighting and precise brushwork to depict subjects rather than create an expressive painting. Warm umbers, browns, and whites are used to realistically capture the typical colors of mastiff dogs.

== History ==
The portrait of Pierrepont was painted by Milton W. Hopkins along with two other portraits, Ann Gennet Pixley Lacey, his mother, and Eliza Pixley Lacey, his sister.

While the painting is now credited to artist Milton W. Hopkins, it was originally credited to artist Noah North (1809-1880). North was a student of Hopkins and painted with a style almost indistinguishable from his teacher, with the portrait of Pierrepont being identified as Hopkins' work only after his signature was discovered on a painting thought to be done by North.
