= Dawn's Landscape XL =

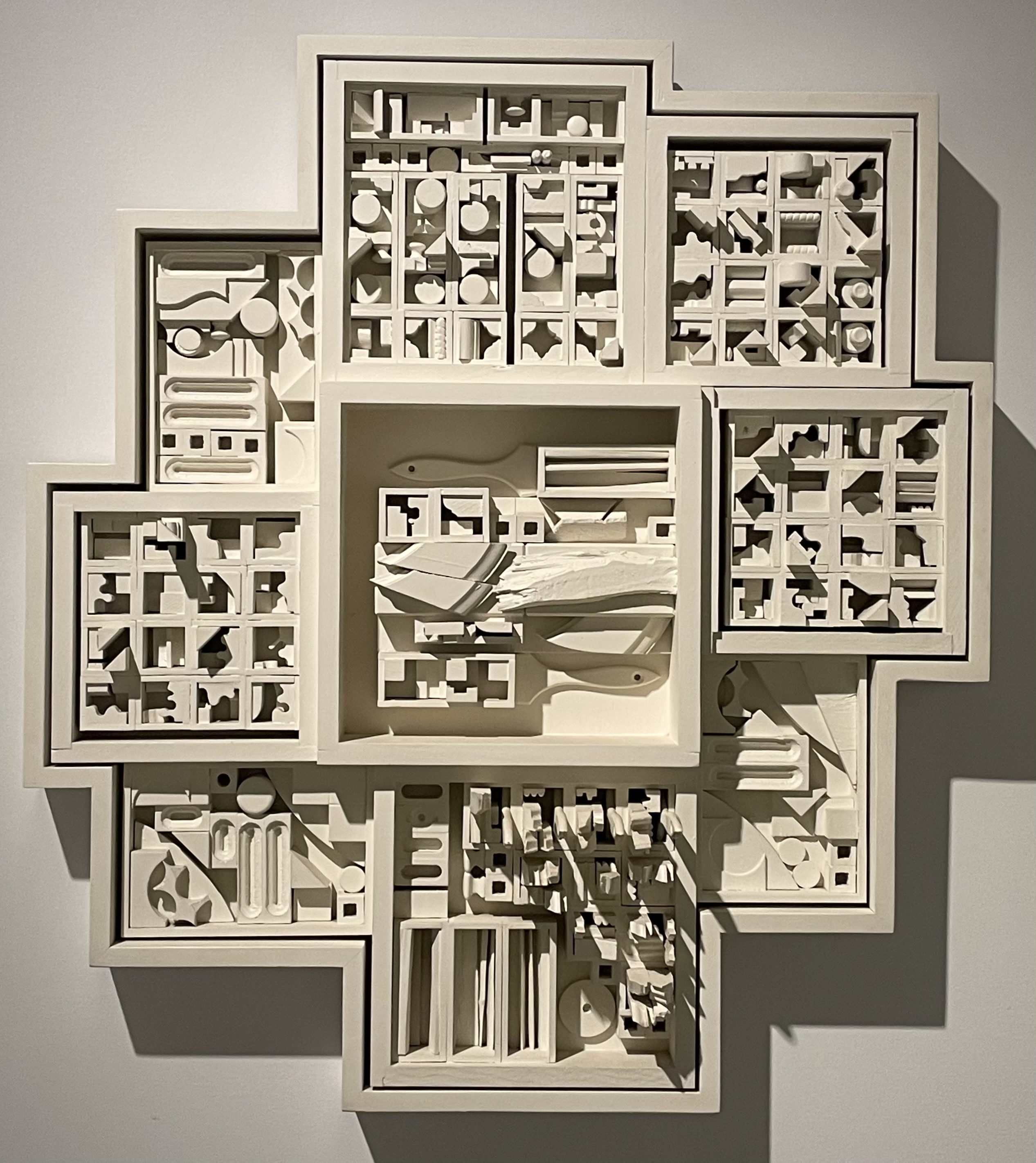
- Artist: Louise Nevelson
- Year: 1975
- Medium: Sculpture, Wood and paint
- Dimensions: 39 x 35 x 6 1/2 in. (99.1 x 88.9 x 16.5 cm)
- Location: Memorial Art Gallery, Rochester, New York
- Accession: 2005.269
- Website: magart.rochester.edu/objects-1/info/4212

Dawn's Landscape XL is a wooden sculpture created by Louise Nevelson in 1975. It currently is held by the Memorial Art Gallery in Rochester, New York.It ranks 40th in the series and Louise Nevelson completed all 44 pairs between 1975 and 1976.

== Description ==
The piece looks like an abstract drawer, where the objects and compartments become sculptural reliefs that are both organic and geometric. By removing these pieces from their original context and assembling them together, they become a unified form. The altered work consists of nine squares of varying sizes. The distribution of the modules within them appears to be random, but actually contains a deep sense of order. The sculpture is characterized by a harmonious interplay of shapes and textures, emphasizing Nyvelson's keen interest in light and shadow. The monochromatic color palette (usually black or white) allows the viewer to focus on the form of the composition and thus explore the spatial relationships within the work. Each part of the sculpture has been carefully crafted to create a sense of depth and movement that draws the eye and provokes contemplation. Literally and metaphorically, the work can be viewed as a 'landscape' - providing a sense of horizon, structure and division similar to the natural world, but presented in a distinctly abstract, man-made form.
