= Portrait of a Woman (1903) =

Dutch artist Kees van Dongen was well known during his career for portraiture, and his signature style of depicting his sitters. Many of his works featured female subjects, and this was a common theme throughout his art career. Throughout his life, his work would gather influence from his contemporaries and notable relationships.

== Formal analysis ==
Portrait of a Woman (1903) depicts a single figure on a rectangular canvas framed by a bronzy gold frame. This figure takes up a majority of the composition and exists as the focal point. The figure is seated on a visible surface, presumably a chair or type of seat like furniture. The composition is focused on the figure's upper body. Her lower body is obscured and reaches off the canvas so the viewer cannot see it. The figure's right arm appears to be resting on the aforementioned piece of seat furniture. A large triangular portion of the figure's chest is exposed, framed by a dark black shawl-like fabric that drapes and creates a generally trapezoidal shape between the figure's shoulders, arms, and her upper body.

The shapes created in the piece are triangles, diamonds, and trapezoids. The first triangle is made of the lines spanning from the top of the figure's head down to her slightly widened arms. There is another triangle, an inverted triangle that has its peak at the figures crossed knees, and goes upwards on either side, reaching her folded elbows to form the base of the second triangle. These shapes are distinct, but can be combined to form a general diamond shape when looking at the length of the figure. In the middle of this aforementioned diamond, the figure's right hand, which cradles a yellow necklace, and draws attention due to its central orientation and position.

The painting utilizes very few colors and the palette is muted. The background is a light turquoise blue color in the upper part of the piece and takes on a slightly darker blue hue further down the piece behind the figure. The figure's skin is made up of light peach skin tones for a majority of her surface area, however areas of her face, chest, and hands feature vibrant pinks, muted blues, orange, and shades of brown. The figure is clothed in a long black garment with a hat on her head that is black as well. The lower parts of the garment that are on the ends of the figure's forearms and draping from her seated lap are shades of grey that create depth and separation from the background. Yellow is featured very sparingly in the piece and is most prominent in the long gold line that spans from the figure's neck to the lap where it rests in her hand. Red, orange, and lighter pink tones are shown in the figure's right hand and short ginger hair. The chair she sits on has an outline of dark brown as well as unblended large brush strokes of grey shades to exemplify the texture difference.

Contrast is exemplified in the piece between the background and figures clothing articles. While the background is a very light, unsaturated blue color, the figure's garments are a very stark contrast against the background due to their dark coloring. Even the areas of the figure's clothing that are shaded with lighter grey hues are still distinct. Another area of contrast is with the level of blending and rendering allotted to the figure versus the background. Where the background has distinct brush strokes crosshatched and visible from a distance, the main parts of the figure are smoothed and rendered more, specifically her garments which have an almost flat tone and quality in places. There is also a notable contrast between the light shades of the blue background and the grey tones of the shadow cast by the figure and her chair.

== Biography ==
The Dutch painter Kees van Dongen was born in 1877, and lived 91 years until his death in 1968. After attending the Fine arts academy of Rotterdam, Van Dongen had his debut as a painter in 1895 at the Seidelik Museum. Dongen began his career as an illustrator and draftsman after moving to Paris in 1897. Here in the city he would become acquainted with artist Henri Matisse and become involved in the Fauvist movement. After moving to Paris, he became interested in the aesthetics of Amsterdam's Red Light District as well as Parisian night life. The characters of singers, dancers, prostitutes, and performers would become his inspiration and he would go on to have these women as sitters.

"Portrait of a Woman" (1903) is not the only work by Dongen which bears this name. Several of Dongen's later pieces share this name and depict the feminine likeness of his muses or portrait sitters, much like his 1903 work displayed currently in the Memorial Art Gallery, (Rochester, New York) as a piece in their permanent collection.

In 1905, he displayed two works in the Autumn Salon an exhibition which would be the documented emergence point of the Fauvist movement. He was a part of the Fauvism movement, alongside other artists of the era Henri Matisse and Andre Derain. The beginning of this movement, and coining of their name by Louis Vauxceilles meaning, "wild beasts," was in the 1905 Salon, where the artists exhibited a new aesthetic of painting.

Additionally in 1905, his wife Augusta (Guus) Preitinger would give birth to his first and only child Dolly. After some commercial sucsess he would also rent a studio space in the same building as Pablo Picasso, as well as other artists and writers in the Fauvist sphere. He would be exempt from fighting in both World Wars. He spent his time travelling between Paris and Rotterdam; he worked in Paris and travelled to countries such as Spain, Monaco, Egypt, and Rome with gallery exhibitions and career-boosting network connections, while his family lived in a more rural Rotterdam. This would cause Dongen and his wife Guus to be kept apart during the first World War, which would cause a severance in their relationship, leading to their separation by 1919.

The Fauvist movement that he was a part of would span from 1905 to 1910 but Dongen would eventually shift away from the movement to pursue a more lucrative career in portraiture painting for fashionable women. He eventually met Lea "Jasmy" Jacob in 1917 when he was separated from his then wife Guus, and after Dongen and Guus's separation, Jasmy and Dongen moved in together.

In 1932, Jasmy married General Alvin, and Dongen would not marry again, but he lived out the remainder of his life and career as a notorious and famous portrait artist for wealthy elites and celebrities like Bridget Bardot.
