= Jawbone and Fungus =

1931 painting by Georgia O'Keeffe

Jawbone and Fungus (recto)
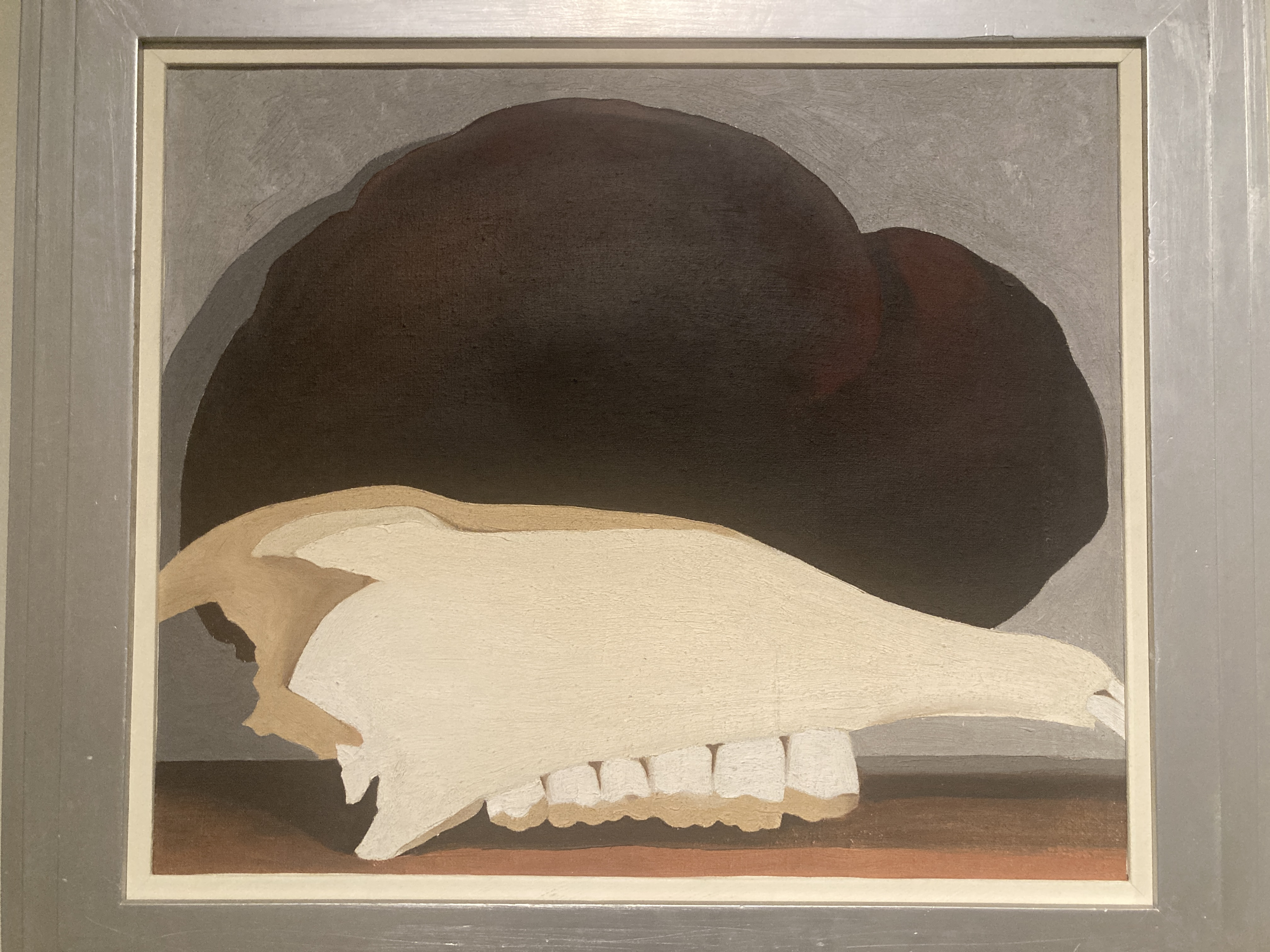
- Artist: Georgia O'Keeffe
- Year: 1931
- Medium: Oil on canvas
- Dimensions: 43.2 cm × 50.8 cm (17 in × 20 in)
- Location: Memorial Art Gallery, University of Rochester, Rochester
- Accession: 1951.11-a

Jawbone and Fungus is a 1931 oil on canvas painting by Georgia O'Keeffe that depicts the jawbone of a large animal, including the teeth, with a large fungus placed behind it. The painting is housed at the Memorial Art Gallery in Rochester, New York and is also listed in the Georgia O'Keeffe Museum's online collection.

== Description ==
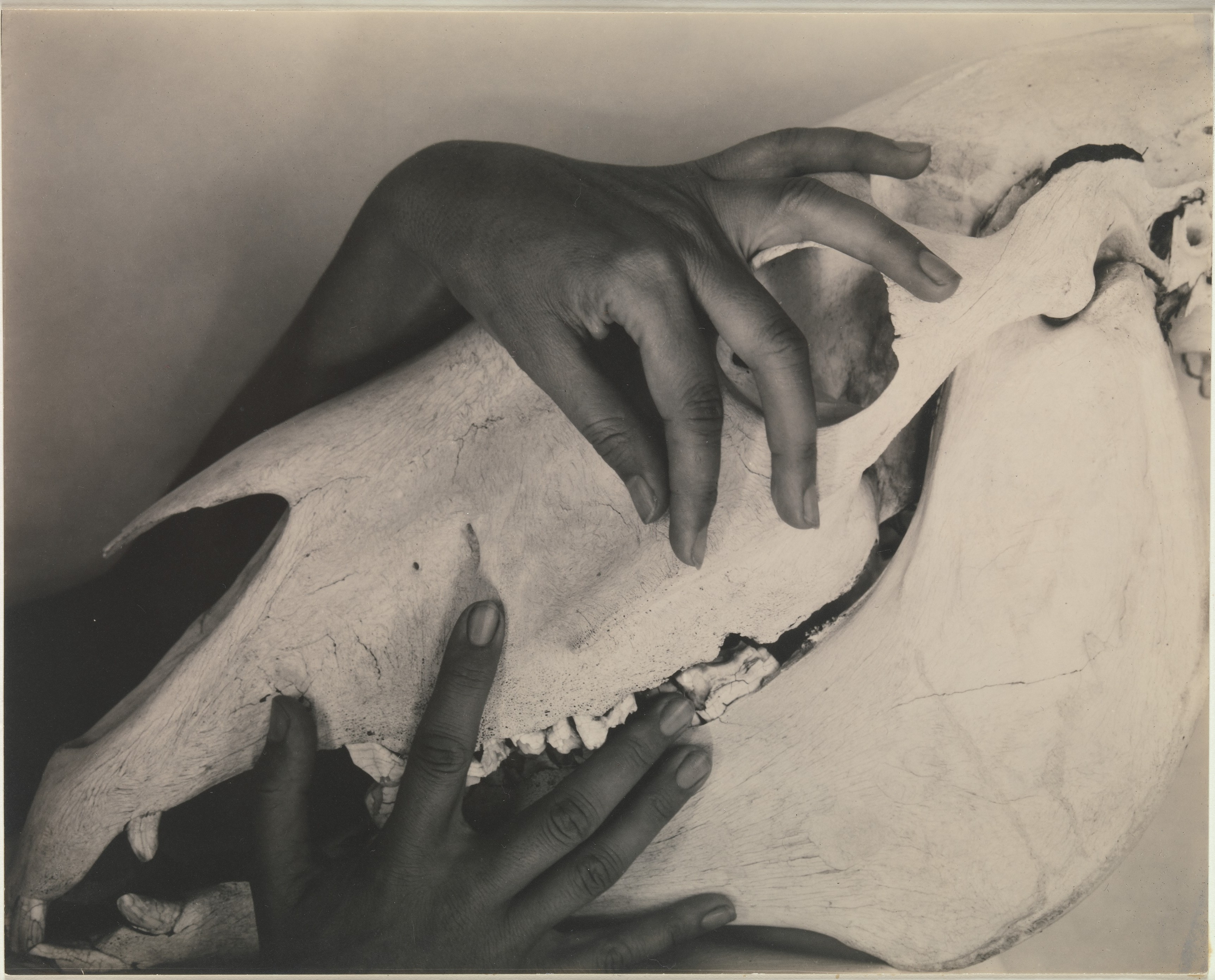
Georgia O'Keeffe—Hands and Horse Skull, Alfred Stieglitz, 1931, The Metropolitan Museum of Art, 1997.61.37

The first feature that stands out is the strong contrast between black and white. Upon closer inspection, the light grey against the black comes into focus. The reddish-brown at the base of the painting with the contrasting white matches reddish hues in the top part of the black fungus. In between the white and black images is a light tan color that borders all the colors: black, white, grey, and reddish-brown. The silver frame and white border compliment the painting's colors.

The edges of the fungus are soft and round whereas the edges of the jawbone are sharp and hard. The black fungus towers over the jawbone like a dark ominous cloud projecting a sense of doom, even death. Behind the black image is a dark grey shadow that adds another dimension, giving the painting perspective as the white jawbone is placed in front of both the black and tan images. The reddish-brown object could be a tabletop that the jawbone and fungus are placed upon.

O'Keeffe's Untitled (Abstraction) is on the reverse side of the Jawbone and Fungus and was painted around 1923. The materials are oil on canvas. The image is an explosion of color on a white canvas background. The primary colors are variations of yellow and red. There is black in the center of the image that contrasts the light, bright colors. The green and white bordering the black presents another layer of contrast. The white border begins as purple at the lefthand side of the painting and gradually becomes white as it reaches the center, continuing across the canvas, gradually turning purple again. The swath of blue with frayed edges, resembling the sharp peak of waves, draws the viewer's eyes to the top lefthand corner. Below the blue are dark red shapes that continue down the left side of the painting, some appearing heart shaped.

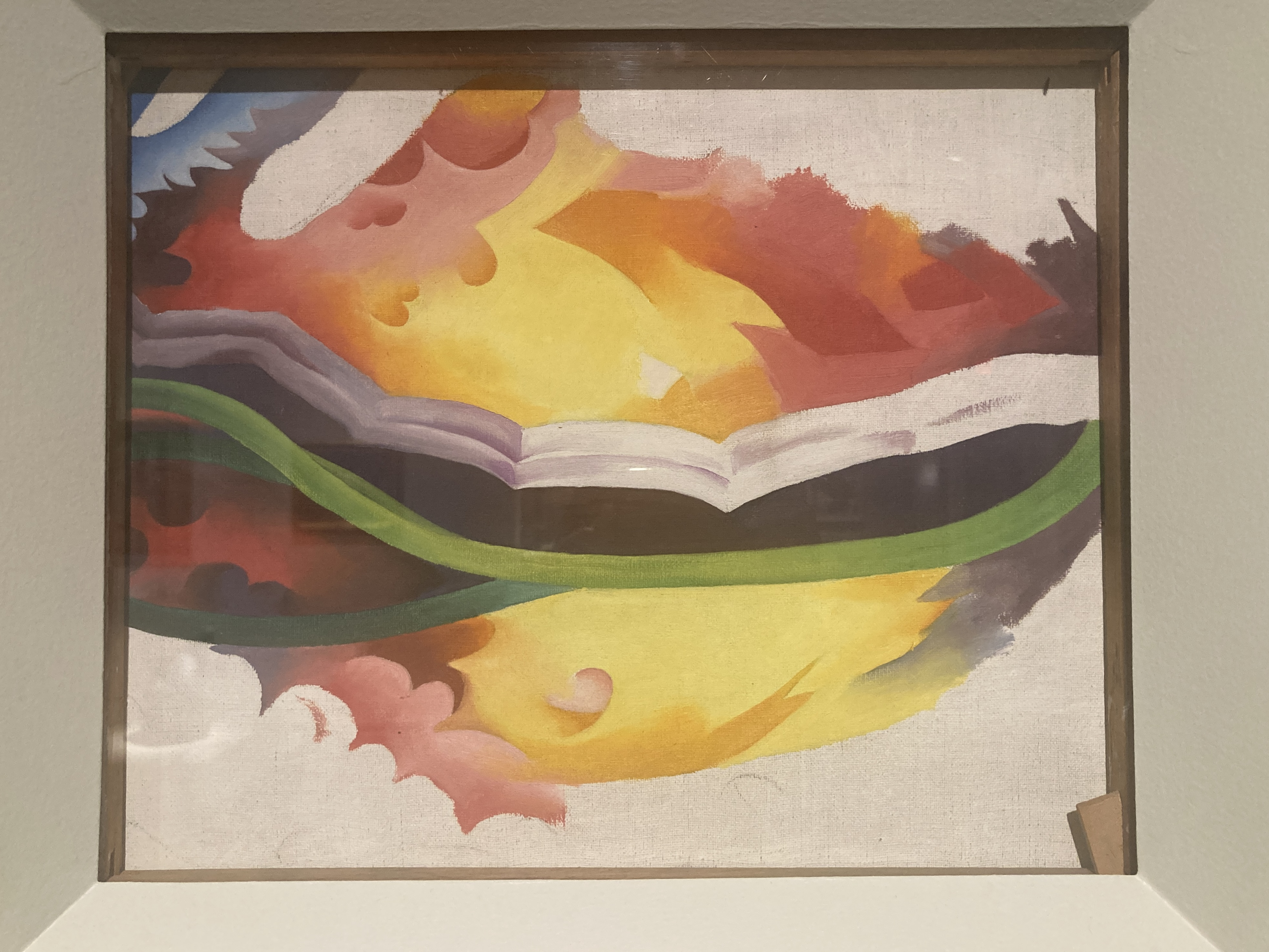
Untitled (Abstraction) (verso), 1923, oil on canvas, Memorial Art Gallery, 1951.11-b

These little "hearts", located near the bottom left of the painting are enclosed by a green border. Frayed, wave-like edges also appear at the bottom, lefthand side of the painting. The edges surrounding the rest are mostly smooth, but sometimes blotchy as if they were created with a sponge.

This painting with all of its vibrant colors could have a sense of chaos, but the black with the green and white border connects colors giving it a sense of calmness and fluidity. The image's seamless curves and lines guide the viewer's eye across the canvas, giving it a feeling of being infinite. The image does not appear to have a beginning or end.

There have been many interpretations of O'Keeffe's fascination with bones during the 1930s and '40s. She also spoke on the topic herself but never addressed this particular painting. In an essay by Sarah Whitaker Peters, it was suggested that the painting was inspired by O'Keeffe's tumultuous relationship with her husband, renowned photographer Alfred Stieglitz, who nicknamed her "white".

When describing the inspiration behind her paintings, O'Keeffe once said:

There are people who have made me see shapes-and others I thought of a great deal, even people I have loved, who make me see nothing. I have painted portraits that to me are almost photographic. I remember hesitating to show the paintings; they looked so real to me. But they have passed into the world as abstractions-no one seeing what they are.
