= Blue Prism Painting I =

2014 sculpture by Josiah McElheny

- Artist: Josiah McElheny
- Year: 2014
- Medium: Sculpture (Blue glass, mirror, oak, plywood)
- Dimensions: 107.5 cm × 107.5 cm × 18.8 cm (42.3 in × 42.3 in × 7.4 in)
- Location: Memorial Art Gallery, Rochester, NY

Blue Prism Painting I is a sculpture created by Josiah McElheny in 2014. Crafted out of blue glass, mirror, oak, and plywood, this sculpture is the first installment of his blue prism series, crafted from 2014-2015. Blue Prism Painting I features 11 blue glass shapes, set on blue mirrored shelves in a wooden box frame. It was purchased in 2014 as a part of the permanent collection for the Memorial Art Gallery in Rochester, New York.

== Background ==
Artist Josiah McElheny is known primarily for his work as a glass blower. Many of McElheny's glass objects and sculptures are noted for being replications of historical artworks, the subject matter ranging from 1950's Dior dresses to 20th-century European Modernist glass designs. McElheny includes the container as a part of each work, which typically reflects the period he's referencing by using a historical art style or material. Each of these pieces is accompanied by a caption, poem, quotation, photograph, or other written text that draws connections between the original subjects and modernity. While a product of history, these works are abstracted replica of their predecessors. McElheny's merging of the past and present is aided by his use of metal, glass, and mirrors.

== The sculpture ==
Blue Prism Painting I is a commentary on art history. The 11 glass forms are inspired by the work of 20th century designer Vickie Lindstrand. The rest of the composition uses techniques inspired by the Abstract Expressionist Ad Reinhardt. McElheny borrows Reinhardt's use of floating frames and the monochrome color palette of his "Blue Paintings". The works in this series are solid fields of blue with cross-sections that are a slightly different tones than the background. These cross-sections are only appear through long exposure to the piece, leading the viewer who does not linger to assume the painting is a simple blue canvas. Blue Prism Painting I, being composed of reflective blue glass and mirrors, only reflects blue light onto blue light. This sculpture looks flat from a distance, as if it is a painting. Like the Reinhardt's work, McElheny's piece presents as something it is not. The mirrors inside McElheny's sculptures often reflect the interior glass pieces infinitely. In this piece, the room the sculpture sits in, and the viewer, are also reflected, making each angle of observation unique. Only when one approaches the piece from up close, or at an angle, can the viewer see the interior reflections, frame, or the true materials used.
