= Breaking the Pose =

Painting by Jerome Witkin

- Breaking the Pose (The Art Class)
- Artist: Jerome Witkin
- Year: 1986
- Medium: Oil on canvas
- Dimensions: 224 cm × 180 cm (7 ft 4 in × 5 ft 11 in)
- Location: Memorial Art Gallery, Rochester, NY

Breaking the Pose – alternately titled Breaking the Pose (The Art Class) – is an oil painting from 1986 by the painter Jerome Witkin. Completed when the artist was forty-seven and working as a professor at Syracuse University, the piece has been called "a work in which figures are paired and echoed," which emphases the duality between artist and model, the occupation and the work, focus and interruption.

His paintings have developed a cult following due to his social commentary in his pieces.

== Description ==
Breaking the Pose is an oil on canvas painting which stretches 88 by 71 inches, making the human figures depicted nearly life-size. With frenetic and overlapping impasto brushwork, as well as large sections of canvas devoted to wrinkled cloth and other unidentifiable blocks of color, there is a strong appearance of disorder in the painting. Intentional, thick brushwork, such as the dark heavy line of the artist's easel and the deep, rhythmic shadowing of the backdrop contrast with the backdrops silver and the highly saturated primary colors of the models coverlet.

The three prominent figures within the painting plus the hand protruding from the lower right corner, are linearly positioned diagonally with Witkin's self portrait(s) as the in-painting artist at the lower right corner and a brunette nude toward the upper left corner; both of whom frame the dominant subject of the center of the scene.

The artist is staring at the blonde model and the disembodied hand, painted with brush strokes and is incompletely outlined in red. The blonde's right breast, ribcage and hip are accentuated with a thin stroke of highly saturated red which stands out in contrast to the bright yellow of her coverlet. On her right side the thick streak of blackish-green which runs along the contour of her waist. Both brushstroke techniques cause the woman to “pop” out of the canvas.

Witkin also uses coloring techniques to frame his intended focal point within the painting in order to keep viewers focused. The farther away the painting gets from the blonde, central figure, the more monochromatic the color becomes. In front of the central figure is a muted blue coverlet.

== Execution ==
Witkin claims to be impeded by the use of popular, inexpensive materials of the young and inexperienced artist. He finds that, instead of cotton-duck Witkin prefers linen primed with two coats of acrylic gesso. Witkin agrees that there is a reason that “artist”-grade material is more expensive. Witkin has discovered the universal media recipe he concocts before starting any painting. By mixing “six parts gum-turpentine with one part stand-oil and one-and-one-half parts Damar varnish,” Witkin ensures a long lasting matte finish. Linseed oil helps to quicken the drying process.

To add the finishing touch to his work, after the painting has had a month to dry, Witkin will go over it one last time with a mixture made of the same ingredients as he used to begin his painting. A prominent key to Witkin's process is one that every artist must discover for themselves: how to feel the paint they're working with and allow the paint to guide the artist.

Witkin is an impulsive, emotional painter. Witkin chooses to draw up preparatory sketches of his figures before applying paint to the canvas as they are how Witkin documents his artistic ideas and his journey of the investigation into his painting, but claims that too much prep drawing causes frustration. Once he begins painting he prefers using rigger brushes. With this tool he can masterfully manipulate the thickness and intensity of the brushstrokes.

Preparatory charcoal sketch for Breaking the Pose with Lisa Pannella as model.

While Witkin is spontaneous, he also has a clear, non-negotiable vision he wants to portray. Sometimes he must paint and repaint a figure multiple times in order to get the result he sees in his head. No matter how difficult the subject is to paint, the result must look effortless to the viewer.

Witkin uses photography as a technical influence in his paintings to add a sense of movement and activity. He achieves this technique by blurring forms closer to the edge of the canvas as if a shutter was trying to keep the focal point in focus.

Witkin also uses the theater to influence his work and claims each piece is a dramatic collaborative effort between painter and model. Witkin has conversations with his models to discuss how best to capture the intended human experience within each scene.

Breaking the Pose is a nearly-life-size painting that captures a snapshot moment of models posing for a painting within a studio setting. Witkin painted himself as the artist within the piece who is painting the models. Witkin used model Lisa Pannella to create Breaking the Pose’s preparatory charcoal sketches.

== Exhibition ==
Breaking the Pose by Jerome Witkin was exhibited at the Memorial Art Gallery in Rochester, NY in 1986 and has been on display in the Hawkes Gallery since the summer of 2019.
