= The Fable of Fox and Heron =

17th-century painting by Frans Snyder

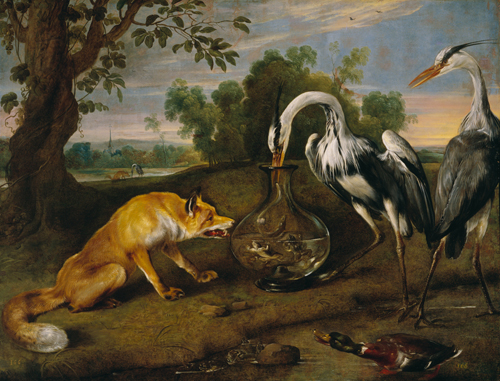
- Fable of Fox and Heron on display in 2023 at the Memorial Art Gallery
- Artist: Frans Snyders
- Year: 1657
- Medium: Oil on canvas
- Movement: Baroque
- Dimensions: 45.7 cm × 56.2 cm (18.0 in × 22.1 in)
- Location: Memorial Art Gallery, Rochester, New York

The Fable of Fox and Heron is an oil painting by Frans Snyders depicting the story from Aesop's Fable. It was created in Antwerp sometime between 1630 and 1640, the painting is a composite of two stories, "The Fable of the Fox and Heron (or stork)" and "The Frogs who asked for a King". In the painting, a fox sits on the river bank in the shade of twisting tree wrapped with vines. His spine curves with desire for the frogs in a long-necked bottle; the fox's coat of soft orange stands boldly against the dark washed brown dirt backdrop. The fox drools, open gaping pink mouth glaring at the reflective flask containing frogs and fish. One heron looks on boastfully as the other plucks a fish in its his long beak. The muted color palette of soft hues directs the viewers' eye to central scene.

== Artist and technique ==
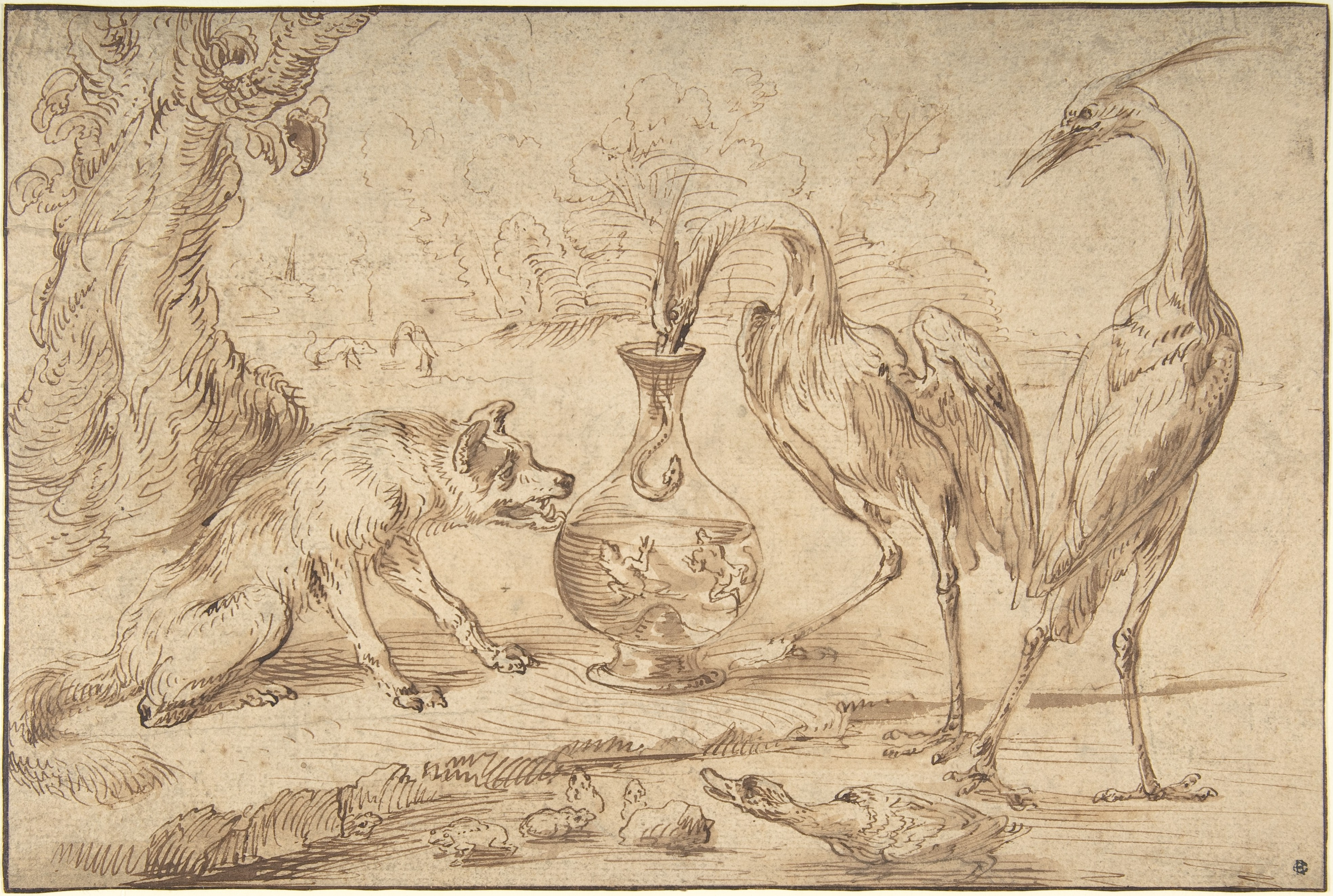
Preparatory drawing for The Fable of Fox and Herons

Father of the animal still life, Snyders studied under Pieter Brueghel the younger. He was regarded as a master animalier and particularly skilled in his depiction of dead animals and game, choosing to paint darker subject matter while still aligning with contemporary conventions. There is much debate over the potential political statements Snyders was making in these game piece. As a utopianist, his gauntly depictions of excess and unnecessary death were both complacent to and mocking of his patrons. The extreme sympathy he displayed to his dead subjects carries over in his depiction of the fox and herons. Friend of Reubens and Van Dyke, he was a frequent collaborator whose work was very influential on Dutch Realists and later Baroque artists. Herons, like the ones above, appear in nearly a quarter of all his work. The dark palette observed above was common throughout Snyder's work, notably the inclusion of the white feather coat of the Heron in striking contrast to the backdrop can be observed in multiple of his pieces (see Still Life with Dead Game).

The work is first sketched and the composition planned (see figure to the right). Linen Canvas is stretched across a wooden frame and secured with metal brackets (or staples). Then it is coated with a thin glue and primed with a transparent red pigment. The artist may then begin to apply the oil paint as desired.

== Aesop's Fables ==
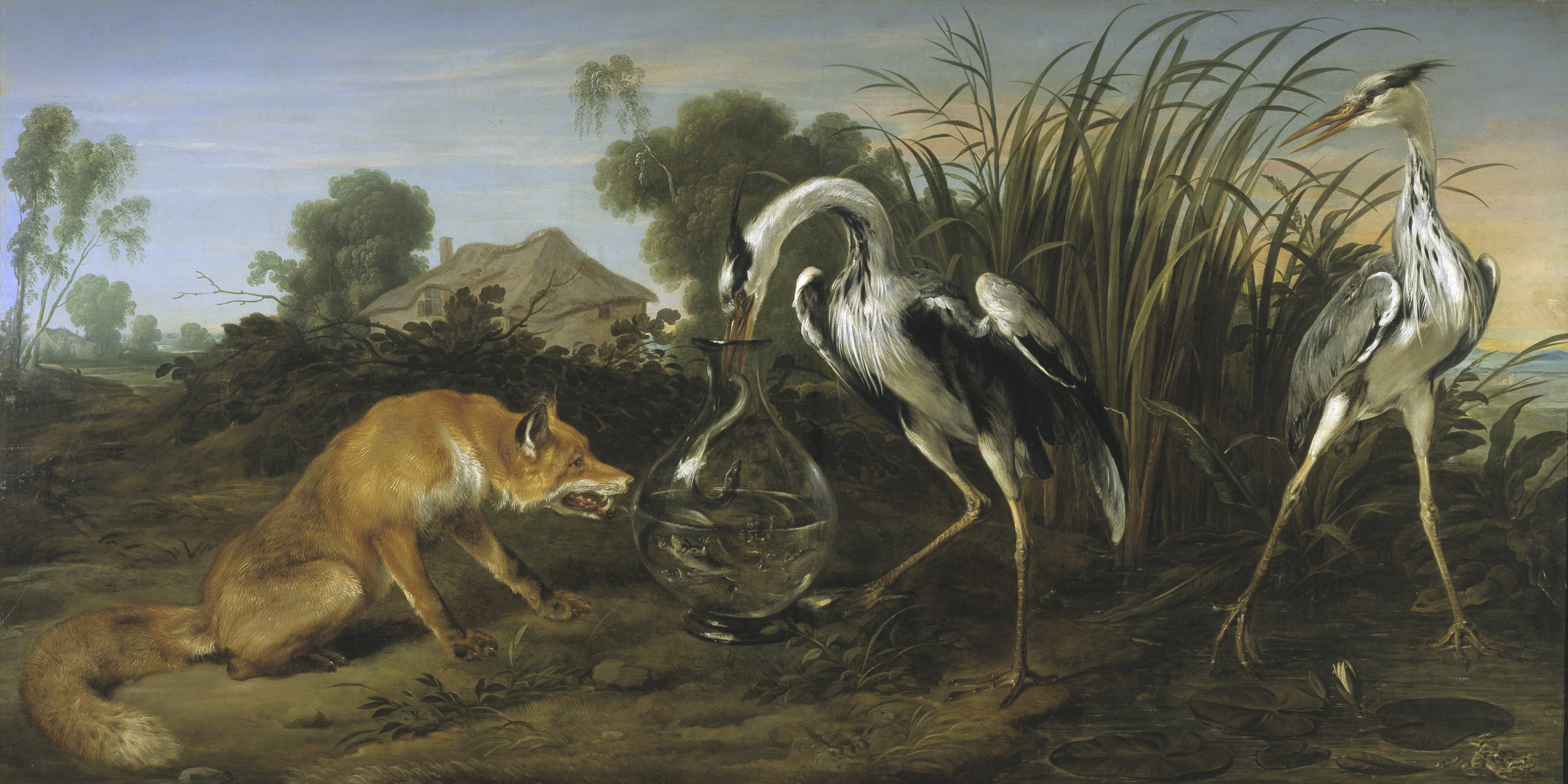
Another version of the Fable of Fox and the Heron by Frans Snyders, from the Nationalmuseum in Stockholm, Sweden

Visual or pictural adaptations of Aesop's Fables were a long-standing established tradition across Europe in the 17th century. Alongside the rise of animaliers in the Humanist movement of Antwerp was the rise of these pictorial adaptation that took on a life of their own.

=== The Fable of the Fox and Heron (or stork) ===
The Fox invites the Stork (or heron) over for mouse-tail soup which he serves in a flat bowl, inaccessible to stork's beak. So, the stork invites the sly fox over for sardine (or frog) stew which she serves in a slender necked bottle, inaccessible to the foxes stout snout.

Moral of the story: One bad turn deserves another.

=== The Frogs who asked for a King ===
The frogs, disorganized and directionless, asked the god Jupiter for a king. So the gods threw down a log into the water. This log king was amiable and supported the frogs in their lounging. The young frogs, knowing nothing but the time of the log, sat upon the log and croaked to Jupiter about theirs woes with the government. So the gods threw down a Heron king who ate the frogs in mass.

Moral of the story: Know how good you've got it.
