= Three Trees, Winter =

1922 painting by Harold Weston

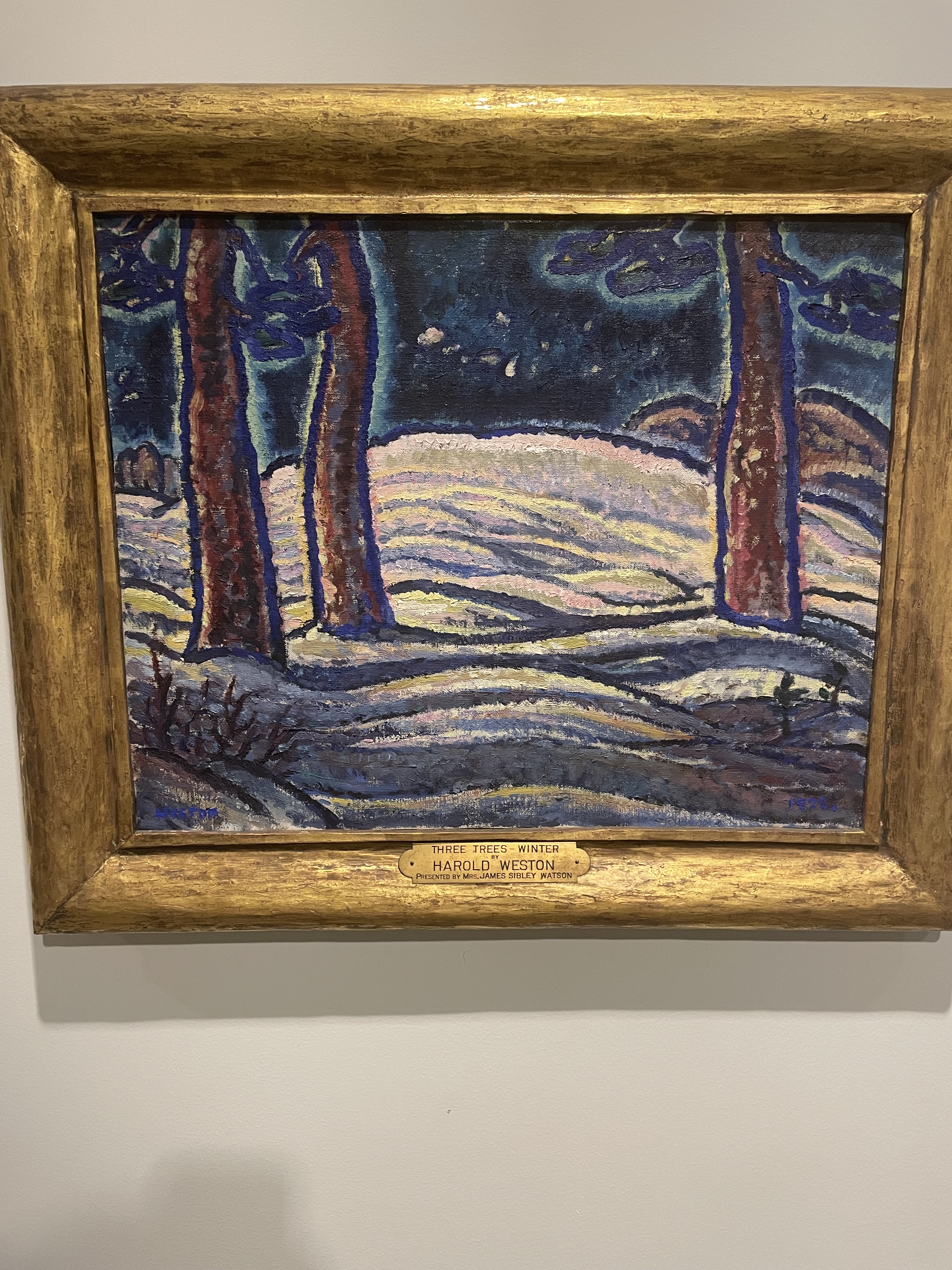
- Artist: Harold Weston
- Year: 1922
- Medium: oil painting
- Dimensions: 16 x 20 in. (40.6 x 50.8 cm)
- Location: Memorial Art Gallery, University of Rochester, Rochester, NY
- Accession: 1925.33

Three Trees, Winter is an oil painting sized 16'' x 20'' on canvas painted by Harold Weston. It is currently on display in the permanent exhibition "Seeing America" in the Memorial Art Gallery at Rochester, New York in the United States. The painting was finished in 1922 and depicts three trees in a winter landscape located in the Adirondack Mountains.

== Description ==
Harold Weston's Three Trees, Winter, depicts a scene from a winter night, with three trees in it. The piece has rolling hills of snow and a dark night sky in the background. The piece is made with oil paint on canvas, and Weston uses different colors to indicate lighting and shadow throughout the piece, such as purple, yellow, and pink.

== Technique ==
The piece is made with oil paint on canvas, and Weston uses different colors to indicate lighting and shadow throughout the piece, such as purple, yellow, and pink. Weston's piece focuses on the thick lines that separate each tree and each layer in the snow, both from the foreground to the background. The painting appears ethereal, with a glow emanating from the trees that contrasts with the dark blue of the night sky. This juxtaposition draws the viewer's gaze to the namesake of the painting: the trees. When one first sees Harold Weston's Three Trees, Winter, they will notice the composition of the piece. The composition might seem unbalanced at first to the untrained eye. However, as one looks at it longer, they will observe that while there are two trees on one side of the painting, and one on the other, the brown hills behind the tree on the right help to balance out the piece, as well as the snowy hill in the middle. Composition is nothing without pictorial space, and Weston does a brilliant job of creating this. The piece is darker in the foreground and gets lighter as it moves to the background, creating a sense of depth.

Instead of the snow being shaded grey to create the illusion of three-dimensional space, Weston uses unnatural colors to shade both the snow and the trees, making it more interesting to look at, as the viewer notices all of the different colors and shades used. He also employs chiaroscuro to make the forms of the objects more noticeable, contrasting the lighter values of the yellows with the darker values of the purples when painting the shadows. When it comes to linear perspective, the overlapping of the snow and the trees creates a sense of space, showing the viewer how the snow is piled up, and the juxtaposition of the dark trees with the lighter snow. Weston's use of form is interesting. There is no single straight line in the entire painting, promoting an organic sense without even looking at the title or subject matter. Speaking of lines, when one gazes at the lines in the painting, they will see that the contour lines are not smooth, instead having bumps in them, as if there was too much paint on Weston's brush. This contributes to the organic feel, as in nature, lines are seldom smooth. While one may compare the thick lines of Weston's piece to those made by dark black ink, there are differences. The viewer will notice that the lines aren't black, as one may assume, but instead a light blue, fitting into the cool tone of the piece and further reinforcing the idea of winter.

The colors used in this painting are otherworldly. Weston masterfully creates shadows and forms with different colors that might not fit into a typically realistic piece. In doing so, he eliminates the need for tones throughout the piece, as he uses colors of other values to express 3-dimensional space. His painting appears mystical, as those colors are not typically seen in a winter landscape, but they somehow fit, letting the viewer know that this piece is special and unique.

Further adding to the uniqueness, Weston employs an interesting technique when using his oil paints that gives the work a bumpy texture. From the contour lines to the snow and shadows, every single stroke appears to have been created using a stippling method, which means that the paintbrush creates dots repeatedly on the piece. This method of making bumps with every line and stroke captures the texture of the powdery snow and the wood. The texture is apparent in this piece and makes it striking to gaze at.

== Background ==
Harold Weston has been entranced with the Adirondacks since he was nine years old. He felt connected to the landscape and often painted the scenery of the mountain range. Eventually, he decided to move to the Adirondacks, and after he moved, he made a habit of often hiking the mountains, getting more inspiration from his art. He specifically got inspiration for his Three Trees, Winter painting when he stopped beside a Hemlock tree, and circled his arms around it, feeling more connected to the earth and mountains than ever before. By giving himself over to the wilderness of the Adirondacks and almost worshipping it, he gained inspiration to paint. The Adirondacks were his main inspiration, and he spent his life dedicated to them, writing a book about their intricacies, building a studio in the mountains and living as a recluse, and donating funds from his book, Freedom in the Wilds: An Artist in the Adirondacks, to keep the trails alive. Three Trees, Winter, was one of his first pieces. He dedicated himself to living alone in the mountains and learning how to paint in 1920, two years later, in 1922, is when he began his notable paintings, and painted Three Trees, Winter.

== Exhibitions ==
Three Trees, Winter, has been featured in numerous exhibitions. It is currently on display in the Seeing American exhibition in Rochester, NY, in the Memorial Art Gallery. Seeing America is an exhibition focused on America's change over history, and was made in collaboration with the University of Rochester, to ensure that it is not just an exhibition of American art, but a lesson on the intricacies of American culture. This piece was also in a brief display called Paintings by Harold Weston, which, as suggested by its name, contained paintings by Harold Weston. This was displayed in 1925 in the Memorial Art Gallery as well. In the past, this piece has also been in The Expressionist Landscape: North American Modernist Painting exhibition at the Birmingham Museum of Art from its creation until 1947.
