= Memorial Art Gallery =

Art museum in Rochester, NY

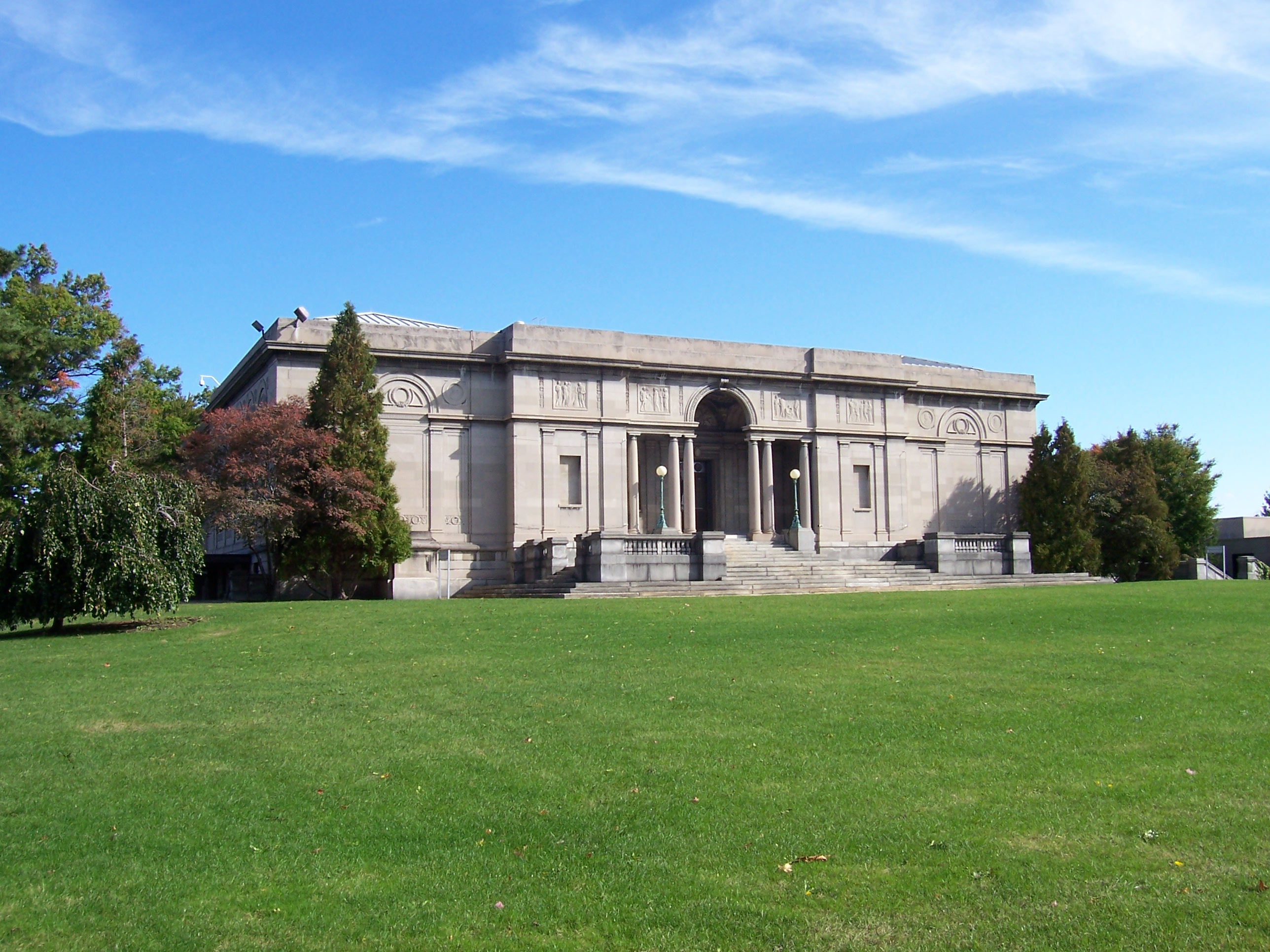
- South facade of the main gallery
- Established: 1913
- Location: 500 University Ave; Rochester, NY 14607
- Coordinates: 43.157222°N 77.588056°W
- Type: Art museum
- Collection size: 13,000
- Visitors: 238,082 (2017 - 2018)
- Founder: Emily Sibley Watson
- Director: Sarah Jesse
- Owner: University of Rochester
- Employees: 66 (2013)
- Public transit access: University & Goodman, RTS Bus: 9 University, 41 Culver/Goodman Crosstown
- Parking: On site (no charge)
- Website: mag.rochester.edu

The Memorial Art Gallery, colloquially referred to as the MAG, is a civic art museum in Rochester, New York. Founded in 1913, by Emily Sibley Watson and given in trust to the University of Rochester. Occupying the southern half of the University's former Prince Street campus. Home to a permanent collection of more that 13,000 objects. It is a focal point of fine arts activity in the region and hosts the biennial Rochester-Finger Lakes Exhibition and the annual Clothesline Festival.

== Free for All, Forever Initiative ==
For the first 56 years of the gallery's life admission was free. As part of the University of Rochester's For ever better Campaign, the Free for All, Forever Initiative seeks restore that legacy and remove barriers to access the gallery's collection.

In October 2025, Abby and University Trustee Doug Bennett joined by the Sands Family Foundation led by co-chairs Richard Sands and Robert Sands, Donated to $3 million. Establishing the "Free for All Endowment" with the goal to remove barriers to access at the gallery. The capstone goal of the endowment is permanent free admission the galley.

In March 2026, Mary Ellen Burris, a Warner School alumna, contributed an additional $2 million to the endowment. The University of Rochester claims it would need $9 million to cover the short fall in admissions revenue and additional costs of increased attendance.

In May 2026, the University of Rochester announced that the Free for all Endowment had reach its goal, after raising more than $9 million. The Gallery is expected to open its doors free of charge sometime in 2027.

== History ==
The Gallery is a memorial to James George Averell, a grandson of Hiram Sibley. After Averell died at age 26, his mother, Emily Sibley Watson, spent several years seeking a way to publicly commemorate him. Meanwhile, Rush Rhees, president of the University of Rochester, had been looking for benefactors to help him add to the University's campus, then located on Prince Street in the City of Rochester. Rhees included a dedicated art gallery on a map of the campus as early as 1905. The Rochester Art Club, which was the focal point for art enthusiasts of the area and which had exhibited and taught at art venues of the time (Reynolds Arcade, the Bevier Memorial Building, and the Powers Block) supported the creation of the gallery. Since its establishment in 1912, the Gallery has existed as a department of the University with an independent board overseeing its collections and programs. Rush Rhees assembled the initial board of managers, including the Art Club's president, George L. Herdle, in November 1912 and by the eighth of the following October, presided over the Gallery's opening.

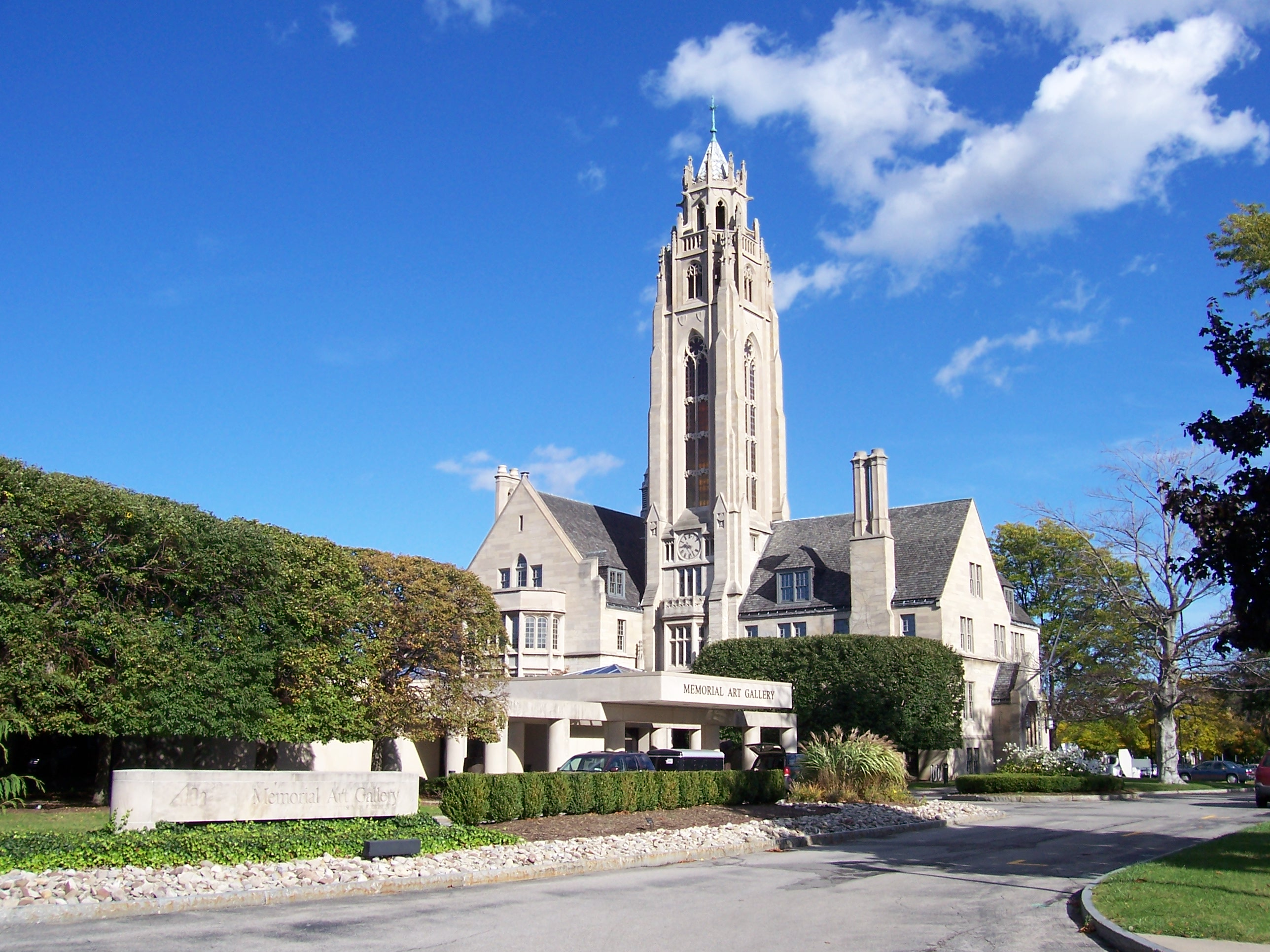
The Gallery main entrance, also showing the Cutler Union

The inaugural exhibition, curated by George Herdle, consisted of contemporary American paintings, many of which were for sale, on loan from the artists or their dealers. Since the Gallery had no endowment for acquisitions in its first decades, exhibitions were an opportunity for donors to acquire works and then immediately gift their purchases to the gallery to start its permanent collection. Significant early gifts acquired from exhibitions included: Willard Metcalf's [Golden Carnival], Joaquín Sorolla's [Oxen on the Beach] and Paul Dougherty's [Coast of Cornwall, near St. Ives].

George Herdle organized an ambitious exhibition schedule with multiple exhibitions changing monthly. Significant early exhibitions included the 1914 exhibition at which the original Kodachrome two-color process was introduced, and in 1919 a controversial solo exhibition by George Bellows. Annual exhibitions of the Rochester Art Club were also held at the Gallery. In the early years, these changing exhibitions were supplemented by summer loan exhibitions from the private collections of George Eastman, the Sibleys, the Watsons, and other prominent Rochester families. With Herdle's untimely death in 1922, his daughter and University of Rochester graduate, Gertrude L. Herdle began what would become a 40-year career as the museum's director. Another daughter, Isabel C. Herdle, served in various curatorial roles beginning in 1932 after schooling at the University of Rochester, with graduate work at Radcliffe College and Paul Sachs' museum studies course at the Fogg, the Courtauld Institute of Art, and the Royal Institute of Technology in Stockholm. Before joining her sister at the Memorial Art Gallery, Isabel Herdle worked for one year at the de Young museum.

Today, the Gallery is supported primarily by its membership, the University of Rochester, and public funds from Monroe County and the New York State Council on the Arts.

== Provenance ==
- George Eastman's collection of about 60 Old Master, British, Dutch, American, and French Barbizon School paintings, including Rembrandt's Portrait of a Young Man in an Armchair
- The Encyclopedia Britannica collection of twentieth-century American art
- The Charles Rand Penney collection
- Egyptian and Eastern Mediterranean antiquities from the collection of Herbert Ocumpaugh, a 19th-century businessman
- Near East antiquities from the collection of Frederic Grinnell Morgan of Aurora, NY
- English and Continental silver from the 17th through 19th centuries from the collection of Ernest Woodward, heir to the Jell-O fortune
- The permanent collection includes more than 500 objects from the collections of four generations of the Sibley and Watson families.

== Collection ==
The Gallery's permanent collection comprises over 13,000 works of art, including works by Monet, Cézanne, Matisse, Homer and Cassatt. Contemporary masters in the collection include Wendell Castle, Albert Paley and Helen Frankenthaler. Works include:

- Blowing Smoke Rings by Isabel Bishop, 1938.
- Blue Prism Painting I by Josiah McElheny, 2014.
- Breaking the Pose by Jerome Witkin, 1986.
- Cluster No. 13 by Ida Kohlmeyer, 1973.
- Colonel Nathaniel Rochester by John James Audubon, before 1831.
- Creation Myth by Tom Otterness, 2011-12.
- Crested Swans by John Scholl, ca. 1910.
- Dawn's Landscape XL by Louise Nevelson, 1975.
- Fragment by Nancy Graves, 1970.
- Harem Scene by Daniel Israel, 1895-1900.
- I’ve Lost My Head - Flames of Passion Leap from My Belly by Zandile Ntobela, 2021.
- Interior of a Gothic Church by Paul Vredeman de Vries, 1595.
- Interior of a Mosque by Jean-Léon Gérôme, 1890-1899. It is the only painting from Hiram Sibley's original collection still in the Gallery's possession.
- Interlude by John Koch, 1963.
- Jawbone and Fungus by Georgia O'Keeffe, 1931.
- John Ashbery by Elaine de Kooning, 1975.
- L 'abandonne by Georges Rouault, ca. 1935-1939.
- Life Mask and Hands of Abraham Lincoln by Augustus Saint-Gaudens, 1886 (original casting by Leonard Wells Volk)
- Morning on the River by Jonas Lie, 1911-12.
- On a French River by Emma Lampert Cooper, late 1800s.
- Peeling Onions by Lilly Martin Spencer, ca. 1852.
- Pierrepont Edward Lacey and His Dog, Gun by Milton W. Hopkins, 1835
- Portrait of a Young Man in an Armchair by Rembrandt Harmensz van Rijn, ca. 1660.
- Portrait of a Woman by Kees van Dongen,1903.
- Rose Garden, by Maria Oakey Dewing, 1882.
- Seer by Helen Frankenthaler, 1980.
- Seer Bonnet XVI (Sarah Ann) by Angela Ellsworth, 2010-2011.
- Statue of Venus Obliterated by Infinity Nets by Yaoyi Kusama, 1998.
- Study for "Christ Rejected" by Benjamin West, 1811.
- Tom Cafferty by Robert Henri, 1924.
- The Apparition of the Virgin to St. Hyacinth by El Greco, ca. 1605-1610. It is the first work to be acquired from the Gallery's Marion Stratton Gould endowment.
- The Clown by George Condo, 2010.
- The Entombment by Luca Giordano, 1650-1653.
- The Fable of Fox and Heron by Frans Snyders, ca. 1630-1640.
- The Garden of The Hesperides by M. Louise Stowell, 1900.
- The Rocks at Pourville, Low Tide by Claude Monet, 1882.
- The Sunset Scene by Tiffany Studios, after 1915.
- The Wanderer by George Grosz, 1943.
- The West Wind by Thomas Ridgeway Gould.
- Three Fujins by Hung Liu, 1995.
- Three Trees, Winter by Harold Weston, 1922.
- Unfinished Portrait of Nathaniel Hurd by John Singleton Copley, ca. 1765 .
- Woman Fixing Her Hair by Elizabeth Catlett.

== Community involvement ==
Besides hosting exhibitions, classes, and educational programs, the Gallery puts on such major events as the biennial Rochester-Finger Lakes Exhibition and the annual Clothesline Festival.

- The Rochester-Finger Lakes Exhibition is a biennial competition for artwork from New York's 27 westernmost counties. It is judged by guest jurors, which have included Charles E. Burchfield, John Bauer, former director of the Whitney Museum of American Art, and Thomas Messer, former director of the Solomon R. Guggenheim Museum. Past winners include Wendell Castle, Albert Paley, Honoré Sharrer, Hans Christensen, Bill Stewart, Graham Marks, and Kathy Calderwood. It grew out of the Rochester Art Club's annual members-only exhibitions which were held in the Gallery starting in 1914, and became a separate event in 1938 under its current name.
- The Clothesline Festival is an open-air exhibition where visitors buy artwork directly from New York state exhibitors and enjoy live entertainment and family activities. The Gallery reluctantly initiated the Festival as an unjuried show in 1957, and the Festival has consistently proved a crowd-pleaser as well as a means to bolster the Gallery's budget.

== Facilities ==
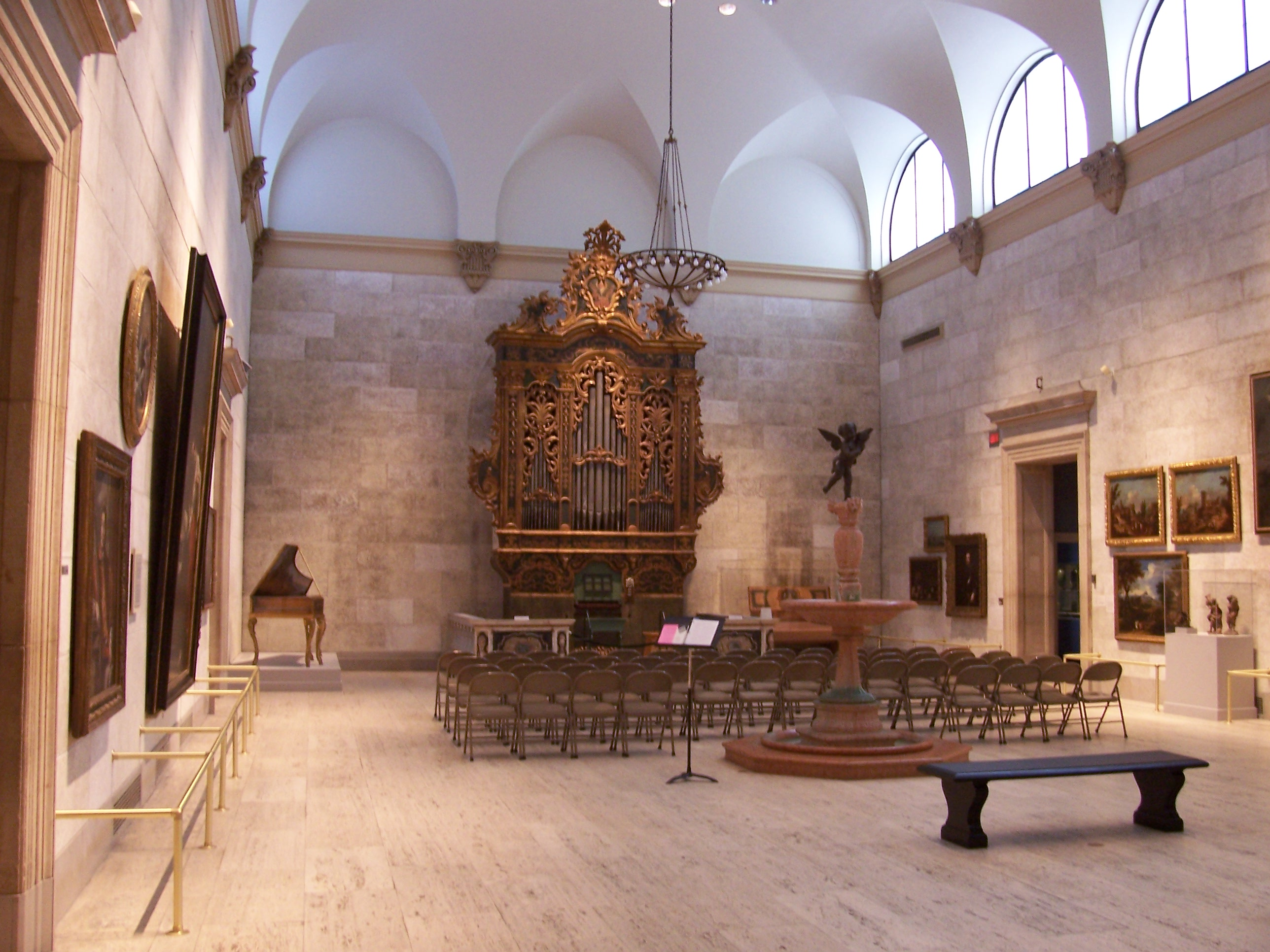
The fountain court in the main gallery

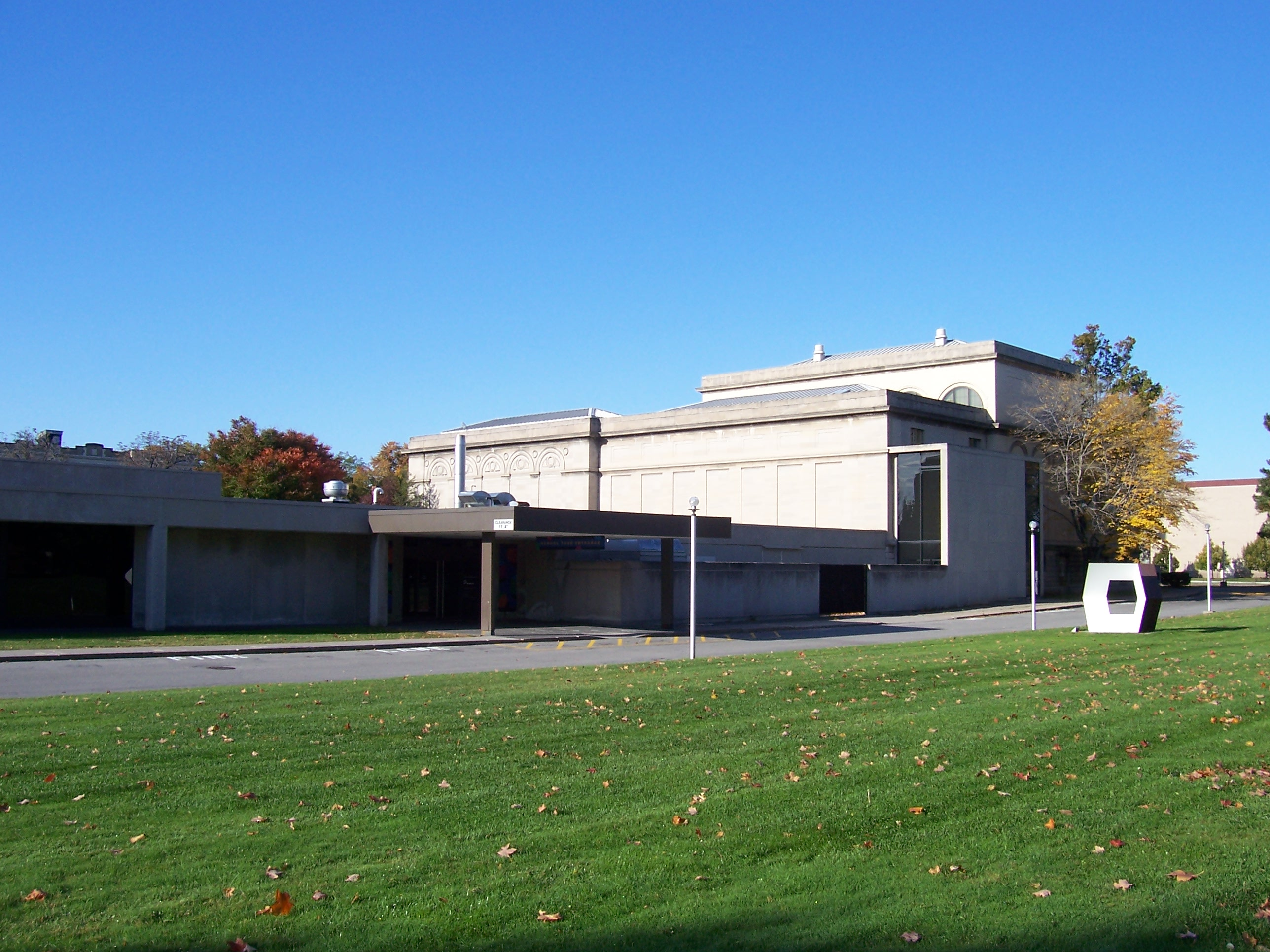
The 1968 entrance—still used as an entrance for group tours

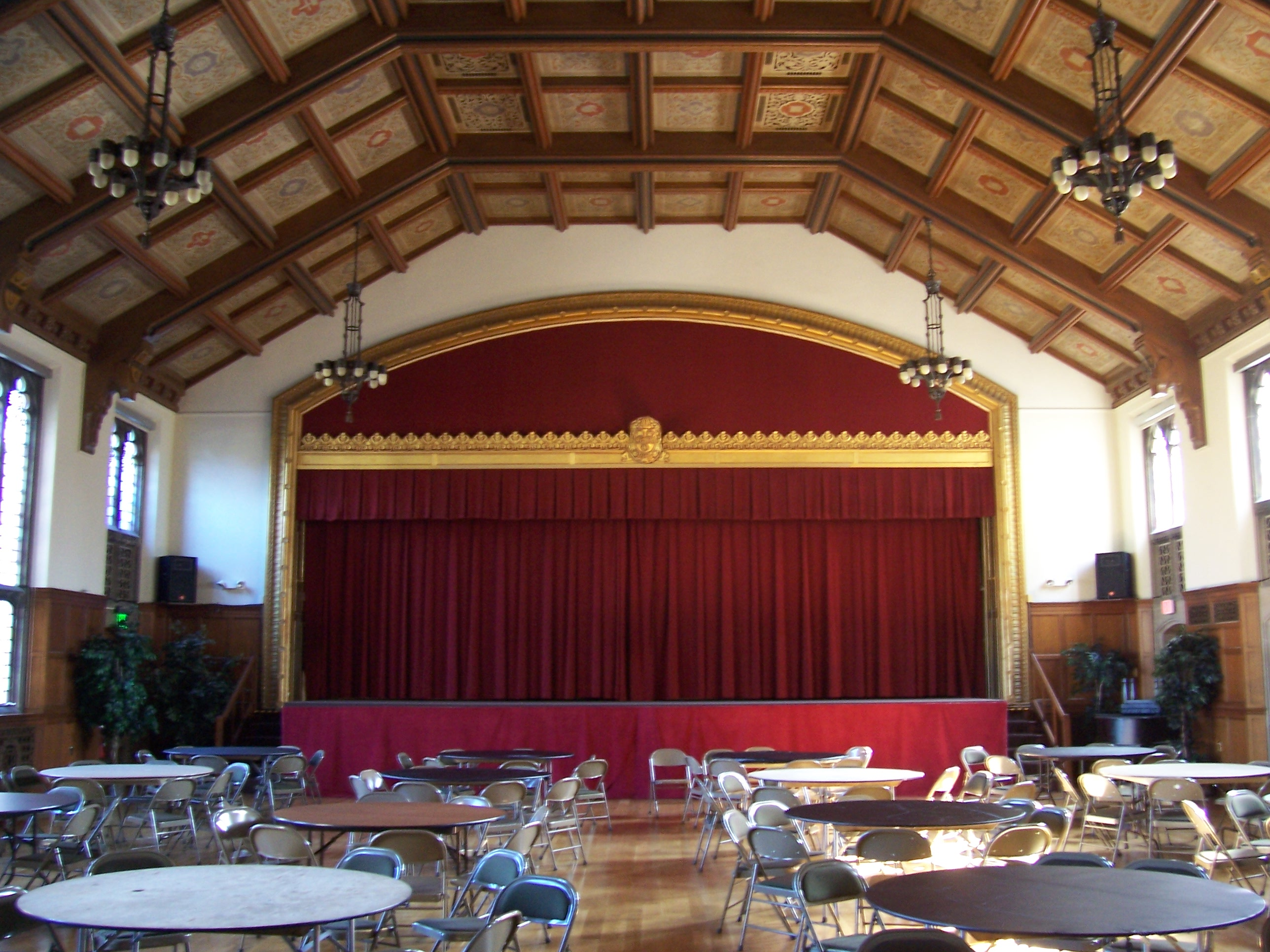
The M&T Bank ballroom

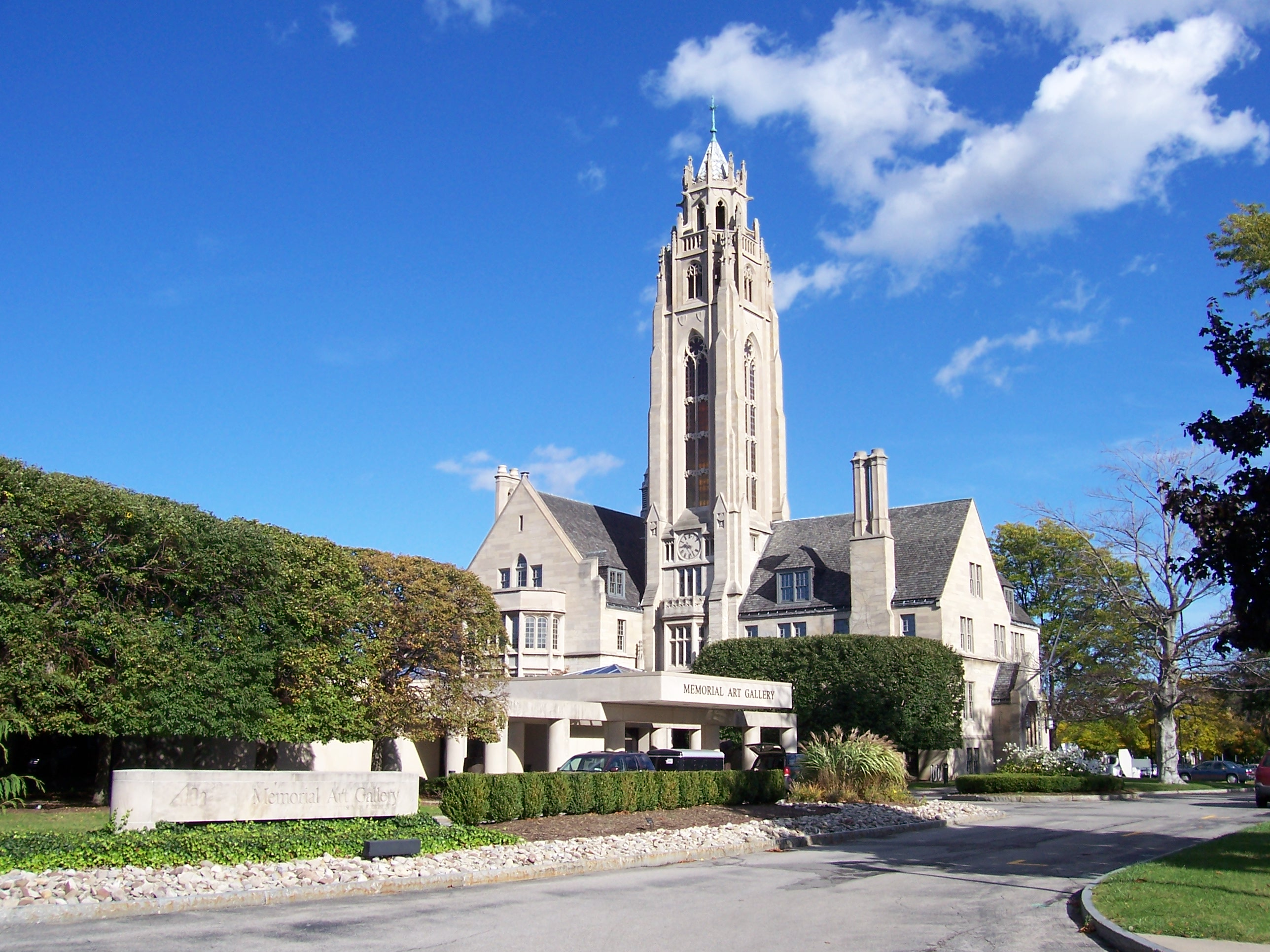
The Vanden Brul pavilion serves as a passage between the 1968 wing and the Cutler Union.

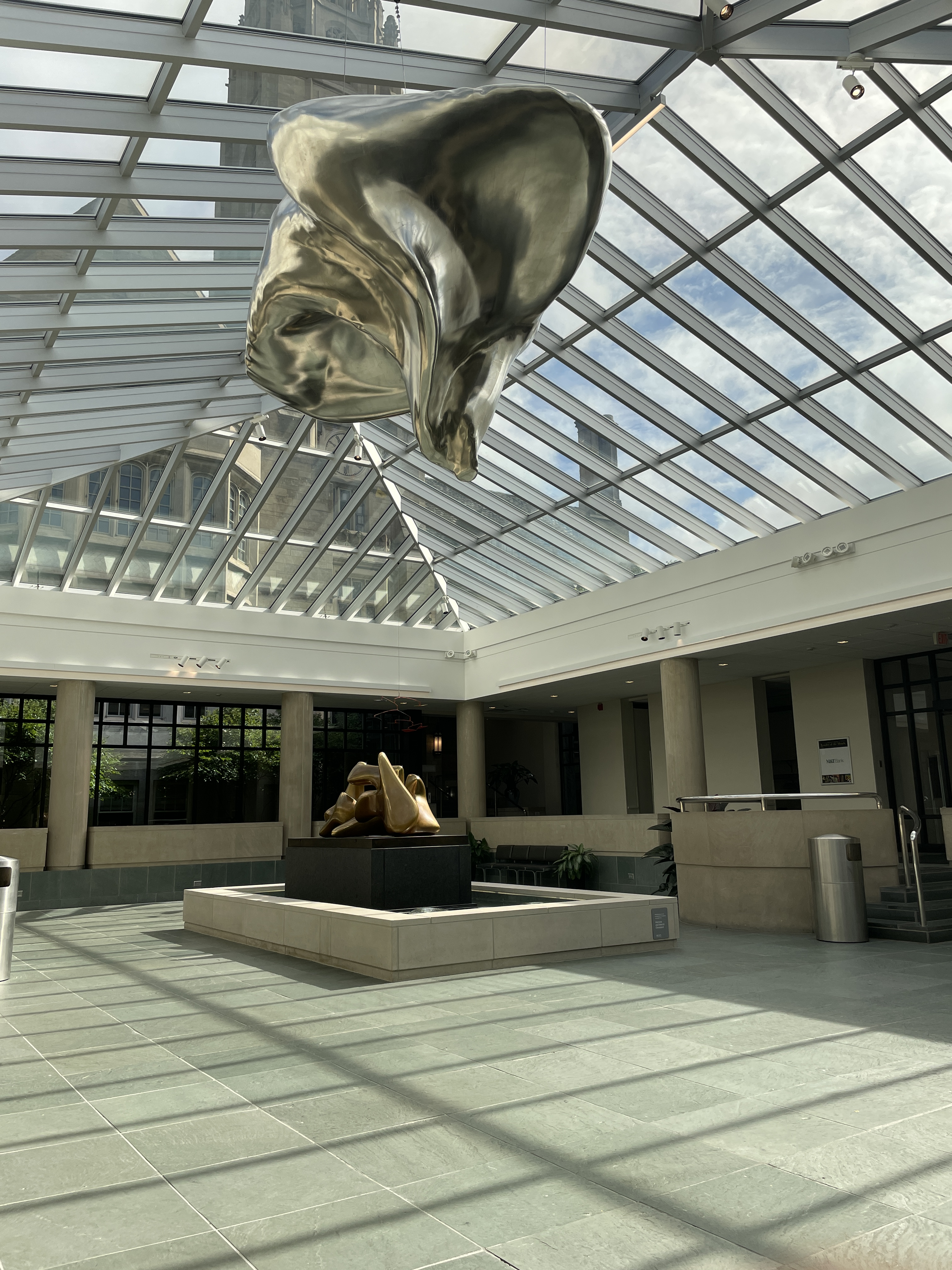
Interior of the Vanden Brul pavilion with sculptures by Henry Moore and Iñigo Manglano-Ovalle

== See also ==
- List of university art museums and galleries in New York State
