= L 'Abandonne (Georges Rouault) =

Painting by Georges Rouault

L'abandonné
- The Abandoned
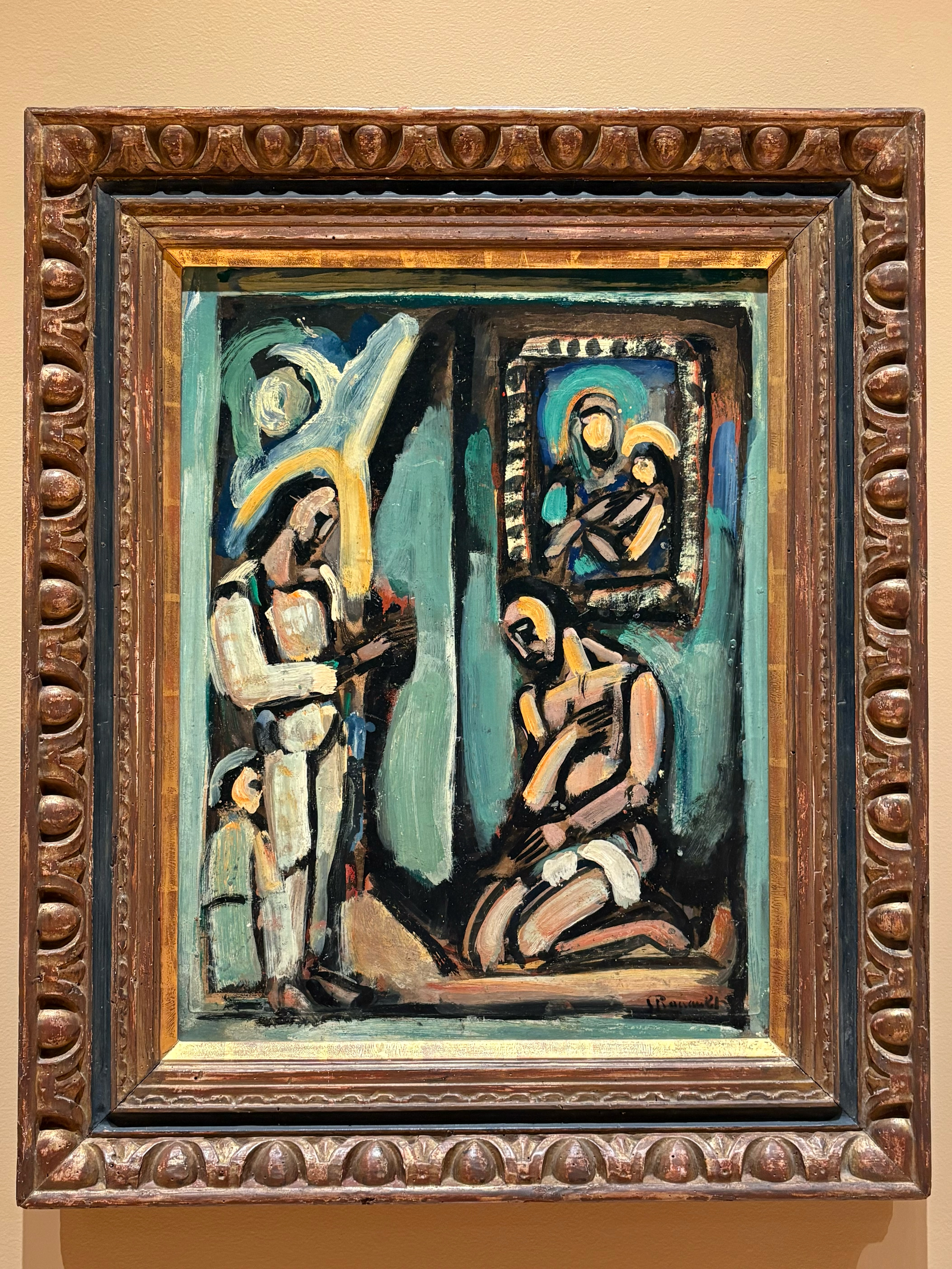
- Artist: Georges Rouault
- Year: c. 1935–1939
- Medium: oil painting
- Dimensions: 25 5/16 x 19 3/8 in. (64.3 x 49.2 cm)
- Location: Memorial Art Gallery, University of Rochester, Rochester, NY
- Accession: 1953.30

L 'Abandonne (c. 1935–1939) is a work by Georges Rouault, exploring humanitarian and religious concerns. The work attempts to evoke empathy, which is in line with Gustave Moreau's "inner vision" and often contrasts with Matisse's ideal of ease. The painting, as a composite process of etching on paper, overlaying oil paint and mounting on a wooden board, features thick outlines like "lead strips" and a grid-like contrast of light and shade. Scholars believe that this image is related to his background as a colored window apprentice and his printmaking training. Scholars relate this work’s redemptive tone to Miserere et Guerre, a multi-plate black-and-white print series that Rouault developed after World War I and later described as a summation of suffering answered by a plea for mercy since both are interpreted as deeply humanitarian.

== Style ==
Rouault's experience as an apprentice in the Hirsch colored window workshop since he was fourteen has been considered one of the important origins of his "colored window" structure and the thick black lines. Researchers have linked this treatment to the tradition of medieval Gothic Windows and Rouault's consistent appeal for religious compassion. He later recalled his fascination with the intense hues of stained glass, describing himself as "utterly intoxicated by color"—a passion that reveals his lifelong devotion to light and the spiritual depth of color. In his early days in Moreau's studio, Rouault was subconsciously inspired by Gothic stained windows. Around late 1903 or early 1904, he read Léon Bloy's novel "La Femme Pauvre", which deeply resonated with him spiritually. Afterward, Bloy also became Rouault's spiritual mentor and close friend for many years. Over time, Rouault's paintings increasingly adopted a Gothic style. He also recalled being hired by a shop owner who specialized in restoring glass fragments from old display windows. He worked with many defective pieces, which were to be changed into mosaic glass for windows. Their assembly and high-purity color pieces, different from paintings that seek depth or subtle lighting, inspired Rouault. This craft focused on structural division and color blocks. It shaped his preference for vivid colors and component-based compositions, later seen in his paintings as thick black outlines and zoned color blocks, similar to stained glass "lead strips.

== Theme and color ==
The themes of Rouault's works focus on faith, human nature and social suffering. He often depicted prostitutes, clowns, judges and commoners as the main characters, transforming the compassion of religion into the experience of the modern world. Scholar noted that these themes held distinct social and religious dual meanings in French art at the start of the 20th century; prostitutes represented both degradation and redemption, clowns depicted absurd humanity and compassion, while judges and vulgarians symbolized the paradox of hypocrisy and moral judgment. This gaze on "ugliness" and "ordinariness" enabled Ruor to extend religious themes into secular reality, as he wrote in his note:“主宰我的情感的选择的王是平民，也是权贵”(The sovereigns of my emotions and choices are the common people as well as the powerful).

Rouault once explicitly opposed academic and formalistic decorative paintings, emphasizing that art should embody the power, elegance, and enthusiasm of life, rather than the display of technique. He believes that a thoughtful painter should be sensitive and inventive in understanding form and color. Rouault's paintings are rich in color, as he believes that color should be a burst of passion and that colors themselves have spiritual significance, capable of conveying emotions of pain, compassion, and transcendence. Although his works differ significantly from the traditional academic style, he consistently believes that "tradition is in the air we breathe." Scholars consider Rouault's works "integrate the spirit of medieval faith into modern formal language", reigniting the visual power of religion in the secular culture of the 20th century.

== Technique ==
Scholars describe that Rouault often adopted a workflow of photo conversion, further in-depth etching, and finally manual reinforcement, which explains the layering effect between his prints and paintings.

== Relationship with Fauvists ==
The academic circle usually interprets Rouault's work within the framework of ethics, spirituality and redemption, regarding the empathy and compassion of the viewers as the core of the works. This orientation is often traced back to the teaching of his mentor Moreau, requiring students to "think about color" and pursue paintings that "elevate the mind". Researchers also juxtapose Rouault with Matisse and other Fauvists under Moreau, since their works bear the influence of Moreau's teachings about following inward feeling and feature extensive use of color. However, Matisse's artworks utilize vibrant tomes, while Rouault's works are mostly in dark tones, with themes often revolving around negative emotions such as evil, sadness, and suffering.
