= Portrait of a Young Man in an Armchair =

1660 painting by Rembrandt

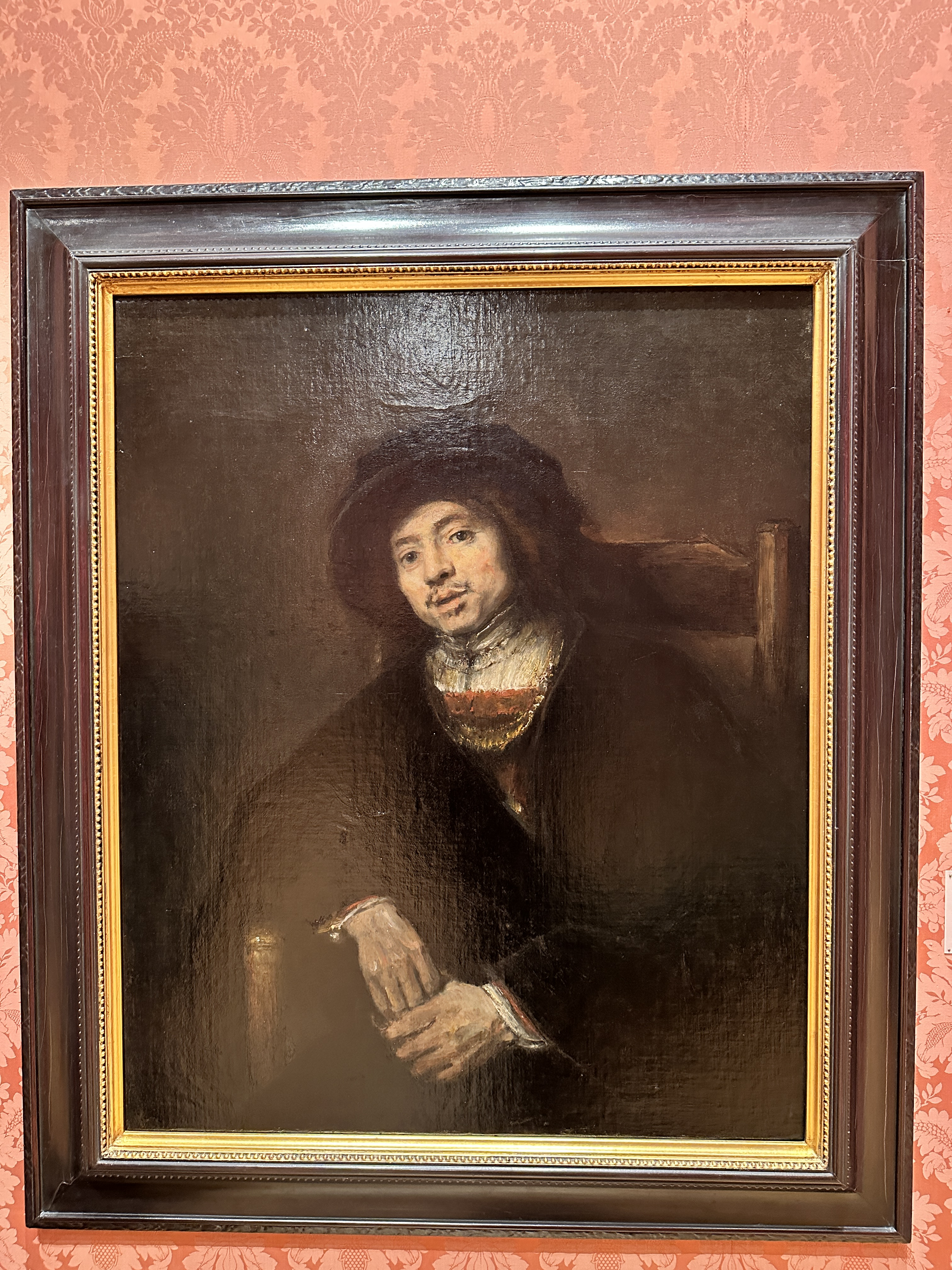
- Artist: Rembrandt
- Year: c. 1660
- Type: Oil on canvas
- Dimensions: 104.1 cm × 85.1 cm (41.0 in × 33.5 in)
- Location: Memorial Art Gallery, Rochester, New York
- Owner: George Eastman Collection
- Website: Memorial Art Gallery Online

Portrait of a Young Man in an Armchair is an oil painting on canvas, painted by Rembrandt. It is currently on display in the permanent exhibition in the Memorial Art Gallery at Rochester, New York in the United States. The painting was finished in 1660 and depicts a man leaning on an armchair.

== Description ==
Portrait of a Young Man in an Armchair is a painting from the Early Modern Europe, a 17th century Dutch painting with an art style now commonly known as Baroque. In the painting, the figure is shown to be placed in a dark background, wearing a shady costume while contrastingly appearing with a luminous face, a style of depiction commonly seen in Rembrandt's latter-day portraits.

== Background ==
Rembrandt was a renowned painter of the Dutch Golden Age, generally considered to be one of the greatest painters in the history of Western art. From his early works during his time in Leiden, to his final pieces, Rembrandt remained a searching artist who treated each of his works as "a new adventure". He repeatedly experimented with various painting techniques, narrative methods, and other painting styles. Around 1650, Rembrandt's style shifted towards a more austere and profound approach. Through the dramatic shift in tone and the subtle play of light and shadow, his portraits became more true to life, a psychological study of the sitter, rather than a flattering likeness. Portrait of a Young Man in an Armchair, in this instance, demonstrates Rembrandt's mastery of his technique at this stage of time.

== Technique ==
Portrait of a Young Man in an Armchair places the figure of the man in the center of the canvas, with a relaxed posture and slightly raised and tilted head. This oblique composition softens the seriousness of the portrait brought by the darkness of the background, providing a sense of intimacy to the image. The hands of the young man appear to be closer to the canvas, causing them to look visually larger compared to the rest of his body. This proportion draws attention as an expressive feature that balances the calmness of his face.

The young man wears a round hat, which helps to add weight to his head and create a visual balance between the upper and lower body, preventing him from appearing disproportionally heavy on the bottom. Also, the armchair that he leans on quietly extends out from the background, giving him a stable structural support. The overall arrangement highlights the presence of the figure and creates a naturally presented but thoughtfully considered composition.

Pronounced chiaroscuro, freely loaded impasto, and unified color schemes were incorporated in this painting, all of which are commonly recognized qualities of Rembrandt's art. Unlike other meticulously detailed portraits common in the mid-1600s, Rembrandt deliberately fades many details into darkness. He darkens the backdrop, making the figure's clothing blend into the shadow, and places nearly all of the visual emphasis on the illuminated areas of the face and hands. Impasto is used to create texture and highlight the reflective surfaces of the white collar and the skin. Moreover, the unified and predominantly earth-toned color scheme provides a warm and intimate atmosphere, concentrating the viewer's attention on the young man in the middle.

This portraiture incorporates several details to convey the inner psychology of the figure. The young man's darkened outfit distance himself from any clear social symbols, only the section of clothing exposed at the neck bore clean and bright characteristics. His head tilts slightly forward, his gaze towards the viewer is soft and unfocused, without any direct declaration of status. His hands rest loosely rather than being tense, giving openness and kindness. The softened mouth, the smooth eyebrows, and the relaxed shoulders present humility rather than being formal or authoritative.

== Exhibition ==
This work is included as part of the permanent collection in The Memorial Art Gallery in Rochester, New York.

In 2019, the painting went through a wide range of scientific analysis, including high-resolution imaging and X-ray fluorescence scanning, to learn more about its surface features, underdrawings, and elemental composition of its materials. In a special exhibition, Under the Microscope: Rembrandt's Portrait of a Young Man in an Armchair, held by the Memorial Art Gallery from December 8, 2023, to June 16, 2024, this detailed information about the materials and history of the painting forms the basis for an interactive computer program for exhibition visitors.

== See also ==
- List of paintings by Rembrandt
