= Unfinished portrait of Nathaniel Hurd =

Unfinished painting by John Singleton Copley

Unfinished Portrait of Nathaniel Hurd
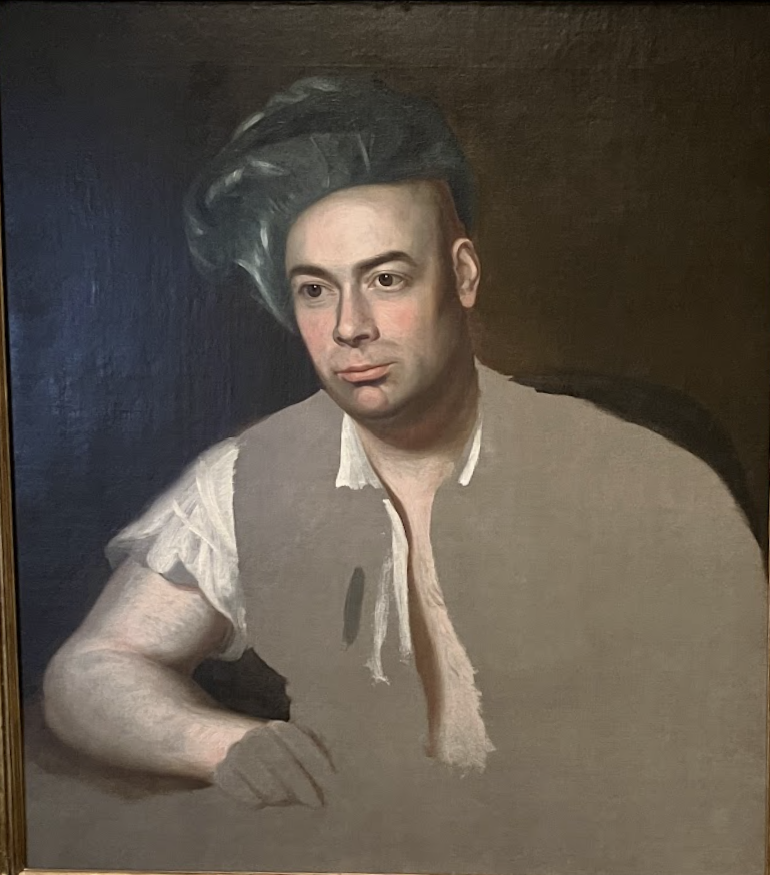
- Artist: John Singleton Copley
- Year: 1765
- Medium: Oil on canvas
- Dimensions: (24 5/8 in × 29 3/8 in)
- Location: Memorial Art Gallery, Rochester
- Accession: 1944.2

Unfinished Portrait of Nathaniel Hurd is an oil painting created by John Singleton Copley, likely created in 1765. It measures 29 3/8 inches by 24 5/8 inches (74.6 cm by 62.5 cm). The portrait depicts Bostonian silversmith, Nathaniel Hurd, who lived from 1730 to 1777, and was part of a notable silversmith family.

== Description ==
Nathaniel Hurd is the subject of this painting, in which his face, right arm and a sliver of his chest are mostly rendered. Large gray splotches make up the rest of his silhouette, which appears to be seated at a desk, obscuring his lower body. Most of the gray is a flat color, indicating that Copley had not yet begun any painting in those areas, though some parts of the gray form have some shadows exhibited. Hurd is looking off to the left side of the frame with an indiscernible expression on his mouth and rosy cheeks among his pale complexion. He is in front of a nearly pitch-black background, with only a faint orange glow behind his head, suggesting Copley would also later paint the background. Hurd can be seen wearing a blue hat, seemingly based on a Turkish turban, which would have been seen as a status symbol of refined taste and foreign imports. What can be seen of his blouse is a loose, short sleeve white shirt with its front unbuttoned and open, though not much of his shirt is painted at all. His right hand seems to be resting on a desk, shown by his gray, unpainted, yet lined fingers casting shadow on an unfinished object.

Hurd was a Bostonian silversmith who lived from 1730 to 1777, in the city at the same time as Copley, who lived in several different cities in his life. He was an apprentice to his father, Jacob Hurd and was one of the first and most prominent silversmithing families in the soon-to-be country. He became well regarded in New England, making pieces for Dartmouth College, Brown University and Harvard College, as well as other groups and high-class families in the area. During the economic crisis that lead to the American Revolution, Hurd struggled financially and succumbed to an illness in 1777.

== Techniques ==
Nathaniel Hurd by John Singleton Copley. 1765 Boston, Massachusetts. Oil on Canvas. 30 x 25 1/2 in. Located in the Cleveland Museum of Art

Despite many details of this painting never coming to fruition, the lack of or partial completion of a fraction of the canvas reveals information on Copley's painting process. The gray underneath acts as "dead color", a primer that would make paints more vibrant on top of it, though what is completed is still of a muted hue, especially compared to the vibrant and ornate clothing of the completed Hurd portrait. The background appears to be complete, as well as Hurd's face, neck and cap, suggesting that Copley first worked on Hurd's facial area as to capture the most important part of the portrait first and foremost.

While his studio conditions are not fully known, he was a solitary painter, lacking an assistant, which was common at the time. He focused on the face of the subject first, capturing the most recognizable part of a sitter, who was often a high-class member who cared about their image. Copley also painted the face with more layers, rendering more detail and color, which can perhaps be see in the Unfinished Portrait of Nathaniel Hurd, with Hurd's rosy face in stark contrast to his blue, almost corpselike arm. Many of Copley's other subjects were depicted to impress, with mannerisms, ornate clothing and an enlightened background creating the image of a modern, respectable elite. Why the first portrait of Hurd was not completed is unknown, though it is theorized that Hurd was not happy with being portrayed as a commoner artisan in his craft.

== Finished portrait ==
There is a complete portrait of Hurd painted by Copley on display at the Cleveland Museum of Art. What is visible of his clothes displays a less formal work attire compared to the contemporary standard of a finely dressed subject, which is a change made in the completed portrait. Hurd's initial depiction was likely meant to show an artisan at his workstation, which was an uncommon style in portraiture, but perhaps also why the painting was not completed. Hurd's posture was also altered between versions, with his body square to the viewer, directly looking at the observer in the finalized portrait and a slightly hunched pose with his gaze to the side in the unfinished painting.

== Similar works ==
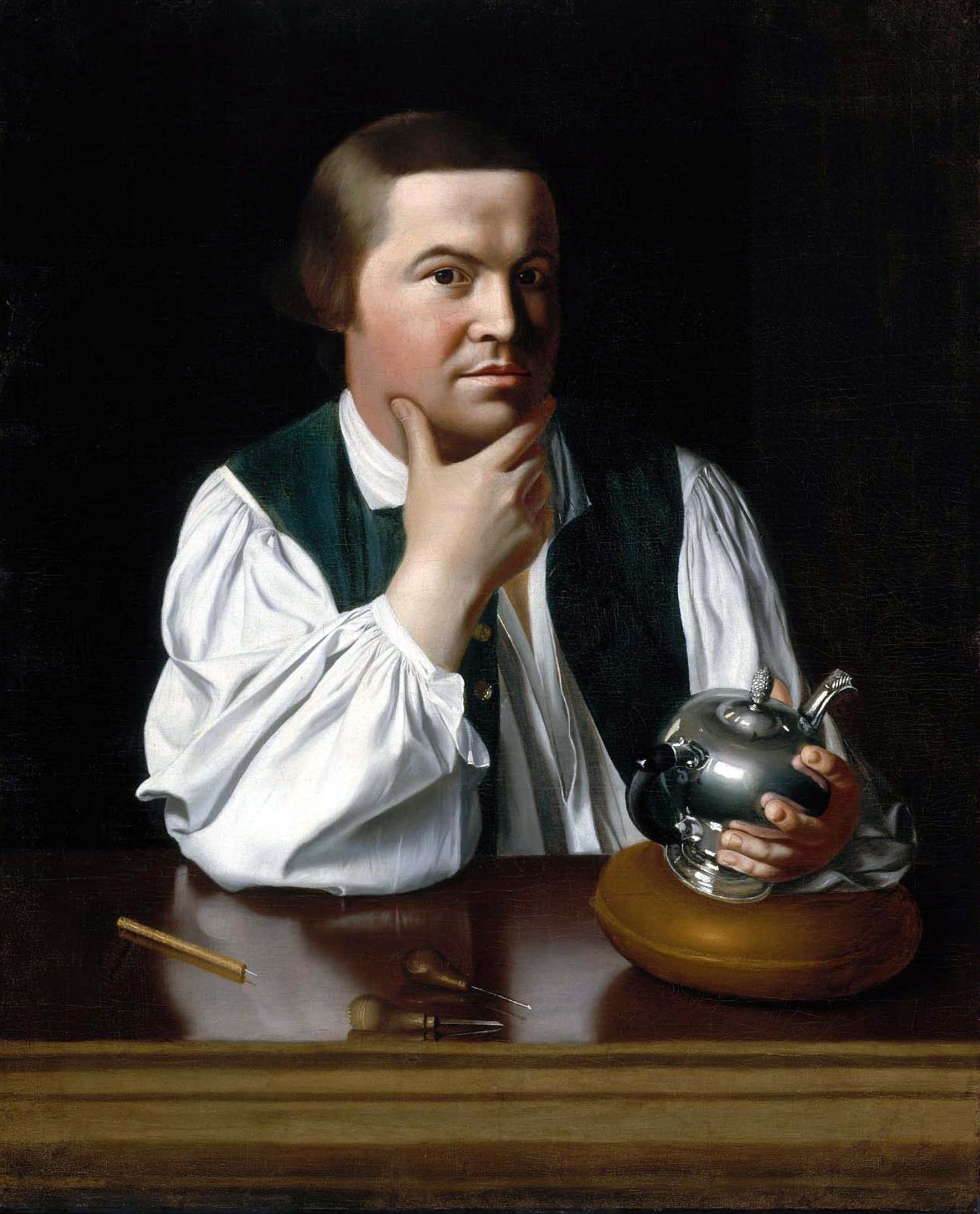
Portrait of Paul Revere (1768)

Copley is perhaps best known for his portrait of Paul Revere, painted in 1768. Similarities can be drawn between the incomplete portrait of Hurd and Revere, notably their casual attire and labor-based settings. This is theorized to be as a result of their shared occupation and Copley's experimentation with portraiture, but no concrete interpretation was documented at the time. Unlike Copley's completed portrait of Hurd and Revere, the unfinished version is not looking directly at the viewer, but off to our left, almost unaware of his painter. It is unclear why Copley also portrayed Revere in such a different way from his contemporaries, as it differs from most of Copley's other work, but their shared occupation of silversmith offers an answer in their hot workplaces, prompting a way to cool off.

== Provenance ==
This painting belonged to Nathaniel Hurd, despite its incompletion and passed to his sister upon his death. It stayed in her new family with John Furness until their descendant, Horace Howard Furness Jayne, sold it to the Memorial Art Gallery in Rochester, New York, in 1944.
