= John Scholl =

German-born American woodcarver

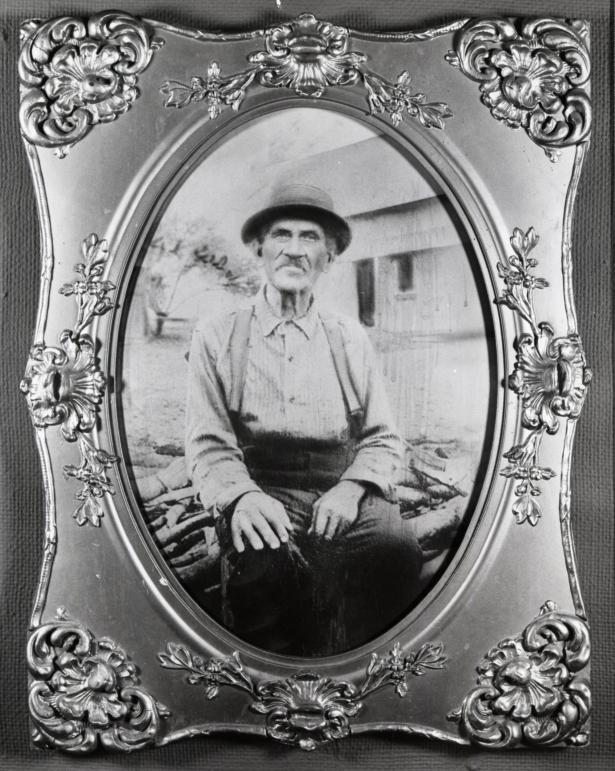
- Portrait of John Scholl. c. 1900. The American Folk Art Museum, Germania, PA.
- Born: Johannes Scholl; 26 July 1827; Münsingen, Germany
- Died: February 26, 1916 (aged 88); Abbotts Township, Pennsylvania, United States
- Known for: Wood carving
- Spouse: Augusta Kushmaul (m. 1853; died 1890)

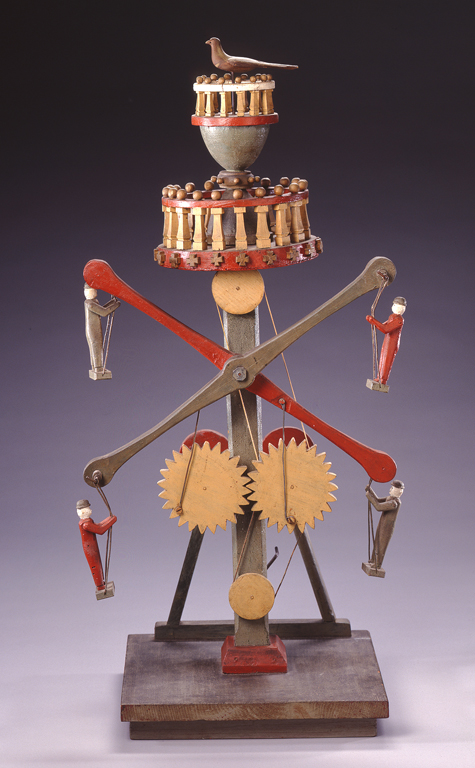
¨Acrobats¨, ca. 1910. The Michael and Julie Hall Collection of American Folk Art. Carved and painted wood with metal and leather.

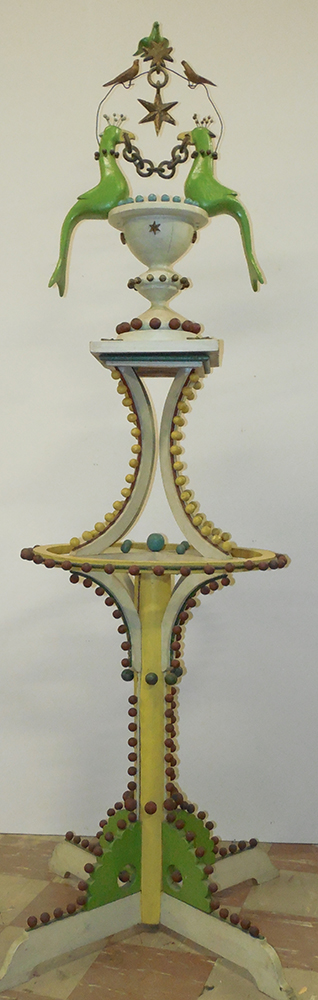
¨Fountain with Peacocks¨, The State Museum of Pennsylvania. Gifted by The Stony Point Folk Art Gallery to The State Museum of Pennsylvania in 1969.

Johannes Scholl (8 July 1827 – 26 February 1916) was a German-American woodcarver who rose to notoriety years after his death. He is known for only using a jackknife and paint to create his colorful and symbolic wood sculptures. He is regarded today as being one of the most influential folk artists of the 20th century.

== Biography ==
=== Birth and childhood ===
He was born Johannes Scholl on 8 July 1827, in Münsingen, Baden-Württemberg, Germany to Johann Friedrich and Maria Margaretha Bleher, the second youngest of nine children. He was baptized in Münsingen's Evangelical church the day he was born. Little is known about Scholl's life before he left Germany but he likely received training in carpentry in his native country because of the experience level he had when he settled in Pennsylvania as a young man.

=== Marriage and children ===
Scholl married Augusta Kushmaul on November 28, 1853 in Germany. Scholl left his native Germany shortly after marrying Augusta and arrived in the United States that same year. Soon after immigrating, Scholl anglicized his name from Johannes to John. the couple remained married until Augusta's death. All of the Scholl's children were born in Pennsylvania:

- Emma Scholl (12 February 1855 – 13 September 1946)
- Henry Scholl (17 November 1856 – 1868)
- Rosanna “Rose” Scholl (14 July 1859 – 9 November 1942)
- Edward Carl Scholl (1862 – 1931)
- Frederick Scholl (7 February 1872 – 22 October 1929)

=== Early life in the United States ===
Scholl and his new wife arrived in a settlement called Germania. The area was mostly forests by the time Scholl had arrived. Germania also had a high concentration of German immigrants who arrived after the failed democratic revolution of 1848. The Scholls first lived in Schuylkill County, Pennsylvania in 1853 and later moved to Abbott Township, Pennsylvania, in 1870. Scholl contributed to his new community as a carpenter by building the Germania Hotel, the local brewery, and some of the first homes in the area. Scholl even built his own home and farmhouse. A devout Lutheran throughout his adulthood Scholl and his immediate family worshipped at the local St. Matthaeus Lutheran Church which he also helped build

=== Later life and death ===
Scholl only started his woodworking after retiring at the age of eighty and he enjoyed making his wood sculptures. He created forty-five known pieces, some of them were large sculptures, while others were smaller like toys, and small puzzles. His carpentry skills influenced his woodwork with Victorian architecture design features like spindles and gingerbread brackets, he also used bright colors like mustard yellow, white, soft blue, and green that were once popular exterior colors of homes in the late 1800s. Many of his works included wooden wheels of fortune that were often seen at American carnivals and events after the 1900s. Sometimes when the weather was nice Scholl would take his woodworks out of his barn and bring them outside, around 1907 he began to hold viewing tours and much of the local community enjoyed his work. Scholl died on 26 February 1916 at 6pm at his home from pneumonia which he contracted after shoveling snow. He was buried on 29 February 1916 at Germania Cemetery in Abbott Township, Pennsylvania.

== Legacy ==
One of Scholl´s sons continued to display Scholl's work for fifteen years after his death. His family later lost interest in his work and his sculptures remained forgotten in his barn until his grandchildren rediscovered his work in the 1960s. His descendants later brought his work to The Stony Point Folk Art Gallery where his work was discovered by Adele Earnest and Cordelia Hamilton who were both joint owners of the gallery. Earnest and Hamilton later exhibited his work in 1967 at The Willard Gallery. The thirty-seven pieces on display were well received and gained notoriety from art collectors across the United States. Many of Scholl´s work can be found in museums across the country like The State Museum of Pennsylvania, The Milwaukee Art Museum, and The Whitney Museum of Art. He is regarded today as one of the most influential Pennsylvanian folk artists of the 20th century.
