= Alethea Hill Platt =

American artist and educator (1860–1932)

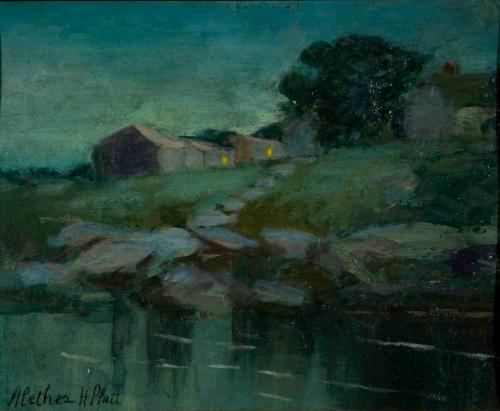
Shore Landscape at Dusk by Alethea Hill Platt, Zimmerli Art Museum, Rutgers University

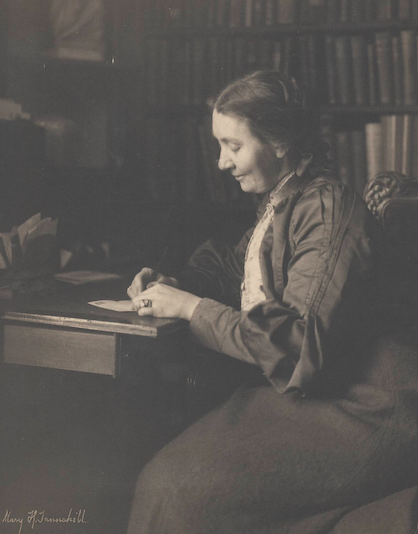
Alethea Hill Platt photographed by Mary Tannahill

Alethea Hill Platt (December 31, 1860 – May 23, 1932) was an American artist and educator. Her paintings of rural landscapes in France, England, the Adirondacks, and New England were displayed in about 200 exhibitions at venues including the National Academy of Design, Pennsylvania Academy of the Fine Arts, and Louisiana Purchase Exposition. The New York Times found a "quality of serenity, even a kind of nobility" in her work, and American Art News placed her "in the ranks of America's leading women painters."

== Biography ==
Alethea (pronounced uh-LEE-thee-uh) Platt was one of about nine children of Laura Sherbrook Popham (1826-1905) and Lewis Canfield Platt (1818-1893), a judge in White Plains, N.Y. Laura's grandmother Mary Morris was a daughter of the judge and politician Richard Morris. (The family's 18th-century ancestral homes are extant in Scarsdale at 60 Crane Road and 1015 Post Road.) Platt trained with the artists Henry B. Snell and Ben Foster and took courses at the Art Students League, Columbia University's Teachers College and the Delécluse academy in Paris. As a child, she “showed a preference for drawing pictures beyond all other interests.” She studied Snell's scrub technique for watercolors, “boldly smashing in the masses of color on the dry paper with bristle brushes.”

Until 1898, Platt lived and worked at 41 Fifth Avenue, the Manhattan home of a relative, the philanthropist Rachel Lenox Kennedy (1827-1898), a daughter of David Sproat Kennedy. Kennedy treated Platt like a daughter, and they supported charitable causes including the Presbyterian Rest for Convalescents. After Kennedy's death, a nephew maneuvered to disinherit Platt, and she moved to the Van Dyck Studios at 939 Eighth Avenue. Her circle of artist friends and neighbors included Charlotte B. Coman, Fanny Griswold Ely, Rhoda Holmes Nicholls, Clara Weaver Parrish, Helen Watson Phelps, Emily Maria Scott, C. Helen Simpson, Mary Harvey Tannahill, and Arabella Locke Wyant, the widow of Alexander Helwig Wyant. Platt was considered “unusually intelligent, witty and broad-minded.” At her studio, she gave classes and held open houses. She summered in England (particularly Devonshire), France (frequently Brittany), Germany, and the Netherlands as well as in the Adirondacks, Maine, Woodstock, N.Y., the Berkshires, and Sharon, Conn.

Her characteristic subject matters were cottage gardens, villagers in workshops and kitchens, sunlit woods, harbor workers, and rocky seacoasts. Sitters for her handful of portraits included her father, her brother William Popham Platt, and her nephew Stuart Dean Platt. She belonged to organizations including the Allied Artists of America, American Water Color Society, Art Alliance of America, Art Workers' Club for Women (which provided support for artists' models), National Academy of Design, National Arts Club, National Association of Women Artists, New York Water Color Club, Pen and Brush Club, New York Society of Painters (which she helped run), and Yonkers Art Association. “Self-sufficient and resourceful,” Platt remained prolific throughout her career. She died suddenly following an operation (her estate was valued at $81,574).

== Exhibitions and reviews ==
Her works appeared in group shows at institutions including the Albright-Knox Art Gallery, Art Institute of Chicago, Cincinnati Art Museum, Columbia University, Corcoran Gallery of Art, Detroit Institute of Arts, National Academy of Design, National Arts Club, Pennsylvania Academy of the Fine Arts, Pratt Institute, St. Louis Art Museum, and Toledo Museum of Art. Group shows with her work were presented by the Allied Artists of America, American Federation of Arts, American Water Color Society, Art Alliance of America, Art Club of Philadelphia, Baltimore Watercolor Club, Boston Art Club, Catharine Lorillard Wolfe Art Club, General Federation of Women's Clubs, MacDowell Club, National Association of Women Artists, New York Society of Painters, New York Water Color Club, Pen and Brush Club, Philadelphia Watercolor Club, Salons of America, Society of Independent Artists, and Yonkers Art Association. Her artworks appeared at state fairs as well and the Louisiana Purchase Exposition. Among the galleries that displayed her work in group shows were Arlington Galleries, Knoedler Gallery, Macbeth Gallery, Modern Art Gallery in London, and Powell Art Gallery. She had solo shows at Georges A. Glaenzer's gallery and Powell Art Gallery. She organized two-woman shows with colleagues including Ruth Payne Burgess (Arlington Galleries), Fanny Griswold Ely (Ellespie Studio in Sharon, a Platt family home), Gladys Brannigan (Arts Club of Washington), and Arabella Locke Wyant (Van Dyck Studios).

She received awards from organizations including the Minnesota State Art Society (1909), National Association of Women Artists (watercolor prize, 1903), and National League of American Pen Women (Brodie art prize, 1928). Students influenced by her include the painters Marion Hastings and Grace Russell and the designer and educator Dorothy Ross Carmer.

Reviewers praised the "forceful appeal" and “atmospheric qualities” of her dappled glades and rustic hearths. She was also known for achieving “rhythm of line, beauty of color and general charm.”

== Legacy ==
Institutions that own Platt's artworks include the Anderson Public Library in Indiana (An Old World Garden), Wesleyan College in Macon, Georgia (Cottage Scene), and Zimmerli Art Museum at Rutgers University (Shore Landscape at Dusk, 2002.0183). Archival repositories with her correspondence include the Jones Library in Amherst, Mass. (John and Ruth Burgess Collection) and the Archives of American Art's Macbeth Gallery records (Series I, correspondence files).
