= On a French River =

Painting by Emma Lampert Cooper

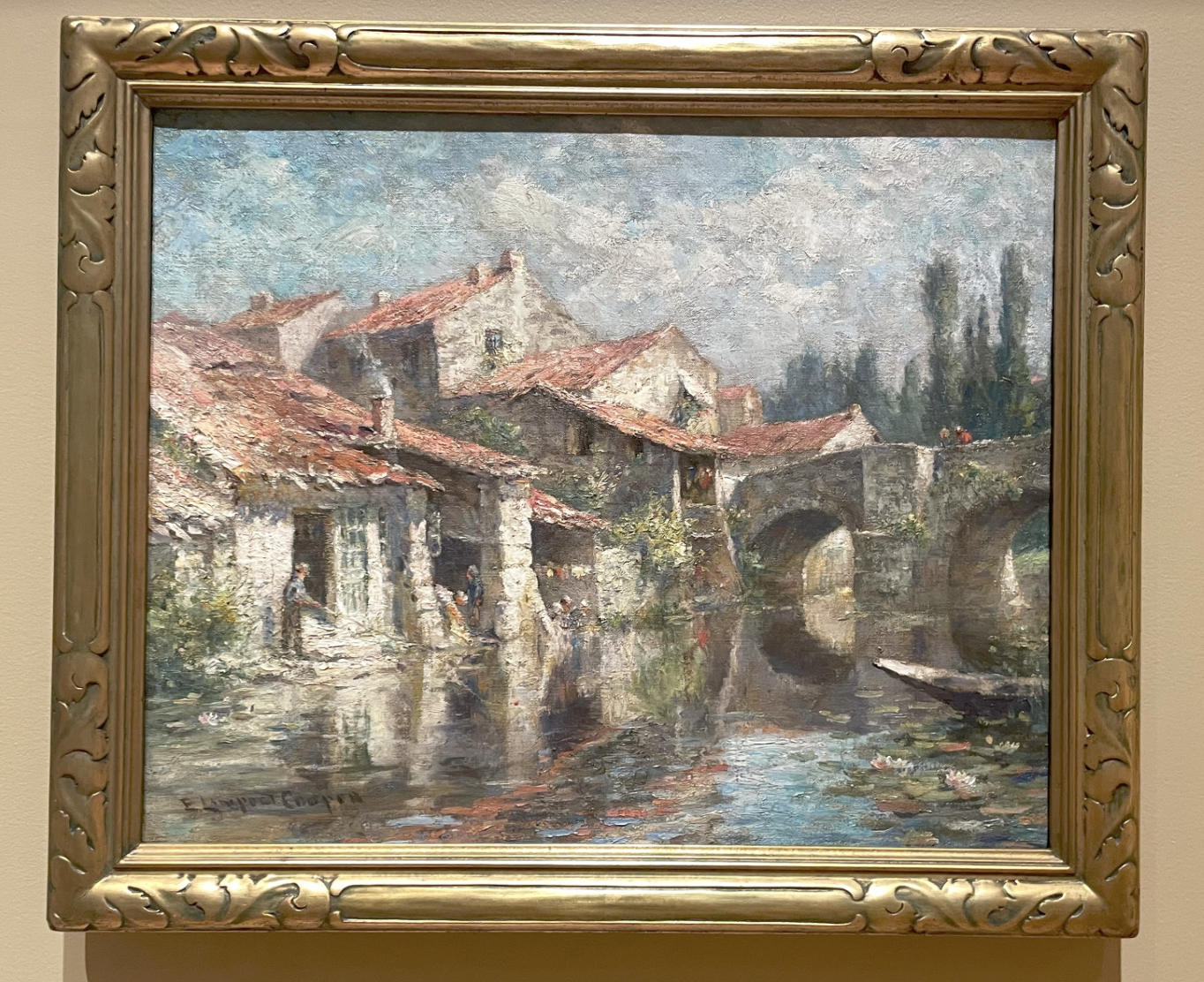
- On a French River on display in 2023
- Artist: Emma Lampert Cooper
- Year: late 1800s
- Medium: Oil on canvas
- Movement: Impressionism
- Dimensions: 45.7 cm × 56.2 cm (18.0 in × 22.1 in)
- Location: Memorial Art Gallery, Rochester, New York

On a French River is an impressionist oil painting on canvas painted by the artist Emma Lampert Cooper during the late 1800s. It is a landscape painting that depicts a river scene in Parthenay, France. It is part of the permanent collection at the Memorial Art Gallery (MAG) in Rochester, New York.Emma Lampert Cooper's husband, Colin Campbell Cooper, also produced similar paintings in the same location when they traveled together. Specifically, the paintings titled Port St. Jacques, Parthenay, France, and A View of a European Village. Both of these paintings have been auctioned in the past and are privately owned.

== Location and conservation ==
On a French River was a gift of the couple Mildred and Alted Boylan to the Memorial Art Gallery 1996. It was also conserved in 2008 as a gift from Mildred and Alted Boylan. The painting is part of the permanent collection in the American Impressionism category at the Memorial Art Gallery.

== Subject and interpretation ==
On the back of the painting On a French River, the following words are inscribed: "A.P. Parthenay, France 215" or "At Parthenay, France / 215." Indicating that the painting depicts a town located in the Nouvelle-Aquitaine region in western France. The river Thouet flows through the town of Parthenay with medieval bridges spanning over it.

On a French River is one of the many impressionist landscape paintings by Emma Lampert Cooper. Impressionist painters often depicted landscape scenes with everyday people as their main subjects. They did this to capture both the ordinary working class and the bourgeoisie class. Their paintings frequently highlighted suburban and rural settings instead of cities.

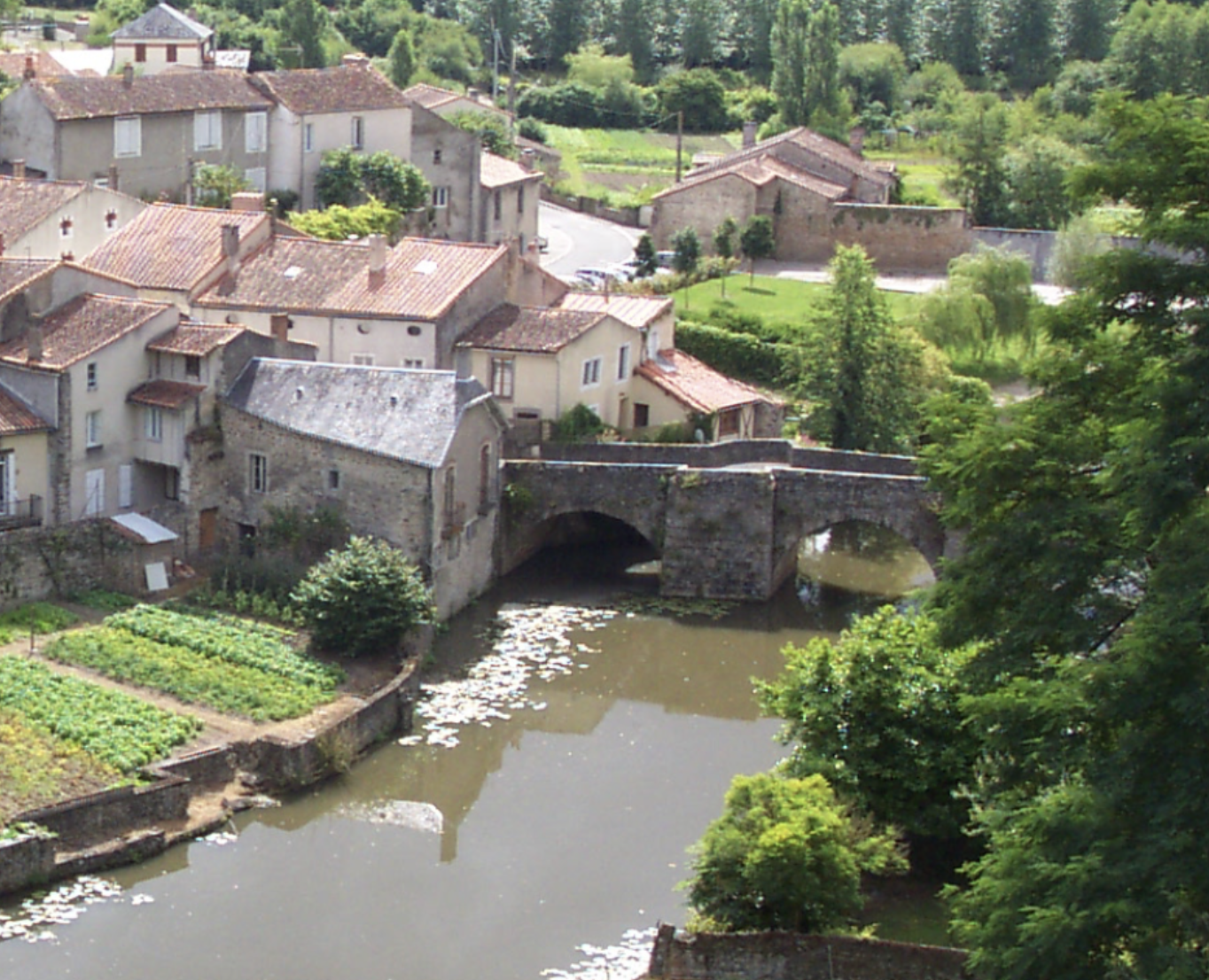
Parthenay, France

== Impressionism and Parisian influences ==
Location of Parthenay in France

=== Impressionism characteristics ===
In the painting, the American artist Emma Lampert Cooper adopts impressionism, a distinct artistic style known for narrow, small, discernible brushwork. She also applies short and thick paint strokes, a popular impressionist technique called impasto. This technique gives a rough, three-dimensional texture to the canvas. In addition, impressionist artists tend to emphasize contrasting light and dark values next to each other with colors straight out of the paint tube instead of mixing the colors. They often depicted people in motion, highlighting the effect of time passing.

=== The Rise of Impressionism ===
The artistic movement, Impressionism, was developed by a collective of artists based in Paris during the 19th century. The movement gained prominence through exhibitions of these artists in the 1870s and 1880s. Artists such as Claude Monet, Auguste Renoir, Edgar Degas, and Paul Cézanne had a significant influence on the movement of impressionism through their first exhibition in Paris in 1874.

=== Influence of Impressionism on American Artists ===
Starting from the 1860s, American painters eagerly embraced European ideals. American artists studied art as students in Paris. For example, the American artist Marry Cassatt closely associated herself with French artists Edgar Degas and Édouard Manet in terms of artistic style during the mid-1870s. Other American artists such as John Singer Sargent also associated themselves with impressionism during the late 1800s.

According to the magazine Gazette des Femmes, there were roughly three thousand active women artists in France during 1883. One-third of them were American women artists who came to Paris every year. During this time, Impressionism was one of the first movements that included women as its participants.

=== Emma Lampert Cooper's Artistic Studies in Paris ===
The artist Emma Lampert Cooper also studied in Paris. She was born in Nunda, NY, she was first taught art by Agnes D. Abatt at Cooper Union and the Art Students League in New York City. She then left New York to study art in Paris at the art school Académie Delécluse under Harry Thompson around 1885, shortly after the popularization of the impressionist movement.

== Challenges Faced by Women Artists in Nineteenth-century Paris ==
=== Restricted Opportunities to prestigious art institutions ===
During the nineteenth century, It was widely regarded as inappropriate for women to study the male nude which was a core curriculum of art institutions. Therefore, Women were cut off completely from prestigious art institutions. They often had difficulty finding a studio or a master that would accept them. Women were forced into private studios or female-only academies. As a result, Emma Cooper also attended art schools which consisted of primarily women artists.

=== Resistance from the Paris Salon ===
Since 1887, women's work has also met with growing resistance from the Paris Salon because it was controlled by a group of male artists. The Salon often rejected the works of these women artists and thus limited their potential for significant awards or achievement. Furthermore, women artists were always referred to by their first and last names when exhibiting their art, or even with the word Madame before their names to emphasize their female identity in France. This practice denied women's right to receive unbiased judgment on their artworks.

=== Restriction of women's freedom ===
It was socially unacceptable for young women to walk alone in the countryside because it would compromise their reputation. This social norm limited their ability to paint en plein air (act of painting outdoors) which was a popular painting strategy often imposed by impressionist artists.

== Related paintings by Emma Lampert Cooper's husband Colin Campbell Cooper ==
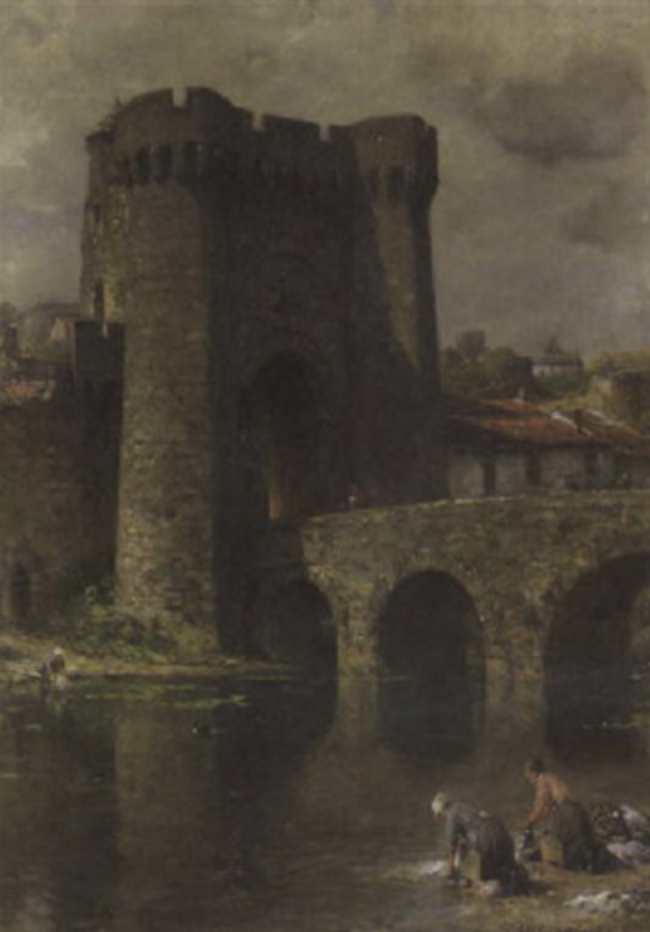
Port St. Jacques, Parthenay, France by Colin Campbell Cooper

=== Port St. Jacques, Parthenay, France by Colin Campbell Cooper ===
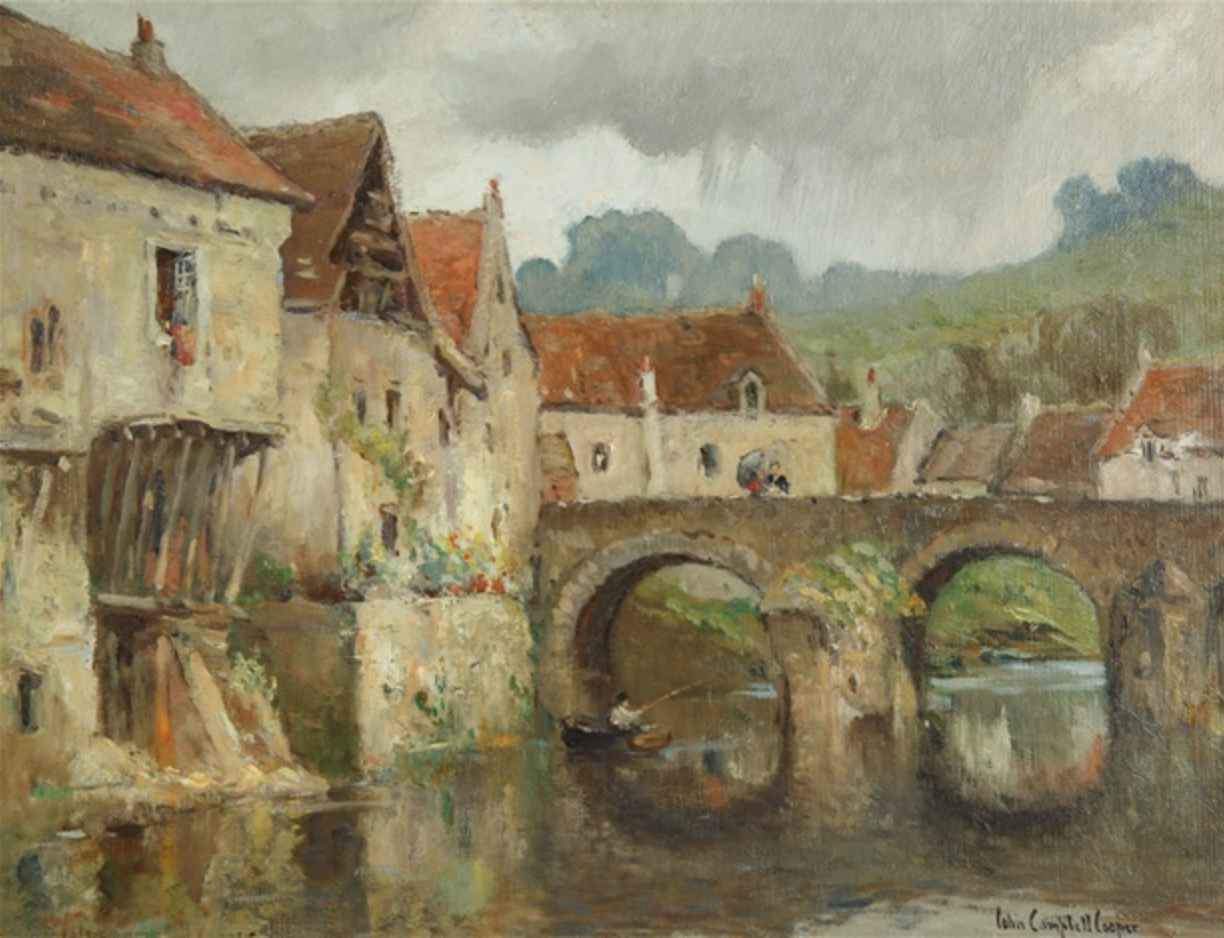
A View of a European Village by Colin Campbell Cooper

Emma Lampert Cooper's husband, Colin Campbell Cooper, was also a renowned artist. He created a painting depicting the same location as "On a French River," titled "Port St. Jacques, Parthenay, France." This artwork captures the stone arch bridges and the battlement at Parthenay, France. Similar to Emma's painting, it is an oil-on-canvas piece. However, Colin's work is larger and vertical in composition, measuring 91.4 cm × 66 cm (36.0 in × 26.0 in). This piece has been auctioned in the past and is privately owned.

=== A View of a European Village by Colin Campbell Cooper ===
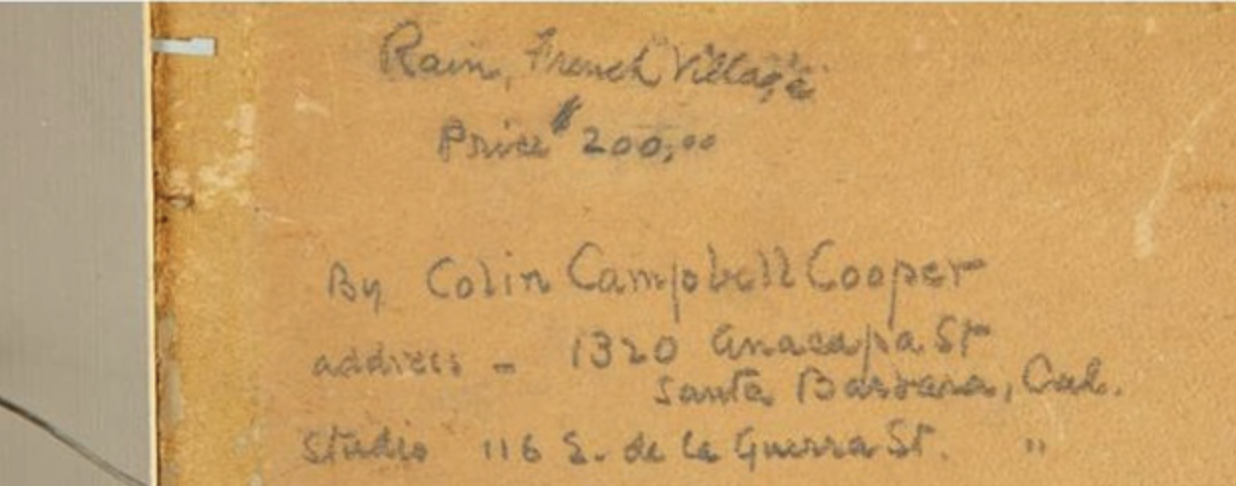
Handwritten notes on the back of A View of a European Village by Colin Campbell Cooper

In addition to the painting "Port St. Jacques, Parthenay, France," Colin Campbell Cooper has another artwork titled "A View of a European Village." While it is uncertain whether this painting also depicts Parthenay, France, it is strikingly similar to "On a French River" in terms of its composition.

The back of this painting is a short, handwritten note by Colin Campbell Cooper. The pencil markings state: "Rain, French Village Price $200.00," followed by his name, address, and the location of his studio. This painting is oil on board and measures 39 cm × 49 cm (15.5 in × 19.5 in). This piece has been auctioned in the past and is privately owned.

== Nineteenth-Century Oil Painting ==
=== Pigment Development in the Nineteenth-Century ===
"On a French River" is a nineteenth-century oil painting of an outdoor scene. During this period, numerous new pigments were developed due to new technological developments in the field of chemistry and organic chemistry. Experiments were conducted to discover the chemistry of oil paints. For example, French chemist Michel Eugène Chevreul performed a set of scientific experiments on how pigments reacted with oils during the 1840s.

The process of creating in this medium involves mixing pigments of paint and one or more drying oils. The oils work as a binder to create this style's distinctive texture. The paint is then applied to the canvas. Popular drying oils used by artists include linseed oil, poppy seed oil, walnut oil, and safflower oil. Different types of oils modify the properties of the paint. Depending on the oil used, the consistency, drying time, yellowing, plasticity, and transparency of the paint changes. Resin can also be boiled with the oil or independently applied to the painting. Resin provides a clear, protective coating and gives the painting a glossy look.

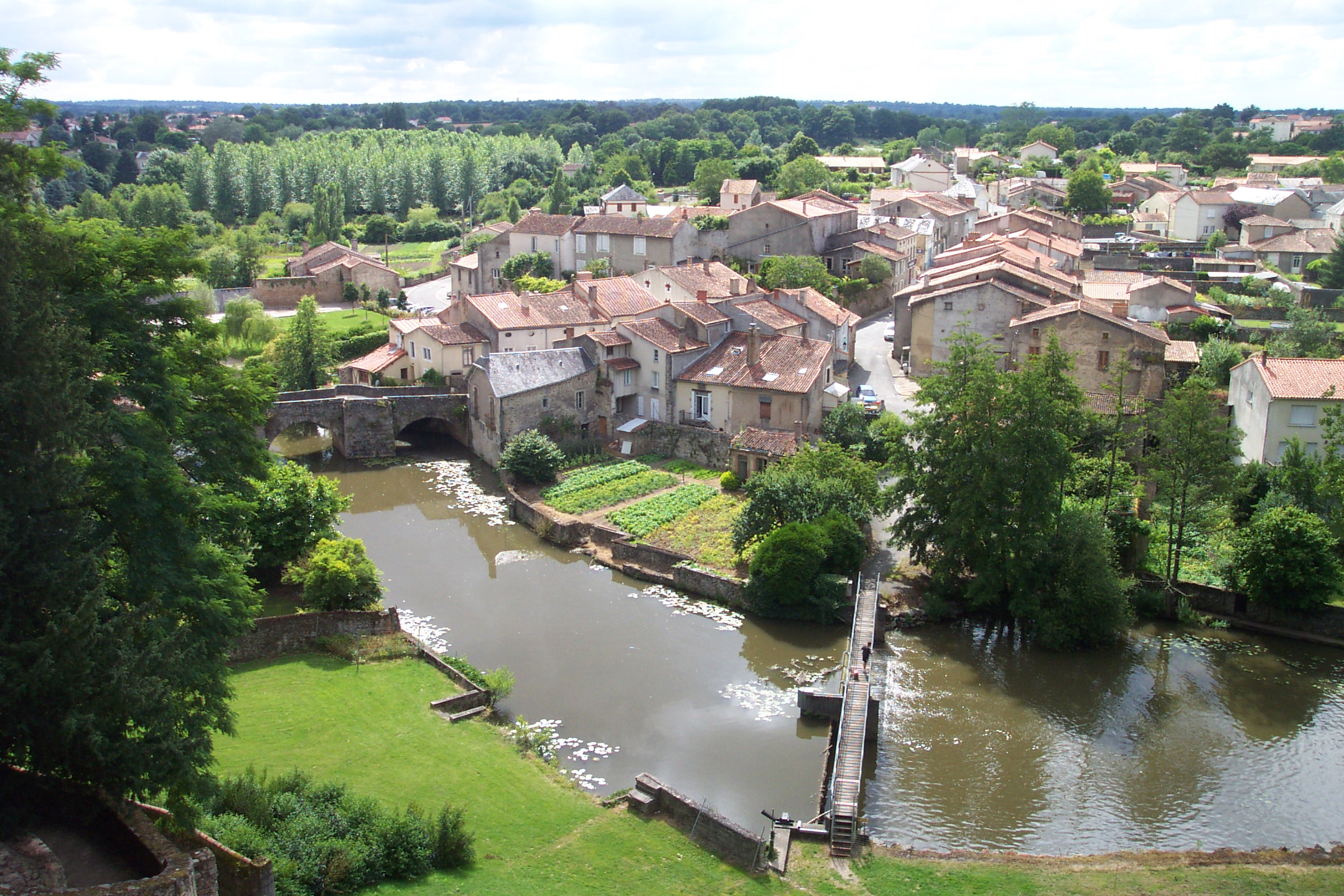
Parthenay Saint-Paul from a battlement

=== Adaptation for Outdoor Painting ===
As a result of the increasing popularity of outdoor landscape paintings, artists typically used easily transportable easels and paint boxes, along with lightweight and cost-effective materials such as millboard and paper mounted on backings, in addition to traditional panels and canvases. This allowed them to conveniently carry their art supplies outdoors to conduct landscape painting studies.

=== Studio Work ===
While many impressionist artists chose to start their work en plein air (act of painting outdoors). However, they often completed their paintings in the controlled environment of their studios. This change of location allowed them to refine their paintings and apply finishing touches to their artwork.

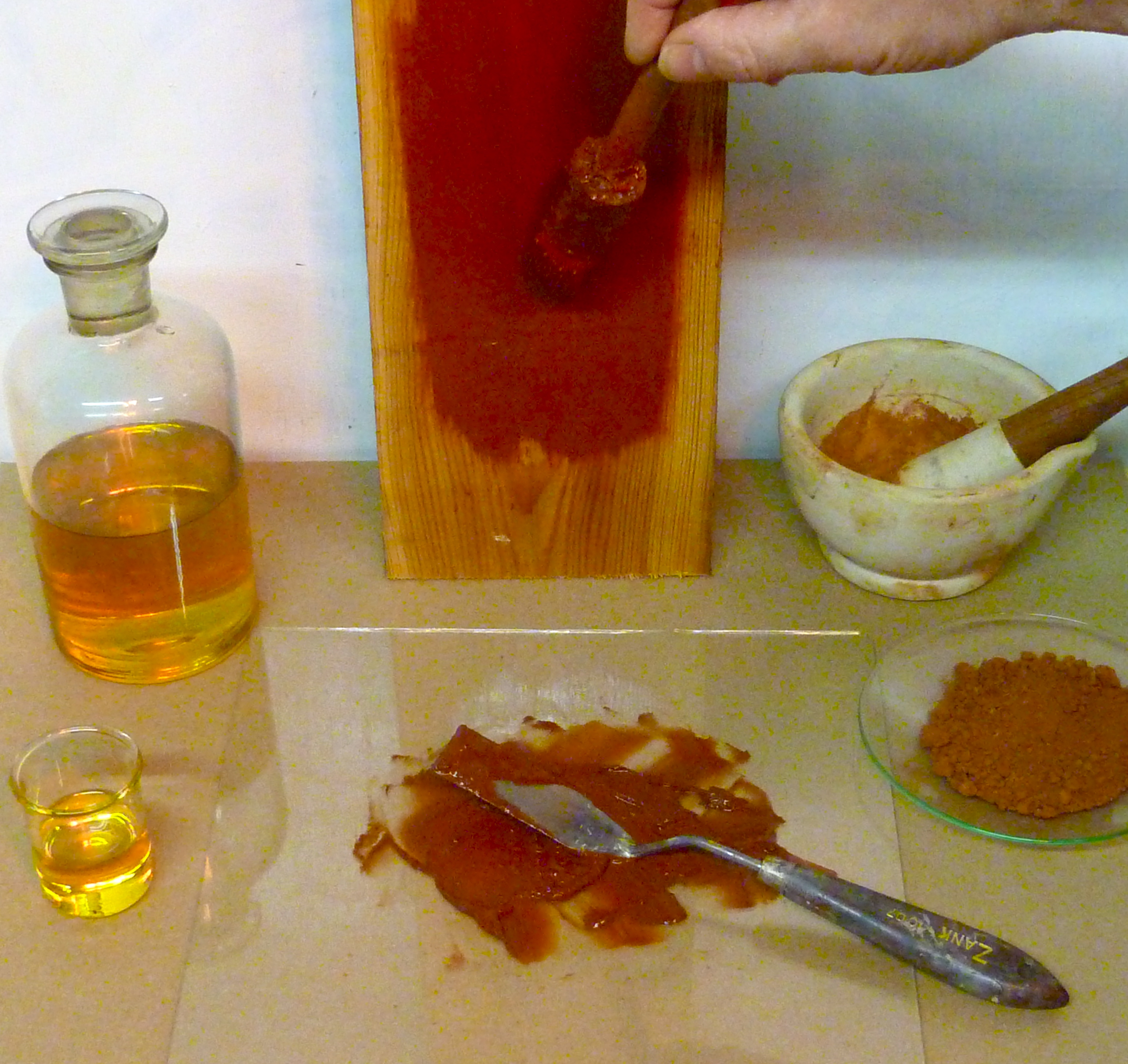
Linseed oil and paint pigments mixing together to form oil paint
