= Adelaide Deming =

American painter (1864–1956)

Adelaide Deming (December 12, 1864 – 1956) was an American painter, associated for much of her life with Litchfield, Connecticut. She was the 1908 winner of the Beal Prize for her watercolor Moon Shadows.

== Biography ==
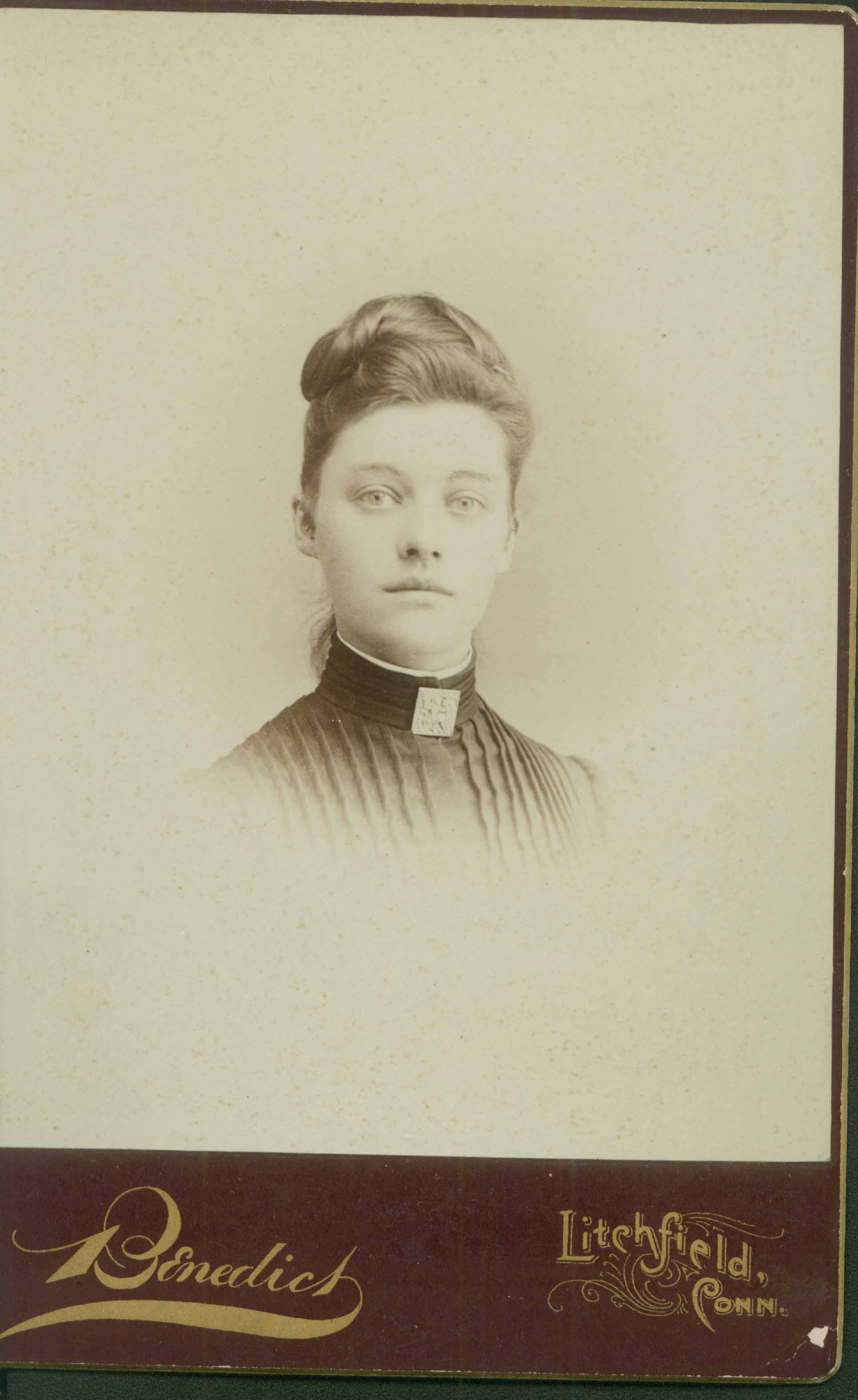
Adelaide Deming

Born on December 12, 1864, in Litchfield, Connecticut, Deming was descended from a family with deep roots in the community. She received much of her training in New York City, studying at the Art Students League of New York; her teachers included William Merritt Chase, William Lathrop, Henry B. Snow, and Arthur Wesley Dow. She taught at the Pratt Institute for eight years. Deming resigned in 1910 along with other instructors when her department head, Edith Greer, was not reinstated.

She was a member of the National Association of Women Painters and Sculptors and the American Watercolor Society. She was president of the local suffrage group, the Litchfield Equal Franchise League. She also served on the town board of education, in which role she helped to bring hot lunches to schools and to build a new school in the 1920s. In 1918, she was one of 50 Connecticut women to meet with Senator George P. McLean about women's suffrage.

Several of her paintings are owned by the Litchfield Historical Society, many of which were donated to the Society by the artist herself. The society also possesses her papers, including brief correspondence with Booker T. Washington and a request to Victor Hugo's secretary requesting an autographed photo. When the Archives of American Art was established in 1954, for the purpose of acquiring materials to promote scholarship on American artists, Deming's papers were selected as part of the collection. The Smithsonian photocopied the archival records and returned the originals to Litchfield.

== Work ==
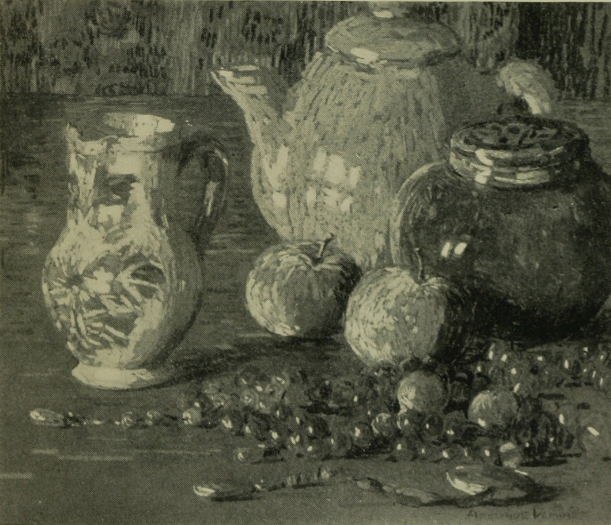
Black and white reproduction of Pottery and Jade by Adelaide Deming

Deming's work included landscapes, such as those exhibited at Pratt Institute in 1901, where the Brooklyn Daily Eagle wrote "attracted the attention of visitors." Her landscapes were considered impressionist in nature and "bucolic," and part of the Colonial Revival period in the United States, according to Briann Greenfield, a professor of history at Central Connecticut State University. The Los Angeles Herald wrote that her award-winning watercolor painting Moon Shadows was "full of the charm and mystery of moonlight." Minna C. Smith wrote in The International Studio that Moonlight Shadows depicted a scene that was "alive with poetry, its own, yes, but also interpreted by the artist." Special mention of her work, "A Quiet Harbor," on show at the Woman's Art Club of New York in 1905 was made by Charles Henry Hart in the Collector and Art Critic. Her painting of an Adirondack landscape was noted by American Art News at the Woman's Art Club of New York exhibitions in 1907, 1909, and 1910. In 1915, American Art News wrote that she "excels in the choice of picturesque subjects, which she renders with truth and simplicity."

She traveled widely in Europe, the Caribbean, and Egypt, but her best-known works were her New England landscapes, frequently depicting scenes from her hometown. She was the first woman to earn the William R. Beal award at the New York Water Color Club award in 1908 with her painting Moon Shadows. In 1915 she exhibited a group of paintings alongside pieces by Alice Schille, Helen Watson Phelps and Emma Lampert Cooper; during her career she also showed at the National Academy of Design, the Pennsylvania Academy of Fine Arts, and the Brooklyn Museum, and she participated in the Panama Pacific Exposition in 1915. Her watercolors won prizes in numerous exhibitions. She was also active as a muralist. She showed with other Connecticut artists, such as Emily Vanderpoel and Alexander Theobald Van Laer, and held memberships in a number of the state's art groups, including the Connecticut Academy of Fine Arts, the Paint and Clay Club of New Haven, and the Kent Art Association.
