= Alice Schille =

American painter (1869–1955)

- Born: August 21, 1869; Columbus, Ohio
- Died: November 6, 1955 (aged 86); Columbus, Ohio
- Resting place: Green Lawn Cemetery
- Education: William Merritt Chase
- Alma mater: Columbus Art School; Art Students League of New York
- Known for: painting
- Style: Post Impressionism

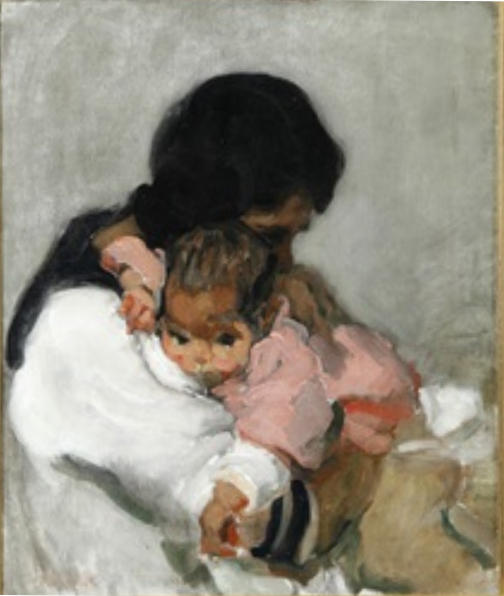
Puerto Rican Mother and Child, Alice Schille

Alice Schille (1869–1955) was an American watercolorist and painter from Columbus, Ohio. She was renowned for her Impressionist and Post Impressionist paintings, which usually depicted scenes featuring markets, women, children, and landscapes. Her ability to capture the character of her subjects and landscapes often resulted in her winning the top prize in art competitions. She was also known for her versatility in painting styles; her influences included the “Dutch Old Masters, James McNeill Whistler, the Fauves, and Mexican muralists.” Her estate is represented by Keny Galleries in Columbus, OH.

== Biography ==
Schille was born to wealth on August 21, 1869, to father Peter Schille and mother Sophia Green. She traveled to multiple continents, including North and South America, Europe, and Africa, to develop her painting techniques. Her travels between multiple countries encouraged her to develop her complex and versatile art style; the amalgam of her travels reflected an "[null unusual courage and strength of will]" in her paintings.

She attended the Columbus Art School beginning in 1891, and studied at the Art Students League of New York on a scholarship under American painter William Merritt Chase. There she studied figure drawing with American artist Kenyon Cox. In 1894 she went to Europe and remained there until 1900, in 1903 studying at the Académie Colarossi in Paris, later traveling extensively in the United States, Morocco, Egypt and abroad. For years she taught at the Columbus Art School, retiring in 1948.

Alice Schille won the gold medal at the 1915 annual watercolor exhibition at the Pennsylvania Academy of the Fine Arts, along with many other honors throughout her lifetime. That same year she showed paintings in New York alongside works by Helen Watson Phelps, Adelaide Deming and Emma Lampert Cooper. Scholar James Keny notes in his excerpt on Schille in The American Midwest: An Interpretive Encyclopedia, that in 1909 "Schille exhibited some of the first examples of Pointillism by an American artist at the Pennsylvania Academy of [sic] Fine Arts."

Schille visited Santa Fe, New Mexico for the first time in the summer of 1919, returning the following summer and returning again in 1926. She continued to visit sporadically into the 1930s. In 1920 she hosted a one-woman exhibition of fifteen watercolor paintings at the New Mexico Museum of Art. Later that year, she exhibited at the same museum's annual Fiesta show. Today, her work can be found in the permanent art collections of the Canton Museum of Art, Columbus Museum of Art, El Paso Museum of Art, Indianapolis Museum of Art, Ohio State University, Pennsylvania Academy of Fine Arts, Art Club of Philadelphia and the Fine Arts Museums of San Francisco. Her story was told in a documentary called Cactus Tree, which was produced in 2021.

Schille lost her father when she was 17; her mother lived to the age of 101 years. Schille is buried in Green Lawn Cemetery, Columbus, Ohio.

Asked how to say her name, she told The Literary Digest it was SHILL-ay.
