= Helen Watson Phelps =

American painter (1864–1944)

- Born: 1864; Attleboro, Massachusetts, U.S.
- Died: 1944 (aged 79–80); New York City, New York, U.S.
- Known for: Painting

Helen Watson Phelps (1864–1944) was an American painter.

== Biography ==
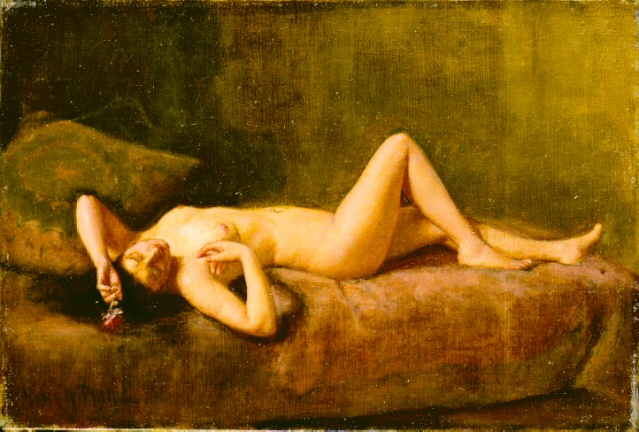
Helen Watson Phelps, "L'Abandon" in Rhode Island School of Design Museum collection

Phelps was born in Attleboro, Massachusetts in 1864.

Phelps is known to have received some training at the Académie Julian and with Raphaël Collin in Paris. While there she showed work at the Paris Salon; she also exhibited at the National Academy of Design, the Pennsylvania Academy of the Fine Arts, and the Society of American Artists during her career. She received awards for her paintings at the Pan-American Exposition in Buffalo, New York in 1901, and from the National Association of Women Painters and Sculptors in 1914, and she was represented at the 1893 World's Fair in Chicago. In 1915 she exhibited a group of paintings alongside pieces by Alice Schille, Adelaide Deming and Emma Lampert Cooper. Phelps' work was described as having European tendencies, and was well-regarded by critics.

=== Death and legacy ===
Phelps died in New York City in 1944. A pair of portraits by Phelps are held by the Rhode Island School of Design. Her portrait of Charlotte Buell Coman is in the collection of the National Academy.
