= Colin Campbell Cooper =

American painter (1856–1937)

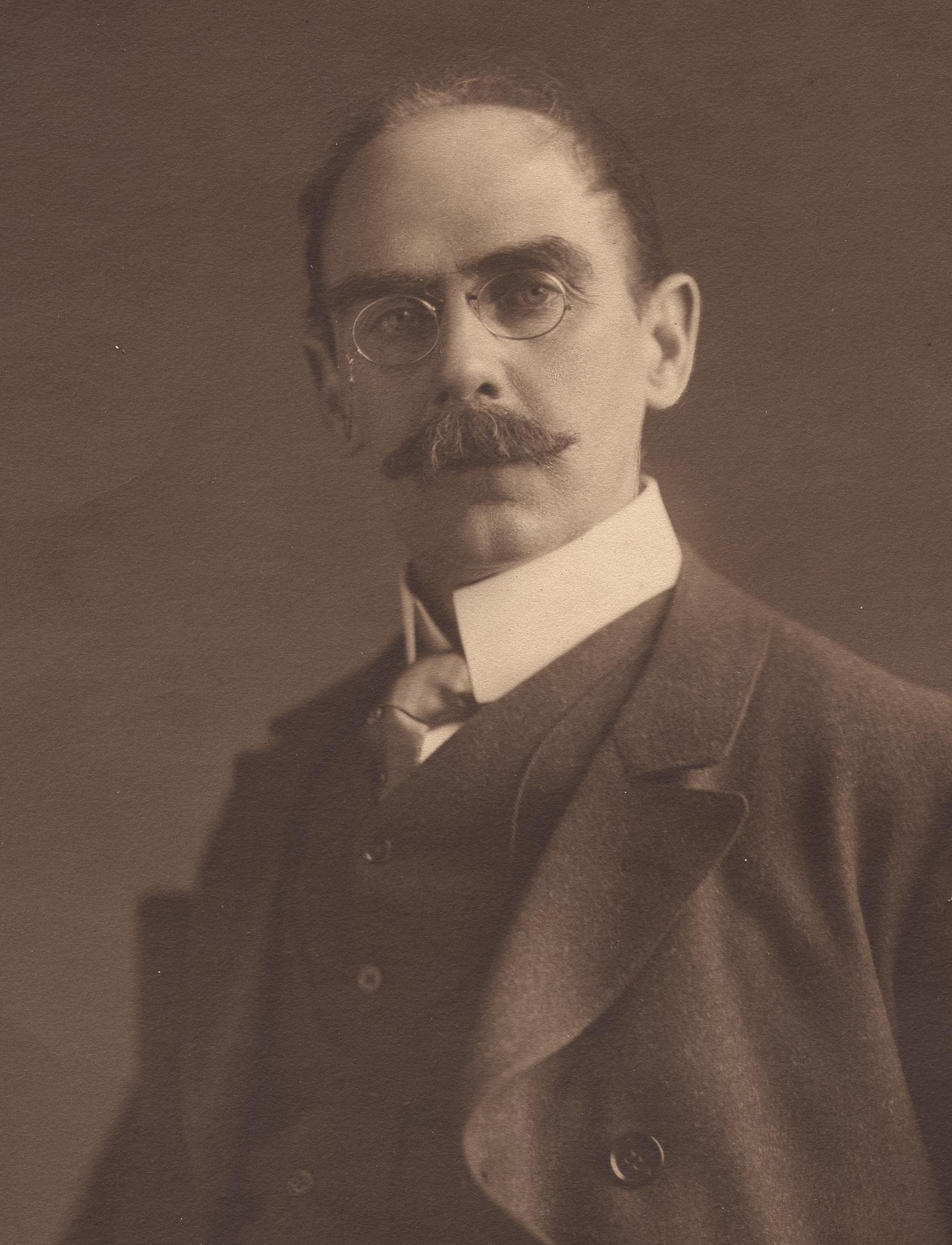
- Colin Campbell Cooper, c. 1905
- Born: March 8, 1856; Philadelphia, Pennsylvania, U.S.
- Died: November 6, 1937 (aged 81); Santa Barbara, California, U.S.
- Resting place: West Laurel Hill Cemetery, Bala Cynwyd, Pennsylvania, U.S.
- Education: Pennsylvania Academy of the Fine Arts (Thomas Eakins), Académie Julian
- Known for: Painting (oil, watercolor)
- Movement: American Impressionism

Colin Campbell Cooper, Jr. (March 8, 1856 – November 6, 1937) was an American impressionist painter of architectural paintings, especially of skyscrapers in New York City, Philadelphia, and Chicago. An avid traveler, he created many paintings of European and Asian landmarks, as well as natural landscapes, portraits, florals, and interiors.

He studied painting at the Pennsylvania Academy of the Fine Arts under Thomas Eakins and at the Académie Julian, the Académie Delécluse and the Académie Vitti. He was elected a member of the National Academy of Design in 1912 and won the gold medal for oil painting and silver medal for watercolor painting at the Panama-Pacific International Exposition in 1915. He taught art at Drexel University and served as Dean of painting at the Santa Barbara Community School of Arts. In the 1920s, he turned to writing and wrote plays and his autobiography In These Old Days. He initiated the efforts to create the Santa Barbara Museum of Art. His first wife, Emma Lampert Cooper, was also a painter.

== Early life and education ==
Cooper was born in Philadelphia, Pennsylvania, on March 8, 1856, into a well-to-do family of English-Irish heritage. He had four older and four younger siblings. His mother, Emily Williams Cooper, whose ancestor emigrated to the U.S. from Weymouth, England, was an amateur painter in watercolors. His father, Dr. Colin Campbell Cooper, whose grandfather came from Derry, Ireland, was a surgeon and a lawyer with a great appreciation for the arts. Young Colin had been inspired by the art which he discovered when he attended the Philadelphia Exposition of 1876. Both of his parents were highly supportive of his ambitions and encouraged him to become an artist.

In 1879, Cooper enrolled in the Pennsylvania Academy of the Fine Arts in Philadelphia and studied art under Thomas Eakins for three years. In 1886, he traveled to the Netherlands, Belgium, and Brittany. Afterwards, his art education resumed at the Académie Julian in Paris from 1886 to 1890, with Henri Lucien Doucet, William-Adolphe Bouguereau, and Jules Joseph Lefebvre. He also studied at Académie Delécluse and Académie Vitti. His work of this period consisted mostly of landscapes painted in a Barbizon manner. He traveled extensively throughout his life, sketching and painting scenes of Europe, Asia, and the United States in watercolors and oils.

== Career ==
=== Philadelphia and New York City ===
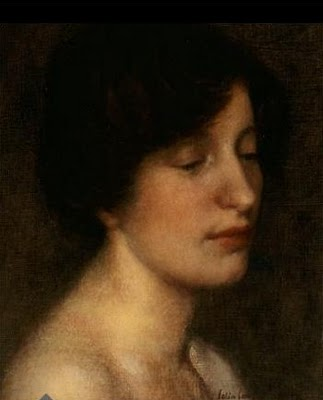
Portrait of Emma Lampert Cooper by Cooper, c. 1897

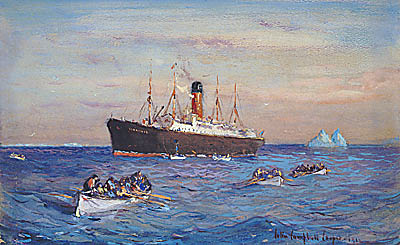
Rescue of the Survivors of the Titanic by the Carpathia, 1912

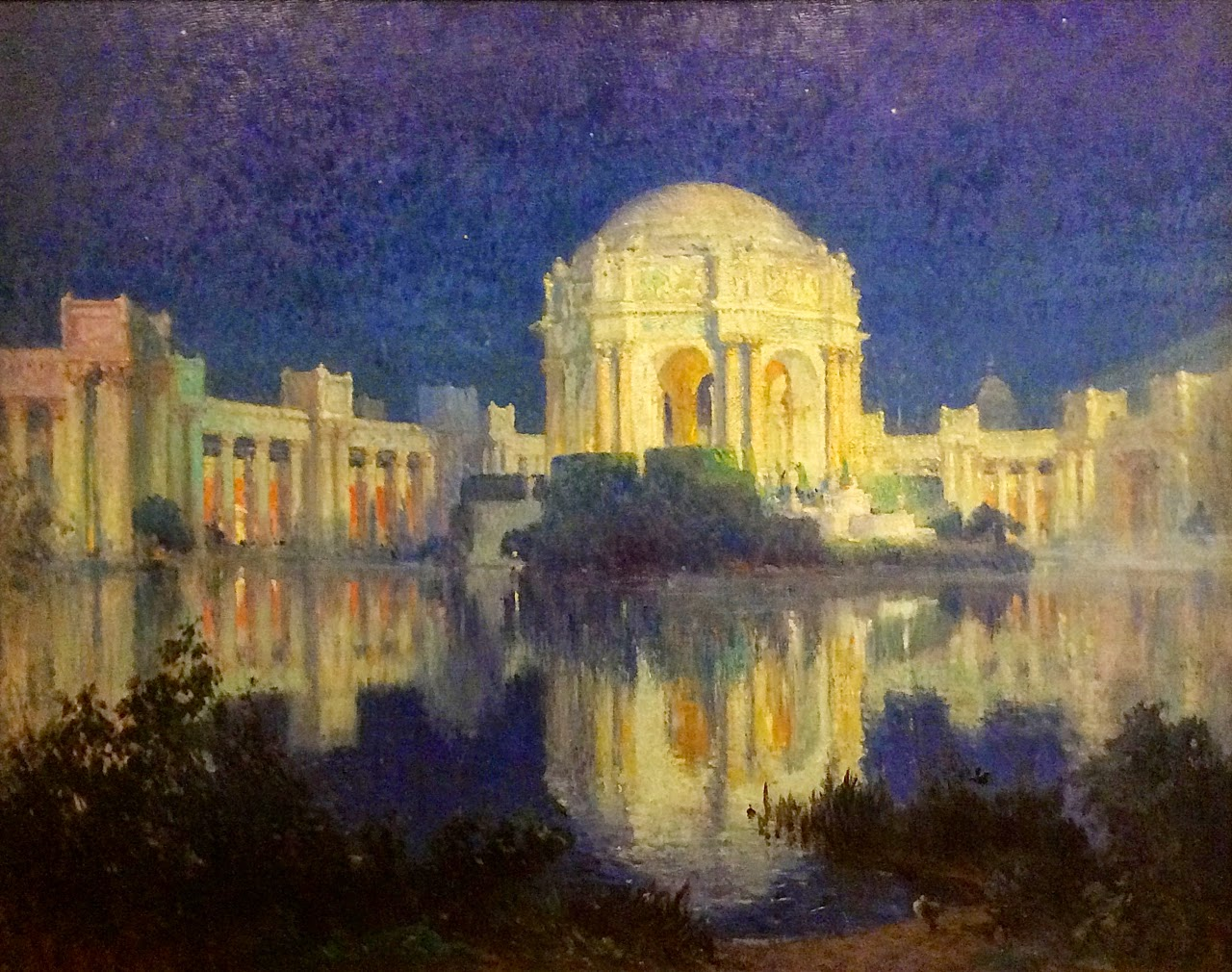
Palace of Fine Arts, San Francisco, c. 1915, now housed at the Crocker Art Museum in Sacramento, California

Back in Philadelphia, Cooper taught watercolor classes and architectural rendering at Drexel Institute of Art, Science and Industry (now Drexel University) from 1895 to 1898. Many of Cooper's paintings were destroyed in an 1896 fire at Philadelphia's Hazeltine Galleries; as a result, relatively little of his early work exists today.

While at Drexel, he spent his summers abroad, primarily in the Dutch artists colony of Laren in North Holland and in Dordrecht in South Holland. Among the other artists in Dordrecht at this time was renowned painter Emma Lampert (1855–1920) from Rochester, New York. She and Cooper met, and were soon married, in Rochester on June 9, 1897.

In 1898, the Coopers returned to Europe for a few years. During this period, as Cooper painted architectural landmarks, he developed the Impressionist style which he used for the rest of his artistic career.

Cooper and his wife exhibited together in several two-person shows, including a May 1902 exhibit at the Philadelphia Art Club and a 1915 show at the Memorial Art Gallery in Rochester. They moved in 1904 to New York City, where he would remain, other than his many travels, until 1921. Here he continued work, which he had begun about two years earlier in Philadelphia, on his famous skyscraper paintings. Cooper said that he was "greatly interested in the skyscraper buildings in Broad Street. It was intensely interesting to watch the freakishness disappear from those queer towering structures in the glory of the right kind of light". He said that the painting which first brought him great success was 1902's Broad Street, New York; in 1903, this painting was honored with the W. T. Evans Award of the New York Watercolor Club. In another interview, he had stated that "one of the points that most strikes me about this view up Broad Street is the dramatic contrast between the old, low type of buildings ... and the great skyscrapers. My pictures are built on these contrasts."

In 1911, The New York Times, citing Cooper as the artist who best captured modern, towering structures on canvas, declared him to be "the skyscraper artist par excellence of America". In an article the following year, they stated that he was "one of the most interesting figures in American art", reiterating that "in his particular field he has no superior". In addition to New York City, his paintings often depict skyscrapers in Philadelphia and Chicago.

Cooper's painting Fifth Avenue, New York was purchased by the French government for the Musée du Luxembourg. Such an honor was quite rare for an American artist. Critics at the time, and up to the present, frequently compared the works of Cooper and Childe Hassam. They have often been credited as being the two most iconic artists whose paintings began a trend of celebrating the wonders of the modern city, especially New York City. Cooper may have intentionally avoided certain subjects in order to differentiate himself from Hassam. Hassam, unlike Cooper, did not concentrate on the tall buildings in his cityscapes.

Cooper was as proficient painting in watercolors as he was in oils. He would often create a small watercolor study before painting a larger work of the same subject in oils. But the smaller watercolors were not mere sketches for his own use; they were finished pieces which he exhibited, sometimes years earlier than the larger corresponding oil paintings that he would ultimately produce. Cooper was elected to a prestigious membership in the National Academy of Design in 1912 (he had previously been elected an Associate, four years earlier).

He and his wife were aboard the RMS Carpathia during its rescue mission for the survivors from the sunken RMS Titanic on April 15, 1912. He assisted in the effort, and during the rescue operation, he created several paintings which document the events. The Coopers gave up their ship's cabin so some of the survivors would have berths to sleep in.

Cooper exhibited in San Francisco's Panama–Pacific International Exposition of 1915, winning the gold medal for oil and the silver medal for watercolor. While there, he created a series of paintings depicting the exposition's buildings, including the Palace of Fine Arts. He also participated in the Panama–California Exposition in San Diego in 1916. The Coopers spent the winter of 1915–16 in Los Angeles. This time in southern California was undoubtedly a key factor in Cooper's later decision to move there permanently. His wife Emma died of tuberculosis on July 30, 1920.

=== Santa Barbara ===
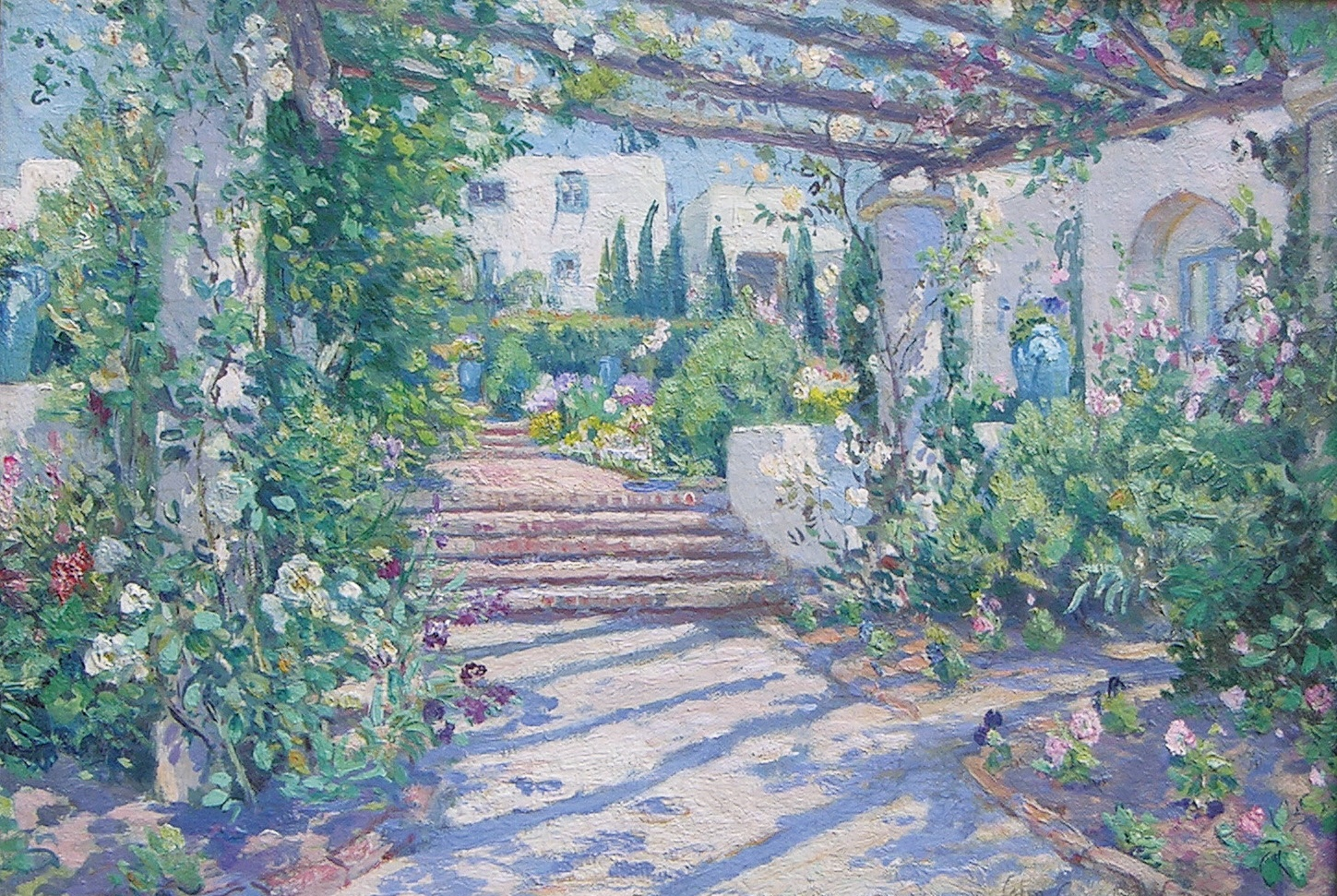
Terrace at Samarkand Hotel, c. 1923

After his wife's death, Cooper moved to Santa Barbara, California, in January 1921, where he resided for the rest of his life. He spent two years in northern Europe and Tunisia and became Dean of Painting at the Santa Barbara Community School of Arts.

Cooper said of his new environment: "I find Santa Barbara so conducive to the sort of things a painter most craves – climate, flowers, mountains, seascapes, etc. – with a community interest in all sorts of artistic matters that I am compensated, to a degree, for the isolation from that artistic universe of America. But he hadn't abandoned that "artistic universe of America", New York City, as he continued to maintain a studio there for ten years after his move to California.

Another aspect of his creativity became evident starting in the mid-1920s, as, perhaps influenced by his father's love of literature, he began writing plays and books. His plays found their way in the 1920s and 1930 to theater companies in places such as Pasadena, Redlands, and Santa Fe, and were also produced at a theater which he founded in Santa Barbara, called The Strollers. In addition to the plays, he also wrote novels, illustrated books, and an autobiography entitled In These Old Days.

In April 1927, he married his second wife, Marie Henriette Frehsee, in Arizona. Cooper continued to enjoy traveling, and kept painting until prevented from doing so by failing eyesight in his last years. He died in Santa Barbara on November 6, 1937, at the age of 81. He was interred at West Laurel Hill Cemetery in Bala Cynwyd, Pennsylvania.

== Legacy ==
In 1938 Santa Barbara's Faulkner Memorial Art Gallery paid tribute to Cooper's legacy by presenting a memorial exhibition of his work.

Several months before his death, Cooper initiated the effort to convert the abandoned post office building into an art museum in a letter to the editor of the Santa Barbara News-Press in July 1937. Four years later that effort materialized into the Santa Barbara Museum of Art.

== Exhibitions ==
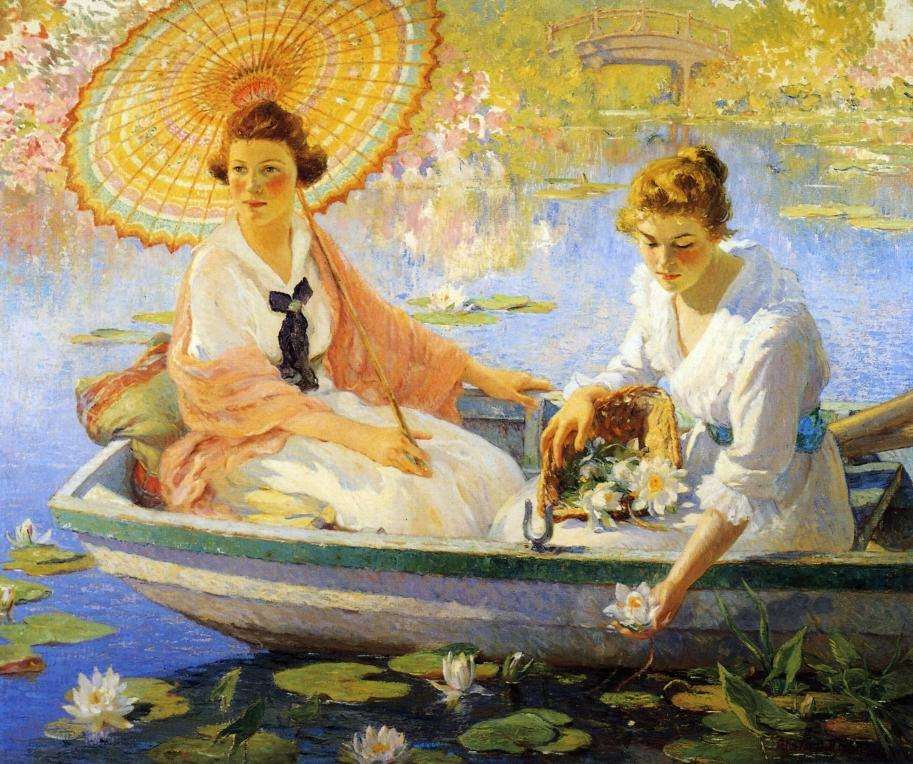
Summer, 1918

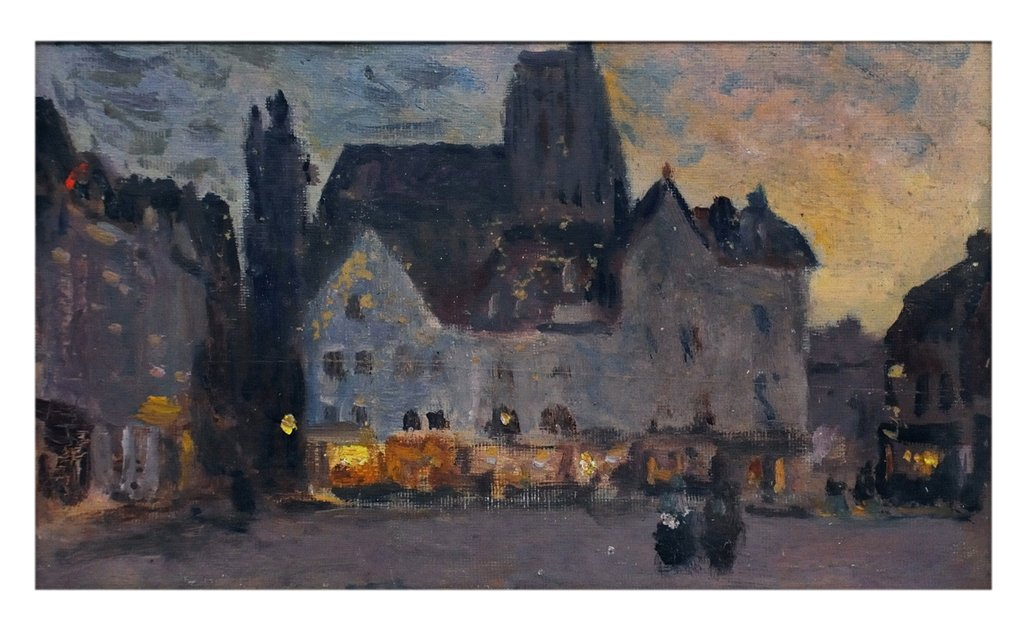
Nocturnal Town Square a.k.a. European Plaza. Oil on board. James Hansen Santa Barbara, California exhibition, 1981. Private collection, USA.

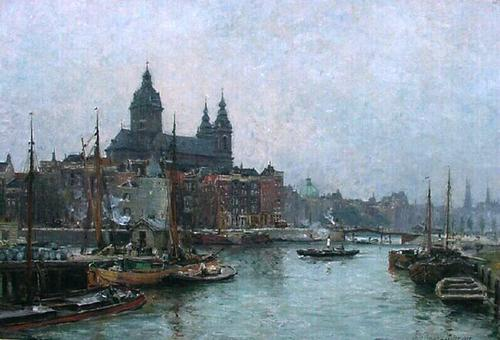
Amsterdam, 1892

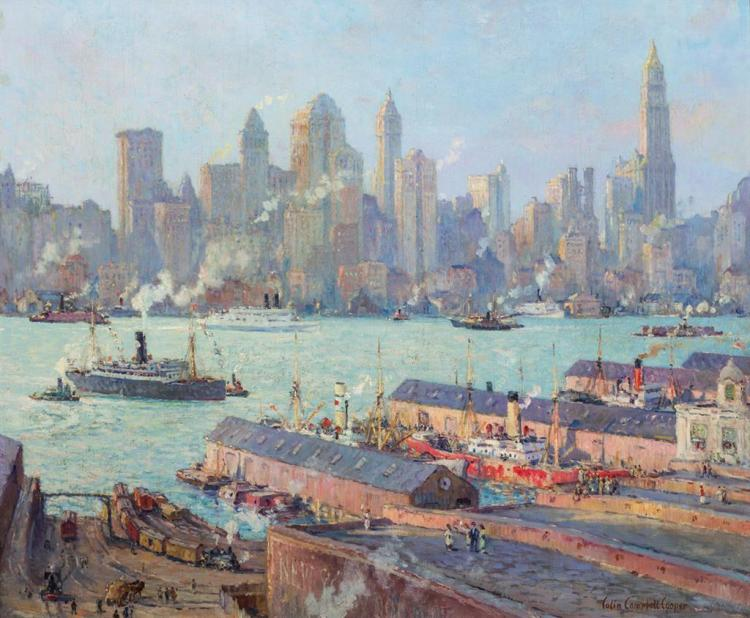
New York from Brooklyn, c. 1910

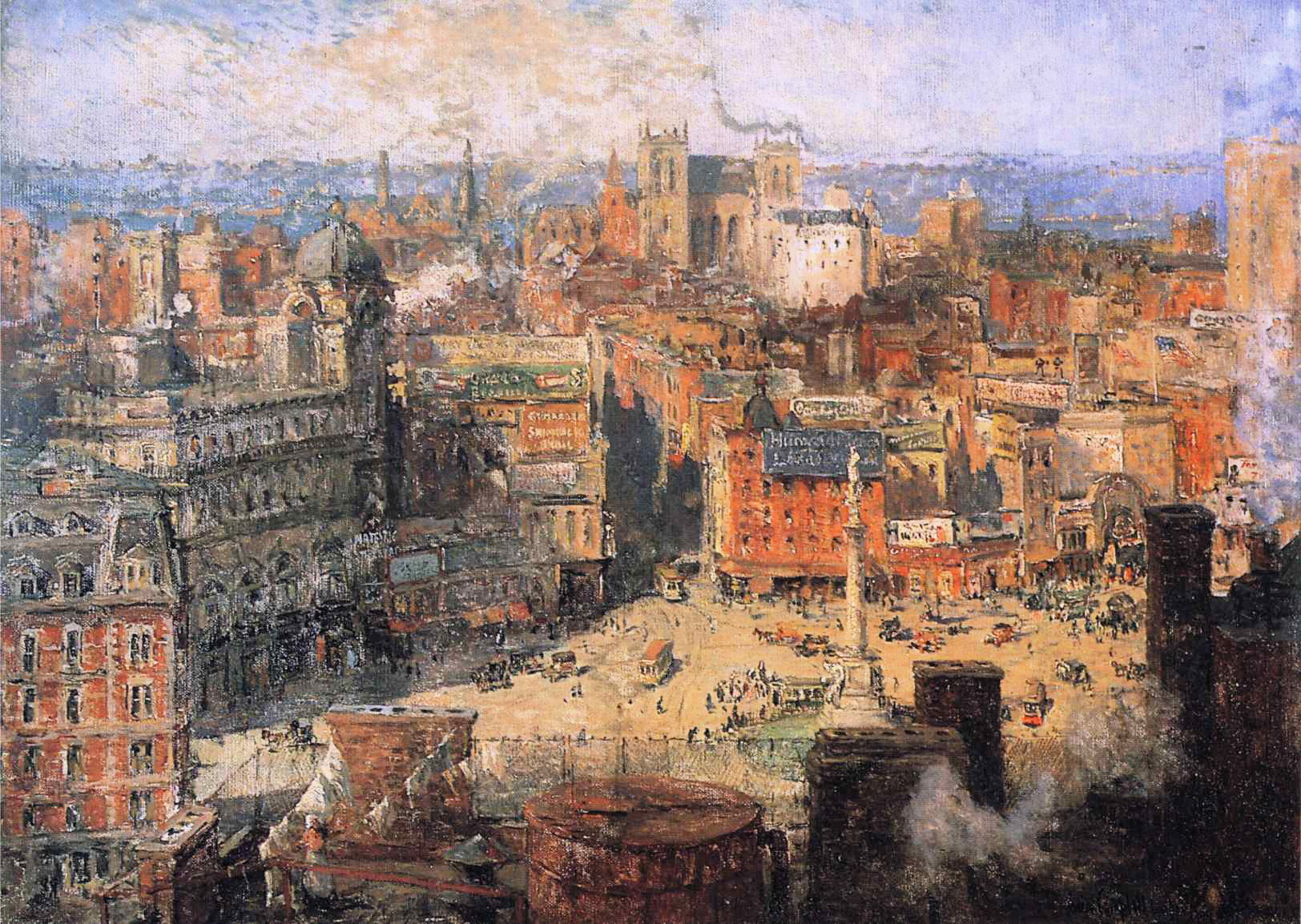
Columbus Circle, 1909

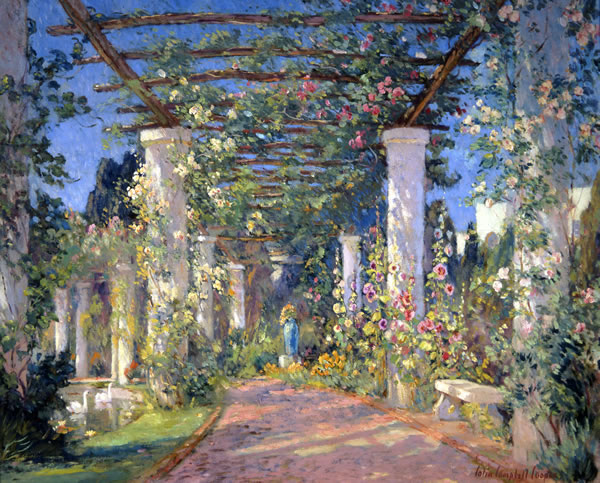
Pergola at Samarkand, c. 1921

=== Selected solo exhibitions ===
- 1924-1925 Fine Arts Gallery, San Diego Museum of Art
- 1925 Stendahl Art Galleries (Los Angeles, CA)
- 1927 Ainslie Galleries (Los Angeles, CA)
- 1927 Friday Morning Club (Los Angeles, CA)
- 1934 Faulkner Memorial Art Gallery (Santa Barbara, CA)
- 1938 Memorial Exhibition, Faulkner Memorial Art Gallery (Santa Barbara, CA)
- 1981 An Exhibition of Paintings by Colin Campbell Cooper, James M. Hansen, (Santa Barbara, CA)
- 2002 Colin Campbell Cooper: Impressions of New York, Santa Barbara Museum of Art
- 2003: Sullivan Goss Gallery (Santa Barbara, CA)
- 2006 East Coast/West Coast and Beyond: Colin Campbell Cooper, American Impressionist, retrospective; originated at Heckscher Museum of Art (Huntington, New York), traveled to Laguna Art Museum (Laguna Beach, CA) in 2007.
- 2010 Santa Barbara Historical Museum (Santa Barbara, CA)
- 2018 "Landmark", Sullivan Goss - An American Gallery (Santa Barbara, CA)

=== Selected group exhibitions ===
- 1895, 1897, 1899, 1901–16, 1919, 1920 Art Institute of Chicago
- 1901–03, 1907, 1908, 1912 Carnegie Institute Museum of Art (Pittsburgh)
- 1902 Galleries of the ART Club (New York)
- 1903 Klackner Galleries (New York)
- 1907, 1909, 1911, 1913, 1915, 1917, 1920 Corcoran Gallery of Art (Washington, D.C.)
- 1907–10, 1912, 1913, 1915, 1919, 1922 City Art Museum of St. Louis
- 1912 The Macdowell Club of New York
- 1915 Arlington Art Galleries (New York)
- 1915 Macbeth Gallery (New York)
- 1916 O'Brien Gallery (Chicago)
- 1916 Cleveland Museum of Art
- 1924 Casa de la Guerra (Santa Barbara)
- 1927 Biltmore Galleries (Santa Barbara)
- 1929 Jules Kievits Fine Art (Pasadena)
- 1930 Art Club of Philadelphia
- 1930, 1931 New York Society of Painters
- 1930, 1931, 1941 County National Bank and Trust (Santa Barbara)
- 1932 National Arts Club (New York)
- 1933 Ebell Salon of Art (Los Angeles)
- 1939, 1941, 1944, 1951 Santa Barbara Museum of Art

Source for exhibition information, except where otherwise noted:

== Collections ==
Cooper's work is in many prominent collections, including:

- Allentown Art Museum (Allentown, Pennsylvania)
- Berman Museum of Art, Ursinus College (Collegeville, Pennsylvania)
- Brooklyn Museum of Art
- Cincinnati Museum of Art
- Crocker Art Museum (Sacramento, California)
- Dallas Museum of Art
- Fleischer Museum (Scottsdale, Arizona)
- Irvine Museum (Irvine, California)
- Jersey City Museum (Jersey City, New Jersey)
- Lowe Art Museum, (Coral Gables, Florida)
- Memorial Art Gallery (Rochester, New York)
- Metropolitan Museum of Art (New York City)
- Montclair Art Museum (Montclair, New Jersey)
- Musée du Luxembourg (Paris, France)
- Musée National de la Cooperation Franco-Americaine (Blerancourt, France)
- Museum of the National Academy of Design (New York City)
- National Arts Club (New York City)
- National Museum of American History, Smithsonian Institution (Washington, D.C.)
- National Museum of Wildlife Art (Jackson Hole, Wyoming)
- New Britain Museum of American Art (New Britain, Connecticut)
- New York Historical Society
- Norton Museum of Art (West Palm Beach, Florida)
- Oakland Museum of California (Oakland, California)
- Palais de Tokyo (Ancien National D'art Moderne) (Paris, France)
- Payne Gallery, Moravian College (Bethlehem, Pennsylvania)
- Pennsylvania Academy of the Fine Arts
- Philadelphia Museum of Art
- Reading Public Museum (Reading, Pennsylvania)
- Saint Louis Museum of Fine Arts
- San Antonio Art League Museum
- San Diego Museum of Art
- Santa Barbara Museum of Art
- Sewell C. Biggs Museum of American Art (Dover, Delaware)
- University of Michigan Museum of Art (Ann Arbor, Michigan)
- Westmoreland Museum of American Art (Greensburg, Pennsylvania)
- The White House (Washington, D.C.)

== Gallery ==
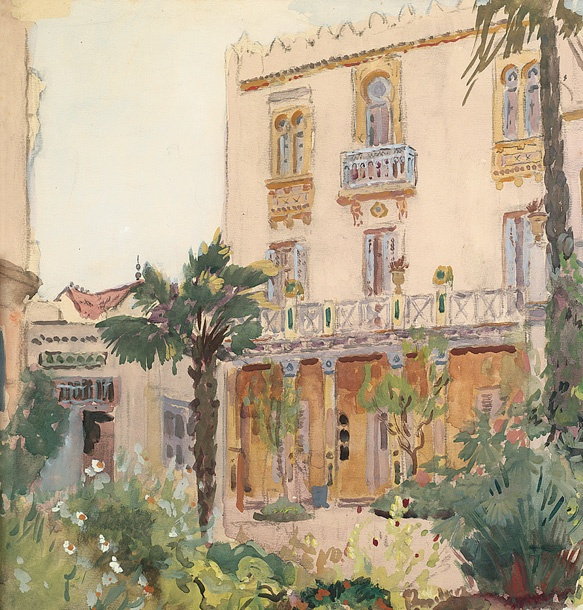
Spanish Garden, c. 1890s–1910s

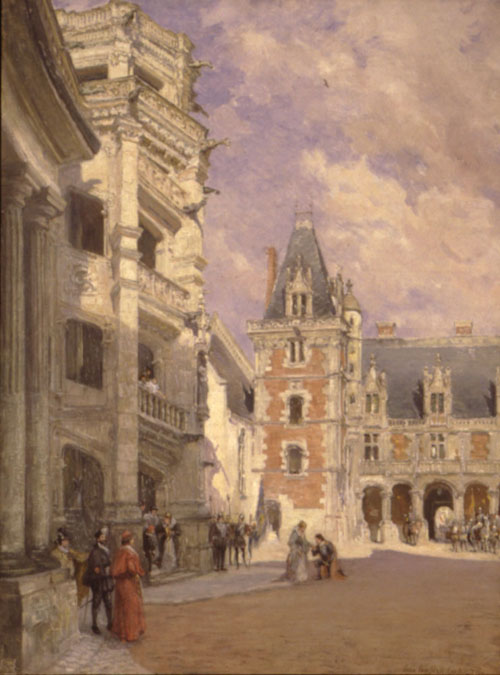
Stairway of Francis I at Blois, 1900

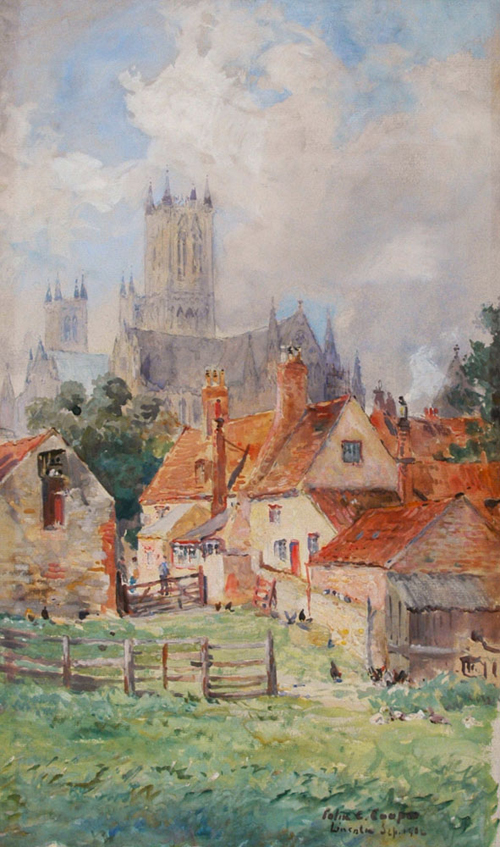
Adam and Eve Inn, Lincoln, England, 1902

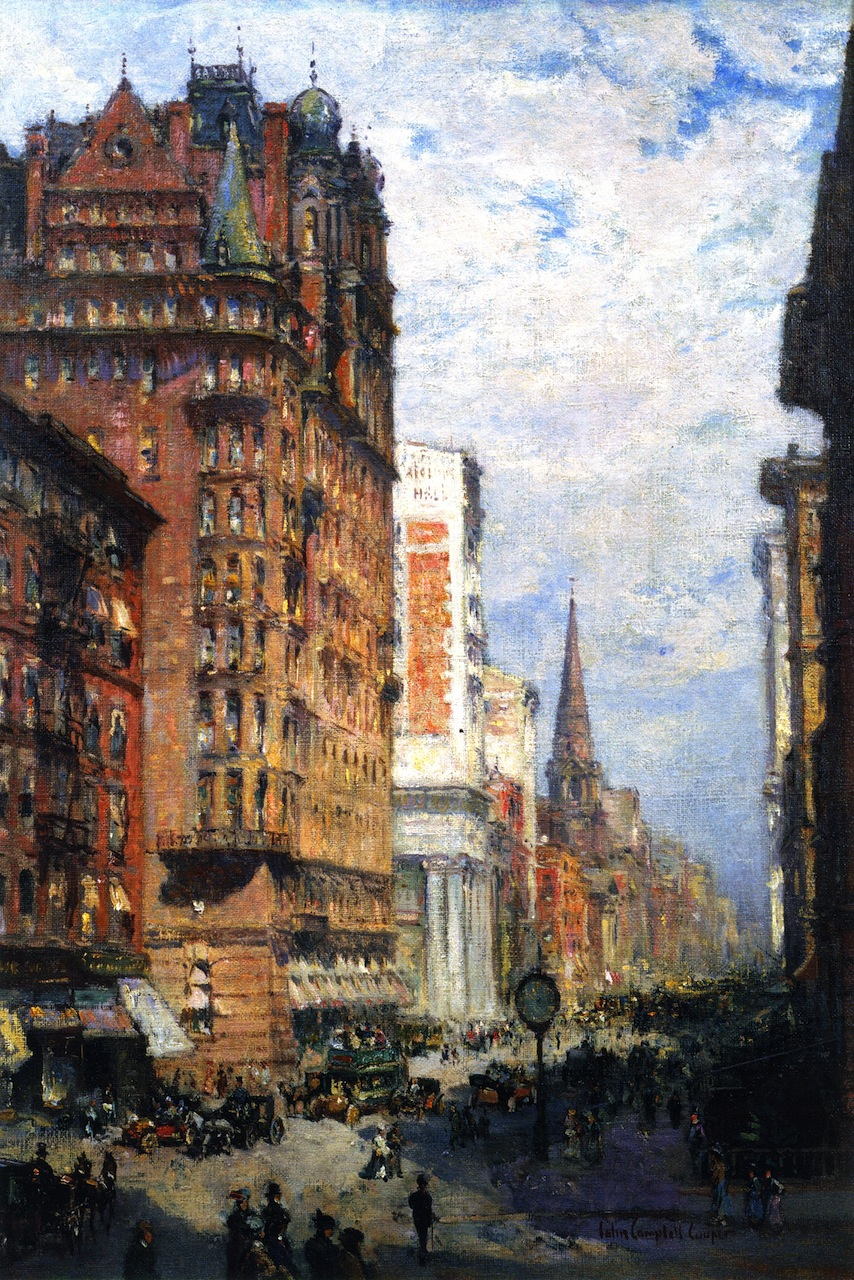
Fifth Avenue, New York City, 1906

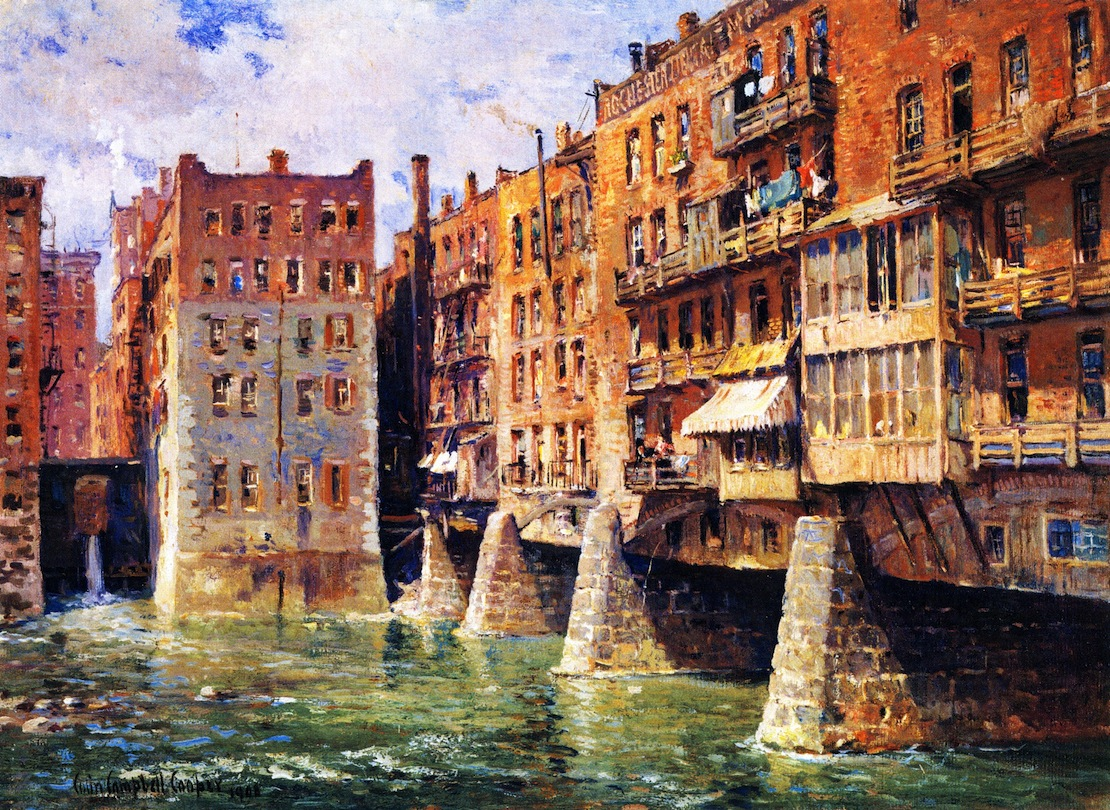
Main Street Bridge, Rochester, 1908

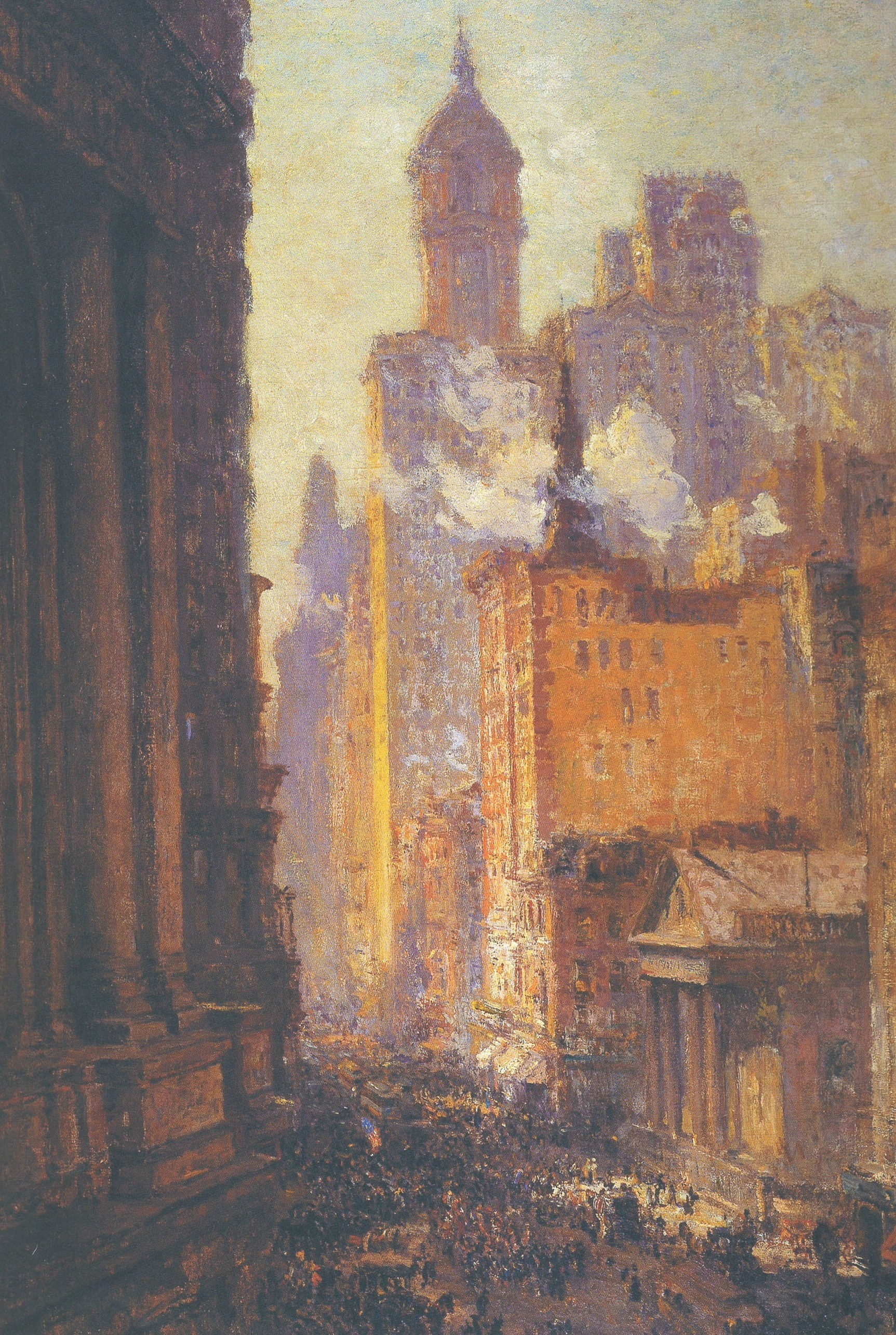
Broadway from the Post Office (Wall Street), c. 1909

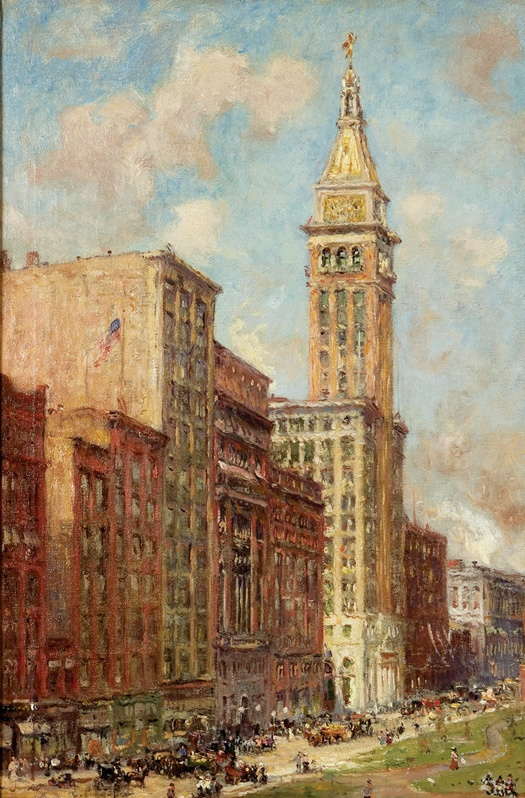
Metropolitan Life Tower, 1910

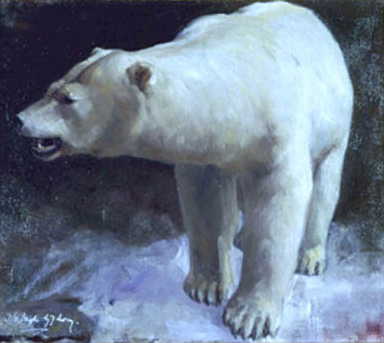
Polar Bear, 1912

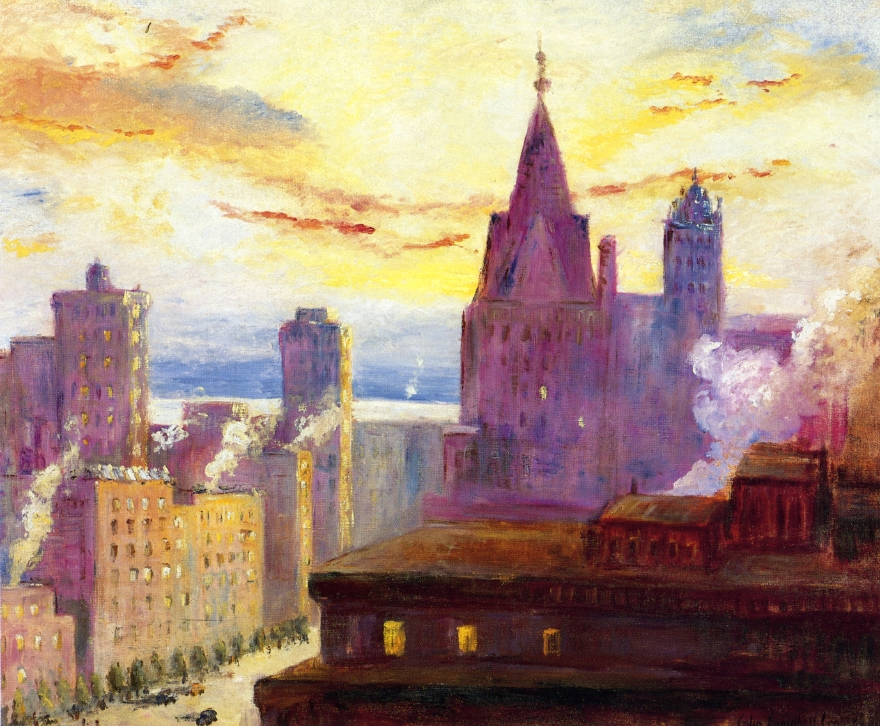
Rooftops at Sunset, 1912

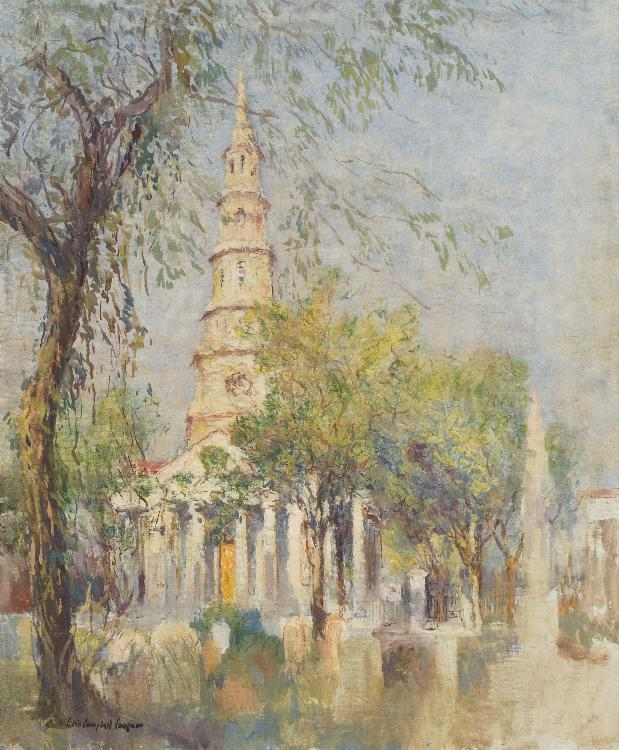
St. Philips Church, Charleston, c. 1913

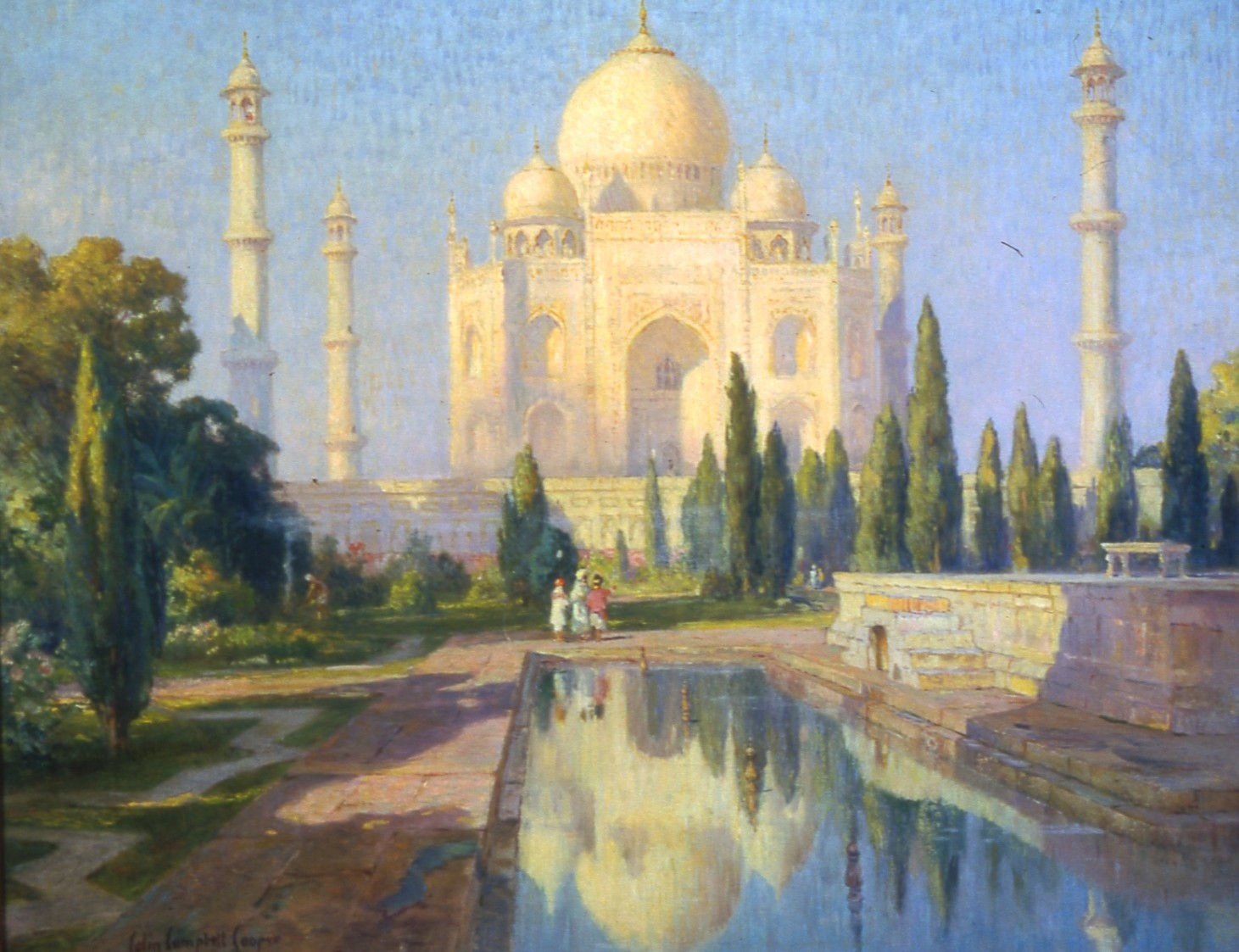
Taj Mahal, Afternoon, 1913

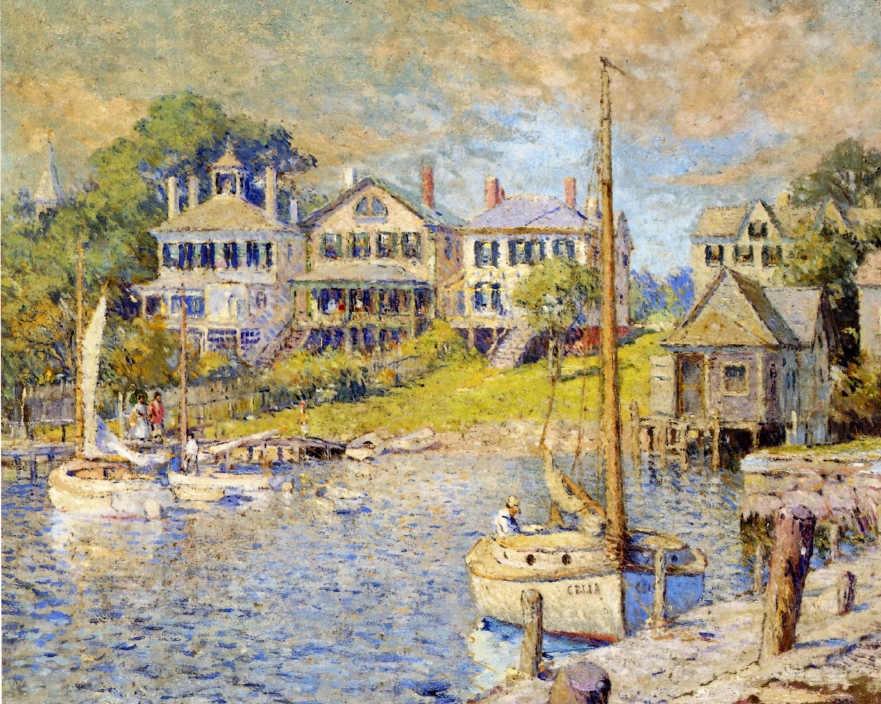
At Edgartown, Martha's Vineyard, 1915

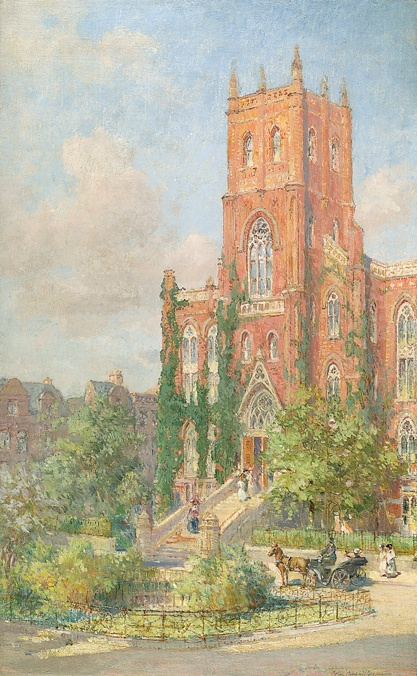
Hunter College, New York City, c. 1915

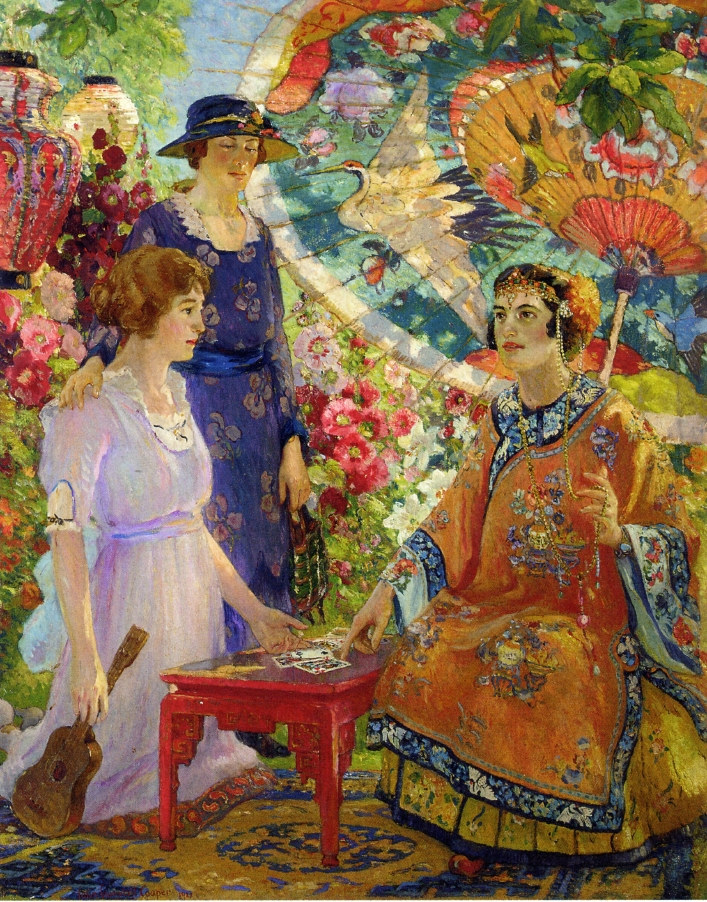
Fortune Teller, 1921

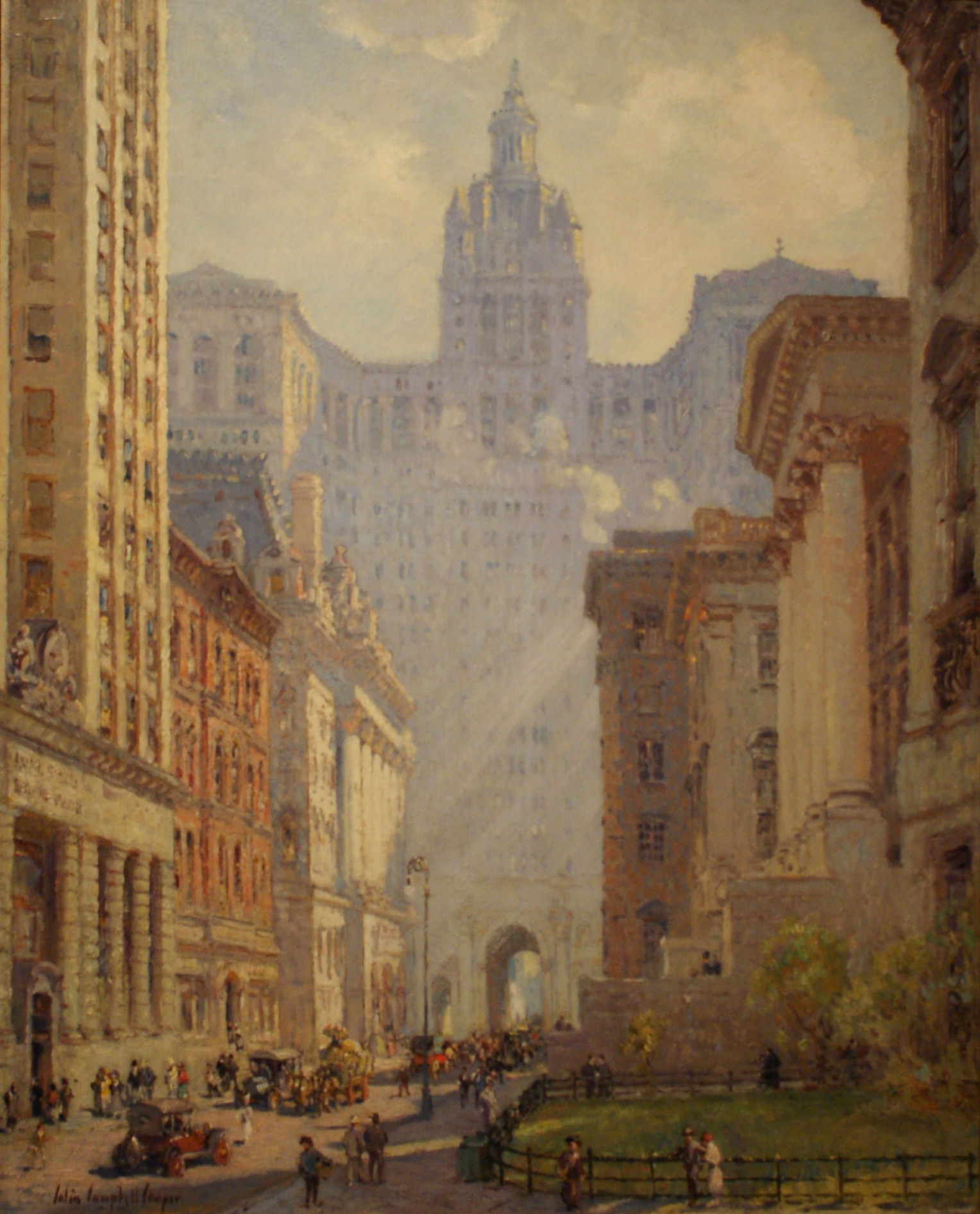
Chambers Street and the Municipal Building, N.Y.C., 1922

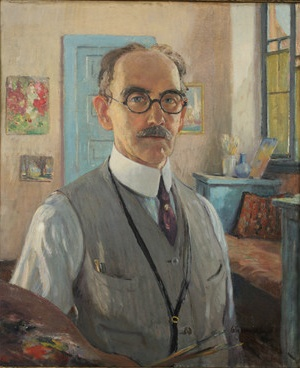
Self-Portrait, c. 1922
