= Emma Lampert Cooper =

American painter (1855–1920)

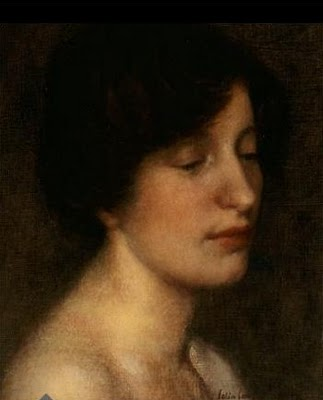
- Portrait of Emma Lampert Cooper by Colin Campbell Cooper
- Born: Emma Esther Lampert; February 24, 1855; Nunda, NY
- Died: June 30, 1920 (aged 65); Pittsford, NY
- Education: Art Students League
- Known for: Painting
- Movement: Realism
- Spouse: Colin Campbell Cooper (m. 1897)
- Awards: Chicago's World's Fair in 1893; St. Louis World's Fair of 1904 (bronze)

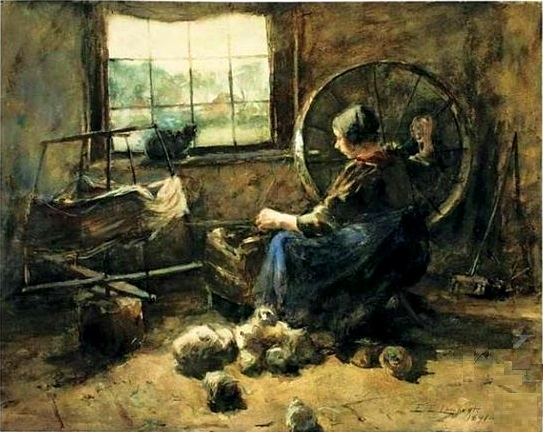
Emma Lampert Cooper, The Breadwinner, honored at the Chicago World's Exposition in 1893

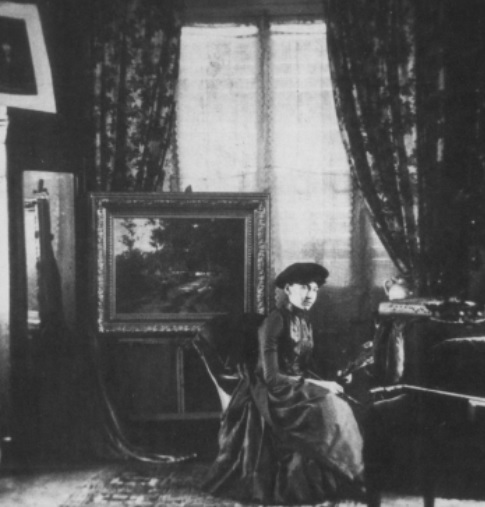
Emma Lampert Cooper, in her studio, circa 1900

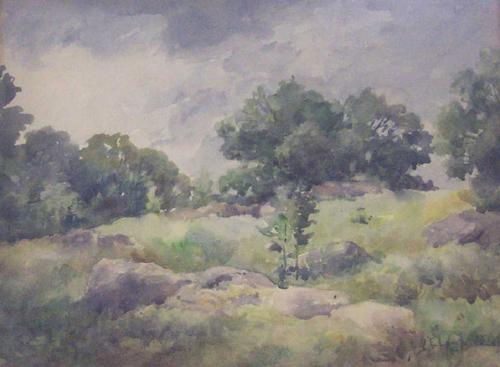
Emma Lampert Cooper water color: Spring Landscape

Emma Lampert Cooper (February 24, 1855 – July 30, 1920) was a painter from Rochester, New York, described as "a painter of exceptional ability". She studied in Rochester, New York, in New York City under William Merritt Chase, Paris at the Académie Delécluse and in the Netherlands under Hein Kever. Cooper won awards at several World's Expositions, taught art and was an art director. She met her husband, Colin Campbell Cooper in the Netherlands and the two traveled, painted and exhibited their works together.

== Early life ==
Emma Esther Lampert was born in Nunda, New York, on February 24, 1855, to Henry and Jenette (Smith) Lampert. That year her father – born in Hanover, Germany – was a tanner and two other German tanners and a servant were living in the house with the family. Emma had an older sister name Mary, younger sisters Carrie and Adella, and a younger brother named Henry. The family lived in Rochester, New York and her father was a leather wholesaler by 1870. Her father registered for the draft for the American Civil War in June 1863. He died June 10, 1880.

=== Education and early career ===
Emma graduated from Wells College in Aurora, NY, in 1875. Classes at that time were very small and college life was centered around Old Main. The students lived in pairs in Old Main. Cooper was a founding member of the eastern association of Wells College Alumni. Her classmates remember Emma as being a fine skater, who once skated across Cayuga Lake. She did it at much surprise and worry of the college staff. Following her skating episode, Emma drove across the lake with a horse and cutter. It was the first time a horse and cutter made it across the lake in Aurora.

1877 The Rochester Club was formed, and Cooper was its vice president, marking the beginning of a long relationship with the club. She held the positions of vice president, secretary, and president and was a member until 1895. From 1870 to 1886, Cooper had a studio in the historic power buildings in Rochester, NY. Within Rochester, she had a "notable influence" on the city's art community. She then returned to New York City to study at the Art Students League and Cooper Union under William Merritt Chase. Cooper studied in Paris at the Académie Delécluse for 18 months in the mid-1880s and under Hein Kever in the Netherlands in 1891.

=== Educator ===
From 1891 to 1893, Cooper taught painting and was the Art Director at the Clifton Springs, NY, foster school opened between 1876 and 1885. From 1893 to 1897, Cooper taught at the Mechanic's Institute of The Rochester Institute of Technology.

=== Marriage ===
In 1897, while working and living in Dordrecht, she met painter Colin Campbell Cooper. They married on June 9, 1897, in Rochester, New York. The couple traveled abroad between 1898 and 1902, living in the Laren artist colony in the Netherlands for one year. Then, they primarily lived in New York City, and also traveled extensively to Europe and her hometown, Rochester. They were in India in 1913, reputedly both having been commissioned by a patroness from the United States to create paintings. The works from that trip were exhibited in Rochester, New York in 1915. Because of her work in the United States and abroad, she was considered knowledgeable of the international art community.

=== Art works and exhibitions ===
Her subjects were primarily still life and landscapes from her travels. She closed her Rochester studio in 1886 and traveled to Paris. In 1887 she exhibited Hillside at Picardy at the Paris Salon. For her painting Breadwinner, Cooper was given an award at the Chicago's World's Fair in 1893 and the Cotton States and International Exposition in Atlanta in 1895. Cooper was awarded a gold medal at the 1902 American Art Society exhibition in Philadelphia. She exhibited oil and watercolor paintings at the St. Louis World's Fair of 1904 and won a bronze medal for a Weaving Homespun and another bronze medal. Her works were exhibited at the Paris Exposition of 1900. Cooper's paintings were exhibited with her husband' in shows in Rochester, Chicago, New York and Philadelphia, and Buffalo between 1902 and 1910. In 1915 she showed paintings of India alongside works by Alice Schille, Adelaide Deming and Helen Watson Phelps in New York.

A woman who followed the advice of these etiquette books to look, smell, feel, and "think" like a flower attained femininity by becoming a human flower for the aesthetic consumption of others.

— "Floral Femininity: A Pictorial Definition"

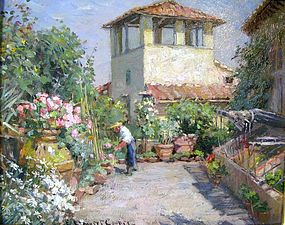
Emma Lampert Cooper, Villa Terrace, oil painting, made before 1910, Arcetri, Florence, Italy

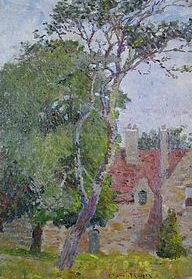
Emma Lampert Cooper, Stone House

Cooper became an artist during the 19th century when there was a significant number of women who became successful, educated artists, a rarity before that time, except for a few like Angelica Kauffman and Louise Élisabeth Vigée Le Brun (1755–1842). The emerging women artists created works with a different perspective than men, challenged the limited concepts of femininity and created a genre of floral-female landscape paintings, in which "the artist placed one woman or more in a flower garden setting and manipulated composition, color, texture and form to make the women look as much like flowers as possible." These artists were among the educated, sophisticated "New Women" beginning in the late 19th century, whose influence was largely ignored by art scholars.

Cooper was a successful landscape painter and academic figure who began as a children's book illustrator and painter of miniatures and flower paintings. Realizing the difficulty in making the transition to a successful painter, particularly of landscape and figure paintings, Cooper warned other women artists of that difficulty. She, however, was able to overcome the obstacles and become successful.

Cooper was a member of the Women's International Art Club in London, Pennsylvania Academy of Fine Arts and the Women's Art Association of Canada. In New York, she was a member of Woman's Art Club, National Arts Club, and the New York Watercolor Club. She was a charter member of the Rochester Art Club and the Philadelphia Water Color Club.

=== Collections ===
Cooper's paintings are held in private and public collections, including the Memorial Art Gallery of the University of Rochester; Strong Museum in Rochester, New York; Weatherspoon Art Museum in Greensboro, North Carolina; and Wells College in Aurora, New York.

== Carpathia ==
The couple was among the first class passengers on the Cunard liner RMS Carpathia en route from New York to Gibraltar in April 1912, when it picked up the survivors of the RMS Titanic. They aided in the rescue of survivors and shared their room and took care of survivor Renee Harris, the wife of theatre manager Henry B. Harris, who had perished in the sinking. Colin Campbell Cooper subsequently made several paintings of the Titanic.

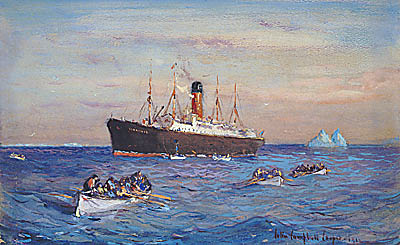
Colin Campbell Cooper, Rescue of the Survivors of the Titanic by the Carpathia, 1912, Midwest Museum of Art

== Death ==
She died in 1920 at home of her sister, Mrs. John Steele in Pittsford, New York on July 30. She is buried in Mount Hope Cemetery in Rochester, New York.

In January 1940, a retrospective exhibition of her works was held at George H. Brodhead Fine Arts in Rochester. Her and her husband's papers are held in the manuscript collection of the River Campus Libraries at the University of Rochester.

== Works ==
=== Europe or North America ===
- A Corner in the Studio, oil, 1882–1897
- A Dutch Cavalier, water color, Memorial Art Gallery, University of Rochester
- Adobe House, oil, c. 1900, private collection
- An Old Mill, Holland, water color, 1897–1917
- At Colorado Springs, Colorado, oil, at "Cragsmoor Artist's Vision of Nature" exhibition, Cragsmoor Free Library, New York in 1977
- Bee Hives in a French Garden, drawing, 1888, Memorial Art Gallery, University of Rochester
- Behind the Dunes
- Brittany Farmyard, oil, 1882–1897
- Canal in Holland, water color, c. 1885–1897
- Cape Cod Vista, oil, Memorial Art Museum, University of Rochester
- Courtyard, oil, private owner
- Crooked Houses, oil, c. 1897–1910
- Dutch Interior, oil, 1882–1897
- Geranium, oil
- Gray Day, oil, 1882–1897
- Gray Day, Mystic, Connecticut, oil, 1882–1897
- Hillside in Picardy
- Landscape, Autumn, water color, c. 1897–1920
- Landscape, France, oil, 1882–1897
- Life Work, oil, labor interior scene, Weatherspoon Art Museum, Greensboro, North Carolina
- Little Shop, oil, c. 1900
- Little Shop, Holland, oil, at "A Century of women artists in Cragsmoor: original works by women artists who have created in Cragsmoor during the past 100 years," Cragsmoor, N.Y.: Cragsmoor Free Library, 1979
- Morning Near Riverdale, oil, c. 1885, Wells College, Aurora, New York
- New England Vista, oil, Memorial Art Gallery, University of Rochester
- Old Well, Pittfield, New York, water color, c. 1885–1897, Strong Museum, One Manhattan Square, Rochester, New York
- On a French River, painting, Memorial Art Gallery, University of Rochester
- Rose Covered Verandah, oil, 1897–1920
- Roses – still life, oil, in 1987 at Lagakos-Turak Gallery, Philadelphia
- San Diego Exposition 1916, oil, interior scene, private collection
- Side Door of a Manor House, Touraine, oil, 1897–1920
- Spurting Rock, water color, 1885–1897
- Still Life, water color, 1897–1920
- The Breadwinner, water color, 1891, Memorial Art Gallery, University of Rochester
- The Farm House, water color, c. 1885–1897
- The Marsh, oil
- Through the Meadows in Holland
- Untitled (landscape with bridge), painting, Memorial Art Gallery, University of Rochester
- Weaving Homespun, Canada, oil, c. 1904, Memorial Art Gallery, University of Rochester
- Wheelwright at Work, oil, figure drawing, c. 1880
- Wheelwright at Work, oil, interior scene, c. 1880
- Windmills, oil, 1897–1920
- Young Boys in Landscape, oil, in 1987 at Lagakos-Turak Gallery, Philadelphia

=== India ===
Works made in India in 1913 and exhibited in the Memorial Art Gallery in Rochester and Milwaukee in 1915 include:

- Bazaar at Little Agra
- Bombay Street
- Candy bazaar, Agra
- Ceylon House Servant
- Chauk bazaar, Lucknow
- Delhi Fruit Stand
- Dye house at Udaipur
- Entrance to a Temple, Jaipur
- Holy Man's Tomb at Agra, oil, c. 1895, Wells College, Aurora, New York
- Leogryphs, Rangood, Burma, water color
- Native quarter, Bombay, water color
- Snake charmer
- Street corner, Udaipur
- Street of dye houses, Little Agra
- Temple at Little Agra
- Tomb at Agra, water color
- Water carrier
