= Briann Greenfield =

Cultural historian

- Education: Brown University
- Scientific career
- Thesis: Old New England in the twentieth-century imagination : public memory in Salem, Deerfield, Providence, and the Smithsonian Institution (2002)

Briann Greenfield is an American academic and author. She is the director of the Division of Preservation and Access at the National Endowment for the Humanities.

== Early life and education ==
Greenfield grew up in New Hampshire and had an interest in history from a young age. Greenfield has a B.A. from the University of New Hampshire (1992). She has an M.A. (1996) and a Ph.D. (2002) from Brown University.

== Career ==
Greenfield joined the faculty at Central Connecticut State University in 2001 and was promoted to full professor in 2012. She moved to work as the director of the New Jersey Council for the Humanities in 2014. While there she advocated the cultural infrastructure needed for the humanities in New Jersey. In 2018 Greenfield moved to the Harriet Beecher Stowe House (Hartford, Connecticut) in 2018, where she remained until she accepted a position at the National Endowment for the Humanities in 2021.

Greenfield is the author of two books. The first was on antiquing in the United States. Her second book centered on Jewish farmers in Connecticut.

== Selected publications ==
- Greenfield, Briann (2009). Out of the attic : inventing antiques in twentieth-century New England. Amherst [Mass.]: University of Massachusetts Press. ISBN 978-1-61376-098-7. OCLC 794701581.
- Donohoe, Mary M.; Greenfield, Ph D. Briann G. (2010). A Life of the Land: Connecticut's Jewish Farmers. Jewish Historical Society of Greater Hartford. ASIN B01AASSYA4.

== Awards and honors ==
Central Connecticut State University awarded Greenfield the Board of Trustees research award in 2010.
