= Charlotte B. Coman =

American painter (1833–1924)

Charlotte Buell Coman
- Born: 1833; Waterville, New York, United States
- Died: 1924 (aged 90–91); Yonkers, New York, United States
- Known for: Painting
- Style: Landscape art

Charlotte Buell Coman (1833 – November 11, 1924) was an American painter.

== Biography ==
Coman was born in Waterville, New York in 1833. She married and moved with her husband to Iowa City, then on the American Frontier, only to return to Waterville after his death a few years later. She began to experience hearing loss, and was almost completely deaf by the time she turned 40.

Coman did not take up painting until she was in her mid 40s. She studied in New York with James Renwick Brevoort and in Paris with Harry Thompson and Émile Louis Vernier. With Vernier she studied plein-air and watercolor painting, and sketched on trips to rural parts of France and Holland. She was influenced by the French Barbizon painters, especially Jean-Baptiste Corot and Charles-Francois Daubigny, and her popular works were compared to those of Corot. Her artwork betrays a Barbizon-influenced preoccupation with the way that natural light is affected by time of day and weather conditions.

After ten years spent abroad, Coman returned to New York and focused on painting American landscapes in the tonalist style. Her paintings were based on sketches made on trips to the Adirondacks, New Jersey, and Saint Augustine, Florida. She painted quiet, atmospheric landscapes with high horizon lines, often dominated by one muted color and using a heavy impasto. Her canvases are signed "C.B. Coman"; like many women artists of her era, she used her initials to conceal her gender.

Coman showed two paintings at the National Academy of Design in 1875, and she showed her work often in New York and at the Paris Salons. She exhibited her work at the Palace of Fine Arts at the 1893 World's Columbian Exposition in Chicago, Illinois.

In 1905 Coman received the Shaw Memorial Prize given by the Society of American Artists. She was elected an associate of the National Academy of Design in 1910. Coman was also a member of the National Association of Women Painters and Sculptors, the New York Watercolor Club, and the Art Workers' Club.

Coman continued sketching and painting until she was in her eighties. She died in Yonkers, New York in 1924.

Her work is in the collections of the Metropolitan Museum of Art and the Arnot Art Museum. A portrait of her by Helen Watson Phelps is in the collection of the National Academy of Design.

== Selected works ==
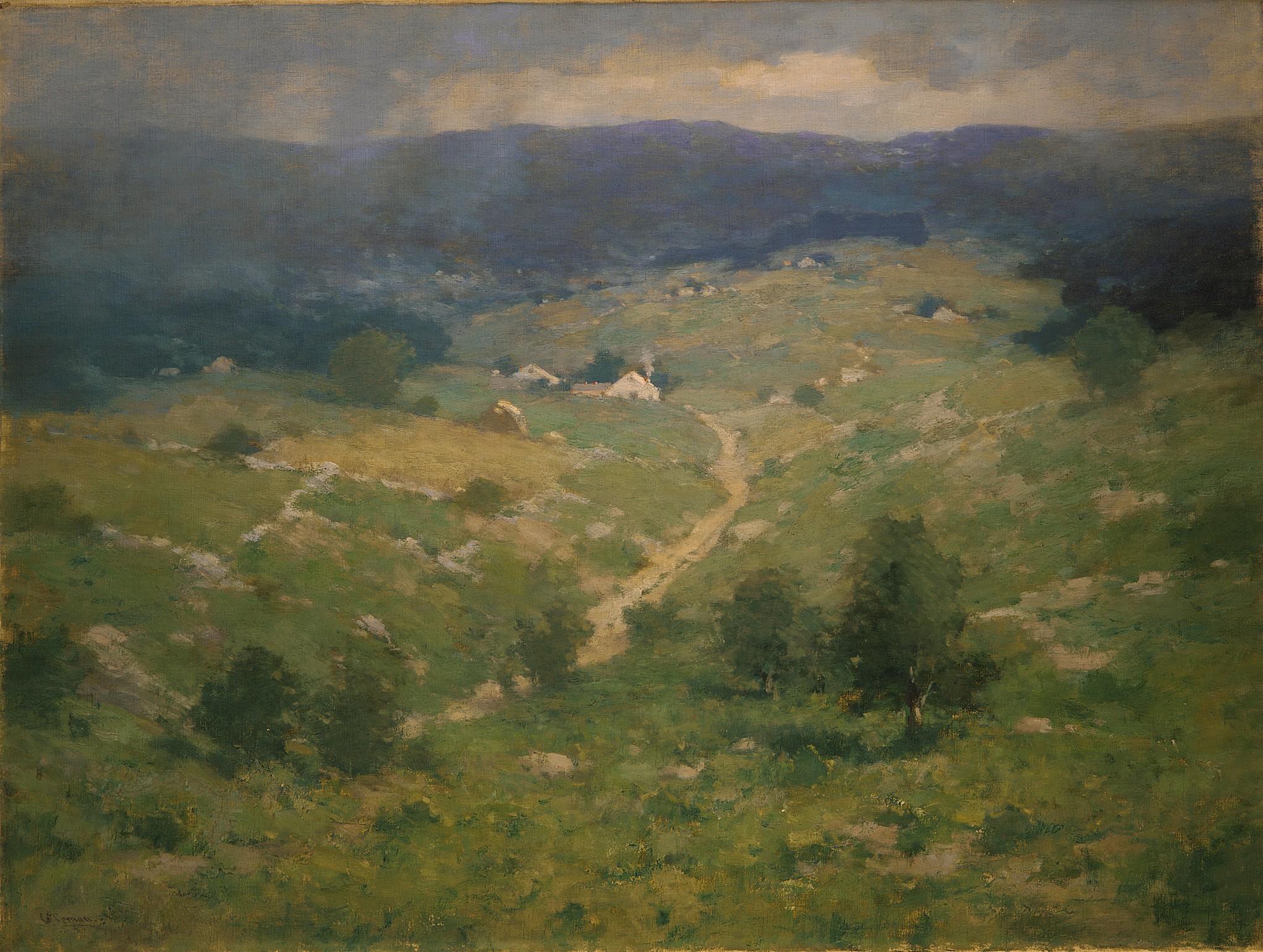
"Clearing Off", 1887–1908. In the collection of the Metropolitan Museum of Art

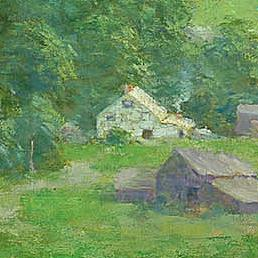
"Early Summer", in the collection of the Smithsonian American Art Museum
