= George Rollie Adams =

American educator and historian (born 1941)

- Born: September 11, 1941 (age 84)
- Education: Louisiana Tech University (BA, MA); University of Arizona (PhD)
- Occupations: Educator; historian; author

George Rollie Adams (born September 11, 1941), is an American educator, historian, author, and museum professional. As president and CEO of The Strong National Museum of Play in Rochester, New York, from 1987 through 2016, Adams led the development of the world's first collections-based history museum devoted solely to the study of play and its critical role in learning and human development and the ways in which play illuminates cultural history. During his tenure, The Strong became home to the world's most comprehensive collection of toys, dolls, board games, electronic games, and other artifacts and documents pertaining to the history of play. The Strong also acquired the National Toy Hall of Fame and established the International Center for the History of Electronic Games, World Video Game Hall of Fame, Brian Sutton-Smith Library and Archives of Play, Woodbury School, and American Journal of Play.

== Early life ==
George Rollie Adams grew up in southern Arkansas. After receiving a B.A. in Social Science Education and English from Louisiana Tech University, he taught history for four years at El Dorado, Arkansas, High School. While teaching, he earned a M.A. in Social Science Education from Louisiana Tech University, and subsequently he earned a Ph.D. in American History from the University of Arizona.

== Professional career ==
During the mid-to-late 1970s and early 1980s, Adams held several positions at the American Association for State and Local History, including director of the National Historic Landmarks Project and director of Education. He then served two years as executive director of the Buffalo and Erie County Historical Society in New York State and two years jointly as director of the Louisiana State Museum in New Orleans and assistant secretary for Culture, Recreation, and Tourism for the State of Louisiana.

At The Strong, Adams introduced a boundary-less organizational structure, led two major physical expansions, led the conceptualization and early planning for a third, and earned recognition for innovation in entrepreneurial museum management. He is currently president and CEO emeritus of The Strong.

Adams has served on the boards of the American Alliance of Museums, National History Day, Mid-South Humanities Project, Museum Association of New York, New York State Historical Records Advisory Board, Rochester Downtown Development Corporation, Visit Rochester, Family Services of Rochester, and Martin Luther King, Jr. Greater Rochester Commission. He has also served on the Finger Lakes Regional Economic Development Council Working Group on the Arts and Tourism.

He is recipient of the CEO of the Year Award from the Rochester Chapter of the Public Relations Society of America, Tourism Civic Award from Visit Rochester, Anne Ackerson Innovation in Leadership Award from the Museum Association of New York, and Rochester Business Journal ICON Award for Success and Leadership.

== Published works ==
Adams's latest books are South of Little Rock, Found in Pieces, and Look Unto the Land, historical novels set in rural southern Arkansas during the pre-Civil Rights era of the 1950s and the oil boom era of the 1920s. Among them, they have received nineteen awards for independently published historical and social issues fiction. His previous published works include Ordinary People and Everyday Life, co-edited with James B. Gardner (American Association for State and Local History, 1980); Nashville: A Pictorial History, co-authored with Ralph Jerry Christian (The Donning Company, 1981, 1988); and General William S. Harney: Prince of Dragoons (University of Nebraska Press, 2001). He contributed forewords to David Carr, The Promise of Cultural Institutions (New York: AltaMira Press, 2003) and Scott G. Eberle, Classic Toys of the National Toy Hall of Fame (Running Press, 2009).
