= The Garden of The Hesperides =

1900 painting by M. Louise Stowell

The Garden of The Hersperides
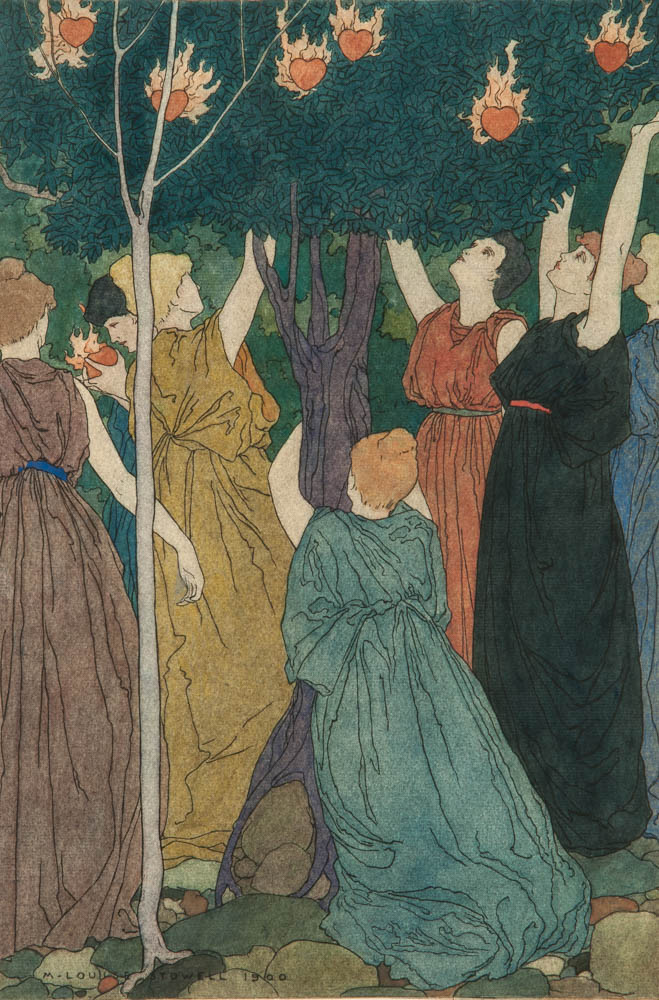
- Artist: M. Louise Stowell
- Year: 1900
- Medium: Watercolor, pastel, charcoal, and ink on laid paper
- Dimensions: 43.6 x 29.3 cm
- Location: Memorial Art Gallery, Rochester, NY

The Garden of The Hesperides is a watercolor and mixed-media painting from 1900 by M. Louise Stowell, a Rochester-based Arts & Crafts artist. Influenced by Japanese art aesthetics, mysticism, and Symbolism, this piece depicts the mythology of the Hesperides. It references Spirituality ideologies, including Christianity. Originally owned by Margaret Woodbury Strong, it is now a part of the Memorial Art Gallery of Rochester's permanent Collection.

== The painting ==
The Garden of the Hesperides is a mixed media piece from the United States. It uses watercolor, pastel, charcoal, and ink, measuring 43.9 by 29.3 centimeters.

Vertically oriented, the compositional structure of the scene contains three sections with trees used as dividing lines. The first section holds two women; one faces away from the viewer, extending off the picture plane, with reddish-brown hair pulled into a bun, similar in style to the other six, wearing a brown robe or dress with a blue belt. The other woman is seen in profile, gazing into a flaming heart that she holds in her hands. A thin, twig-like tree that stretching from the bottom to the top of the work creates the next section. This section features a single woman facing away from the viewer with yellow hair and a gold dress, reaching into the center tree that divides the second from the third section. The final section takes up roughly half the page and contains four women. One facing away, wearing a green dress and kneeling in front of the tree with her arm wrapped around its trunk. The following two women stand side by side in profile view, wearing red and black dresses, reaching into the tree's branches like the woman in gold. Behind them, a sliver of the final woman's blue dress and yellow hair as she steps off the picture plane. Vertical lines created by the surrounding foliage point to the focal point of the piece: the branches and leaves of the central tree. In the branches there is a collection of red heart shapes, set on fire with gold-yellow flames, sit in the branches and leaves like fruit.

== Interpretation ==
The artwork's moderate size, about the size of a small poster, encourages intimate engagement, allowing observers to closely examine the details of the seven female figures and the enigmatic central tree, prompting viewers to explore the deeper narratives and symbolism embedded within the imagery.

The use of line and color contributes to the mythological quality of the piece. Stowell's mixing of watercolor, charcoal, and ink creates a muddy and muted color palette. Primarily done in neutral colors, Stowell employs a palette of muted yellows, greens, blues, and reds, laying the colors down while using black ink lines to outline the details of the women, surrounding nature, and hearts. The black lines, lack of gradient, no interaction between colors, and shading flatten the piece, produce a style reminiscent of posters from the Art Nouveau era of the late 19th century and early 20th century. The color palette and lines provide a flat, non-dimensional, quality to the piece, removing it from realism into graphic arts.

Stowell nods to the ancient Greek myth of the Hesperides, a story about a magical garden where the Hesperides, the seven daughters of the evening, tended to a tree bearing golden apples. Instead of apples Stowell uses the Sacred Heart. She connects her visual interpretation to The Garden of the Hesperides through the themes of mystery, the divine, and the passage between earthly and mythical realms, which are central to the original myth.

The close-cropped composition of the work creates a scene in which a viewer is—purposefully—absorbed into the crowd of women worshipping the tree. The scene is clustered, raising questions about the significance of the tree these seven women surround.

== Style ==
Stowell's The Garden of the Hesperides connects to both the Arts and Crafts movement and the Symbolism Movement. The Arts and Crafts movement valued craftsmanship and the beauty of nature. It is reflected here in the detailed portrayal of the mythical garden, emphasizing organic forms and natural elements. Similarly, the work aligns with the Symbolist movement, which often focused on myth, mystery, and inner emotional or spiritual experiences. The use of dreamlike imagery and references to mythology in The Garden of the Hesperides suggests an engagement with Symbolism's interest in exploring beyond the material world.

== Provenance ==
The artwork was donated by Margaret Woodbury Strong to the Strong Museum in Rochester. It was deaccessioned and purchased by the Memorial Art Gallery in 2016.
