= Barbie Queen of the Prom =

1960 children's board game

Barbie Queen of the Prom is a children's board game first published by Mattel in 1960, based on the popular Barbie doll franchise. The game has been revised and republished several times. The above image is not the original 1960 version featuring "Ponytail Barbie," but a later version, featuring the 1961 "Bubble-cut Barbie."

== Description ==
Barbie Queen of the Prom is a children's board game for 2 to 4 players. The game includes 4 character pieces, a board, a die, fake money, and "Surprise!" cards.

=== Gameplay ===
Players take on the role of Barbie and travel around the board by rolling the die. The aim of the game is to reach the center of the board to be crowned prom queen. Each player must complete various tasks in order to achieve the criteria needed:

- have a steady boyfriend,
- have a prom dress
- be elected president of a school club.

== Publication history ==
The quick success of the Barbie doll in the late 1950s encouraged Mattel to produce toys and games related to the franchise. In 1960, this included the games Barbie's Keys to Fame and Barbie Queen of the Prom. The latter game proved popular and it was published until the 1970s.

The game was republished in 1991 as Barbie Queen of the Prom - 1990s Edition. In 1994, a replica of the original game was released to coincide with the game's 35th anniversary. Another version was released in 2006 titled The Barbie Game Queen of the Prom.

== Reception ==
Mary Kay Verhoff recalled this as her favorite game when she was a child, writing, "The problem was that all my little girlfriends and I wanted the same dates for the prom, either Tom or Ken. Bob was okay, but no one ever wanted to get stuck with the nerdy Pointdexter! Furthermore, when you were just about to become queen, you had to return home to wash your hair or because you had a headache. No wonder girls learned from a young age all about headaches! We played that game over and over until the board and pieces all wore out."

Rick Polizzi, writing in Spin Again: Board Games from the Fifties and Sixties, sarcastically pointed out, "Mattel promoted this as a game with real-life appeal. What could be more realistic? All you had to do was become president of a school club, buy the right evening dress with your meager allowance and the baby-sitting money you'd saved, get a steady boyfriend, and, that's it, you win!"

In Barbie's Queer Accessories, Erica Rand noted that, despite Mattel's commitment to greater diversity, even by 1991 the game was clearly not in keeping with that since "a blond, white Barbie graced the cover of the new Barbie Queen of the Prom."

== Other recognition ==
A copy of Barbie Queen of the Prom is held in the collection of the Strong National Museum of Play (object 92.1396).
