= Margaret Strong =

Margaret Strong may refer to:

- Margaret Rockefeller Strong de Larraín, Marquesa de Cuevas (1897–1985), Rockefeller granddaughter and activist
- Margaret Strong De Patta (1903–1964), American jeweller
- Margaret Woodbury Strong (1897–1969), American toy collector and philanthropist
