= Videotopia =

Exhibition about the history of video games

Videotopia is a travelling science museum exhibition documenting the history of video games. Originally created by Keith Feinstein, it is based on a larger collection of video game machines, now housed at The Strong in Rochester, New York.

== Collection ==
It includes a wide range of commercial video arcade machines and game consoles, and also interactive multimedia kiosks containing information about the history of the games' development and their impact on popular culture. By 1996, the exhibit had had 20,000 attendees. In 1998, Feinstein's collection included 300 machines, and the touring exhibit had 75 of them. By 2009 the touring exhibition included 100 machines, and the collection amounted to 15,000 items relating to video games.

Videotopia was operated by Feinstein's longtime curatorial partner Jeff Anderson, who maintained the exhibit's vast game collection, based in New Jersey. Later Jon-Paul Dyson took over and the collection moved to the International Center for the History of Electronic Games at The Strong in Rochester, New York.

Videotopia has been featured at numerous science museums in the U.S., such as the Franklin Institute in Philadelphia, as well as overseas and in selected performances of Video Games Live. Videotopia has been featured on television on CBS: This Morning, the History Channel, CNN, CNBC, and many local television news programs and written about in Forbes magazine, USA Today, Technology Review, TICKET, and Next Generation.

In September 2009, the National Center for the History of Electronic Games made an announcement on the Strong National Museum of Play website that they acquired the Videotopia collection. The exhibit occurring at the time was extended until January. Additionally, Jon-Paul Dyson of NCHEG expressed their commitment to continue to have a rotating display of games from the Videotopia collect. Games that have been on display at the museum include Atari Football (1979), Space War (1977), Space Encounters (1980), Space War (1982), Space Attack (1979), and Space Invaders (1978).
