= Louise Stowell =

Louise Stowell may refer to:

- Louise Reed Stowell, American scientist, microscopist, author, and editor
- M. Louise Stowell, American painter, illustrator, craftsperson, and teacher
