= Keith Feinstein =

Video game historian

Keith Feinstein is a video game historian, creator of Videotopia, a traveling museum exhibition that chronicles the history of video games, and co-founder and Creative Director of Eureka Exhibits, an exhibit company focused on advancing science education through interactive installations that utilize video game technology. In 1993 Feinstein founded the Electronics Conservancy, an organization focused on the preservation, restoration, and education about electronic media, especially vintage arcade games and classic computer systems. He has appeared in the TV documentary series Modern Marvels (Video Games: Behind the Fun, 2000) and the CNBC documentary Game On! (2003), credited in each as video game historian. Videotopia was displayed at the inaugural Video Games Live concert at the Hollywood Bowl in 2005, which featured classic video game themes played by the Los Angeles Philharmonic Orchestra. Feinstein and Videotopia have been featured in Forbes Magazine and the MIT Technology Review.
