= The Legend of Zelda (video game) =

1986 video game

- North American NES box art. On physical copies, the top-left quadrant of the shield is a cutout that shows the gold cartridge inside.
- Developer: Nintendo R&D4
- Publisher: Nintendo
- Directors: Shigeru Miyamoto; Takashi Tezuka
- Producer: Shigeru Miyamoto
- Designers: Shigeru Miyamoto; Takashi Tezuka
- Programmers: Toshihiko Nakago; Yasunari Soejima; I. Marui
- Writers: Takashi Tezuka; Keiji Terui
- Composer: Koji Kondo
- Series: The Legend of Zelda
- Platforms: Famicom Disk System, NES, GameCube, Game Boy Advance
- Release: February 21, 1986: Famicom Disk System; JP: February 21, 1986 NES; NA: August 22, 1987; PAL: November 15, 1987; JP: February 19, 1994 Game Boy Advance; JP: February 14, 2004; NA: June 2, 2004; PAL: July 9, 2004
- Genre: Action-adventure
- Mode: Single-player

The Legend of Zelda (Note: Japanese: ゼルダの伝説, Hepburn: Zeruda no Densetsu) (Note: The Japanese version has a subtitle, "THE HYRULE FANTASY", written entirely in romaji above the main Japanese title on the official logo, but this is often omitted when the title is written in plain text such as on the spines of the disk card itself and its manual. This subtitle is also present in the Famicom cartridge release Zelda no Densetsu 1.) (Note: At the end of the Second Quest in both the Japanese and English versions, the final credit and copyright notice identifies the game as The Legend of Zelda 1 (ゼルダノデンセツ １).) is a 1986 action-adventure game developed and published by Nintendo for the Family Computer Disk System. It is the first game in the Legend of Zelda series. It is set in the fantasy land of Hyrule and centers on an elf-like boy named Link, who aims to collect the eight fragments of the Triforce of Wisdom to rescue Princess Zelda from Ganon. The player controls Link from a top-down perspective and navigates the overworld and dungeons, collecting weapons, defeating enemies and uncovering secrets. It was designed and directed by Shigeru Miyamoto and Takashi Tezuka, being in development alongside Super Mario Bros., which was released on September 13, 1985.

The Legend of Zelda was released in Japan as a launch game for the Family Computer Disk System on February 21, 1986. More than a year later, in late 1987, it was released in North America and Europe on the Nintendo Entertainment System in cartridge format by which time a sequel had already been released in Japan. The US version was one of the first games to include an internal battery for saving data. This version was released in Japan on February 19, 1994 as Zelda no Densetsu 1. (Note: Japanese: ゼルダの伝説1, Hepburn: Zeruda no Densetsu Wan; lit. The Legend of Zelda 1)

The Legend of Zelda is regarded as one of the most influential and greatest video games of all time. It was a critical and commercial success, selling over 6.5 million copies and launching a major franchise. A sequel, Zelda II: The Adventure of Link, was released in Japan for the Famicom Disk System less than a year later on January 21, 1987, and numerous sequels and spin-offs have been released since. The game has received numerous ports and remakes, in addition to re-releases on the Virtual Console and Nintendo Classics services. It was also one of 30 games included in the NES Classic Edition system.

== Gameplay ==
Link attacking Octorok monsters with his sword in the overworld

The Legend of Zelda incorporates elements of action, adventure, and role-playing genres. The player controls Link from a flip-screen overhead perspective as he travels the overworld, a large outdoor map with various environments. Link begins the game equipped only with a small shield, but can enter a cave and receive a sword from an old man who advises, "It's dangerous to go alone! Take this." Throughout the adventure, Link finds and acquires various items that increase his abilities further, including heart containers which increase his life meter, and magic rings which decrease the amount of damage Link takes from enemy attacks. These items are mainly found in caves scattered throughout the land. Some are easily accessible, while others are hidden beneath obstacles such as rocks, trees, and waterfalls, as well as being purchasable from merchants. Rupees, the in-game currency, can also be found in hidden treasure caves and are used to buy equipment, information, and ability upgrades.

Hidden in the overworld are entrances to eight large dungeons housing the pieces of the Triforce of Wisdom. Each dungeon has a unique maze-like layout of rooms connected by doors and secret passages, often barred by monsters (which must be defeated) or by blocks (which must be moved to gain entrance). Dungeons also contain useful items Link can add to his inventory, such as a boomerang for stunning enemies and retrieving distant items, and a magical recorder that lets Link teleport to the entrance of any dungeon he has previously cleared. Once Link has collected all eight pieces of the Triforce of Wisdom from these dungeons, he gains access to a ninth and final dungeon in order to defeat Ganon and rescue Zelda. There are dungeons with secret entrances which must be uncovered while freely wandering the overworld after acquiring useful items. This freedom allows many ways of progressing through the game. It is possible to reach the final boss without receiving the normally vital sword at its outset. The game world contains 600 separate scenes, with the overworld consisting of over 97 scenes and the underworld consisting of nine multi-scene labyrinths.

After initially completing the game, a player can begin a more difficult version referred to as the "Second Quest" (裏ゼルダ, Ura Zeruda; translated literally to "Other Zelda"), which alters many locations, secrets, and includes entirely distinct dungeons and stronger enemies. Although more difficult "replays" were not unique to Zelda, few games offered completely different levels upon the second playthrough.

== Plot ==
=== Setting ===
Within the official Zelda Chronology, The Legend of Zelda takes place in an Era called the "Era of Decline", which is part of the "Defeated Hero" timeline that connects to an alternate reality scenario where the Hero of Time is defeated by Ganondorf in Ocarina of Time. In this era, Hyrule has been reduced to a small kingdom where the residents now live in caves, setting the background for The Legend of Zelda.

=== Story ===
The story of The Legend of Zelda is described in the instruction booklet and during the short prologue which plays after the title screen: The small kingdom of Hyrule is engulfed by chaos when an army led by Ganon, the prince of darkness, invades and steals the Triforce of Power, one part of a magical artifact which alone bestows great strength. In an attempt to prevent him from acquiring the Triforce of Wisdom, Princess Zelda splits it into eight fragments and hides them in secret underground dungeons. Before eventually being kidnapped by Ganon, she commands her nursemaid Impa to find someone courageous enough to save the kingdom. While wandering the land, the old woman is surrounded by Ganon's henchmen when a young boy named Link appears and rescues her. Upon hearing Impa's plea, he resolves to save Zelda and sets out to reassemble the scattered fragments of the Triforce of Wisdom, with which Ganon can then be defeated.

During the course of the tale, Link locates and braves the eight underworld labyrinths, and beyond their defeated guardian monsters, retrieves each fragment. With the completed Triforce of Wisdom, he is able to infiltrate Ganon's hideout in Death Mountain, confronting the prince of darkness and destroying him with the Silver Arrow. Obtaining the Triforce of Power from Ganon's ashes, Link returns it and the restored Triforce of Wisdom to the rescued Princess Zelda, and peace returns to Hyrule.

== Development ==
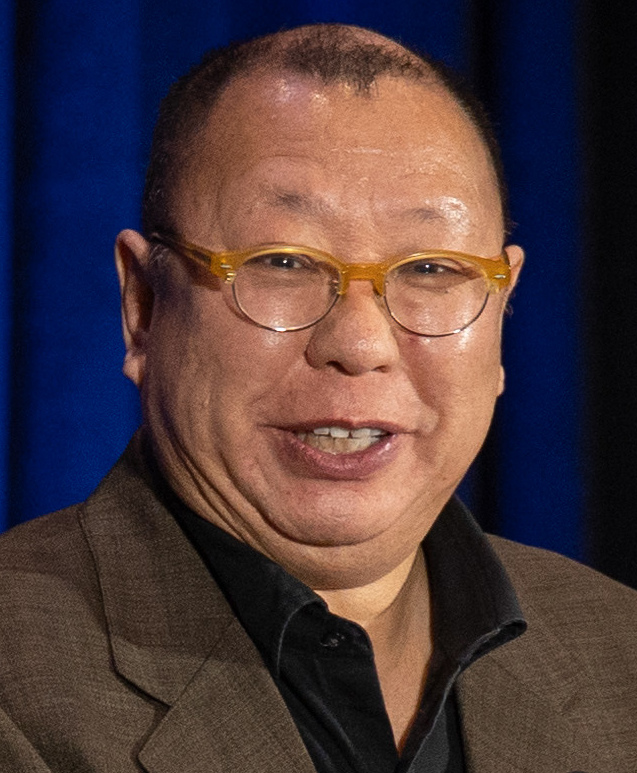
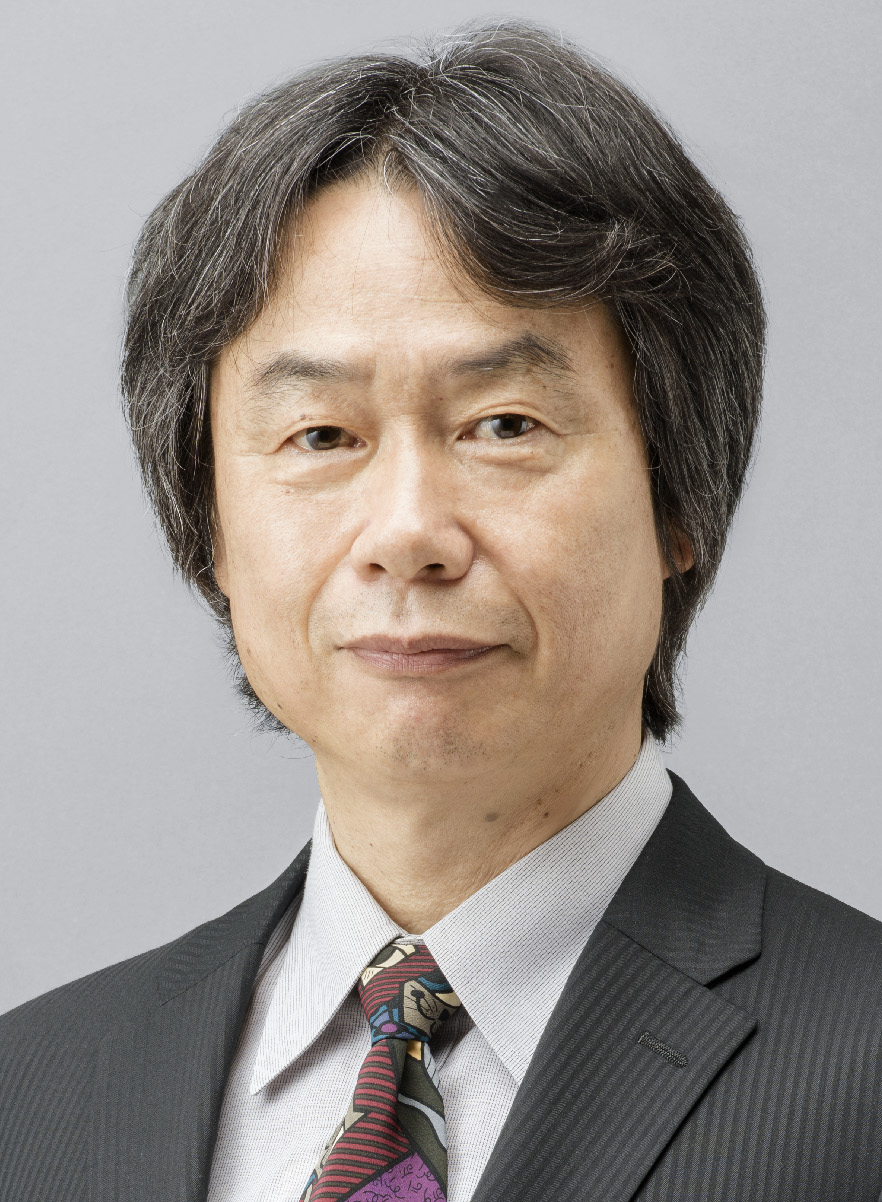
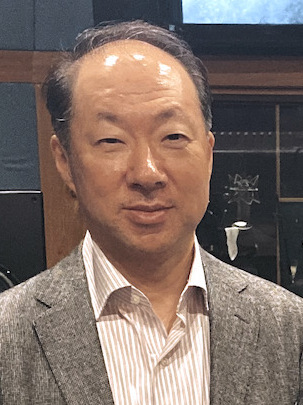
The two directors and composer pictured in 2024, 2015, and 2019, respectively: Takashi Tezuka, Shigeru Miyamoto, and Koji Kondo.

The Legend of Zelda was directed and designed by Shigeru Miyamoto and Takashi Tezuka (credited as S. Miyahon and Ten Ten, respectively, in the closing credits). Miyamoto produced the game, and Tezuka wrote the story and script. Much of the programming was done by Toshihiko Nakago of Nintendo's partner SRD. Keiji Terui, a screenwriter who worked on anime shows such as Dr. Slump and Dragon Ball, wrote the backstory for the manual, drawing inspiration from conflicts in medieval Europe. Development began in the fall of 1984, and the game was originally intended to be a launch game for the Famicom Disk System. The development team worked on The Legend of Zelda and Super Mario Bros. concurrently, and tried to separate their ideas: Super Mario Bros. was to be linear, where the action occurred in a strict sequence, whereas The Legend of Zelda would be the opposite. In Mario, Miyamoto downplayed the importance of the high score in favor of simply completing the game. This concept was carried over to The Legend of Zelda. Miyamoto was also in charge of deciding which concepts were "Zelda ideas" or "Mario ideas". Contrasting with Mario, Zelda was made non-linear and forced the players to think about what they should do next. According to Miyamoto, those in Japan were confused and had trouble finding their way through the multi-path dungeons, and in initial game designs, the player would start with the sword already in their inventory. Rather than merely simplifying matters for players, Miyamoto forced the player to listen to the old man who gives them their sword and encouraged interaction among people to share their ideas with each other to find the various hidden secrets, a new form of gaming communication. Relatedly, this concept became the root of another series developed many years later: Miyamoto said that Zelda became the inspiration for Animal Crossing, a game based solely on communication.

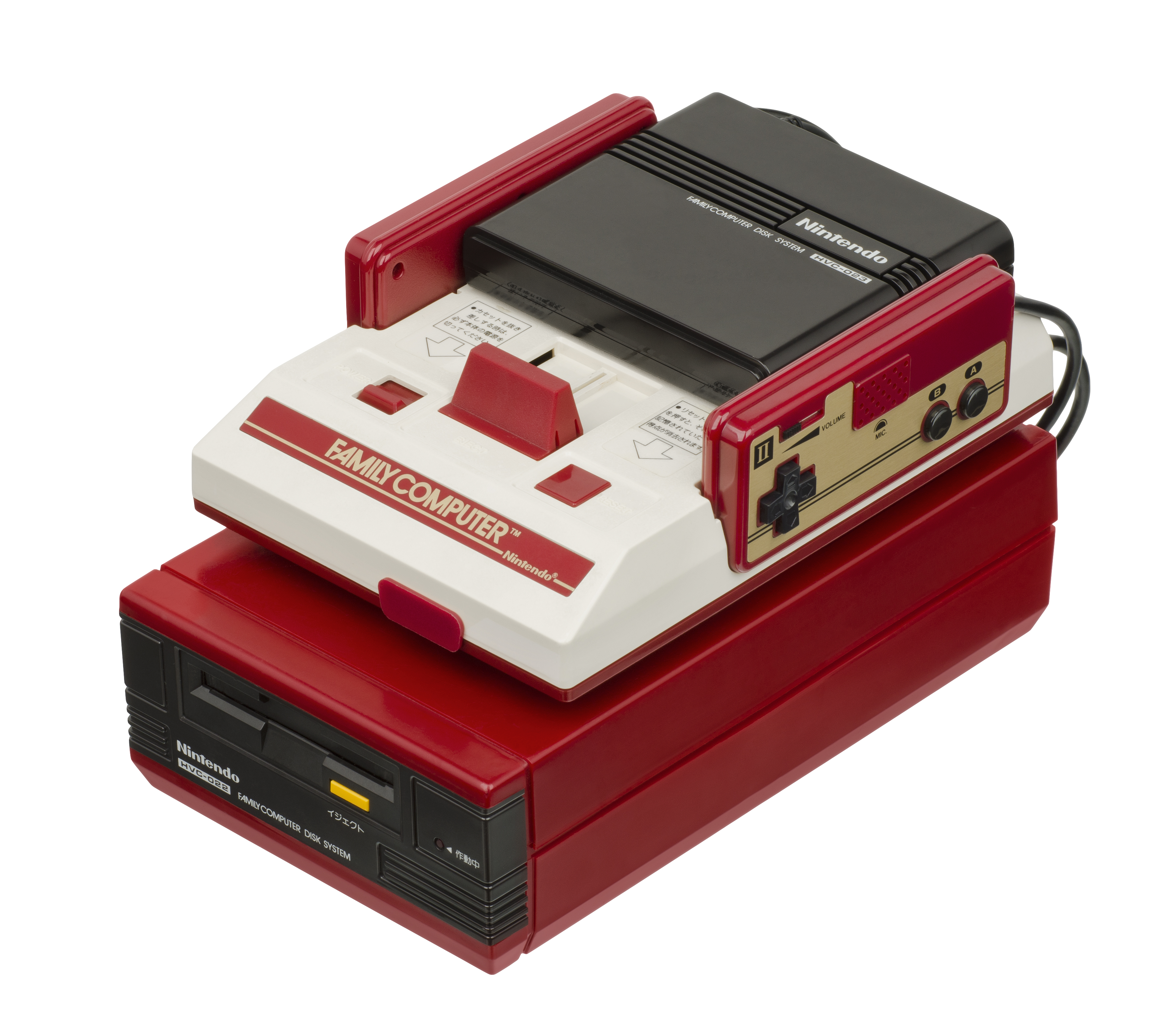
The game was first released in Japan as a disk for the Famicom Disk System. It was later converted to a cartridge for American release on the NES.

With The Legend of Zelda, Miyamoto wanted to flesh out the idea of a game "world" even further, giving players a "miniature garden that they can put inside their drawer". He drew his inspiration from his experiences as a boy around Kyoto, where he explored nearby fields, woods, and caves, always trying through Zelda games to impart players some sense of that limitless wonder he felt through unknown exploration. According to Miyamoto: "When I was a child, I went hiking and found a lake. It was quite a surprise for me to stumble upon it. When I traveled around the country without a map, trying to find my way, stumbling on amazing things as I went, I realized how it felt to go on an adventure like this." The memory of being lost amid the maze of sliding doors in his family's home in Sonobe was recreated in Zelda's labyrinthian dungeons. Miyamoto was also influenced by The Black Onyx and Ultima, saying that he found the character's process of gaining strength to be fun. Tezuka also wrote the setting to be a fairytale adventure, taking inspiration from fantasy books such as J. R. R. Tolkien's The Lord of the Rings.

According to Miyamoto, early concepts involved technological elements, with the Triforce fragments being electronic circuits and the game taking place in both the past and the future. The hero "Link" was named with the idea of being the one connecting the two. The final game and subsequent games in the series follow a more traditional medieval-like sword and sorcery setting. The name of the titular princess came from Zelda Fitzgerald. Miyamoto explained that "Zelda was the wife of famous novelist F. Scott Fitzgerald. She was a famous and beautiful woman from all accounts, and I liked the sound of her name. So I took the liberty of using [it] for the very first title."

Koji Kondo (credited as Konchan) composed the game's five music tracks. Kondo had planned to use Maurice Ravel's Boléro as the title theme, as it perfectly matched its speed. However, Kondo was forced to change it in November 1985, late in the game's development, after learning that the piece was not yet in the public domain under Japanese law. As a result, Kondo wrote a new arrangement of the overworld theme within one day, which has become an iconic motif echoing throughout continued entries of the series.

== Release ==
=== Japanese release ===
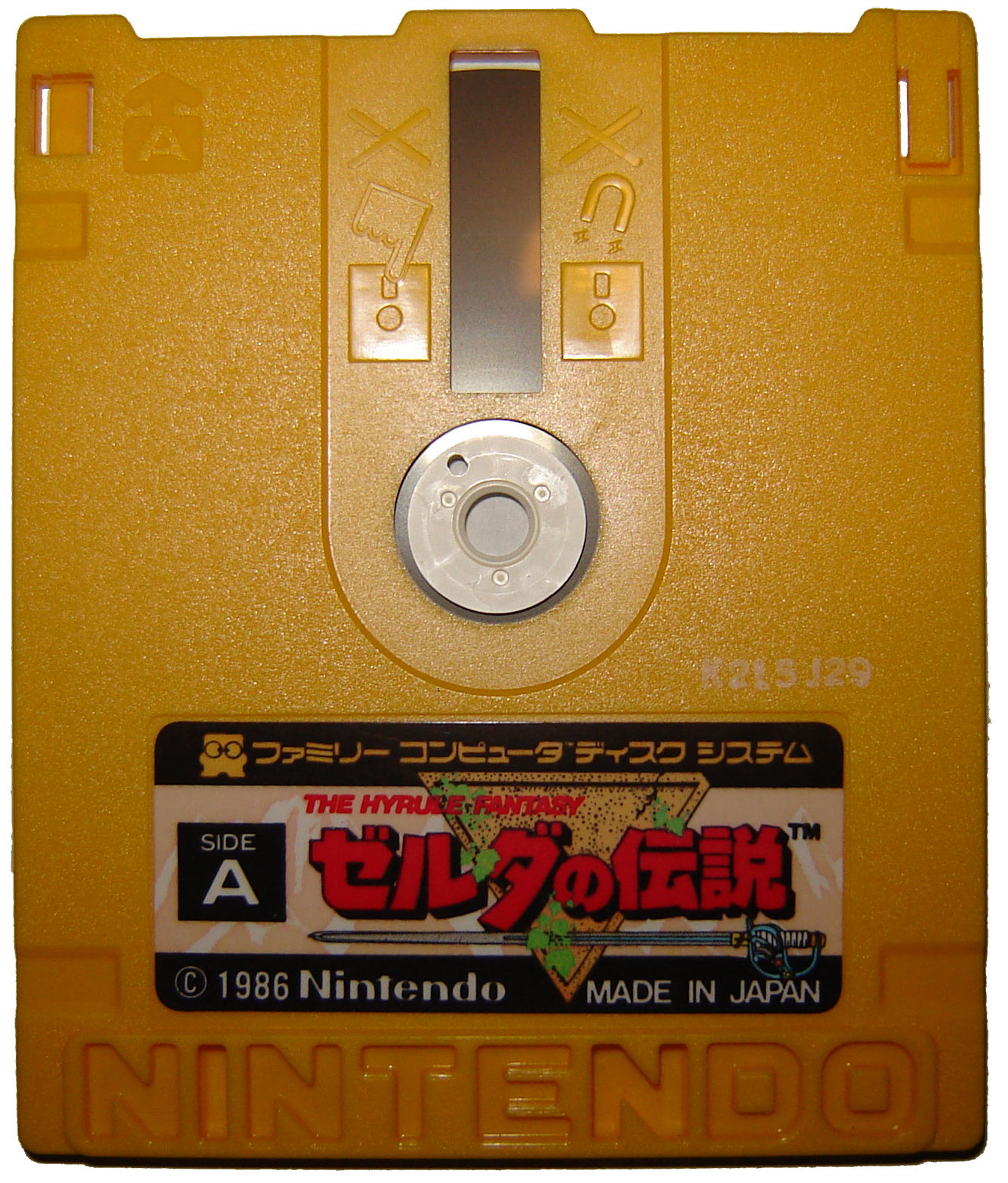
The original floppy disk release

In February 1986, Nintendo released The Legend of Zelda as the launch game for the Family Computer's new Disk System peripheral, joined by re-releases of Super Mario Bros., Tennis, Baseball, Golf, Soccer, and Mah-Jong as part of the system's introduction. It made full use of Disk Card media's advantages over traditional ROM cartridges, with an increased size of 128 kilobytes which would be expensive to produce on cartridge format. Due to the Famicom only supporting 256 tiles, all of the text used in the game was from only a single syllabary known as katakana, which under normal circumstances primarily relates more to foreign words which supplement those of traditional Japanese origin as with hiragana and kanji characters. Rather than passwords, rewritable disks saved players' game progress, and the extra sound channel provided by the system was utilized for certain sound effects; most notably Link's sword beam at full health, roars and growls of dungeon bosses, and those of defeated enemies. Sound effects had to be altered for the eventual cartridge release version of Zelda which used the Famicom's PCM channel. The game also took advantage of that system's controller having a built-in microphone, a feature the NES model did not include. It was used to defeat the large-eared rabbit-like monster Pols Voice by blowing or shouting. The U.S. instruction manual still hints that this enemy "hates loud noise", confusing many into thinking the recorder item could be used to attack (in actuality, it has no effect). The cartridge version made use of the Memory Management Controller chip (specifically the MMC1 model), which could use bank-switching to allow for larger games than had previously been possible, and could also use battery-powered RAM letting players save their data for the first time on the NES.

=== American release ===
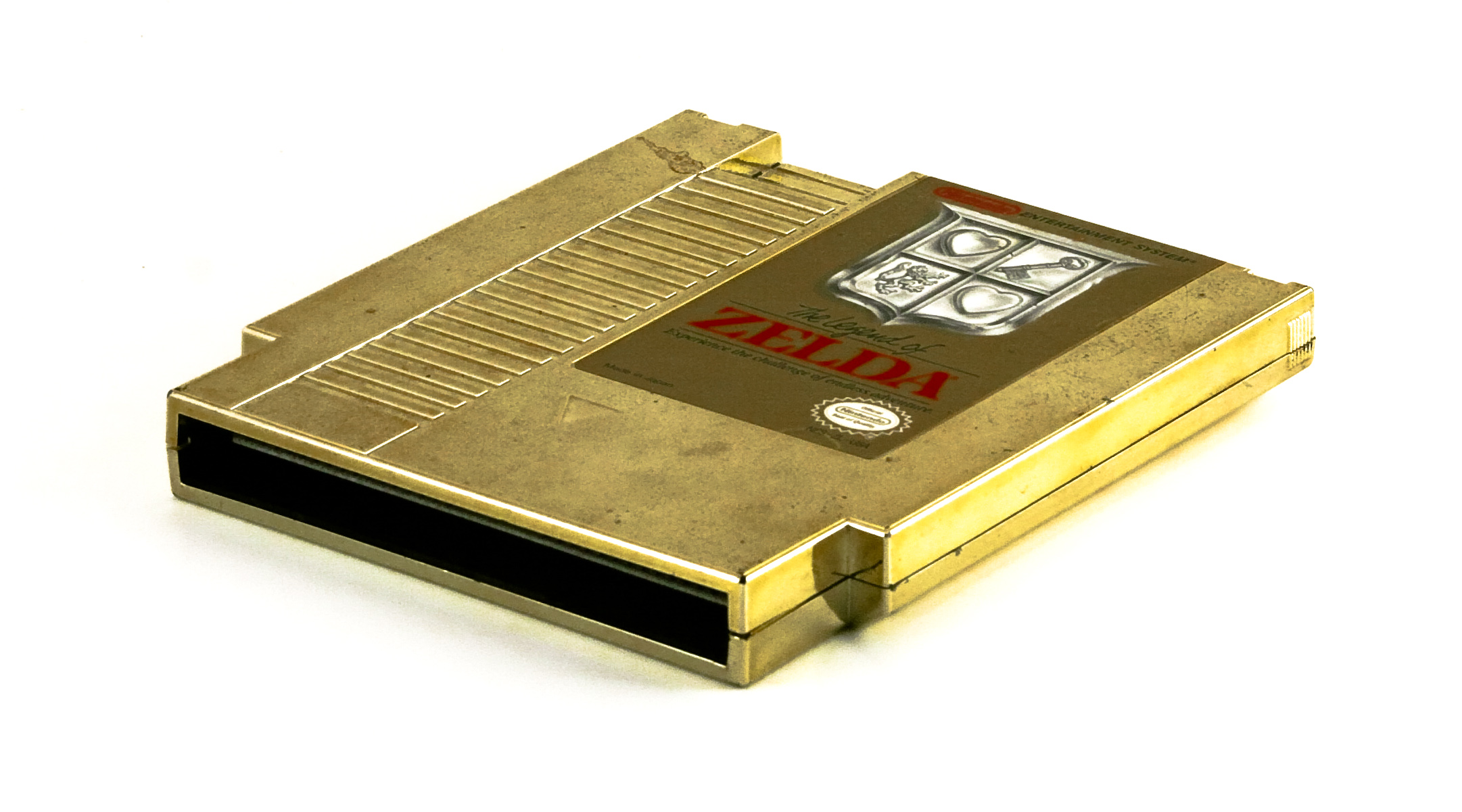
The gold-colored cartridge

When Nintendo published the game in North America, the packaging design featured a small portion of the box cut away to reveal the unique gold-colored cartridge. In 1988, The Legend of Zelda sold two million copies. Nintendo of America sought to keep its strong base of fans; anyone who purchased a game and sent in a warranty card became a member of the Fun Club, whose members got a four-, eight- and eventually 32-page newsletter. Seven hundred copies of the first issue were sent out free of charge, but the number grew as the data bank of names got larger.

From the success of magazines in Japan, Nintendo knew that game tips were a valued asset. Players enjoyed the bimonthly newsletter's crossword puzzles and jokes, but game secrets were most valued. The Fun Club drew kids in by offering tips for the more complicated games, especially Zelda, with its hidden rooms, secret keys and passageways. The mailing list grew. By early 1988, there were over 1 million Fun Club members, which led then-Nintendo of America president Minoru Arakawa to start the Nintendo Power magazine.

Since Nintendo did not have many products, it made only a few commercials a year, targeting high quality for each. The budget for a single commercial could reach US$5 million, four or five times more than most companies spent. One of the first commercials made under Bill White, director of advertising and public relations, was the market introduction for the Legend of Zelda, which received a great deal of attention in the ad industry. In it, a wiry-haired, nerdy guy (John Kassir) walks through the dark making goofy noises, yelling out the names of enemies from the game, and screaming for Zelda.

=== Re-releases ===
The Legend of Zelda was first re-released in cartridge format for the Famicom in 1994. The cartridge version slightly modified the title screen of the Disk Card version of the game, such that it displayed the number 1 at the end of the title. The original game was given an enhanced remake for the Super Famicom under the title BS Zelda no Densetsu (BSゼルダの伝説; lit. BS The Legend of Zelda) and broadcast via the Super Famicom Satellaview from August 1995 to January 1997. This version features remixed layouts of the original game map along with an original story, the player characters from BS-X, and a second remixed map was broadcast from December 1995 to March 1996. In 2001, the original game was re-released in the GameCube game Animal Crossing. An official re-release was included in 2003's The Legend of Zelda: Collector's Edition for the GameCube, and the game was again re-released on the Game Boy Advance in 2004 along with its sequel, The Adventure of Link, as part of the Famicom Mini/Classic NES Series. In 2006, it was released on the Wii's Virtual Console, and a timed demo of the game was released for the 2008 Wii game Super Smash Bros. Brawl, available in the Vault section.

All re-releases of the game are virtually identical to the original, though the GameCube, Game Boy Advance, and Virtual Console versions have been altered slightly to correct several instances of unusual grammar from the original, most notably in the intro story. A tech demo called Classic Games was shown for the Nintendo 3DS at E3 2010, showcasing more than a dozen classic games using 3D effects, including The Legend of Zelda. Reggie Fils-Aimé, president of Nintendo of America, said that the games were slated for release on the 3DS, including The Legend of Zelda, Mega Man 2, and Super Mario World 2: Yoshi's Island, using some of the 3DS's features, such as 3D effects, analog control, or camera support.

The Legend of Zelda was released to the Nintendo 3DS Virtual Console in September 2011, as a part of the Nintendo 3DS Ambassador program, and was later released to the Nintendo 3DS eShop on December 22 in Japan; in 2012, it was released in Europe on April 12 and on July 5 in North America. The version released to the Japanese 3DS Virtual Console was the cartridge version. The game was released on the Nintendo Classics service on September 18, 2018. A special "Living the life of luxury!" edition of the game, which grants players all equipment and extra items at the start of the game, was later added to the service on October 10. In November 2021, Nintendo released a Legend of Zelda edition of the Game & Watch console, similar to the rereleased Super Mario Bros. Game & Watch. This version includes the original Legend of Zelda, as well as Zelda II: Adventure of Link, and the Game Boy version of Link's Awakening. The Zelda Game & Watch also includes a modified version of the Game and Watch original, Vermin, with Link replacing Mr. Game and Watch.

== Reception ==
Contemporary reception

Review scores
| Publication | Score |
|---|---|
| ACE | 905/1000 |
| Computer and Video Games | 9/10 |
| Computer Entertainer | , |
| Famicom Hisshoubon | 4.5/5, 5/5, 5/5 (Note: Each of the three reviewers in Famicom Hisshoubon ranked the game on a 5 point scale) |

Awards
| Publication | Award |
|---|---|
| Famitsu Best Hit Game Awards (1986) | Best BGM; Game of the Year (3rd) |
| Computer Gaming World (1988) | Best Adventure |

The Legend of Zelda received highly positive reviews from critics and was a best-seller for Nintendo. Upon release in Japan, it sold 1 million copies on its first day of release, and sold a total of 1.69 million for the Famicom Disk System (FDS) in Japan. In North America, the game was highly anticipated and topped the video game charts upon release. It became the first NES game to sell over 1 million cartridges in the United States during 1987, increasing to more than 2 million cartridges sold by 1988. It went on to sell 3 million cartridges in the United States by 1990, and eventually 6.51 million copies worldwide.

In Japan, a reviewer in the magazine Bi-Weekly Famitsu was impressed with the audio, smooth graphics and easy to control characters, and concluded the game's popularity was in its design, while difficult at first, players who put in the effort would be rewarded. In Famicom Hisshoubon, all three reviewers complimented the game, with one writing that the large variety of weapons and many secrets and large map make the game never grow dull. The single negative comment related to its high price of 15,000 Japanese yen. The first Famitsu Best Hit Game Awards gave Zelda the award for best background music and listed it as the third best Game of the Year (just below Dragon Quest and Gradius).

Upon release in North America, Computer Entertainer called it an "excellent" adventure game that exceeded expectations and said it had "more to offer than the typical hack-and-slash" epics, with "monsters to fight, secret doors to discover, and plenty of frustration" rewarded with new treasures, weapons, experience, places and discoveries. The review also praised the "very appealing" and "beautiful, fairy-tale" quality, the battery backup save feature, the "charming graphics, superb original music, excellent animation, and smooth transitions in scrolling between locations". They called it "an incredibly rich, deep gaming experience that goes far beyond the typical cartridge game" with appeal "to both male and female players" of all ages, making it a "must-have" for every Nintendo owner. Computer Gaming World in 1988 named the game as the best adventure of the year, stating that Zelda had been a "sensational success" in bringing elements of computer action-adventures to consoles. In 1990, the magazine implied that the game was a killer app, causing computer RPG players who had dismissed consoles as "mere arcade toys" to buy the NES.

Upon release in Europe, Tony Takoushi reviewed the game in British magazine Computer and Video Games and called it a massive arcade adventure packed full of dragons, imprisoned princesses, traps and pitfalls. They said it has "an enormous country to examine" with "dozens of things to collect" along with hidden power-ups and bonuses, while praising the "supreme" playability and the "excellent" graphics and sound; however, they criticized the "hefty" price tag of £39 or $69 (equivalent to $190 in 2025) in the United Kingdom. ACE magazine reviewed the game in 1989, calling it a "role-playing epic" that proves "consoles can be just as good at role-playing games as they are for arcade entertainment" while listing it as one of the top four best games available for the NES (along with Super Mario Bros., Mike Tyson's Punch-Out, and Super Mario Bros. 2). Zelda was reviewed in 1992 by Total! where it received a 78% rating due in great part to mediocre sub-scores for music and graphics. A 1993 review of the game was printed in American magazine Dragon #198 by Sandy Petersen in the "Eye of the Monitor" column, scoring the game 4 out of 5 stars.

It was reissued in 1992 as part of Nintendo's "Classic Series" and featured a grey cartridge. The game placed first in the player's poll "Top 30" in Nintendo Power's first issue and continued to dominate the list into the early 1990s. The Legend of Zelda was also voted by Nintendo Power readers as the "Best Challenge" in the Nintendo Power Awards '88. The magazine also listed it as the best Nintendo Entertainment System video game ever created, stating that it was fun despite its age and innovated on the genre. GamesRadar ranked it the third best NES game ever made. The staff praised its "mix of complexity, open world design, and timeless graphics".

Retrospective reception

Review scores
| Publication | Score | |
| Publication | NES | Wii |
|---|---|---|
| Dragon | 4/5 | |
| Eurogamer | | 4/5 |
| Famitsu | 8/10, 7/10, 8/10, 7/10 (FDS); 8/10, 6/10, 7/10, 6/10 | |
| GameSpot | | 7.2/10 |
| IGN | | 9/10 |
| Jeuxvideo.com | 19/20 | 19/20 |
| Nintendo Life | | 8/10 |
| RPGFan | 99% | 85% |
| Total! | 78% | |
| Video Games (DE) | 84% | |

Re-reviewing the FDS release in 1991, Hirokazu Hamamura complimented the games sound quality and said that the actions sequences were reasonably difficult. Another reviewer in the magazine said the game felt dated by early 1991, but no other similar game has surpassed it. On the games 1994 re-release in Japan cartridge, two reviewers in Famitsu called it a "masterpiece". Two reviewers cautioned that its graphics were not high quality by 1994 standards and that the sound quality is less than the original FDS version.

The Legend of Zelda has continued to receive critical acclaim from modern critics and remains well regarded. It is often featured in lists of games considered the greatest or most influential. In 1995, Flux ranked the game 2nd on its "Top 100 Video Games". It placed first in Game Informer's list of the "Top 100 Games of All Time" and "The Top 200 Games of All Time" (in 2001 and 2009 respectively), thirteenth in Electronic Gaming Monthly's 100th issue listing the "100 Best Games of All Time", fifth in Electronic Gaming Monthly's 200th issue listing "The Greatest 200 Videogames of Their Time", seventh in Nintendo Power's list of the 200 Best Nintendo Games Ever, 77th in Official Nintendo Magazine's 100 greatest Nintendo games of all time and 80th among IGN readers' "Top 99 Games". Zelda was inducted into GameSpy's Hall of Fame in August 2000 and voted by GameSpy's editors as the tenth best game of all time. Editors of the popular Japanese magazine Weekly Famitsu voted the game among the best on the Famicom. In 1997, Next Generation listed the North American release in their "Five Greatest Game Packages of All Time", citing the die-cut hole which revealed the gold cartridge, full color manual, and fold-out map. In 2016, The Strong National Museum of Play inducted The Legend of Zelda to its World Video Game Hall of Fame.

== Legacy ==
The Legend of Zelda is considered a spiritual forerunner of the modern action role-playing video game (RPG) genre. Though it is often not considered part of the genre since it lacked key RPG mechanics such as experience points, it had many features in common with RPGs and served as the template for the action role-playing game genre. The game's fantasy setting, musical style and action-adventure gameplay were adopted by many RPGs. Its commercial success helped lay the groundwork for involved, non-linear games in fantasy settings, such as those found in successful RPGs, including Crystalis, Soul Blazer, Square's Seiken Densetsu series, Alundra, and Brave Fencer Musashi. The popularity of the game also spawned several clones trying to emulate the game. Despite this, Miyamoto did not consider Zelda an RPG, but classified Zelda as "a real-time adventure game"; he said he was "not interested in systems where everything in the game is decided by stats and numbers" but what's "important to me is to preserve as much of that 'live' feeling as possible" which he said "action games are better suited in conveying" to players.

The Legend of Zelda spawned a solitary sequel, many prequels and spin-offs and is one of Nintendo's most popular series. It established important characters and environments of the Zelda universe, including Link, Princess Zelda, Ganon, Impa, and the Triforce as the power that binds Hyrule together.

An arcade system board, called the Triforce, was developed jointly by Namco, Sega, and Nintendo, with the first games appearing in 2002. The name "Triforce" is a reference to Nintendo's The Legend of Zelda series of games, and symbolized the three companies' involvement in the project.

GameSpot featured The Legend of Zelda as one of the 15 most influential games of all time, for being an early example of open world, nonlinear gameplay, and for its introduction of battery backup saving worldwide, to laying the foundations for later action-adventure games like Metroid and role-playing video games like Final Fantasy, while influencing most modern games in general. In 2009, Game Informer called The Legend of Zelda "no less than the greatest game of all time" on their list of "The Top 200 Games of All Time", saying that it was "ahead of its time by years if not decades".

In 2011, Nintendo celebrated the game's 25th anniversary in a similar vein to the Super Mario Bros. 25th anniversary celebration the previous year.

In 2026, a CGC 9.2 A+ graded Famicom Disk System copy of Zelda no Densetsu: The Hyrule Fantasy was sold for $32,000 at Heritage Auctions.

=== Sequels ===
There have also been a few substantially altered versions of the game that have been released as pseudo-sequels, and ura- or gaiden-versions. As part of a promotional advertisement campaign for their charumera (チャルメラ) noodles, Myojo Foods released a version of the original The Legend of Zelda in 1986, Zelda no Densetsu: Teikyō Charumera (ゼルダの伝説 提供 チャルメラ). It is one of the rarest video games available on the second-hand collector's market, and copies have sold for over US$1,000, despite the game being identical to that of the original release.

From August 6 to September 2, 1995, Nintendo, in collaboration with the St.GIGA satellite radio network, began broadcasts of a substantially different version of the original The Hyrule Fantasy: Legend of Zelda for a Super Famicom peripheral, the Satellaview—a satellite modem add-on. The game, BS Zelda no Densetsu (BS ゼルダの伝説), was released for download in four episodic, weekly installments which were rebroadcast at least four times between the game's 1995 premiere and January 1997. BS Zelda was the first Satellaview game to feature a "SoundLink" soundtrack—a streaming audio track through which, every few minutes, players were cautioned to listen carefully as a voice actor narrator, broadcasting live from the St.GIGA studio, would give them plot and gameplay clues.

Between December 30, 1995, and January 6, 1996, a second version of the game, BS Zelda no Densetsu MAP 2 (BS ゼルダの伝説ＭＡＰ２), was broadcast to the Satellaview as the functional equivalent of the original The Legend of Zelda's Second Quest. MAP 2 was rebroadcast only once, in March 1996.
