= Toshihiko Nakago =

Japanese video game programmer

- 中郷 俊彦
- Occupation: Video game programmer
- Years active: 1983–present
- Known for: Super Mario Bros., The Legend of Zelda
- Title: President of SRD

Toshihiko Nakago (Japanese: 中郷 俊彦, Hepburn: Nakagō Toshihiko) is a Japanese video game programmer and the president of Systems Research and Development (SRD), a programming studio that has worked on Nintendo titles for nearly four decades. He is best known as the lead programmer of the original Super Mario Bros. (1985) and The Legend of Zelda (1986) for the Nintendo Entertainment System.

== Career ==
SRD was founded in 1979 and initially specialised in computer-aided design (CAD) software. The studio began working with Nintendo in 1983, when it helped port the arcade game Donkey Kong to the company's Famicom/NES platform, drawing on its expertise with the 6502 microprocessor.

After working on the Donkey Kong ports, Nakago and SRD collaborated with designer Shigeru Miyamoto on Excitebike, their first original Famicom title. Nakago went on to serve as lead programmer for Super Mario Bros. and The Legend of Zelda, working alongside Miyamoto and Takashi Tezuka. Former Nintendo president Satoru Iwata described the three as a long-standing creative core within the company.

Over subsequent decades Nakago's role evolved from programmer to programming director, supervisor and adviser across numerous Mario and Zelda titles, while remaining president of SRD rather than a direct Nintendo employee.

On 1 April 2022, Nintendo acquired SRD, making it a wholly owned subsidiary; Nakago continued to lead the studio. SRD ultimately contributed to roughly one hundred Nintendo games, including most of The Legend of Zelda series and the Super Mario and Animal Crossing franchises.

== Selected works ==
Year	Title	Role
1983	Donkey Kong (NES)	Programmer
1984	Excitebike	Programmer
1985	Super Mario Bros.	Programmer
1986	The Legend of Zelda	Programmer
1990	Super Mario World	Programming director
1991	The Legend of Zelda: A Link to the Past	Programming director
2000	The Legend of Zelda: Majora's Mask	Programming director
2006	New Super Mario Bros.	Programming director
2011	The Legend of Zelda: Skyward Sword	Supervisor
2012	New Super Mario Bros. 2	Level design advisor
2012	New Super Mario Bros. U	Level design advisor
2013	The Legend of Zelda: A Link Between Worlds	Supervisor
2017	The Legend of Zelda: Breath of the Wild	Supervisor
2019	Super Mario Maker 2	Special advisor
2019	Ring Fit Adventure	Special advisor
2020	Animal Crossing: New Horizons	Associate producer
2023	Super Mario Bros. Wonder	Special level design adviser
