= Ada Howe Kent =

American artist and philanthropist

Ada Howe Kent (1858 – June 30, 1942) was an American artist and philanthropist. She was a mentee of James Abbott McNeill Whistler and worked with M. Louise Stowell. She was a member of the American Watercolor Society and the Rochester Art Club. Kent also had a large collection of Japanese prints.

== Biography ==
Ada Howe Kent was a student of James Abbott McNeill in Paris, and was also a student of Abbott Thayer and George de Forest Brush. She was an artist during the Arts and Crafts movement who worked closely with M. Louise Stowell and Harvey Ellis. Her watercolor was heavily influenced by Japanese prints, which she had a large collection of. Her art was said to have "mystical overtones and a symbolism that is reminiscent of the Pre-Raphaelites.” Kent worked with the Mechanics Institute to organize Arts and Crafts exhibitions. Kent was also an alum of the Livingston Park Seminary and an original member of the Rochester Tuesday Reading Club. She was a philanthropist who gifted Kent Hall to the Rochester Y.W.C.A in 1916. She was also part of the board of managers for Rochester State Industrial School.

== Exhibitions ==
Kent had multiple exhibitions in during her life. She exhibited at the National Academy of Design in 1890 and then in 1893. Kent also had exhibitions with the Boston Art Club in 1893, 1896 and 1905. Between 1896 and 1897, she had an exhibition in the Pennsylvania Academy of Fine Arts Annual Exhibition. She had another exhibition with the Pennsylvania Academy of Fine Arts in 1902. Kent also exhibited with the Art Institute of Chicago between 1900 and 1901 as well as 1905–1906.

== Art ==
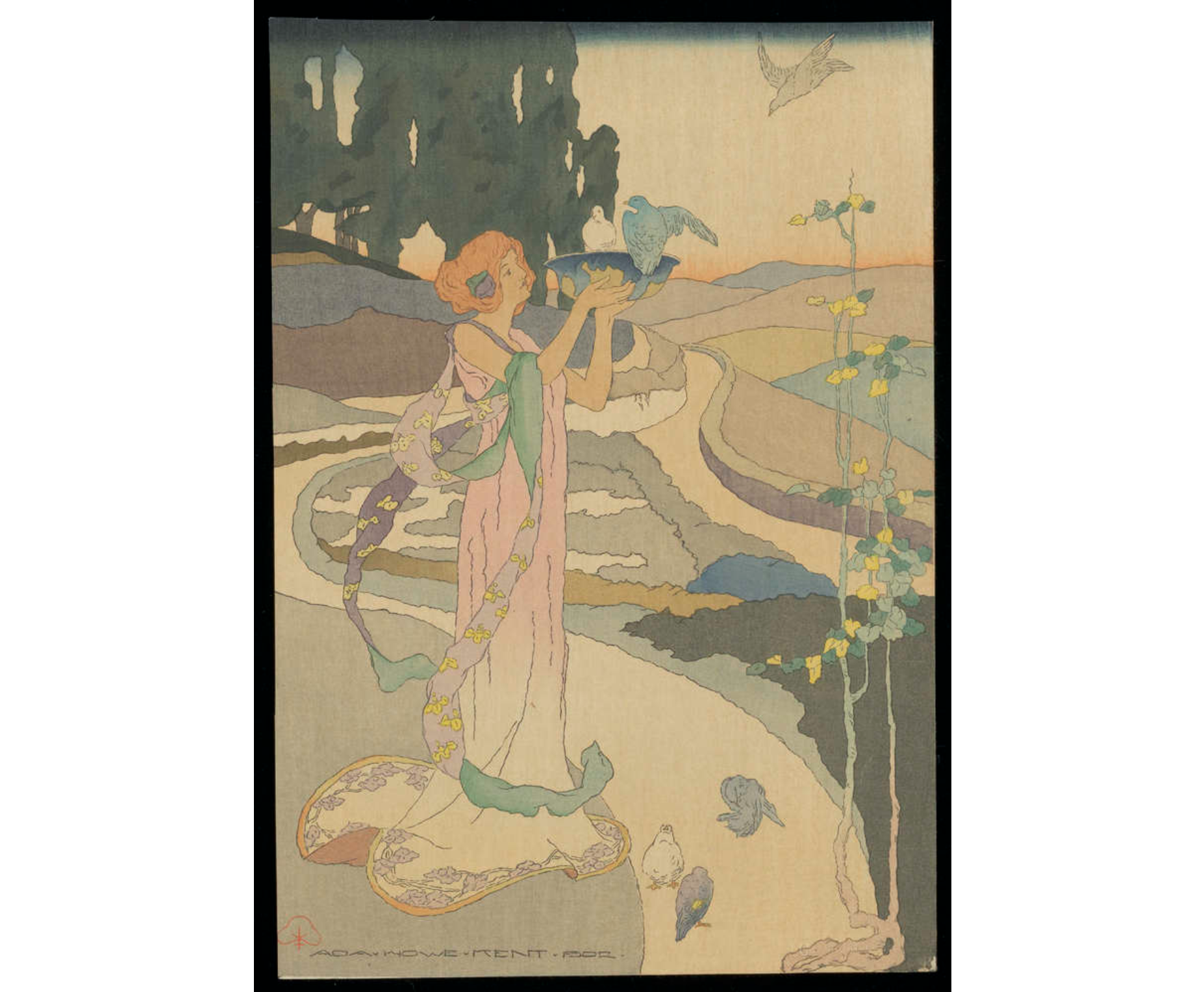
Woman Feeding Birds by Ada Howe Kent and M. Louise Stowell, 1902
