= World Video Game Hall of Fame =

International hall of fame

Coordinates: 43°09′09″N 77°36′06″W

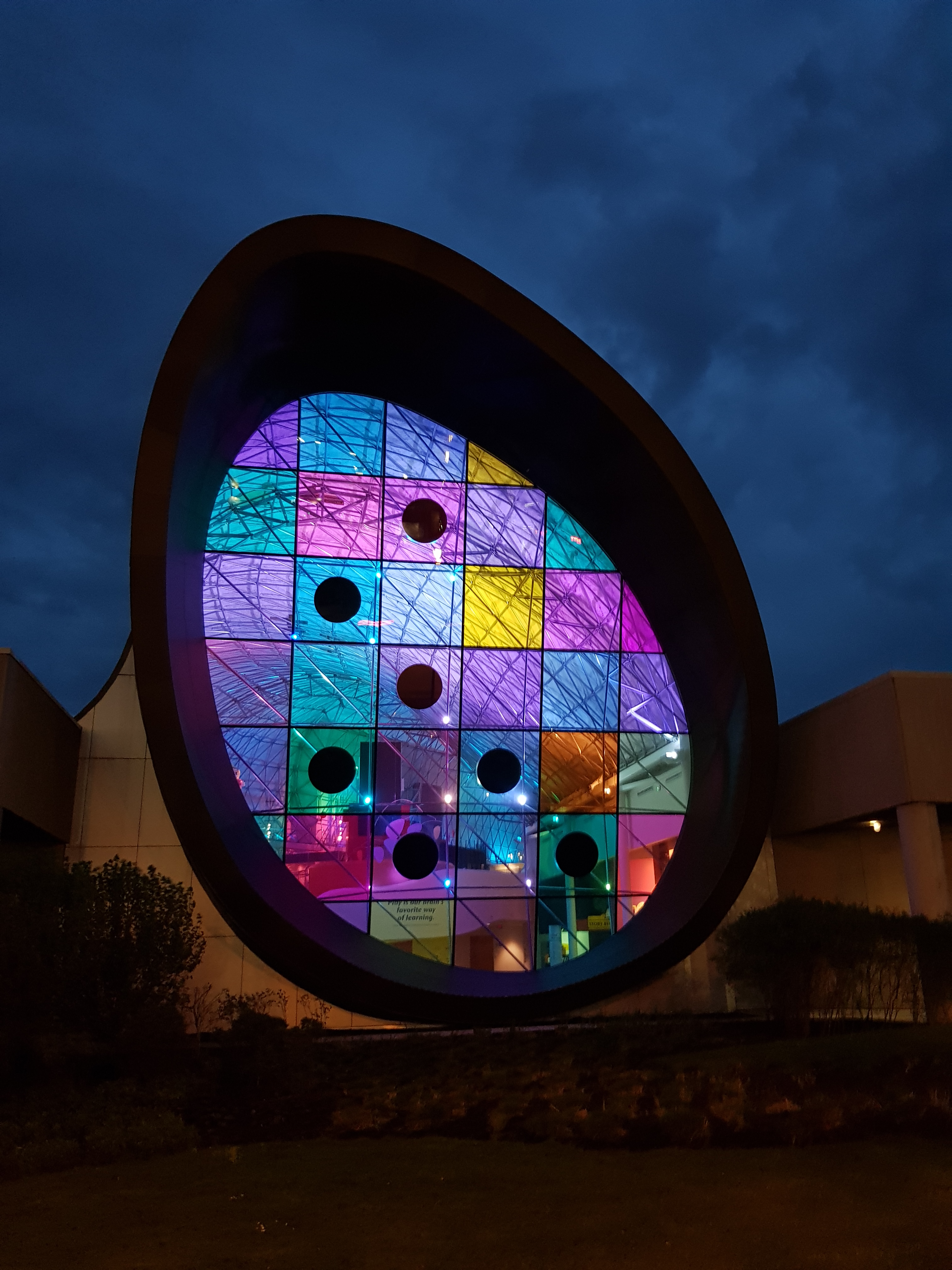
- The Strong National Museum of Play at night
- Formation: June 4, 2015
- Purpose: To highlight the video games that have made an impact on the world
- Location: Rochester, New York, U.S.
- Parent organization: The Strong
- Website: www.museumofplay.org/exhibits/world-video-game-hall-of-fame/

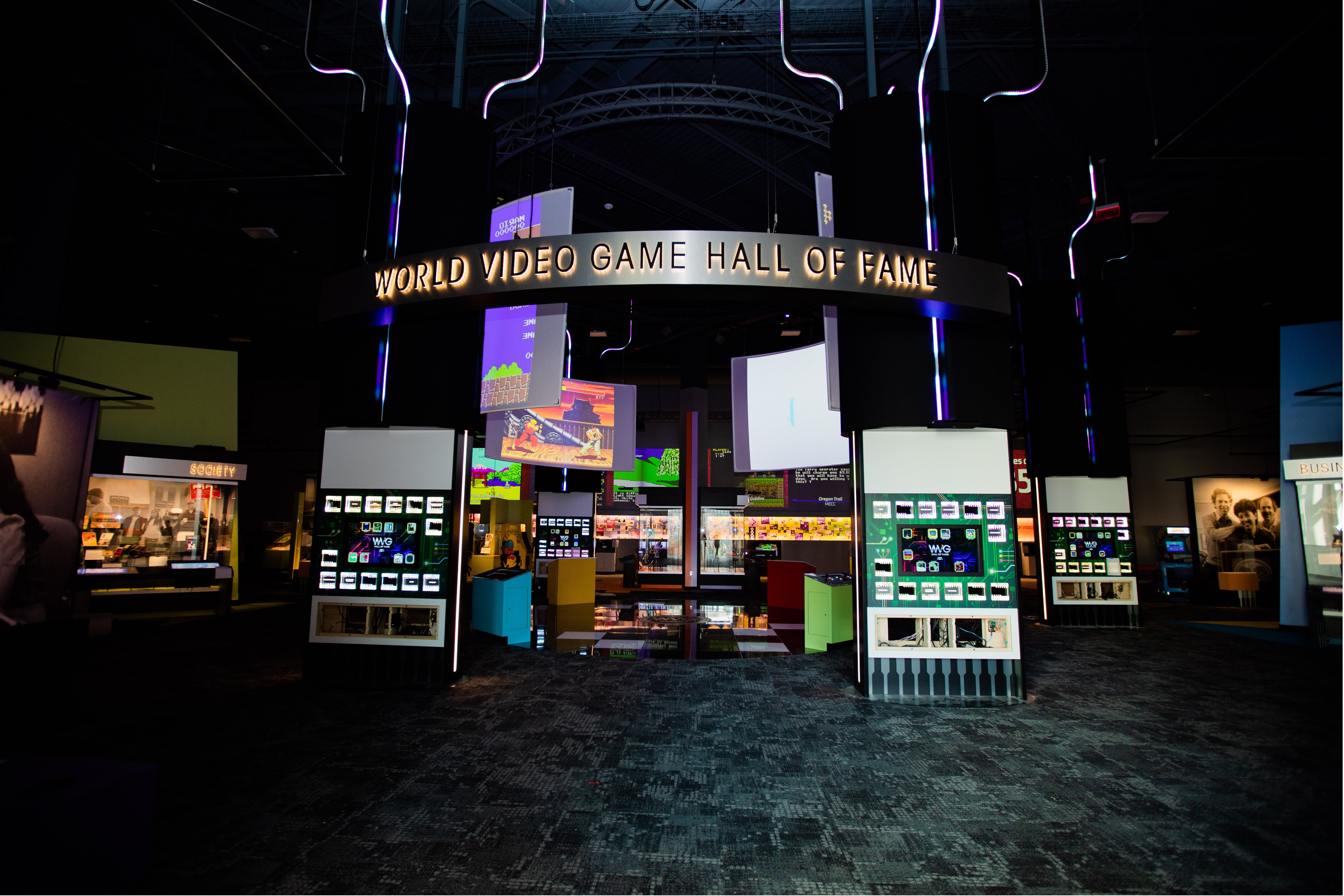
In June 2023, The Strong National Museum of Play debuted ESL Digital Worlds, a 24,000-square foot gallery that houses the World Video Game Hall of Fame.

The World Video Game Hall of Fame is an international hall of fame for video games. The hall's administration is overseen by The Strong's International Center for the History of Electronic Games, and is located at The Strong National Museum of Play in Rochester, New York, United States. The museum began the International Center for the History of Electronic Games in 2009, announced the formation of the hall of fame in February 2015, and opened it on June 4, 2015. It is located in a dedicated part of the "ESL Digital Worlds: High Score" exhibit at the National Museum of Play; prior to an expansion of the museum in 2023, it was located in the museum's "eGameRevolution" exhibit. The Strong has also run the National Toy Hall of Fame since 2002.

Video games become eligible for the World Video Game Hall of Fame by meeting four criteria:

- Icon Status – is widely recognized and remembered
- Longevity – is more than a passing fad and has enjoyed popularity over time
- Geographical Reach – meets the above criteria across international boundaries
- Influence – has exerted significant influence on the design and development of other games, on other forms of entertainment, or on popular culture and society in general

Initial nominations are made each year by a staff committee at The Strong, which takes into account the four criteria, with influence considered the most important. Members of the public can submit games for consideration by the committee as well. The nominees are then voted on by a panel of around 30 "scholars and journalists from around the world", with each panel member ranking their top three choices. A public poll is also included, with the results counting as equivalent to a member of the panel. For the 2026 nominees, a poll of attendees of the Game Developers Conference was also included. Afterwards, the staff committee reviews the votes and makes the final selection. While generally there is a clear difference in vote counts for the highest-scoring games, if there are multiple games with similar vote counts near the cutoff point, the committee decides by emphasizing a variety of game types or platforms in any given induction year. Video games that have not been inducted may be nominated in multiple years. The set of final nominees is typically announced each year in March, and the inductees in May. In its first two years of operation, the hall named six inductees from fifteen finalists; since then, it has named four or five inductees each year from a set of twelve.

In the 12 years that the hall of fame has been open, 53 games have been inducted out of 92 nominated. Many of those games have been nominated multiple times. In some cases, the hall may list the first game in a series of similar titles as a proxy for the entire series, such as with The Oregon Trail series or the FIFA International Soccer/FIFA series. Nintendo has been the developer of the most games inducted with seven, out of a total of eleven nominations of eight games. Atari has had three games inducted out of six nominations of those three games, and Blizzard Entertainment, Capcom, Konami, id Software, and Maxis have had two games inducted. Seven other developers have had more than one game nominated. Minecraft, FIFA International Soccer, and Angry Birds are tied for the most nominations at four, all of which were then inducted. Frogger, Guitar Hero, and NBA 2K are tied for the most nominations without being inducted at three. The earliest game to be nominated is Spacewar! from 1962, while the latest is The Last of Us from 2013, both of which have been inducted.

== Inductees and finalists ==
Release years of inductees
1962	Spacewar!
1963
1964
1965
1966
1967
1968
1969
1970
1971	Computer Space
1971	The Oregon Trail
1972	Pong
1973
1974
1975
1976	Colossal Cave Adventure
1977
1978	Space Invaders
1979	Asteroids
1980	Pac-Man
1981	Centipede
1981	Defender
1981	Donkey Kong
1981	Ultima
1982	Microsoft Flight Simulator
1982	Ms. Pac-Man
1983
1984	King's Quest
1985	Super Mario Bros.
1985	Tetris
1985	Where in the World Is Carmen Sandiego?
1986	Dragon Quest
1986	The Legend of Zelda
1987
1988
1989	SimCity
1990	John Madden Football
1990	Solitaire
1991	Sid Meier's Civilization
1991	Sonic the Hedgehog
1991	Street Fighter II
1992	Mortal Kombat
1992	Super Mario Kart
1993	Doom
1993	FIFA International Soccer
1993	Myst
1994
1995
1996	Barbie Fashion Designer
1996	Pokémon Red and Green
1996	Quake
1996	Resident Evil
1996	Tamagotchi
1996	Tomb Raider
1997	Final Fantasy VII
1997	GoldenEye 007
1998	Dance Dance Revolution
1998	The Legend of Zelda: Ocarina of Time
1998	StarCraft
1999	Silent Hill
2000	The Sims
2001	Animal Crossing
2001	Bejeweled
2001	Grand Theft Auto III
2001	Halo: Combat Evolved
2002
2003
2004	World of Warcraft
2005
2006	Wii Sports
2007
2008
2009	Angry Birds
2010
2011	Minecraft
2012
2013	The Last of Us

* Inductees

** Finalists that were inducted in a later year

Other finalists

Winners and nominees
Year	Game	Developer	Year released	Ref
2015	Doom*	id Software	1993	
2015	Pac-Man*	Namco	1980	
2015	Pong*	Atari	1972	
2015	Super Mario Bros.*	Nintendo	1985	
2015	Tetris*	Alexey Pajitnov	1985	
2015	World of Warcraft*	Blizzard Entertainment	2004	
2015	Angry Birds**	Rovio Entertainment	2009	
2015	FIFA International Soccer**	EA Canada	1993	
2015	The Legend of Zelda**	Nintendo	1986	
2015	Minecraft**	Mojang Studios	2011	
2015	The Oregon Trail**	Don Rawitsch, Bill Heinemann, and Paul Dillenberger	1971	
2015	Pokémon Red and Green**	Game Freak	1996	
2015	The Sims**	Maxis	2000	
2015	Sonic the Hedgehog**	Sonic Team	1991	
2015	Space Invaders**	Taito	1978	
2016	Grand Theft Auto III*	DMA Design	2001	
2016	The Legend of Zelda*	Nintendo	1986	
2016	The Oregon Trail*	Don Rawitsch, Bill Heinemann, and Paul Dillenberger	1971	
2016	The Sims*	Maxis	2000	
2016	Sonic the Hedgehog*	Sonic Team	1991	
2016	Space Invaders*	Taito	1978	
2016	Elite	David Braben, Ian Bell	1984	
2016	Final Fantasy	Square	1987	
2016	John Madden Football**	Park Place Productions	1990	
2016	Minecraft**	Mojang Studios	2011	
2016	Nürburgring	Reiner Foerst	1976	
2016	Pokémon Red and Green**	Game Freak	1996	
2016	Sid Meier's Civilization**	MicroProse	1991	
2016	Street Fighter II**	Capcom	1991	
2016	Tomb Raider**	Core Design	1996	
2017	Donkey Kong*	Nintendo	1981	
2017	Halo: Combat Evolved*	Bungie	2001	
2017	Pokémon Red and Green*	Game Freak	1996	
2017	Street Fighter II*	Capcom	1991	
2017	Final Fantasy VII**	Square	1997	
2017	Solitaire**	Wes Cherry (Microsoft)	1990	
2017	Mortal Kombat**	Midway Games	1992	
2017	Myst**	Cyan	1993	
2017	Portal	Valve Corporation	2007	
2017	Resident Evil**	Capcom	1996	
2017	Tomb Raider**	Core Design	1996	
2017	Wii Sports**	Nintendo	2006	
2018	Final Fantasy VII*	Square	1997	
2018	John Madden Football*	Park Place Productions	1990	
2018	Spacewar!*	Steve Russell and others	1962	
2018	Tomb Raider*	Core Design	1996	
2018	Asteroids**	Atari	1979	
2018	Call of Duty	Infinity Ward	2003	
2018	Dance Dance Revolution**	Konami	1998	
2018	Half-Life	Valve Corporation	1998	
2018	King's Quest**	Sierra On-Line	1984	
2018	Metroid	Nintendo	1986	
2018	Minecraft**	Mojang Studios	2011	
2018	Ms. Pac-Man**	General Computer Corporation	1982	
2019	Colossal Cave Adventure*	William Crowther, Don Woods	1976	
2019	Solitaire*	Wes Cherry (Microsoft)	1990	
2019	Mortal Kombat*	Midway Games	1992	
2019	Super Mario Kart*	Nintendo	1992	
2019	Candy Crush Saga	King	2012	
2019	Centipede**	Atari	1981	
2019	Dance Dance Revolution**	Konami	1998	
2019	Half-Life	Valve Corporation	1998	
2019	Myst**	Cyan	1993	
2019	NBA 2K	Visual Concepts	1999	
2019	Sid Meier's Civilization**	MicroProse	1991	
2019	Super Smash Bros. Melee	HAL Laboratory	2001	
2020	Bejeweled*	PopCap Games	2001	
2020	Centipede*	Atari	1981	
2020	King's Quest*	Sierra On-Line	1984	
2020	Minecraft*	Mojang Studios	2011	
2020	Frogger	Konami	1981	
2020	GoldenEye 007**	Rare	1997	
2020	Guitar Hero	Harmonix	2005	
2020	NBA Jam	Midway Games	1993	
2020	Nokia Snake	Nokia	1997	
2020	Super Smash Bros. Melee	HAL Laboratory	2001	
2020	Uncharted 2: Among Thieves	Naughty Dog	2009	
2020	Where in the World Is Carmen Sandiego?**	Broderbund	1985	
2021	Animal Crossing*	Nintendo	2001	
2021	Microsoft Flight Simulator*	Sublogic	1982	
2021	StarCraft*	Blizzard Entertainment	1998	
2021	Where in the World Is Carmen Sandiego?*	Broderbund	1985	
2021	Call of Duty	Infinity Ward	2003	
2021	FarmVille	Zynga	2009	
2021	FIFA International Soccer**	EA Canada	1993	
2021	Guitar Hero	Harmonix	2005	
2021	Mattel Football	Mattel	1977	
2021	Pole Position	Namco	1982	
2021	Portal	Valve Corporation	2007	
2021	Tron	Bally Midway	1982	
2022	Dance Dance Revolution*	Konami	1998	
2022	The Legend of Zelda: Ocarina of Time*	Nintendo	1998	
2022	Ms. Pac-Man*	General Computer Corporation	1982	
2022	Sid Meier's Civilization*	MicroProse	1991	
2022	Assassin's Creed	Ubisoft Montreal	2007	
2022	Candy Crush Saga	King	2012	
2022	Minesweeper	Curt Johnson (Microsoft)	1990	
2022	NBA Jam	Midway Games	1993	
2022	PaRappa the Rapper	NanaOn-Sha	1996	
2022	Resident Evil**	Capcom	1996	
2022	Rogue	A.I. Design	1980	
2022	Words with Friends	Zynga	2009	
2023	Barbie Fashion Designer*	Digital Domain	1996	
2023	Computer Space*	Syzygy Engineering	1971	
2023	The Last of Us*	Naughty Dog	2013	
2023	Wii Sports*	Nintendo	2006	
2023	Age of Empires	Ensemble Studios	1997	
2023	Angry Birds**	Rovio Entertainment	2009	
2023	Call of Duty 4: Modern Warfare	Infinity Ward	2007	
2023	FIFA International Soccer**	EA Canada	1993	
2023	GoldenEye 007**	Rare	1997	
2023	NBA 2K	Visual Concepts	1999	
2023	Quake**	id Software	1996	
2023	Wizardry	Sir-Tech	1981	
2024	Asteroids*	Atari	1979	
2024	Myst*	Cyan	1993	
2024	Resident Evil*	Capcom	1996	
2024	SimCity*	Maxis	1989	
2024	Ultima*	Richard Garriott, Origin Systems	1981	
2024	Elite	David Braben, Ian Bell	1984	
2024	Guitar Hero	Harmonix	2005	
2024	Metroid	Nintendo	1986	
2024	Neopets	Adam Powell, Donna Powell	1999	
2024	Tokimeki Memorial	Konami	1994	
2024	Tony Hawk's Pro Skater	Neversoft	1999	
2024	You Don't Know Jack	Jellyvision	1995	
2025	Defender*	Williams Electronics	1981	
2025	GoldenEye 007*	Rare	1997	
2025	Quake*	id Software	1996	
2025	Tamagotchi*	Bandai	1996	
2025	Age of Empires	Ensemble Studios	1997	
2025	Angry Birds**	Rovio Entertainment	2009	
2025	Call of Duty 4: Modern Warfare	Infinity Ward	2007	
2025	Frogger	Konami	1981	
2025	Golden Tee Golf	Incredible Technologies	1989	
2025	Harvest Moon	Amccus	1996	
2025	Mattel Football	Mattel	1977	
2025	NBA 2K	Visual Concepts	1999	
2026	Angry Birds*	Rovio Entertainment	2009	
2026	Dragon Quest*	Chunsoft	1986	
2026	FIFA International Soccer*	EA Canada	1993	
2026	Silent Hill*	Konami	1999	
2026	Frogger	Konami	1981	
2026	Galaga	Namco	1981	
2026	League of Legends	Riot Games	2009	
2026	Mega Man	Capcom	1987	
2026	PaRappa the Rapper	NanaOn-Sha	1996	
2026	RuneScape	Jagex	2001	
2026	The Elder Scrolls V: Skyrim	Bethesda Game Studios	2011	
2026	Tokimeki Memorial	Konami	1994	
