= M. Louise Stowell =

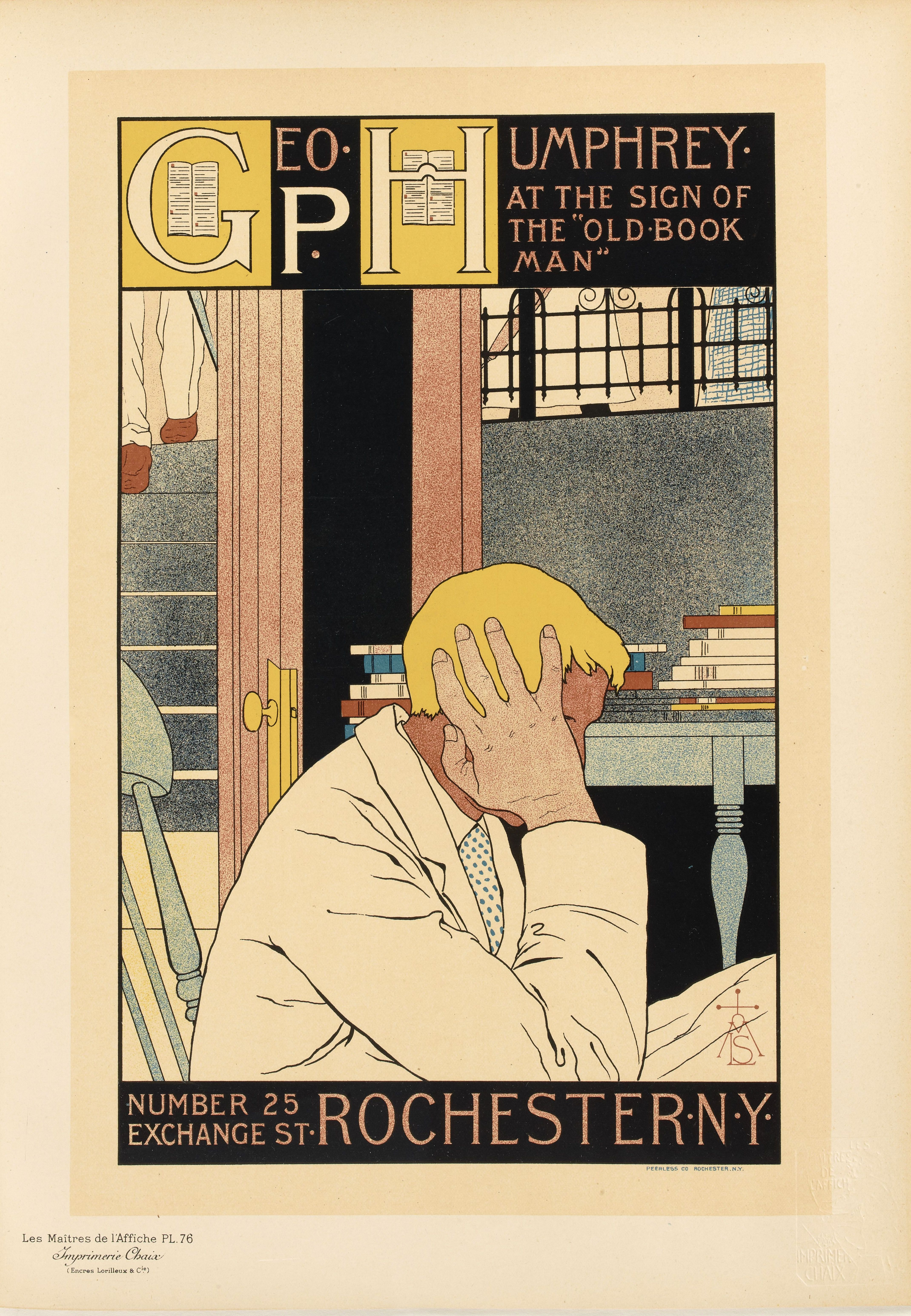
Poster by M. Louise Stowell, also published in Les Maîtres de l'Affiche

M. Louise Stowell, a Rochester, NY-based Arts & Crafts artist was born on June 16, 1861, in Hornell, NY, to Thomas Stowell (1819–1896)—a fire insurance adjuster and special agent for Aetna—and Henrietta Fowler (1820–1902). They moved to Rochester, NY in 1884.

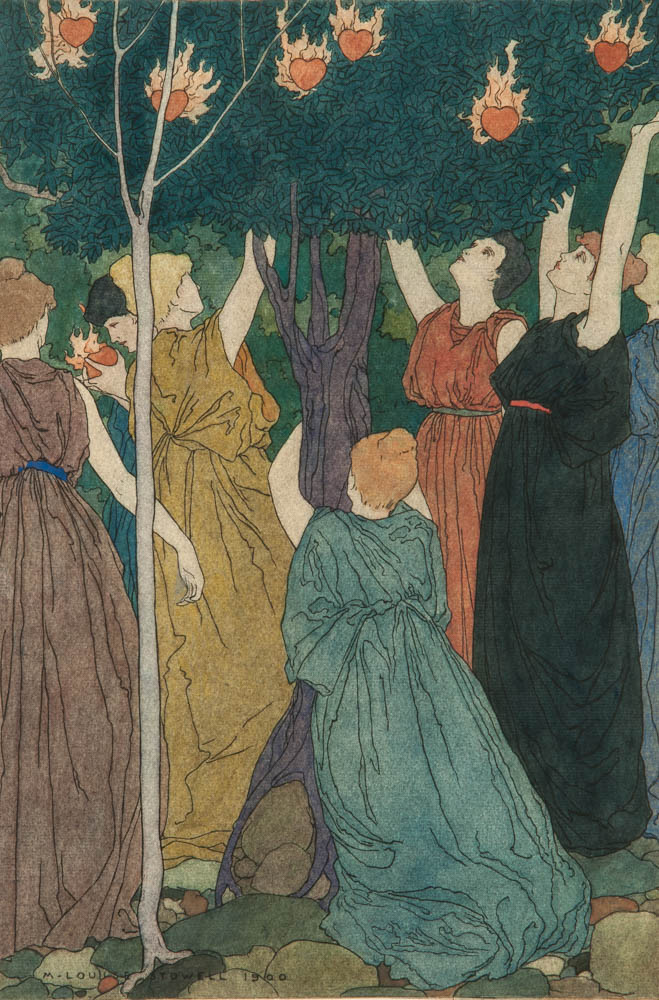
The Garden of The Hesperides, M. Louise Stowell, Memorial Art Gallery, Rochester, NY

M. Louise Stowell worked as a faculty member at the Rochester Mechanics Institute, known now as the Rochester Institute of Technology. From 1890 to 1892, she taught courses on drawing, composition, and "Saturday Classes".

From there, she moved to Massachusetts to study with Arthur Wesley Dow. Dow taught extensively on Japanese art and aesthetics, as well as watercolor painting; it is through his teachings that she found inspiration for her artistic style.

Stowell wrote “important” articles for The Craftsman magazine. “In October 1903… The Craftsman… published an article by Stowell entitled, “Japanese Prints and Some of Their Makers,” a comprehensive discussion of the aesthetics and techniques of Japanese art in which Stowell observed: “This art displays a respect for organic form, while not hesitating to sacrifice this for higher qualities of gracious line, well-disposed space and beautiful color which may be in separate patches and at variance with Occidental notions of veracity….”

Stowell then went on to further her studies of art at The Art Student League (before 1895), an art institute that was founded in 1875 in New York City, and considered to be the "birthplace" of American Art.

Returning to Rochester, she held a studio space in the Powers Building with Ada Howe Kent. Fully immersed in the Rochester Artist scene, M. Louise Stowell was a member of multiple organizations, including the Rochester Art Club, the American Watercolor Society, and the New York Watercolor Club. Stowell and other local artists, including Harvey Ellis, founded the Rochester Arts and Crafts Society and held the position of secretary.

“Women in the nineteenth century often were taught fancy needlework and other home crafts as part of the preparation for the roles they were expected to assume as adults. With the emergence of the Arts and Crafts movement, and its emphasis on handicrafts, women were provided an opportunity to exert an influence outside the home by participating in clubs, guilds, workshops, and exhibitions. Many improved their economic status by becoming professional craftsmen. … M. Louise Stowell… and countless other women across New York State figured prominently in both the theoretical and the practical aspects of the movement.”

Being known for her watercolors, posters, illustrations, etc., M. Louise Stowell passed on February 8, 1930, and resides in Mt. Hope Cemetery, Rochester, NY.
