= The Strong =

Museum of play located in Rochester, New York

Coordinates: 43.1525°N 77.6016°W

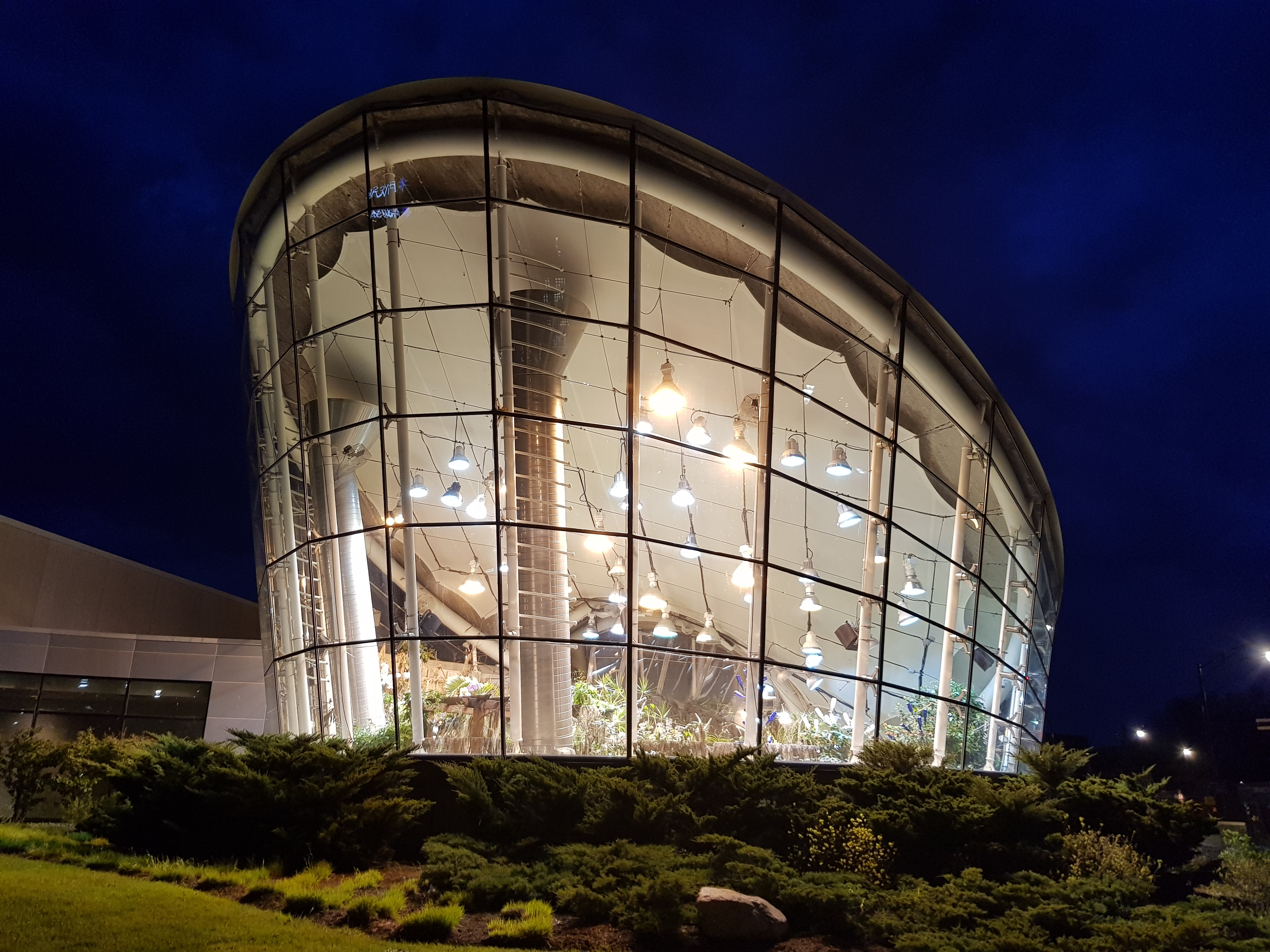
- Formation: 1968; 58 years ago
- Founder: Margaret Strong
- Type: Non-profit
- Purpose: Study of play
- Location: Rochester, NY, United States
- Region served: United States

The Strong is an interactive, collections-based educational institution in Rochester, New York, United States, devoted to the study and exploration of play. It carries out this mission through six programmatic arms called "Play Partners":

- The National Museum of Play
- National Toy Hall of Fame
- World Video Game Hall of Fame
- International Center for the History of Electronic Games
- The Brian Sutton-Smith Library and Archives of Play
- American Journal of Play
- The Woodbury School

The Strong is a not-for-profit organization that maintains historical materials related to play.

== History ==
The Strong was founded by Margaret Woodbury Strong in 1968 as the "Margaret Woodbury Strong Museum of Fascination." On her death the next year, the museum inherited her estate and collection of dolls, toys, and other everyday objects. It moved to a new building in downtown Rochester in 1982. Market research in the 1990s led it to pivot toward more family-oriented programming, and in 2002 it acquired the National Toy Hall of Fame, which it renamed the Strong National Museum of Play on 2006. The institution rebranded itself The Strong in 2010, housing The National Museum of Play and four additional Play Partners.

The Strong collects and preserves artifacts, documents, and other materials that illuminate the meaning and importance of play. The hundreds of thousands of objects in The Strong’s collections comprise the world’s most comprehensive assemblage of toys, games, dolls, electronic games, and other items related to play, many of which are on display in approximately 100,000 square feet (26,200m2) of exhibition space.

== Current exhibits ==
- Play Lab
- Skyline Climb
- Toy Halls of Fame
- Material Girl
- Millennial Madness: The Toys That Shaped a Generation
- Dancing Wings Butterfly Garden
- Wegmans Super Kids Market
- Reading Adventureland
- Play Pals
- Pinball Playfields
- Peanuts and Play Display
- One History Place
- Imagination Destination
- Game Time!
- Field of Play
- DanceLab
- Elaine Wilson Carousel
- Strong Express Train
- Can You Tell Me How to Get to Sesame Street?
- Build, Drive, Go
- The Berenstain Bears: Down a Sunny Dirt Road
- Aquariums at Rainbow Reef
- American Comic Book Heroes
- America at Play
- Academy of Interactive Arts and Sciences
- Raceway Arcade
- ESL Digital Worlds: Level Up
- ESL Digital Worlds: High Score
- Hasbro Board Game Place
- Re-Play: 50 Years of Hip-Hop Fun
- Play Happened Here
- Pixel Landing
- Age of Empires
- Jigsaw Puzzles: Order from Chaos
- Hasbro Game Park
- 100 Years of Madame Alexander
- Black Dolls
- Barbie: You Can Be Anything Experience
- Console Central
- Dungeons & Dragons: 50 Years of Storytelling
- Infinity Arcade
- Capturing Play
- Hasbro Board Game Place
- Playful Putters: The History of Miniature Golf
- Marble Speedway
- Hello Cutie: Our Favorite Kitty
- Grossology

== Former exhibits ==
- Kid to Kid
- UnEARTHling
- Between 2 Worlds
- Richard Scarry's Busytown
- Psychology: It's More Than You Think!
- Contraptions A to Z
- Arthur's World
- The Crayola FACTORY presents Journey to the Red Planet
- Pop-Up Culture: Reflections on the Electric Toaster
- Say Aah!
- TimeLab
- Altered States
- Memory and Mourning
- Earth 2U: Exploring Geography
- Kaleidoscope
- Toys from Mars
- Kid Stuff
- The Rochester Business Hall of Fame
- Making Radio Waves
- Geo-Zoooom!
- Face to Face: Dealing with Prejudice and Discrimination
- The Nobel Prize: Celebrating 100 Years of Creativity and Innovation
- Global Shoes
- Not Sold in Stores
- Sweet Shoppe
- Louie's
- Alice's Wonderland: A Most Curious Adventure
- Making Things Happen
- Lady Liberty
- The Berenstain Bears: The Art of Stan and Jan Berenstain
- Adventures with Clifford the Big Red Dog
- Enchanted Museum: Exploring the Science of Art
- Mister Rogers' Neighborhood
- Think Tank
- Discovery Garden
- Things for Play
- Art of the Garden
- Cyberchase—The Chase is On!
- Bob the Builder: Project: Build It!
- Grossology
- Curious George: Let's Get Curious!
- Make It & Take It
- Name the Newcomer Contest
- Child's Play
- Mr. Potato Head
- Videotopia
- America's Favorite Doll
- Mindbender Mansion
- Toys and More
- National Geographic MAPS
- Five Friends from Japan
- Football: The Exhibit
- Monopoly
- The Wizard of Oz
- Design Zone
- Doodle 4 Google
- Dora & Diego: Let's Explore
- LEGO Travel Adventure
- Boardwalk Arcade
- Atari Design
- Little Builders
- Animation featuring Cartoon Network
- LEGO Castle Adventure
- Play Pals
- Trivial Pursuit: A 50-State Adventure
- Cats Versus Dogs
- Joey & Johnny, the Ninjas
- Racers: The Thrill of Driving Game
- Go Greyhound Display
- Sid the Science Kid: The Super-Duper Exhibit
- Playing with Power
- Making Magic
- Perfectly Pez
- Hot Wheels: Race to Win
- Teenage Mutant Ninja Turtles: Secrets of the Sewer
- Thomas & Friends: Explore the Rails
- Muppets, Fraggles, and Beyond: The Jim Henson Collection
- Rockets, Robots, and Ray Guns
- The Force at Play
- Dinosaurs: The Land of Fire and Ice
- Playing with Politics
- Big, Scary, and Extinct
- Hands-On-Harley-Davidson
- Wild Kratts: Ocean Adventure
- Dc Super Heroes™: Discover Your Superpowers
- Paw Patrol : Adventure Play
- Women in Games
- 100 Years of Madame Alexander
- War Toys: Ukraine
- Scooby-Doo!: Mansion Mayhem
- eGameRevolution
- Take Care with Peanuts
- Wallace & Gromit and Shaun the Sheep: Shear Genius

== Short-term exhibits ==
- Photovoz: Picturing Play
- Capturing Play
- Black Doll Designers
- Grossology: The (Impolite) Science of the Human Body
- Dollhouses Unveiled

== Woodbury School ==
Woodbury School at The Strong offers a preschool program for three- and four-year-old children and an early kindergarten program for four- and five-year-old children. Both programs are Reggio Emilia-inspired, and therefore responsive to the children's interests. This curriculum approach encourages teachers and students to work together to plan curriculum and create projects. Guided by teachers who facilitate their explorations, children delve deeply into topics that fascinate them and stimulate their learning.

== International Center for the History of Electronic Games ==
The International Center for the History of Electronic Games collects, studies, and interprets video games, other electronic games, and related materials and the ways in which electronic games are changing how people play, learn, and connect with each other, including across boundaries of geography and culture.

== National Toy Hall of Fame ==
The National Toy Hall of Fame recognizes toys that have demonstrated popularity over multiple generations and thereby gained national significance in the world of play and imagination. Each year it inducts honorees and showcases both new and historic versions of the classic objects of play.

== World Video Game Hall of Fame ==
On June 4, 2015, The Strong opened the doors to its World Video Game Hall of Fame. Its curator is Jon-Paul C. Dyson, who is The Strong's Vice President for Exhibit Research and Development and the Director of the International Center for the History of Electronic Games.

The First Class of the World Video Game Hall of Fame consists of six games: Tetris, Super Mario Bros., Pac-Man, Doom, World of Warcraft and Pong.

The Second Class consists of an additional six games: Space Invaders, Grand Theft Auto III, The Oregon Trail, Sonic the Hedgehog, The Legend of Zelda and The Sims.

The Third Class includes Donkey Kong, Halo: Combat Evolved, Pokémon Red and Green and Street Fighter II.

The Fourth Class includes Final Fantasy VII, John Madden Football, Spacewar! and Tomb Raider.

Games become eligible for the World Video Game Hall of Fame by meeting four basic criteria. They must be iconic, have longevity, reach across international boundaries, and exert influence on the design and development of other games, other forms of entertainment, or popular culture and society.

== Brian Sutton-Smith Library and Archives of Play ==
The Brian Sutton-Smith Library and Archives of Play is a multidisciplinary research repository devoted to the intellectual, social, and cultural history of play. In addition to housing the personal library and papers of eminent play scholar Brian Sutton-Smith, it holds a spectrum of primary and secondary resources, including scholarly works, popular and children’s books, professional journals, other periodicals, trade catalogs, comics, manuscripts, game design materials, personal papers, and business records.

== American Journal of Play ==
The American Journal of Play is a peer-reviewed, interdisciplinary periodical for the discussion of the history, science and culture of play. It includes articles, interviews, and book reviews for a broad readership, including educators, scholars and designers.
