= International Center for the History of Electronic Games =

Museum in Rochester, New York, US

International Center for the History of Electronic Games (ICHEG)
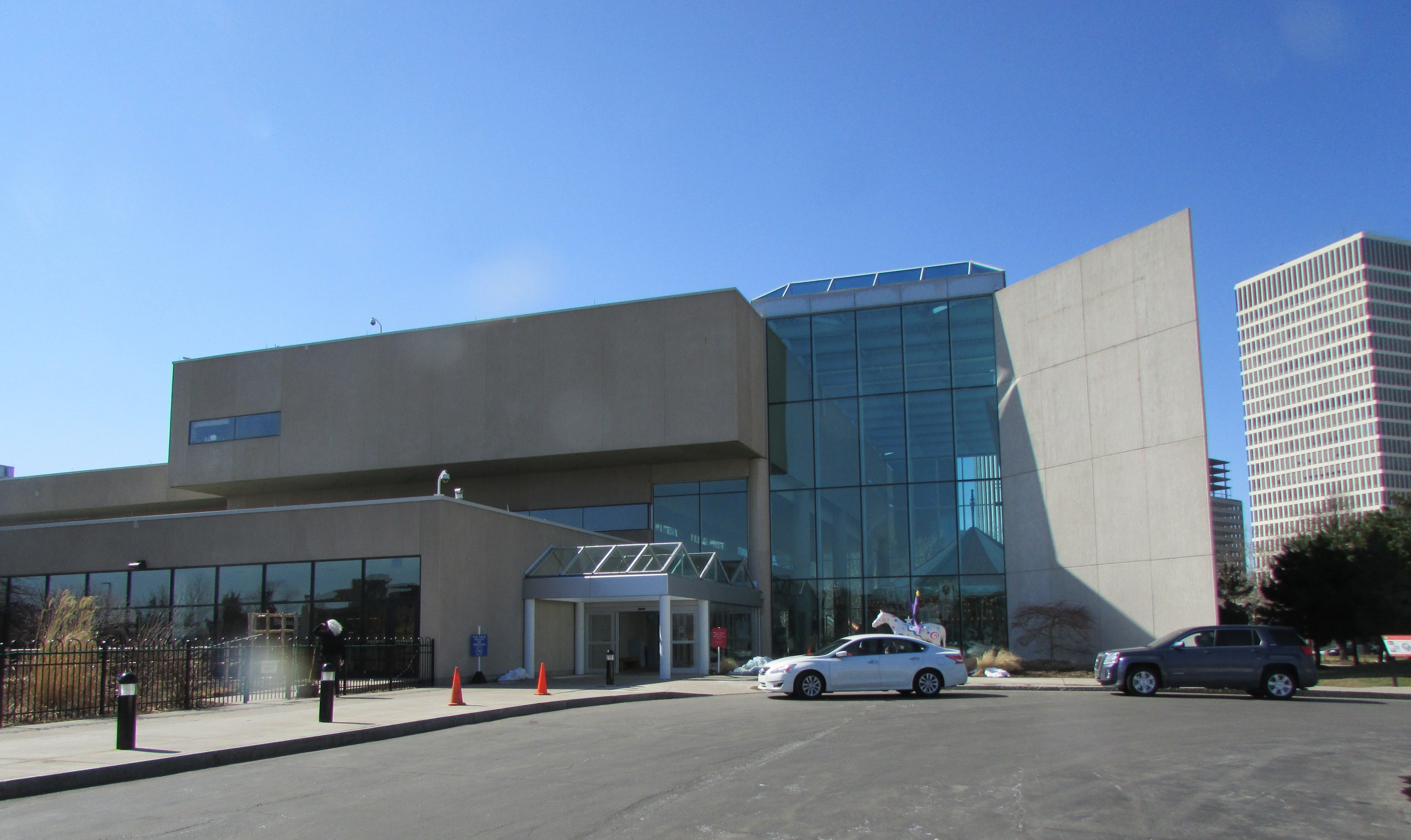
- Entrance to The Strong where the center is located.
- Purpose: Collects, studies, and interprets video games, other electronic games, and related materials and the ways in which electronic games are changing how people play, learn, and connect with each other.
- Location: Rochester, New York, USA,
- Parent organization: The Strong
- Website: www.museumofplay.org/collections/icheg/
- Formerly called: National Center for the History of Electronic Games

The International Center for the History of Electronic Games (ICHEG) collects, studies, and interprets video games, other electronic games, and related materials and the ways in which electronic games are changing how people play, learn, and connect with each other, including across boundaries of culture and geography. Located at The Strong in Rochester, New York, United States, it houses one of the world's largest, most comprehensive collections of electronic game platforms, games, and related materials, with more than 37,000 items.

== History ==
Originally created as a national center, the International Center for the History of Electronic Games changed its name in March 2010 to more accurately reflect the global impact of electronic games on society and culture.

In December 2013 the ICHEG received a donation of several SSI video games, for instance Computer Bismarck, notable for including the source code for preservation. In 2014 a collection of Broderbund games and a "virtually complete" Atari arcade machine source code and assets collection was added.

The International Center for the History of Electronic Games oversaw the opening of the World Video Game Hall of Fame on June 4, 2015.

== Collections ==
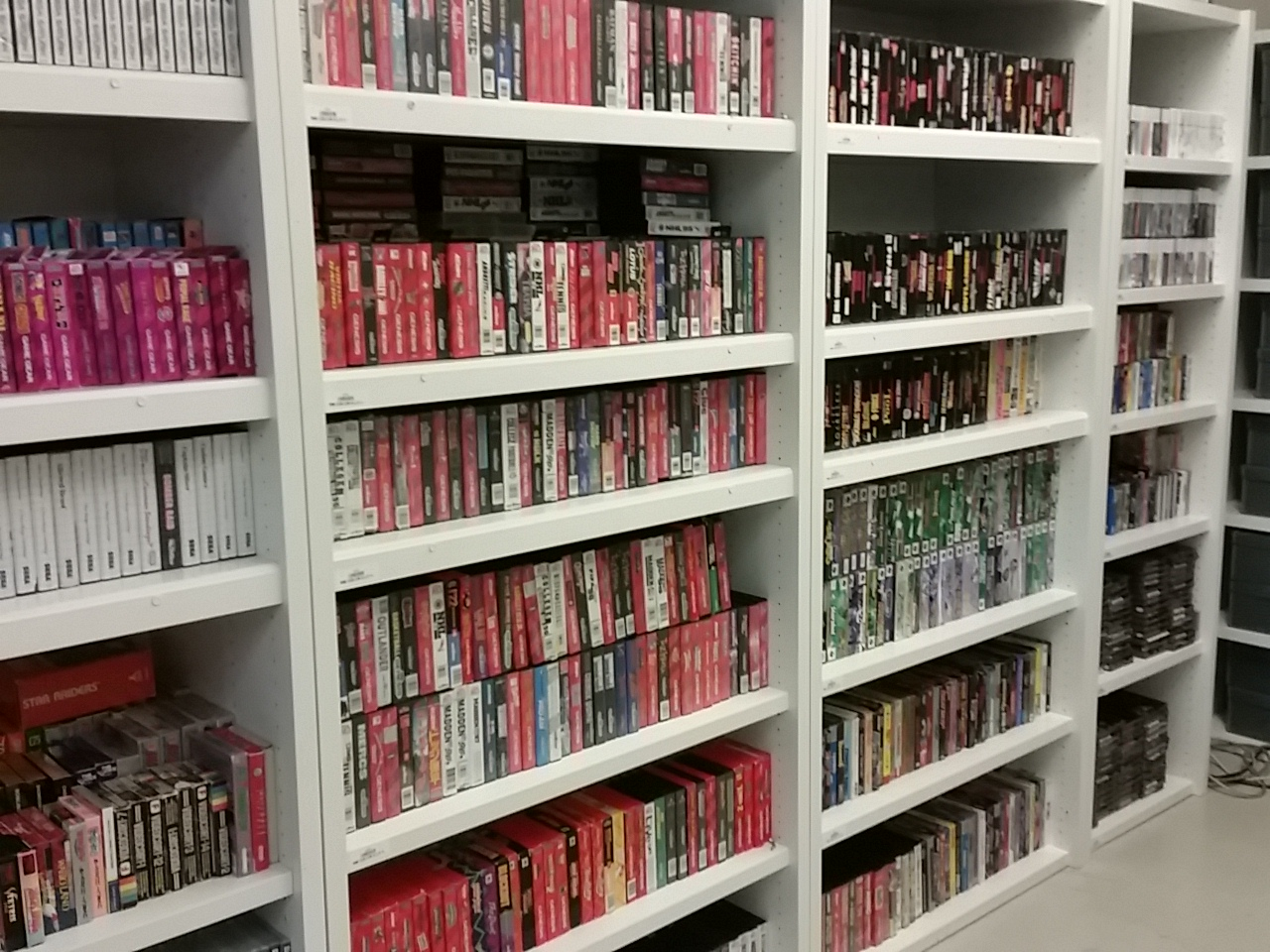
From the collections at ICHEG.

ICHEG defines electronic games broadly to include video games, computer games, console games, arcade games, handheld games, and toys that combine digital and traditional play. At more than 25,000 items and growing, the ICHEG collection is the largest and most comprehensive public collection of electronic games and game-related historical materials in the United States and one of the largest in the world. It is the only one anywhere that is linked directly with collections of more than 100,000 board and role-playing games, toys, and other artifacts of play that have inspired and informed the creation and development of electronic games. ICHEG is additionally supported by a research library of more than 130,000 volumes, including vintage comics and children's books and the largest collection of toy catalogs in the United States.

The collections include:

- Games
- Game platforms
- Packaging and advertising
- Publications
- Electronic-game-inspired consumer products
- Personal and business papers of key figures in the electronic-game industry
- Literary and popular inspirations of electronic-game imagery and content
- Electronic-game antecedents
- Associated artifacts and documents that represent or illustrate the impact of electronic games and people's lives

The ICHEG takes a five-pronged approach to video game preservation: Original Software and Hardware, Marketing Materials and Publications, Production Records, Play Capture, and finally the Source code.

== Interpretive activities ==
One exhibit featuring Atari and Apple computer games.

ICHEG develops exhibits and undertakes other activities to interpret the historical and cultural significance of electronic games to ensure that present and future generations can explore that history, understand how it began and evolved, and appreciate the impact that electronic games have on society. In fall 2010, ICHEG helped open eGameRevolution at The Strong. This 5,000-square-foot (460 m^{2}) exhibit allows guests to play their way through the history of video games.

== Access to collections ==
All the collections are accessible to researchers on site and thousands of artifacts may be viewed online. Many items are on view in The Strong's National Museum of Play displays and exhibits, where several are available for guests to play. Through grants from the Institute of Museum and Library Services, ICHEG is in the process of making all of its collections catalog available online. Many artifacts are already available to view.

== CHEGheads Blog ==
In a weekly blog, the CHEGheads—three experts from the International Center for the History of Electronic Games and their special guests—spotlight key and unusual artifacts from the ICHEG collections.

== Publications ==
The International Center for the History of Electronic Games supports the publication of articles and book reviews about electronic games in the American Journal of Play, an interdisciplinary scholarly quarterly of The Strong.

== Staff ==
Director: Jon-Paul C. Dyson, Ph.D.
Digital Games Curator: Andrew Borman
Electronic Games Curator: Lindsey Kurano
