= American Journal of Play =

- Discipline: Play, education, play therapy, recreation, leisure
- Language: English

Publication details
- History: 2008-present
- Publisher: The Strong (United States)
- Frequency: Quarterly
- Open access: Yes

Standard abbreviations
- ISO 4: Am. J. Play

Indexing
- ISSN: 1938-0399
- LCCN: 2008212529
- OCLC no.: 226081597

Links
- Journal homepage

The American Journal of Play is a peer-reviewed interdisciplinary academic journal that covers the history, science, and culture of play. The journal includes articles, interviews, and book reviews written for a broad readership of educators, scholars, designers, and others. It is published by The Strong and is available in print and free online.
