= The Strong National Museum of Play =

Part of The Strong in Rochester, New York, US

Coordinates: 43°09′09″N 77°36′06″W

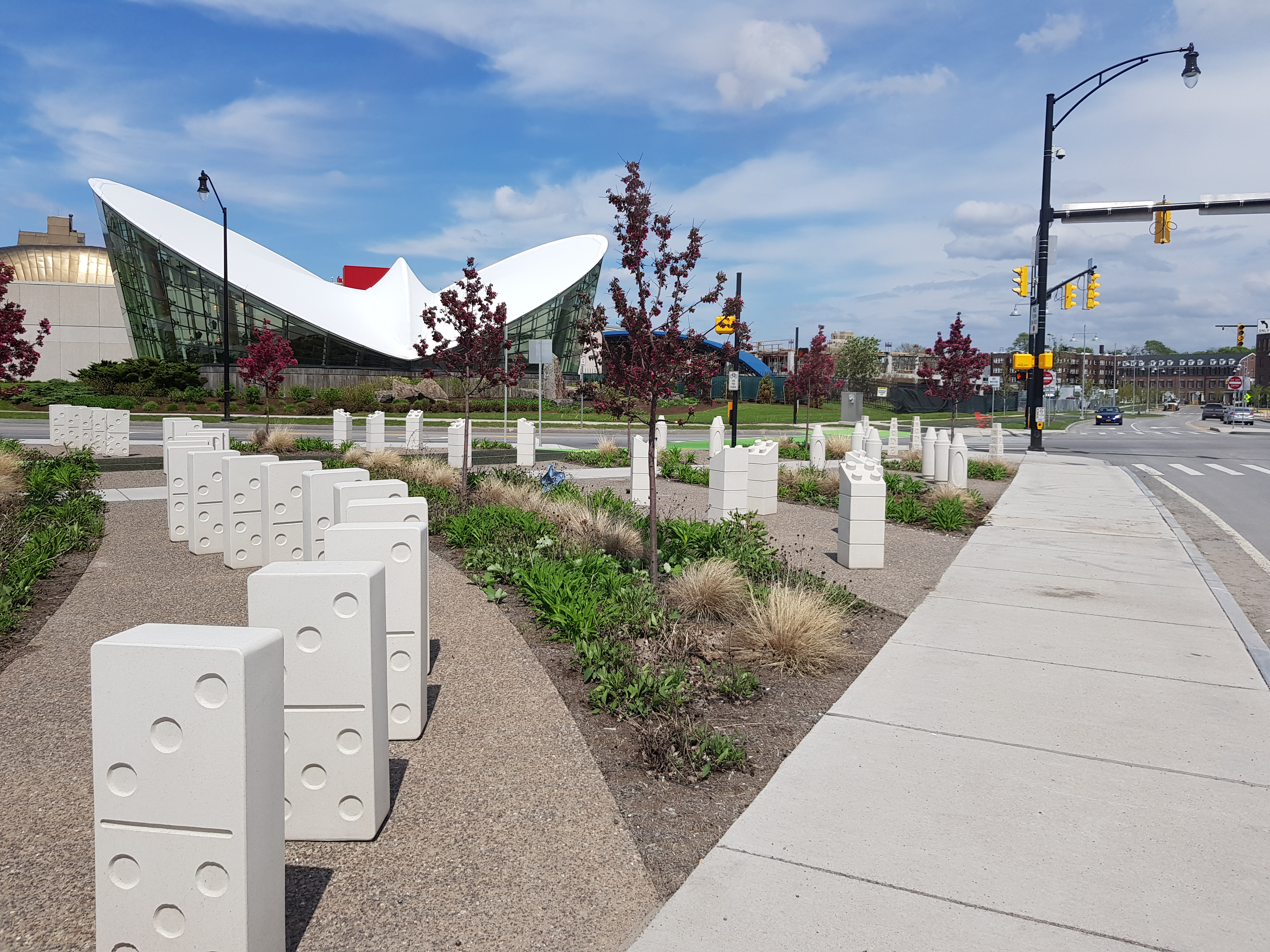
- The exterior of The Strong, featuring a piece of public art, showcasing four popular children's toys. From front to back: dominoes, interlocking bricks akin to those manufactured by LEGO, crayons, and toy blocks with the first five letters of the English alphabet
- Established: 1969; 57 years ago
- Location: Rochester, NY, USA
- Type: Children's museum
- Collections: Toys, video games
- Owner: The Strong
- Website: museumofplay.org

The Strong National Museum of Play (also known as just The Strong Museum or simply the Strong) is part of The Strong in Rochester, New York, United States. Established in 1969 and initially based on the personal collection of Rochester native Margaret Woodbury Strong, the museum opened to the public in 1982, after several years of planning, cataloguing, and exhibition development for the museum's new building in downtown Rochester.

For at least fifteen years after it opened, the mission of the museum was to interpret the social and cultural history of average Americans between 1830 and 1940, under the direction of H.J. Swinney and William T. Alderson. Strong's collections of dolls and toys, American and European decorative arts, prints, paintings, Japanese crafts, and advertising ephemera provided a firm foundation for this mission, and were supplemented with collections purchased and donated to more fully support the museum's early mission. The museum received considerable local and national publicity/support as well as substantial financial support from the National Endowment for the Humanities' Exhibitions and Public Programs division.

In the 1990s, the museum's Board of Trustees and director changed the museum's mission to collecting, preserving, and interpreting the history of play. Since then, it has refined and increased its collections (hundreds of thousands of items), and expanded thrice, in 1997, 2006, and 2023.

The museum is now one of six Play Partners of The Strong, which is also home to the National Toy Hall of Fame, the International Center for the History of Electronic Games, the World Video Game Hall of Fame, and the Brian Sutton-Smith Library and Archives of Play, and produces the American Journal of Play.

== About ==
Originally known as the "Margaret Woodbury Strong Museum" and later simply as the "Strong Museum", it became the "Strong National Museum of Play" in 2006, after completing renovations and an expansion that nearly doubled its size to 282,000 square feet (26,200 m^{2}).

The National Museum of Play is the only collections-based museum anywhere devoted solely to the study of play, and although it is a history museum, it has the interactive characteristics of a children's museum, making it the second largest museum of that type in the United States. The museum includes exhibits that interpret the key elements of play, as well as allow guests to explore the worlds of Sesame Street, The Berenstain Bears, Reading Adventureland, and the Dancing Wings Butterfly Garden.

=== Exhibits ===
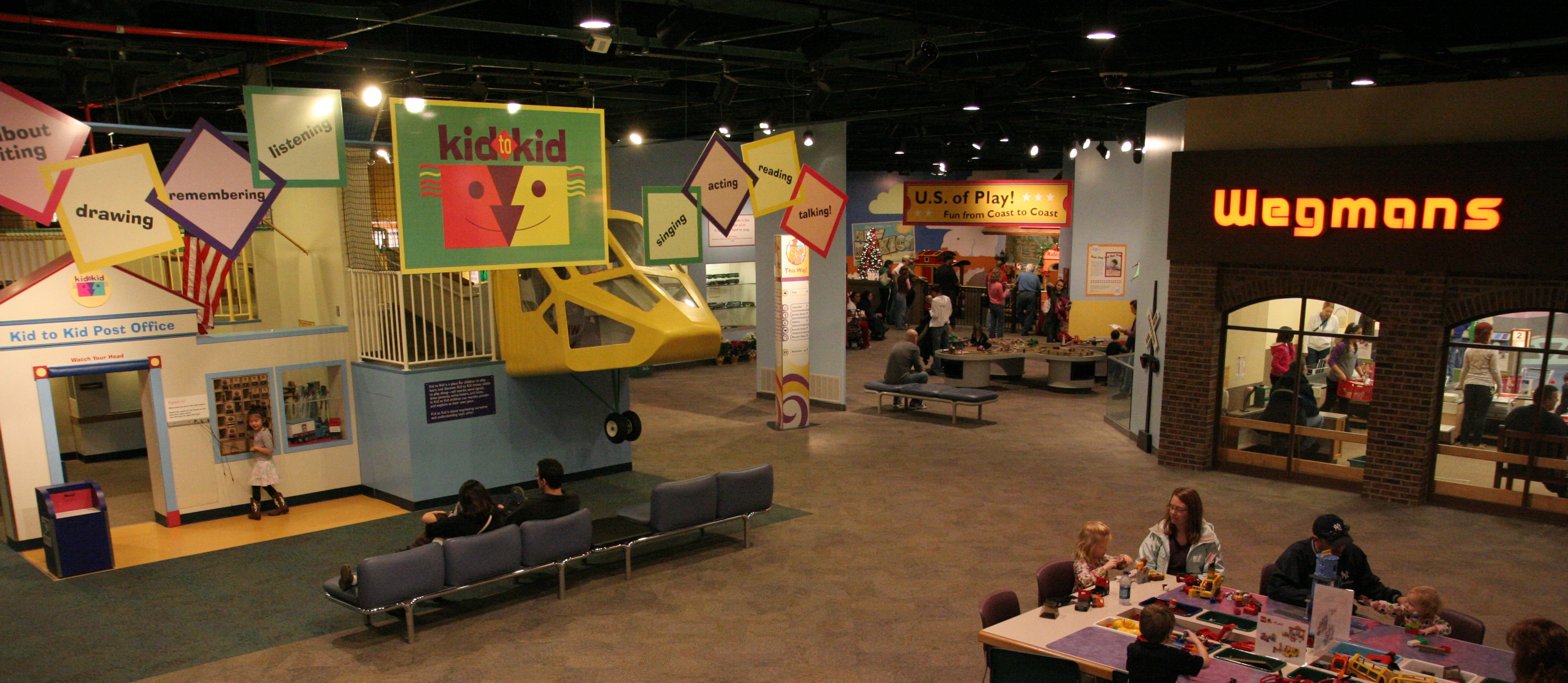
One area of the museum

The museum's exhibits are immersively themed to video games, storybooks, television shows, education, nature, history, comic books, carousel and train rides, and children's lifestyles. eGameRevolution is the first permanent video game exhibit in the US and includes the World Video Game Hall of Fame. The National Toy Hall of Fame is at the museum. Dancing Wings Butterfly Garden features thousands of butterflies, and is the largest indoor butterfly garden in New York. The Berenstain Bears: Down a Sunny Dirt Road is an original, permanent exhibit produced in partnership with the Berenstain family.

In 2019, The Strong Museum received a US$700,000 grant from the National Endowment for the Humanities to develop an interactive exhibit space to show the influence of video games on culture, with plans to open in 2022. After delays, the expansions were unveiled in July 2023, which included the ESL Digital Worlds exhibit, a new space to house the World Video Game Hall of Fame, and the Hasbro Game Park, a large board game-themed outdoor space. The additions added 90,000 square feet (8,400 m^{2}) of space at a final cost of US$75,000,000.

==== War Toys: Ukraine ====
On 10 November 2023, the "War Toys: Ukraine" exhibit, highlighting Russian war crimes in the 2022 Russian invasion of Ukraine and ongoing Russo-Ukrainian War, was opened for the first time in The Strong Museum, as a part of a tour around museums in North America:

The Strong is honored to be the first museum to host the War Toys: Ukraine exhibition. This exhibit is a call to action, raising awareness about the lasting impact of armed conflict on the youngest among us. It will serve as a testament to the resilience of these children and a reminder that we must stand with them in solidarity.

— Steve Dubnik, president & CEO of The Strong

The exhibit remained open at The Strong until March 16, 2024.

== See also ==
- National Toy Hall of Fame
- Videotopia
