= Margaret Woodbury Strong =

American collector and philanthropist

Margaret Woodbury Strong (March 20, 1897 – July 16, 1969) was an American collector and philanthropist. Strong was an avid collector, especially of toys and her large collection formed the basis for the Strong National Museum of Play.

Margaret was the second and last child of John Charles Woodbury (1859 in Rochester, New York – 1937) and the former Alice Motley (the first sibling died at childbirth). Margaret traveled the world with her parents beginning around 1907 after her father retired and sold the business started by Margaret's grandfather, The Strong, Woodbury & Co. buggy whip manufacturer. This is when she began her doll collection.

She married Homer Strong, over twenty years her senior, in September 1920; as a wedding gift, her parents gave her a large share of stock in the Kodak corporation.

Margaret and Homer had a daughter, who died in 1946; Homer died in 1958.

Her passion was collecting dolls, doll houses, and toys. She added gallery wings and outbuildings to her estate, which she eventually termed a "Museum of Fascination". The grounds contained a town of dollhouses. In 1968, she received state approval for the establishment of a museum. At her death, her doll collection numbered 22,000 and was the cornerstone of a collection containing more than 300,000 items.

Her father left her nearly one million dollars when he died in 1937 and this fortune had grown in excess of $77 million by the time Margaret died in 1969. She is buried in the Mount Hope Cemetery, Rochester, New York. She was a major benefactor of the Episcopal Diocese of Rochester.
