= Dewing =

Dewing is a surname that may refer to the following people:

- Arthur S. Dewing (1880–1971), American professor, businessman and author
- Austin Dewing (born December 30, 1996), American United States Air Force officer and soccer player
- Edward Dewing (1823–1899), English cricketer and antiquarian
- Ely Bruce Dewing (1834–1902), American merchant and politician
- Jan Dewing (c.1961–2022), British nurse
- Maria Oakey Dewing (1845–1927) was an American painter
- Martha Dewing Woodward (1856–1950), American artist and art teacher
- Robert Dewing (1863–1934), English army officer and cricketer
- Thomas Dewing (1851–1938), American painter, husband of Maria
