= Rose Garden (Dewing) =

Oil painting

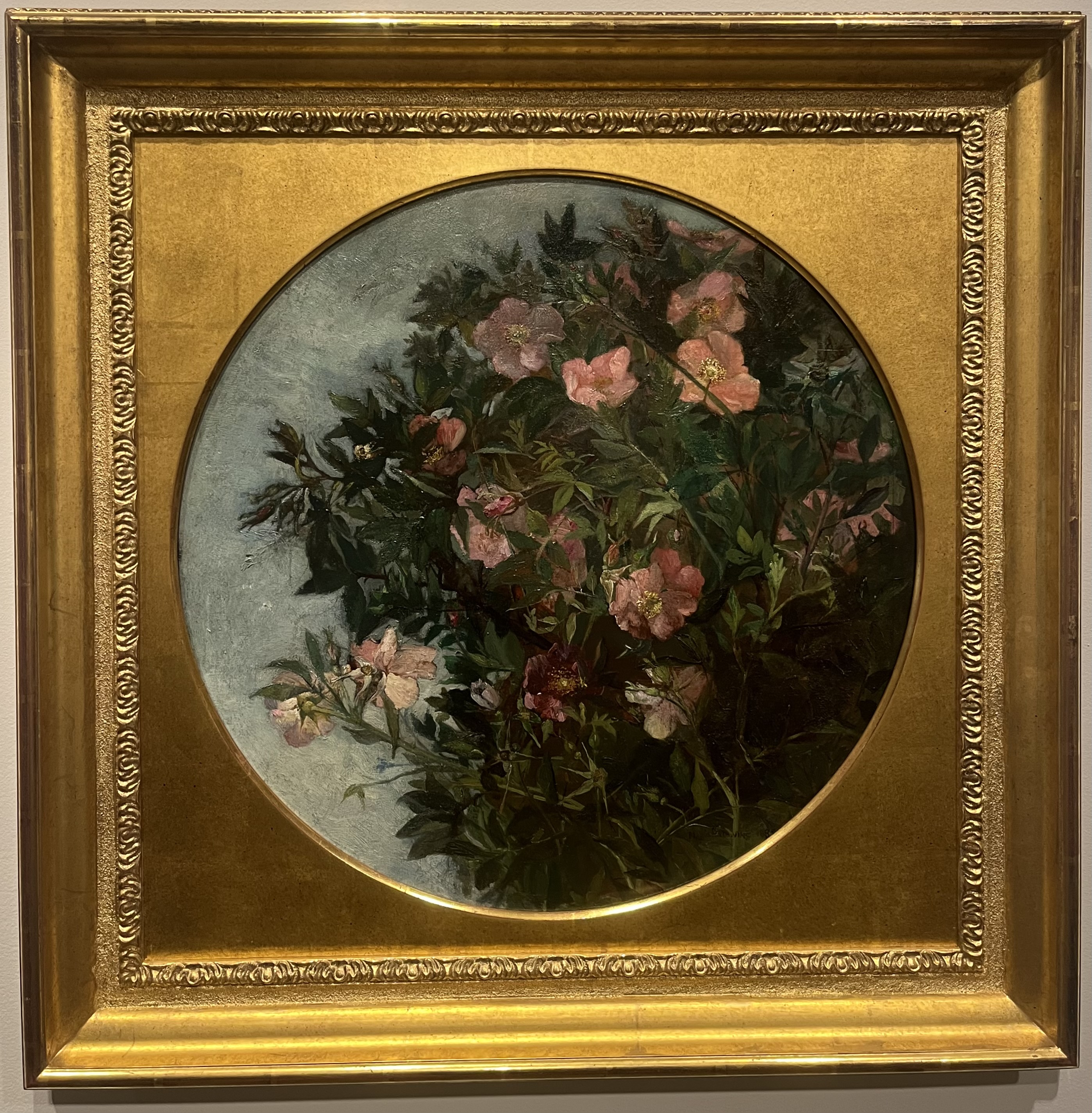
- Artist: Maria Oakey Dewing
- Year: 1882
- Medium: oil painting
- Dimensions: 22 1/8 x 21 3/4 in. (56.2 x 55.2 cm)
- Location: Memorial Art Gallery, University of Rochester, Rochester, NY
- Accession: 2024.8

Rose Garden is an oil painting of a wild rosebush completed in 1882. It was created by American artist Maria Oakey Dewing, and is currently on display in the permanent collection of the Memorial Art Gallery in Rochester, New York.

== Description ==
Rose Garden portrays a wild rosebush, painted in oil on a circular panel, with the dimensions 56.2 x 55.2 cm (22 1/2 x 21 3/4 in.). The painting was completed in 1882, and is done in impressionist style. It was likely created plein air in Dewing’s own garden, as she was an avid botanist, and many of her works were done outdoors.

The painting shows a close cropping of the bush, so that its leaves, stems and flowers are largely scaled on the panel. Yet the leaves and stems are small in relation to the flowers, whose petals billow throughout the bush. The bush spreads over a majority of the piece, covering the entire right side, and stretching nearly the entire height and width of the panel.

The rosebush is composed of wild, organic shapes which overlap with each other, while the bush itself eclipses over the cloudy blue-grey background. There is no horizon line or sense of perspective, but there is depth in the dense, overlapping layers of leaves. The disorderly forms of the bush are balanced by the placement of the roses, and the different levels of rendering in different areas. The leaves, stems and petals at the front of the bush are rendered quite sharply and precisely. Additionally, at the front of the bush the flora is light in value and bright in hue. Comparatively, the flora towards the sides and back of the bush are more abstract in style, their edges are softer, and they blend in more with each other and with the background. There is less rendering, and the flora is darker in value and less saturated. This guides the viewer's focus to the front of the piece.

== Background ==
Rose Garden shares its name with another more well known painting by Dewing, done in 1901, which is currently on display at the Crystal Bridges Museum of American Art. Little is known about the full scope of her works, as many of her paintings are held in private collections, or have disintegrated over time due to the use of low quality paints.

=== Artist ===
Maria Oakey Dewing was an American artist and author, most well known for her impressionist flower paintings. Dewing was part of the aesthetic movement at the time, which held the philosophy of “art for art's sake”. Pieces such as Rose Garden were created with the intention of beauty and decoration, rather than didacticism. She focused mainly on portraits and figure paintings at the start of her career, until shifting toward still life paintings following her marriage to Thomas Dewing in 1881.

She separated her works between figure paintings, flower paintings done in the studio and flower paintings done outdoors, as in her 1907 solo exhibition at the Pennsylvania Academy of the Fine Arts.

=== Artistic influences ===
Maria Oakey Dewing was quite original for her time, as she had a fairly abstract style, yet focused on scientific accuracy in her flower paintings. It was uncommon at the time to complete paintings outdoors, but she preferred to paint in her own garden, as she was a self taught botanist, and understood the functions and scientific terms of the flowers she painted. This made her distinct from other flower painters, especially impressionists, who focused on representing light and the flower’s form.

She uses various aspects of composition used in this piece, such as overlapping forms, abrupt cropping, and a single flower at the edge of the canvas, throughout much of her work.

She began her training at the Cooper Union School of Design for Women in 1866, and studied under John La Farge around 1875. Her use of bright highlights in the foreground to guide focus and create depth was likely taught to her by Thomas Couture, whom she studied under in France.

== Provenance ==
The painting was originally acquired by Arthur S. Dewing, the nephew of her husband Thomas Dewing, in 1906. It was then re-homed in private collections four more times in 1937, 1951, 1960 and 2023, until it was purchased by the Memorial Art Gallery in 2024. It is currently displayed in the “Seeing America” exhibit, as part of the Gallery’s permanent collection.
