= George B. Chambers =

British priest and activist (1881–1969)

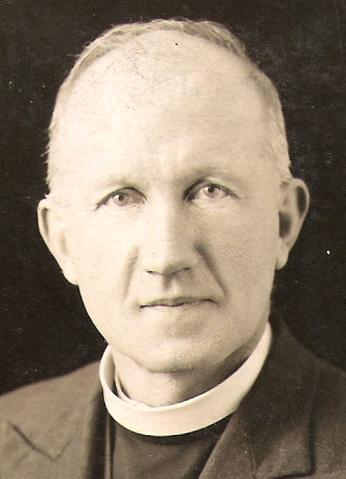
Chambers, c. 1940

George Bennet Chambers (18 January 1881 in Ealing, London – 1969 in Surrey) was an English priest, social activist and author (writing as G. B. Chambers). Following a long ministry in the Church of England, he became the vicar of Carbrooke Church in Norfolk. An expert on folk music (in particular, plainsong), he was also well known for his left-wing social and political views, which were evident in his well publicised commission of a crucifix incorporating hammer and sickle iconography.

== Early career ==
Chambers was the seventh child of George Nicholson Chambers and Margaret Bennet. His father was related to the former Chief Justice of Bengal, Sir Robert Chambers, and the family were originally from Northumberland before settling in London. Chambers spent some time in his youth as a Benedictine monk, based at Caldey Island in Pembrokeshire. After this, he took successive roles in the East End of London and South Africa working with the Church of England. He was ordained a deacon in 1906 and a priest in 1907.

He was appointed Vicar of Carbrooke Church in 1927, where he remained until 1955. Whilst at Carbrooke he also became Rector of Ovington, Norfolk, in 1952.

== Wider interests ==
Chambers was actively involved in fundraising for institutions that included the Imperial Cancer Research fund (now part of Cancer Research UK). A friend of several prominent left-wing figures in England, he was married in 1921 to Aline Robinson (daughter of Louis Robinson) and had four children.

== See also ==
- Christian left
- Gustav Holst
- H. G. Wells
- History of socialism in Great Britain
- Ralph Vaughan Williams
