= Panic of 1893 =

1893–97 financial crisis in the United States

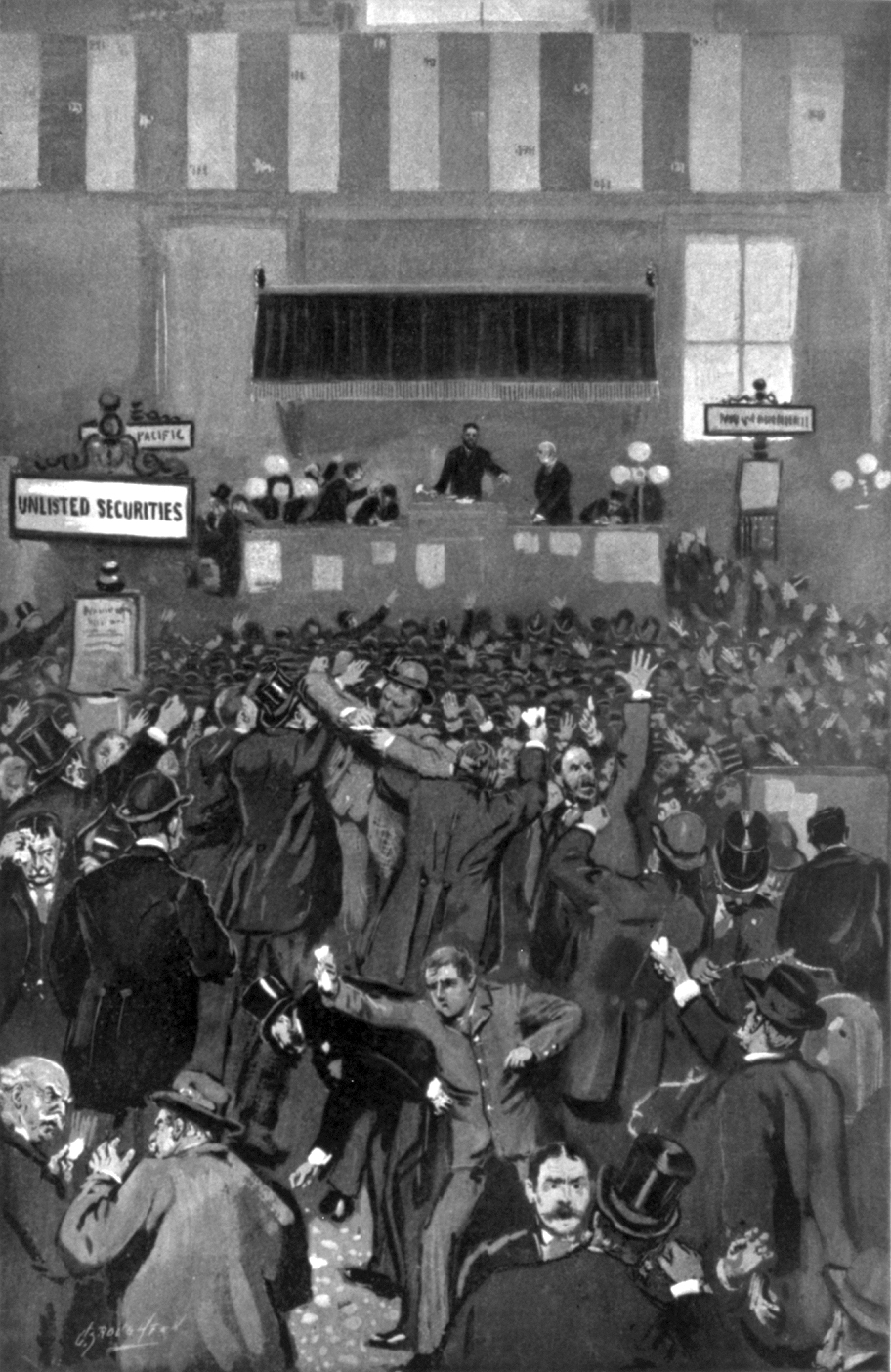
- Drawing in Frank Leslie's of panicked stockbrokers on May 9, 1893
- Date: May 1893 – November 1897; 129 years ago
- Location: United States
- Type: Economic depression / Financial crisis
- Cause: Reading Railroad bankruptcy, failure of the National Cordage Company, run on gold supplies, Free Silver movement, agricultural depression, railway overbuilding, European credit crunch
- Participants: Banks, railroads, American workforce, Cleveland administration
- Outcome: Over 15,000 business failures; collapse of 500+ banks; unemployment up to 17–19%; political realignment contributing to the 1896 victory of William McKinley; collapse of the Populist Party

The Panic of 1893 was an economic depression in the United States. It began in February 1893 and officially ended eight months later. The Panic of 1896 followed. It was the most serious economic depression in American history until the Great Depression of the 1930s. The Panic of 1893 deeply affected every sector of the economy and produced political upheaval that led to a political realignment and the presidency of William McKinley.

The panic climaxed with a run on gold from the United States Treasury. Unemployment rates in many states rose above 25%, and poverty became widespread.

== Causes ==
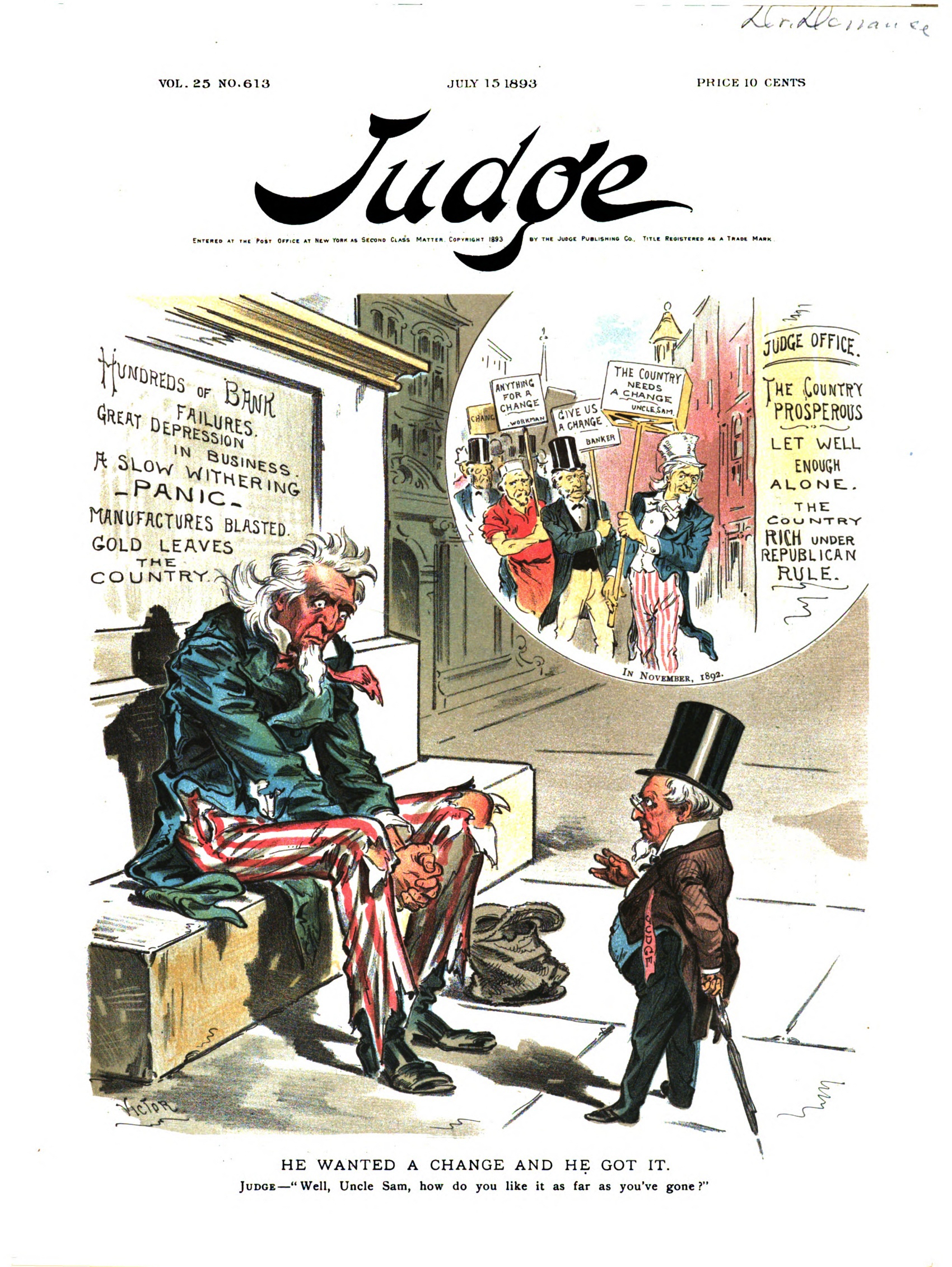
The pro-Republican Judge magazine blamed the Panic of 1893 on the Democratic victory in the 1892 election.

Causes of the panic include:

- Baring crisis—Heavy investment in Argentina by Barings Bank, followed by the 1890 wheat crop failure and the Revolution of the Park, a failed coup in Buenos Aires, ended further investments in the country.
- Australian banking crisis of 1893—Speculation in South African and Australian properties collapsed.
- Fear of contagion led to a run on gold in the United States Treasury. Bullion coins were considered more valuable than paper money; when people were uncertain about the future, the hoarding of coins was widespread and paper notes were rejected.
- During the 1880s, American railroads experienced what might today be called a "stock market bubble": investors flocked to railroads, and they were greatly overbuilt.
- The McKinley Tariff, enacted in 1890, raised tariffs as high as 50%.
- The economic policies of President Benjamin Harrison, including trade protectionism, veterans' pensions, and silver.

During the Gilded Age of the 1870s and 1880s, the United States had experienced economic growth and expansion, but much of this expansion depended on high international commodity prices, which were also affected by the McKinley Tariff of 1890. In particular, the opening of numerous mines in the western United States led to an oversupply of silver, leading to significant debate as to how much of the silver should be coined into money (see below).

One of the first signs of trouble came on 20 February 1893, twelve days before the inauguration of U.S. President Grover Cleveland, with the appointment of receivers for the Philadelphia and Reading Railroad, which had greatly overextended itself. Upon taking office, Cleveland dealt directly with the Treasury crisis and convinced the United States Congress to repeal the Sherman Silver Purchase Act, which he felt was mainly responsible for the economic crisis. Concurrently, in 1893, wheat prices crashed.

As concern for the state of the economy deepened, people rushed to withdraw their money from banks, and caused bank runs. The credit crunch rippled through the economy of the United States. A financial crisis in London combined with a drop in continental European trade caused foreign investors to sell American stocks to obtain American funds backed by gold.

== Populists ==
The People's Party, also known as the 'Populists', was an agrarian-populist political party in the United States. From 1892 to 1896, it played a major role as a left-wing force in American politics. It drew support from angry farmers in the West and South. It was highly critical of capitalism, especially banks and railroads, and allied itself with the labor movement.

Established in 1891 as a result of the Populist movement, the People's Party reached its height in the 1892 presidential election, when its ticket, consisting of James B. Weaver and James G. Field, won 8.5% of the popular vote and carried five states (Colorado, Idaho, Kansas, Nevada, and North Dakota), and the 1894 United States House of Representatives elections, when it won nine seats. Built on a coalition of poor, white cotton farmers in the South (especially North Carolina, Alabama, and Texas) and hard-pressed wheat farmers in the Plains States (especially Kansas and Nebraska), the Populists represented a radical form of agrarianism and hostility to elites, cities, banks, railroads, and gold.

== Silver ==
Unemployment rates during the 1890s (rates are per 100 persons)
Year	Lebergott	Romer
1890	4.0	4.0
1891	5.4	4.8
1892	3.0	3.7
1893	11.7	8.1
1894	18.4	12.3
1895	13.7	11.1
1896	14.5	12.0
1897	14.5	12.4
1898	12.4	11.6
1899	6.5	8.7
1900	5.0	5.0

The Free Silver movement arose from a synergy of farming and mining interests. Farmers sought to invigorate the economy and thereby end deflation, which was forcing them to repay loans with increasingly expensive dollars. Mining interests sought the right to turn silver directly into money without a central minting institution. The Sherman Silver Purchase Act of 1890, while falling short of the goals of the Free Silver movement, required the U.S. government to buy millions of ounces of silver above what was required by the 1878 Bland–Allison Act (driving up the price of silver and pleasing silver miners). People attempted to redeem silver notes for gold. Ultimately, the statutory limit for the minimum amount of gold in federal reserves was reached, and U.S. notes could no longer be redeemed for gold. Investments during the time of the panic were heavily financed through bond issues with high-interest payments. Rumors regarding financial distress at the National Cordage Company (NCC), then the most actively traded stock, caused its lenders to call in their loans immediately, and the company went into bankruptcy receivership as a result. The company, a rope manufacturer, had tried to corner the market for imported hemp. As demand for silver and silver notes fell, the price and value of silver dropped. Holders worried about a loss of face value of bonds, and many became worthless.

A series of bank failures followed, and the Northern Pacific Railway, the Union Pacific Railroad, and the Atchison, Topeka & Santa Fe Railroad failed. This was followed by the bankruptcy of many other companies; in total over 15,000 companies and 500 banks, many of them in the West, failed. According to high estimates, about 17%–19% of the workforce was unemployed at the panic's peak. The huge spike in unemployment, combined with the loss of life savings kept in failed banks, meant that a once-secure middle class could not meet their mortgage obligations. Many walked away from recently built homes as a result.

== Effects ==
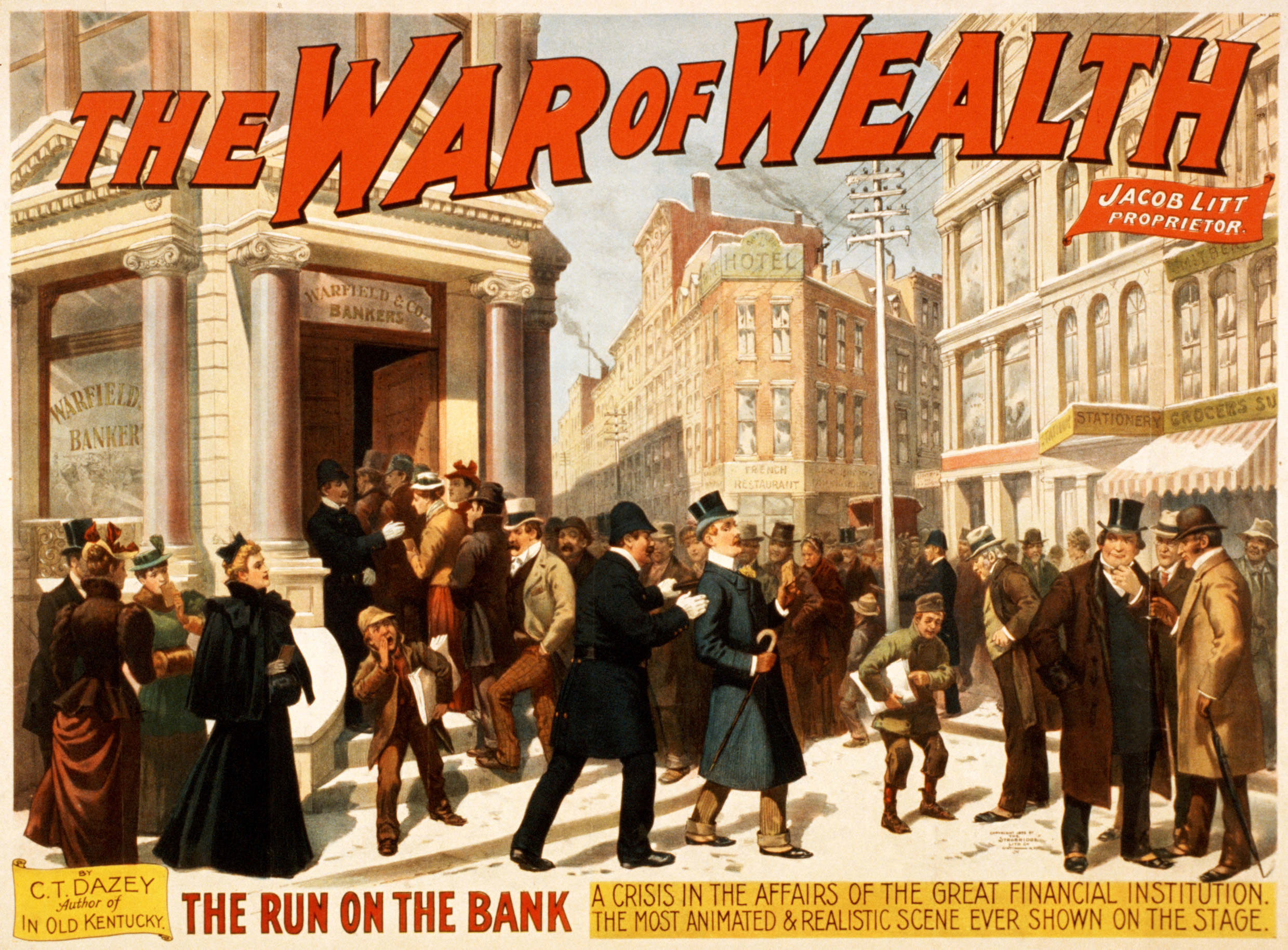
The 1896 Broadway melodrama The War of Wealth was inspired by the panic of 1893.

As part of the panic, on May 5, 1893, the Dow Jones Industrial Average fell 24% in a single day after the bankruptcy of National Cordage Company. Soon over 500 banks closed, 15,000 businesses failed, and numerous farms ceased operation. The unemployment rate reached 25% in Pennsylvania, 35% in New York, and 43% in Michigan. Soup kitchens were opened to help feed the destitute. Facing starvation, people chopped wood, broke rocks, and sewed by hand with needle and thread in exchange for food. In some cases, women resorted to prostitution to feed their families. To help the people of Detroit, Mayor Hazen S. Pingree launched his "Potato Patch Plan," which were community gardens for farming.

President Grover Cleveland was blamed for the depression. Gold reserves stored in the U.S. Treasury fell to a dangerously low level. This forced President Cleveland to borrow $65 million in gold from Wall Street banker J. P. Morgan and the Rothschild banking family of England, through what was known as the Morgan-Belmont Syndicate. President Cleveland's Democratic Party suffered enormous losses in the 1894 elections, largely being blamed for the downward spiral in the economy and the brutal crushing of the Pullman Strike. After their defeat in 1896, the Democrats did not regain control of any branch of the Federal Government until 1910.

=== Railroads ===
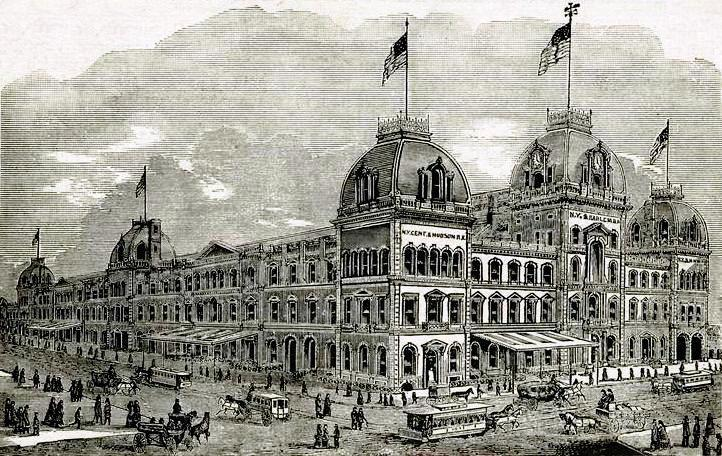
The Grand Central Depot in New York City was an important hub for rail transportation, a major part of the shipping industry in the late nineteenth century.

==== Fluctuations in railroad investment after the Panic of 1893 ====
The bad omen of investors switching from equity-based stocks to constant-return bonds in 1894 was mirrored in the corporate finance actions of railroads, which reduced their acquisition of rolling stock. Railroad expansion, including capital expenditures, rose again in 1895 but slowed in 1897 during another economic trough.

==== Receivership ====
In 1893, the total railroad mileage in the U.S. was 176,803.6 miles. In 1894 and 1895, railroads only expanded 4,196.4 miles, although 100,000 miles of rail were added from 1878 to 1896. In 1893, the year following the panic, one-fourth of all rail mileage went into receivership. The U.S. Census placed this value at close to $1.8 billion (not adjusted for inflation), the largest amount recorded between 1876 and 1910. This was over $1 billion (also not adjusted for inflation) more than the next largest amount, in 1884.

==== 1894 Pullman Strike ====
The great Pullman Strike shut down most rail traffic in the Northern states from May to July 1894. President Grover Cleveland got federal courts to order a stop. He sent the U.S. Army to protect the railroads against mob violence in many cities. The strike was launched by the new American Railway Union (ARU) under the leadership of Eugene V. Debs at the Pullman Company factory in Chicago after its owner refused to either lower rent in the company town or raise wages for its workers. To win, the union tried to stop all trains carrying Pullman passenger cars. The Pullman cars also carried the U.S. mail, which the federal government was obliged to protect. The strike failed, the ARU collapsed, and Debs went to prison.

=== American merchant tonnage ===
The maritime industry of the United States did not escape the effects of the Panic of 1893. The total gross registered merchant marine tonnage employed in "foreign and coastwise trade and in the fisheries," as measured by the U.S. Census between 1888 and 1893, grew at a rate of about 2.74%. In 1894, U.S. gross tonnage decreased by 2.9%, and again in 1895 by 1.03%.

==== Rates ====
In 1894, the rate for a bushel of wheat by rail dropped from 14.70¢ in 1893 to 12.88¢. This rate continued to decrease, reaching a terminal rate in 1901 of 9.92¢ and never reached 12 cents between 1898 and 1910.

Between 1893 and 1894, average shipping rates by lake or canal per wheat bushel decreased by almost 2 cents, from 6.33¢ to 4.44¢. Rates on the transatlantic crossing from New York City to Liverpool also decreased, from 2 and 3/8 pence to 1 and 15/16 pence, but this reflected a continuing trend downward from a high of 3 and 1/8 pence in 1891.

== The Morgan-Belmont Syndicate ==
In February 1895, the U.S. Government turned to private financial institutions to underwrite the sale of Treasury bonds, stabilize exchange rates, and return the Treasury to its gold reserve requirement. The result was a contract drawn with what was called "The Morgan-Belmont Syndicate".

The persistent balance of payments deficit in the 1890s, which drained the Treasury gold reserves, caused concern from both domestic and foreign investors that the U.S. would abandon the gold standard. This prompted further gold withdrawals and bond liquidations, which exacerbated the deficit. By February 2, 1895, the Treasury's gold reserves had fallen to approximately $42 million, well below the $100 million level required by the Resumption Act of 1875. After a series of failed attempts to restore reserves by issuing bonds and depreciating specie issued for legal tender, the Treasury negotiated a contract with the Morgan-Belmont Syndicate to restore confidence in the government's ability to maintain the convertibility of legal tender into gold.

The full list of syndicate members was not made public; however, the contract named Drexel, Morgan & Co., A. Belmont & Co., J. S. Morgan & Co., and N. M. Rothschild & Sons. The syndicate achieved its goals through a combination of purchasing gold from smelters, convincing its members to purchase Treasury bonds with gold, inspiring confidence in bond and railroad securities investors, and unofficial capital controls by convincing members and gold-exporting houses to "ship no gold" overseas.

== See also ==
- Denver Depression of 1893
- The Driver, a 1922 novel set during the panic
- Second-term curse
