= Maude Robinson =

American Quaker writer

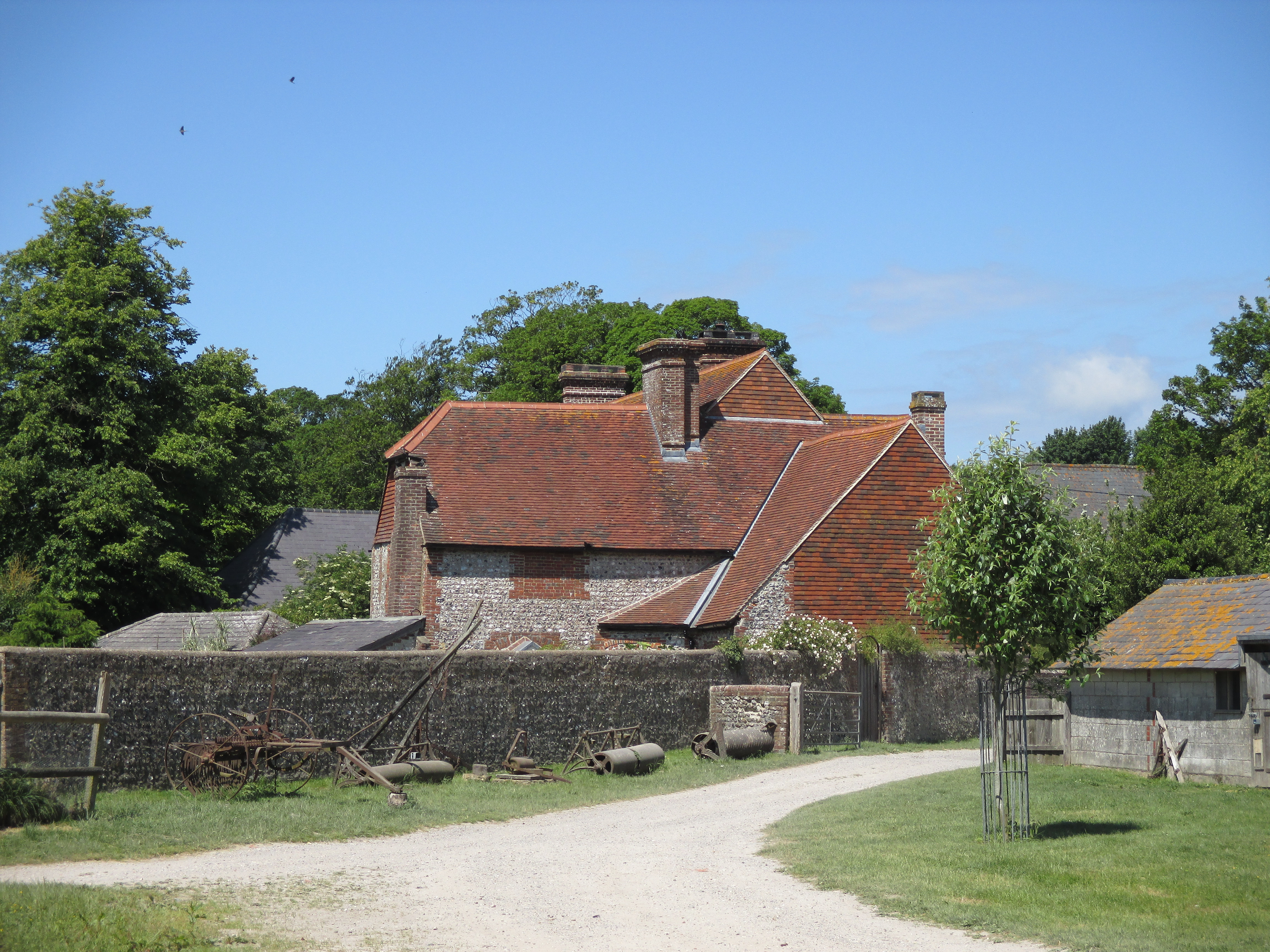
Saddlescombe Farm, where Maude Robinson grew up

Maude Robinson (1859–1950) was a Quaker writer of short stories and a memoir about growing up on a South Downs farm at Saddlescombe in the 1860s. She was the younger sister of the paediatrician Louis Robinson.

== Life and works ==
Maude Robinson described her stories as "simple narratives founded on fact... sketches from real life of men and women who lived and laboured for the spreading of the Truth as it had been revealed to them, and for the help and healing of their fellowmen."

The Time of Her Life is a collection of 12 such stories woven together from letters of Quakers in England from 1682 to 1875. In Wedded in Prison she draws on first-hand written accounts of Quaker experiences, records and traditions of her own ancestors, and oral history. She writes of Quaker courage in the face of religious persecution and the efforts of Quakers to alleviate human suffering in the Irish Famine and the Franco-Prussian War. Contemporary reviewers commented on the wholesomeness, homely fragrance and charm of her stories.

== Bibliography ==
- The Time of Her Life, and Other Stories. London: Swarthmore Press. 1919.
- Nicholas the Weaver and Other Quaker Stories. London: Swarthmore Press. 1922.
- Wedded in Prison, and Other Quaker Stories. London: Swarthmore Press. 1925.
- Love Your Enemies: Two Stories. London: Friends' Book Centre. 1928.
- "Lest We Forget": A Memory of the Society of Friends in the War Years, 1914-1918. London: Peace Committee of the Society of Friends. 1932.
- A King's Reward and Other Quaker Stories. London: Allenson. 1938.
- A South Down Farm in the Sixties. London: J. M. Dent. 1938.

- reprinted as The Quiet Valley: Memories of a South Down Farm in the 1860s (London: Turnastone, 1994, ISBN 0-9523638-0-1)
