= Edward Dewing =

English cricketer

Personal information
- Full name: Edward May Dewing
- Born: 25 April 1823; Carbrooke, Norfolk, England
- Died: 29 October 1899 (aged 76); Nowton, Suffolk, England
- Relatives: Robert Dewing (son)

Domestic team information
- Years: Team
- 1842–1845: Cambridge University
- 1843–1848: Marylebone Cricket Club

Career statistics
Competition	First-class
Matches	38
Runs scored	467
Batting average	7.41
100s/50s	0/0
Top score	36
Balls bowled	44
Wickets	1
Bowling average	?
5 wickets in innings	0
10 wickets in match	0
Best bowling	1/?
Catches/stumpings	6/–
- Source: Cricinfo, 22 August 2019

Edward May Dewing JP (25 April 1823 – 29 October 1899) was an English cricketer and antiquarian.

The son of the Reverend Edward Dewing, he was born in April 1823 at Carbrooke, Norfolk. He was educated at Harrow School, before going up to Trinity College, Cambridge. While studying at Cambridge, he made his debut in first-class cricket for Cambridge University against Cambridge Town Club at Parker's Piece. He played first-class cricket for Cambridge University until 1845, making eleven appearances. He first played for the Marylebone Cricket Club (MCC) in first-class matches in 1843, maintaining an association with the club until 1848. He made nineteen appearances for the MCC, scoring 223 runs at an average of 6.96 and a high score of 36. In addition to playing for Cambridge University and the MCC, Dewing also made first-class appearances for Gentlemen of England on five occasions, as well as appearing once each for the Gentlemen in the Gentlemen v Players fixture of 1845, for England and for a Single XI in the Married v Single match of 1844. He was a founding member of I Zingari in 1845, alongside John Loraine Baldwin, the Hon. Frederick Ponsonby (later 6th Earl of Bessborough), the Hon. Spencer Ponsonby (later Sir Spencer Ponsonby-Fane) and Richard Penruddocke Long, who were dining at the Blenheim Hotel in London's Bond Street after a match against Harrow School.

After graduating from Cambridge, he was admitted to the Inner Temple in 1847, but was never called to the bar. He served in the Suffolk Rifle Volunteers as a lieutenant from 1863–66. He later served as a justice of the peace for Suffolk and was considered to by an authority on East Anglian antiquities. He published three articles in the Proceedings of the Suffolk Institute for Archaeology and Natural History.

Dewing died in October 1899 at Nowton, Suffolk. His son, Robert, also played first-class cricket.

== Works ==
Dewing, Edward (1886). "Notes on Lavenham Church and parish" (PDF). Proceedings of the Suffolk Institute of Archaeology and History. 6: 105–130. ISSN 0262-6004. Wikidata Q102403322.

— (1888). "Roman-British remains found at Hawkedon" (PDF). Proceedings of the Suffolk Institute of Archaeology and History. 6: 9. ISSN 0262-6004. Wikidata Q102403226.

— (1889). "Pedigree of Wingfield" (PDF). Proceedings of the Suffolk Institute of Archaeology and History. 7: 57–68. ISSN 0262-6004. Wikidata Q102403410.
