= Henry Oakes =

English cricketer

Personal information
- Full name: Henry James Oakes
- Born: 23 June 1796; Bury St Edmunds, Suffolk
- Died: 9 September 1875 (aged 79); Nowton Park, Suffolk

Domestic team information
- Years: Team
- 1819: Cambridge University
- Source: CricketArchive, 31 March 2013

Henry James Oakes (23 June 1796 – 9 September 1875) was an English cricketer who played for Cambridge University in one match in 1819, totalling 6 runs with a highest score of 5 not out.

Oakes' family lived at Nowton Court, Nowton, Suffolk, near Bury St Edmunds. He was educated at Reading School, Bury St Edmunds Grammar School and Emmanuel College, Cambridge. He inherited Nowton Court in 1837 and became lord of the manor of Nowton. He was head of his family's bank, Oakes, Bevan & Co. (later Oakes, Bevan, Tollemache & Co., taken over in 1900 by Capital and Counties Bank, which was acquired by Lloyds Bank in 1918). He was mayor of Bury St Edmunds in 1844 and High Sheriff of Suffolk in 1847.

== Bibliography ==
- Haygarth, Arthur (1862). Scores & Biographies, Volume 1 (1744–1826). Lillywhite.
