= Sue Pembrey =

British nurse

Sue Pembrey OBE FRCN
- Born: 1942
- Died: 2013
- Occupation: nurse leader
- Employer: General Nursing Council

Susan Elizabeth Manthorp Pembrey OBE FRCN (1942 – 14 March 2013), known as Sue Pembrey, was a British nurse best known for her contributions to the development of nursing practice and to patient-centred hospital care.

== Early life and education ==
Pembrey was born in Sussex to a medical family. Her mother conducted health visits and provided nursing and midwifery services and her father was a doctor.

From 1961 to 1964, she trained at the Nightingale School of Nursing at St Thomas' Hospital, and followed this with a diploma in social administration from the London School of Economics. Pembrey undertook her PhD at the University of Edinburgh. Later published by the Royal College of Nursing (RCN) as a monograph (The Ward Sister-Key to Nursing: a study of the Organisation of Individualised Nursing (Pembrey, 1980), the study included a comparison of task versus patient allocation and demonstrated the vital role that the ward sister has in ensuring high quality patient care.

== Career ==
Pembrey began her career in the research unit of the General Nursing Council. In the early 1979s, she became a ward sister at St Thomas'. She was a member of the Briggs committee.

In the late 1970s, Pembrey began work on district clinical practice development with the Oxfordshire health authority. In 1989, Pembrey founded the Institute of Nursing in Oxford in collaboration with the RCN, based at the Radcliffe Infirmary.

== Awards and honours ==
Pembrey was made a Fellow of the Royal College of Nursing in 1979. In 1985, she joined the Commission of Nursing Education.

She was awarded the OBE for services to nursing in 1990.

== Legacy ==
The Sue Pembrey Chair at Queen Margaret University Edinburgh was named in her honour and was held by Professor Jan Dewing until her death in 2022.

The Sue Pembrey Award was created to support clinical leaders and person-centred cultures in nursing. It was awarded from 2016.

During the 70th anniversary celebrations of the NHS, Pembrey was noted as one of the 70 nurses who most influenced the NHS from 1948 to 2018.

Pembrey's archive is held by the Royal College of Nursing Archives. They also hold an oral history interview with Pembrey.
