= Nowton =

Village in Suffolk, England

Coordinates: 52.215°N 0.733°E

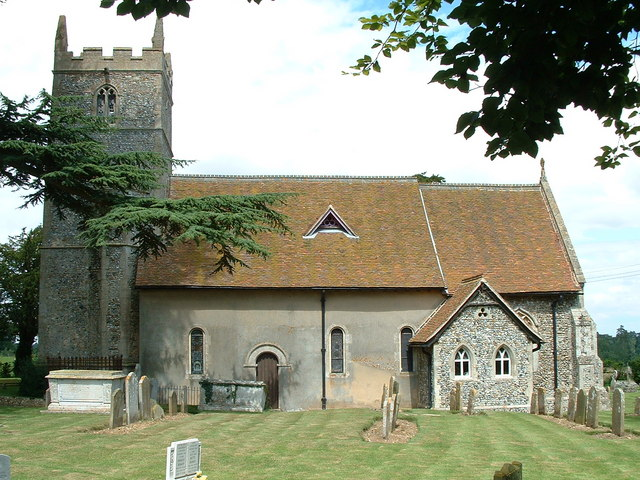
- St Peter's church

- Location within Suffolk
- Area: 4.71 km^{2} (1.82 sq mi)
- Population: 163 (2005); 163 (2011)
  - Density: 35/km^{2} (91/sq mi)
- OS grid reference: TL8660
- District: West Suffolk
- Shire county: Suffolk
- Region: East
- Country: England
- Sovereign state: United Kingdom
- Post town: Bury St Edmunds
- Postcode district: IP29
- Dialling code: 01284
- Police: Suffolk
- Fire: Suffolk
- Ambulance: East of England
- UK Parliament: West Suffolk

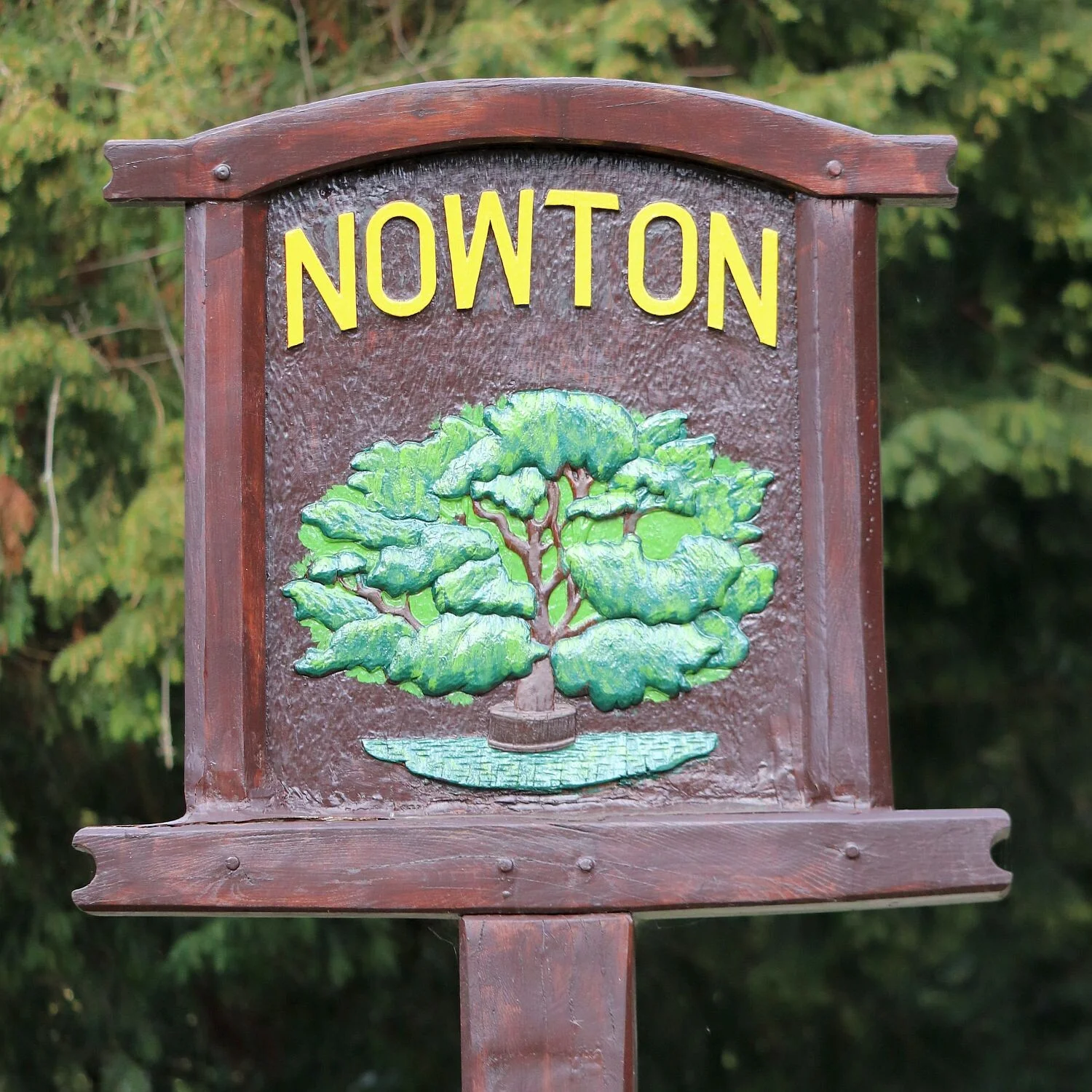
Nowton village sign

Nowton is a small village and civil parish in the West Suffolk district of Suffolk in eastern England. Located on the southern edge of Bury St Edmunds, in 2005 its population was estimated to be 140. At the 2011 census 163 people were recorded as living in the village.

The village is situated to the south of the vast Nowton Park. The park is almost 200 acres in size and is landscaped in typical Victorian style. It is owned by West Suffolk district council and managed for recreation, leisure and nature conservation. It was once part of the Oakes family estate, and contains wild flower meadows, mixed woodland, wildlife ponds and an arboretum featuring trees from around the world. It is renowned for The Lime Avenue with its 100,000 daffodils that emerge in spring.

St Peter's church, is the parish church of the village and dates from the 12th century. It was enlarged and repewed in 1843, at the cost of H.J. Oakes, Esq and J.H Porteus Oakes, Esq and is a Grade II* listed building. The church is a neat building that contains a nave and chancel and a good collection of late medieval Flemish glass windows. The bell tower contains 6 bells.

To the south of the park lies Nowton Court which was built in 1837 and was owned by the Oakes family. For several years it was run as a boarding prep school until it closed and pupils and staff moved to Old Buckenham Hall School in Brettenham. Its most famous alumnus is Nigel Havers. Nowton Court is now a retirement home called 'Nowton Court Village'.

The village is also the location of Grade II listed Nowton Hall. The former farmhouse is dated 1595 on the chimney-stack, with the initials A.P. for Anthony Payne (d.1606). The house stands on the remains of a roughly E-shaped moated site. Prior to the Dissolution, the manor belonged to the Benedictine Abbey of St. Edmundsbury.

== Demography ==
According to the Office for National Statistics, at the time of the United Kingdom Census 2001, Nowton had a population of 131 with 59 households, increasing to a population of 163 in 61 households at the 2011 Census.

=== Population change ===
Population growth in Nowton from 1801 to 1891
Year	1801	1811	1821	1831	1841	1851	1881	1891
Population	170	167	171	137	171	187	180	234
Source: A Vision of Britain Through Time

Population growth in Nowton from 1901 to 2001
Year	1901	1911	1921	1931	1951	1961	2001	2011
Population	201	194	211	185	203	184	131	163
Source: A Vision of Britain Through Time

== Notable residents ==
- Edward Dewing
- Henry Oakes
- Lt.Col. Henry Hopking

== Related pages ==
- Nowton Park
