= Plainsong =

Chants used in the liturgies of the Western Christian Church

Plainsong or plainchant (calque from the French plain-chant; Latin: cantus planus) is a body of chants used in the liturgies of the Western Church. When referring to the term plainsong, it is those sacred pieces that are composed in Latin text. Plainsong was the exclusive form of the Western Christian church music until the ninth century and the introduction of polyphony.

The monophonic chants of plainsong have a non-metric rhythm, which is generally considered freer than the metered rhythms of later Western music. They are also traditionally sung without musical accompaniment, though recent scholarship has unearthed a widespread custom of accompanied chant that transcended religious and geographical borders.

There are three types of chant melodies that plainsongs fall into: syllabic, neumatic, and melismatic. The free flowing melismatic melody form of plainsong is still heard in Middle Eastern music being performed today.

Although the Catholic Church and the Eastern Orthodox churches did not split until long after the origin of plainsong, Byzantine chants are generally not classified as plainsong.

== History ==
A sample of the Kýrie Eléison (Orbis Factor) from the Liber Usualis, in neume notation. Listen to it interpreted.

According to Kenneth Levy, plainsong comes from several traditions: those of "Jewish Synagogue practices", early Christianity and pagans from the ethnic groups of Israel and Palestine. After the Edict of Milan in 313 CE, Christian worship was legalized and the liturgies began to evolve, separating into two families, Eastern and Western, but varying by local tradition. Early chants were simple and likely were syllabic recitations to a single pitch. As time progressed, slight deviations were sung to add punctuations to the text.

The spread of Gregorian chant, the chant repertory of the Carolingian Empire, throughout Europe by the eleventh century meant that more pieces were being written down. As more melodies were recorded, innovations in how music was notated appeared. This would include the first staff notations credited to figures like Guido of Arezzo in the early eleventh century.

The musical notations that were used were called neumes, and they are employed on a four-line staff, unlike the five-line staff we are accustomed to today. The earliest neumes were marks placed above the chant's words to help the performer remember the piece's melody. They showed the general shape of the melody, but did not specify the pitches or intervals that needed to be sung, so the melody had to be learned by ear. It was not until the eleventh century that a notation system was perfected that placed the neumes on a four-line staff. This allowed the music to be written down accurately. In the example from the plainsong mass Orbis Factor, the notes for each syllable of the text are grouped together. Their position on the lines shows their pitch relative to one another, and the dots after some notes indicate a lengthening of the note. The vertical stroke after the word Kyrie indicates where the singer may take a breath.

Most of the early plainsong manuscripts have been destroyed due to war, purposeful destruction and natural causes such as water, fire, and poor environmental conditions. The Toledo Cathedral in Spain has one of the world's largest collections of indigenous plainsong manuscripts devoted to Western Christianity. Their collection consists of 170 volumes of plainsong chants for the procession, Mass, and Office.

There are three methods of singing psalms or other chants, responsorial, antiphonal, and solo. In responsorial singing, the soloist (or choir) sings a series of verses, each one followed by a response from the choir (or congregation). In antiphonal singing, the verses are sung alternately by soloist and choir, or by choir and congregation. It is probable that even in the early period the two methods caused the differentiation in the style of musical composition which is observed throughout the later history of plain chant, the choral compositions being of a simple kind, the solo compositions more elaborate, using a more extended compass of melodies and longer groups of notes on single syllables. The last type of plainsong performance is the solo performed by the choir or the individual performer. A marked feature in plainchant is the use of the same melody for various texts. This is quite typical for the ordinary psalmody in which the same formula, the "psalm tone", is used for all the verses of a psalm, just as in a hymn or a folk song the same melody is used for the various stanzas.

Gregorian chant is a variety of plainsong named after Pope Gregory I (6th century AD), but Gregory did not invent the chant. The tradition linking Gregory I to the development of the chant seems to rest on a possibly mistaken identification of a certain "Gregorius", probably Pope Gregory II, with his more famous predecessor. The term Gregorian Chant is often incorrectly used as a synonym of plainsong.

For several centuries, different plainchant styles existed concurrently. Standardization on Gregorian chant was not completed, even in Italy, until the 12th century. Plainchant represents the first revival of musical notation after knowledge of the ancient Greek system was lost.

In the late 9th century, plainsong began to evolve into organum, which led to the development of polyphony. When polyphony reached its climax in the sixteenth century, the use of plainsong chant was less appealing and almost completely abandoned.

There was a significant plainsong revival in the 19th century, when much work was done to restore the correct notation and performance-style of the old plainsong collections, notably by the monks of Solesmes Abbey, in northern France. After the Second Vatican Council and the introduction of the vernacular Mass, use of plainsong in the Catholic Church declined and was mostly confined to the monastic orders and to ecclesiastical societies celebrating the traditional Latin Mass (also called Tridentine Mass). Since Pope Benedict XVI's motu proprio, Summorum Pontificum, use of the Tridentine rite has increased; this, along with other papal comments on the use of appropriate liturgical music, is promoting a new plainsong revival.

The Plainsong and Medieval Music Society was founded in 1888 to promote the performance and study of liturgical chant and medieval polyphony.

Interest in plainsong picked up in 1950s Britain, particularly in the left-wing religious and musical groups associated with Gustav Holst and the writer George B. Chambers. In the late 1980s, plainchant achieved a certain vogue as music for relaxation, and several recordings of plainchant became "classical-chart hits".

== Chant types and traditions ==
There are different types of plainchant. Syllabic chants are the simplest chants; they one note per syllable for most of the text. Hymns, and some sections of the mass such as the Gloria and Credo are typically set to syllabic chants. Neumatic chants have multiple notes for each syllable. These are often used for short texts such as introits, and the Sanctus and Agnus Dei of the mass. Finally, some chants combine a syllabic setting with occasional use of melismas – a sequence of multiple note on a single syllable. In the example above, there is a nine-note melisma on the first syllable of the word eleison.

Gregorian chant is widely used today, but through much of its history plainchant had distinct local varieties, linked to differences in the form and content of church services. In England, the Sarum rite had its own associated chant, for example. Other chant traditions included the Ambrosian and Visigothic. Some monastic orders had their own chant, such as the Dominicans.

== Composers ==
Plainchant is typically anonymous. Among the few identifiable composers are Adam of Saint Victor (c.1068 – 1146), a prolific composer of Latin hymns, Hildegard of Bingen, a nun who lived in the 12th century, who composed 71 Latin liturgical pieces and Henri Dumont, who published five plainchant mass settings in 1660. Notker Balbulus (Notker the Stammerer) who lived from about 840 to 912, composed hymn chants and sequences, and Hermannus Contractus (Hermann of Reichenau, 1013–1054) is identified as the composer of several well-loved chants including the Salve Regina and the Alma Redemptoris Mater.

== Modes ==
Plainchant employs a distinctive system of modes and this is used to work out the relative pitches of each line on the staff. It is distinct from the modal system used in ancient Greek music.

== Example ==
"O frondens virga"
From the Ordo Virtutum

== See also ==
- Anglican chant
- Gregorian chant
