= Carbrooke Preceptory =

Medieval monastic house in Norfolk, England

Carbrooke Preceptory was a medieval monastic house of Knights Templar and Knights Hospitaller at Carbrooke in the English county of Norfolk.
