= Nowton Park =

Park in Nowton, England

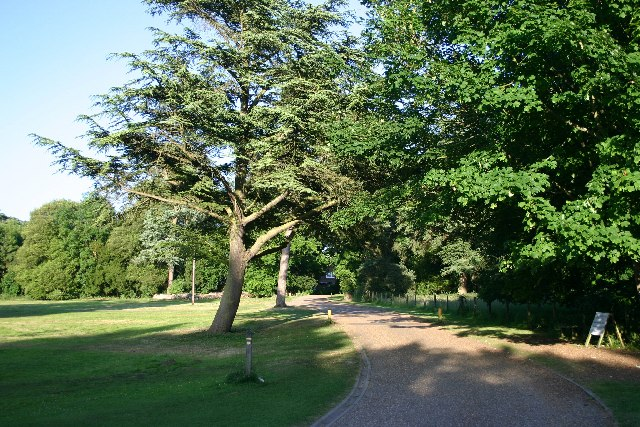
- Interactive map of Nowton Park
- Type: Public park
- Location: Nowton, Suffolk, England
- Coordinates: 52.2226°N 0.7312°E
- Operator: St Edmundsbury Council
- Open: All year
- Website: Official website

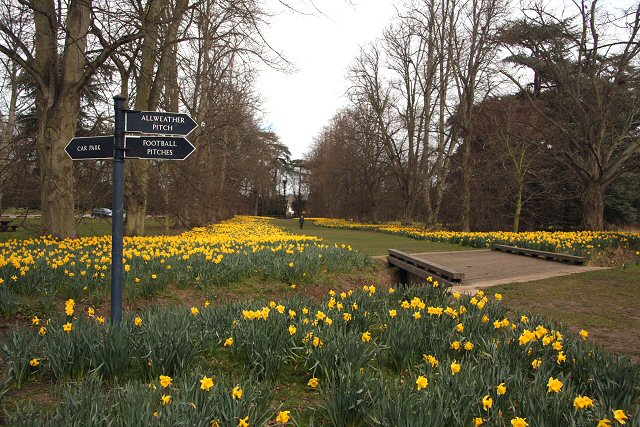
Lime tree avenue with daffodils

Nowton Park is a park in Nowton, Suffolk, England. It is approximately 2 miles south of the centre of Bury St Edmunds.

== History ==
The park and its manor house, Nowton Court, built in 1837, was owned by the Oakes family, headed by Henry Oakes, also lord of the manor of Nowton, from 1837 until his death. Nowton Court is now a nursing home called 'Nowton Court Village'. There is an avenue of lime trees planted around 1880. It offered Nowton Court a view to the northern boundary, in spring over 100,000 daffodils bloom beneath the trees.

== Facilities ==
There is an arboretum which has trees from around the globe, such as eucalyptus from Australia, Kentucky coffee trees from North America and paperbark maple from China. The Nowton Park totem pole stands almost 11m tall near the North American region. It is carved from a western red cedar tree, a species traditionally used by Native Americans. There is a bird feeding station on the edge of the wood. In the winter there is a range of woodland birds such as the blue tit, great tit, nuthatch and the great spotted woodpecker. There is a maze in the shape of a stylised oak tree, it celebrates the Oakes family who formerly owned the estate. Two thousand five hundred hornbeam trees comprise the hedge which is two metres high and over 2 miles in length. At the centre of the maze is a fastigiate oak with upright branches. There are two ponds, a meadow pond which is rich in aquatic life and the school pond which is home to moorhens, mallards and herons. Bury St Edmunds parkrun takes place in the park each Saturday morning starting and finishing at the visitor centre.
