= Carbrooke =

Village in Norfolk, England

Coordinates: 52.583°N 0.876°E

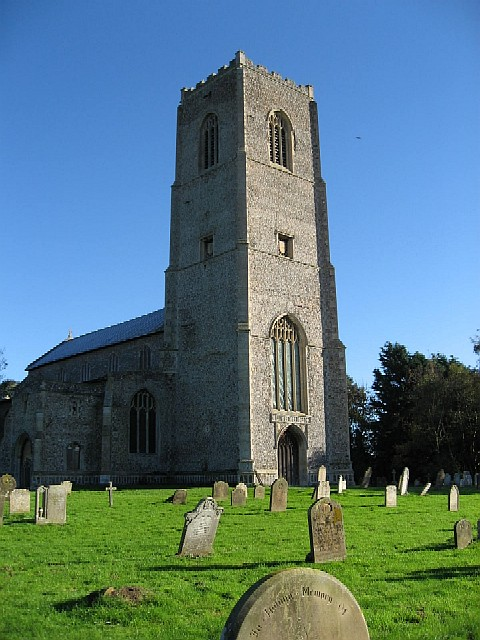
- Church of St. Peter and St. Paul

- Location within Norfolk
- Area: 12.66 km^{2} (4.89 sq mi)
- Population: 2,684 (2021 census)
  - Density: 212/km^{2} (550/sq mi)
- OS grid reference: TF9494002230
- District: Breckland
- Shire county: Norfolk
- Region: East
- Country: England
- Sovereign state: United Kingdom
- Post town: Thetford
- Postcode district: IP25
- Dialling code: 01953
- Police: Norfolk
- Fire: Norfolk
- Ambulance: East of England
- UK Parliament: Mid Norfolk

Carbrooke is a village and civil parish in the English county of Norfolk. It is 2 miles (3.2 km) east of Watton, 13 miles (21 km) north-east of Thetford, and 18 miles (29 km) west of Norwich. At the 2021 census, the parish had a population of 2,684, an increase from 2,073 at the 2011 census.

== History ==
In the Domesday Book, Carbrooke is recorded as a settlement of 62 households in the hundred of Wayland. It was divided between the holdings of Ralph de Tosny and John fitzRichard.

Within the parish there is the site of a former commandery of the Order of St John of Jerusalem which was founded in 1173 and was destroyed during the dissolution of the monasteries. The site, Carbrooke Preceptory, is now ruined and is a scheduled monument.

Part of the former RAF Watton extends into Carbrooke and there remains several bunkers dating from the Second World War which were used for the defence of the airfield.

== Amenities ==
Millenium Green is a playing ground of over 10 acres (4.0 ha) and is run in the interest of the village by a board of Trustees. The annual village fete is held on the green.

Local children attend Carbrooke Academy, a Church of England school.

== Church ==
Carbrooke's parish church is dedicated jointly to Saint Peter and Saint Paul and dates from the 13th century. It is Grade I listed. Throughout the church and churchyard there are many crosses of the Knights Hospitaller, which demonstrate the close links between the church and the nearby commandery. The church includes 20th century glass installed by James Powell and Sons.

Between 1927 and 1955, the Rector of Carbrooke was George B. Chambers, an avowed socialist who installed numerous pieces of artwork designed by his close friends John and Katin Moray-Smith.

== Notable people ==
- Edward Dewing (1823–1899) MCC cricketer and antiquarian, born in Carbrooke.
- George B. Chambers (1881–1969) priest, social activist and author, Vicar of Carbrooke between 1927 and 1955.
