= Louis Robinson =

English physician, paediatrician and author

Louis Robinson, circa 1897.

Louis Robinson (1857–1928) was an English physician, paediatrician and author. An ardent evolutionist, he helped pioneer modern child medicine during the later Victorian era, writing prolifically in journals on the emerging science of paediatrics. Active in scientific debate, Robinson was critiqued in some parts of the press for his outspoken evolutionary views in the wider debate between scientific theories of human origin and the religious view.

== Early life ==
Born 8 August 1857 to a Quaker family in Saddlescombe near Brighton, Sussex, Robinson was educated at Quaker schools in Ackworth and York. His younger sister was the English novelist Maude Robinson. He went on to study medicine in London (at St Bartholomew's Hospital) and Newcastle upon Tyne, before graduating top of his class in 1889. He was married the previous year to Edith Aline Craddock, with whom he went on to have four children.

== Medical career ==
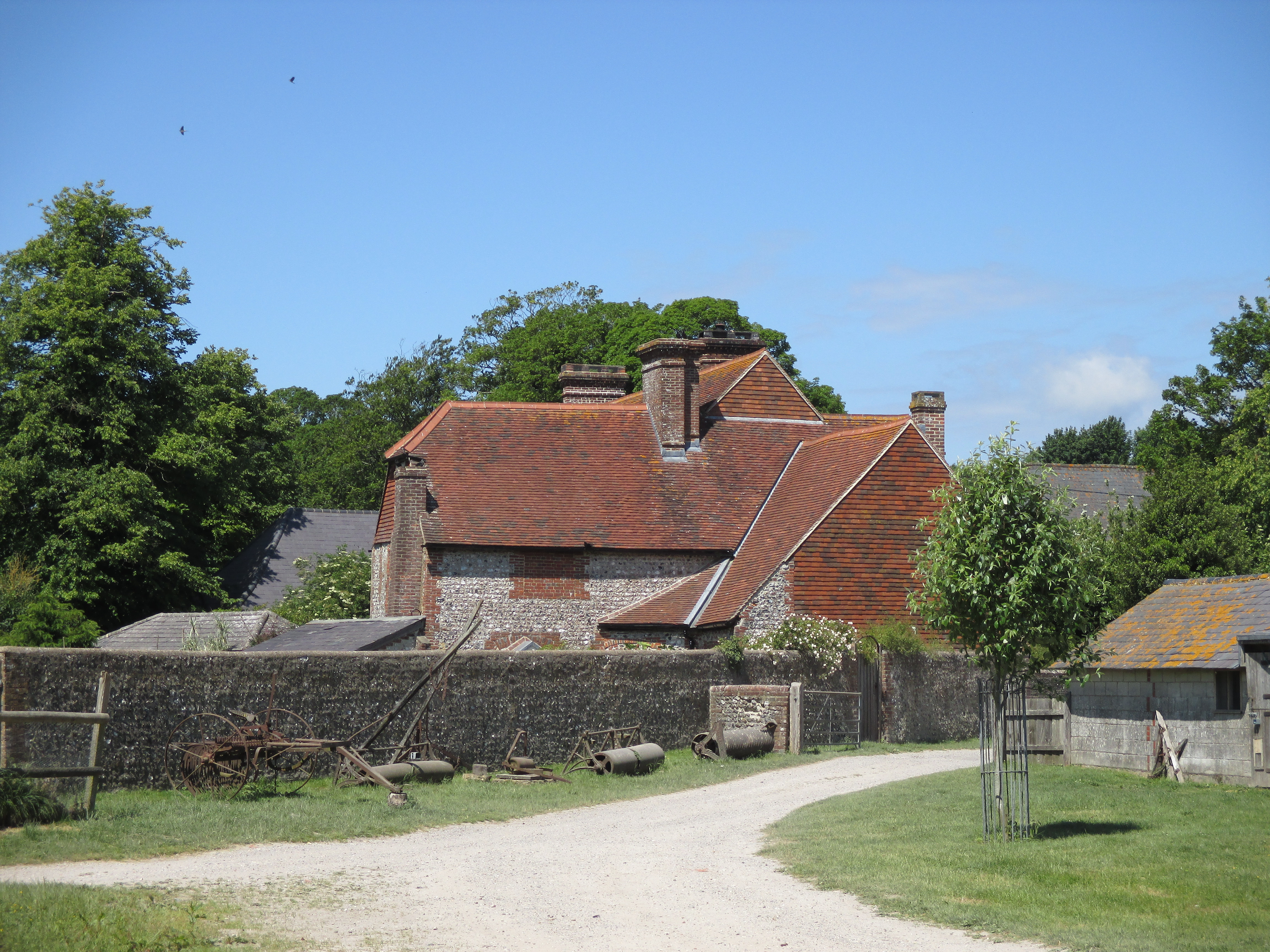
Saddlescombe Farm, where Louis Robinson grew up

Drawing on his extensive research, Robinson's interest in evolution was expressed in a series of articles, which led to an appearance before the British Association at Edinburgh to present his paper "The Prehensile Power of Infants". A keen practitioner as well as theorist, Robinson was one of the first doctors of his era to conduct experiments with young babies, testing over sixty subjects immediately after birth on their power of grip. This echoed the approach of the pioneering German physician Adolph Kussmaul.

== Later years ==
Following a series of lectures at Oxford on vestigial reflexes, he was sought after to teach in both British and American universities, and increasingly noticed by prominent scientists like Huxley, Burdon-Sanderson and Flower. However, Robinson opted to focus on his work as a doctor in Streatham. Nonetheless, he continued his research, employing several assistants, and leading to his publication of a volume on evolution that focused on animal behaviour.

He died as a result of an accidental gunshot wound in Folkestone, Kent on 5 February 1928 aged 70.

== See also ==
- Royal College of Paediatrics and Child Health
- Charles Darwin
- Thomas Henry Huxley
