= Jan Dewing =

British Professor of Nursing

- at TEDx in 2017
- Born: c. 1961; Gateshead
- Died: 2022
- Occupation: Professor
- Partner: Jane

Jan Dewing (born c. 1961 – died 2022) was a British nurse who was the Sue Pembrey Professor of Nursing at Queen Margaret University. She was the first nursing named chair at the university and she led their Person-centred Practice Research and it's graduate research school.

== Life ==
Dewing was born in Gateshead. Her parents were Joan (born Burnside) and John Dewing. Her mother was a tailor and her father was an engineering fitter. She qualified as a nurse locally in 1982 and ten years later she graduated from the Open University. In the following year the University of Wales awarded Dewing her first master's degree in nursing.

She was already a professor at Canterbury Christ Church University when Queen Margaret University appointed her to the named chair as the Sue Pembrey Professor of Nursing in 2015. This was the university's first named chair of nursing.

Dewing and Kate Sanders founded the peer-reviewed academic International Practice Development Journal which she edited from 2011 to 2019. From 2020, she was also the chief editor of the journal Nursing Philosophy which was later edited by Miriam Bender.

Her own research included looking at the challenging problem of gaining consent from people to take part in academic research when they have increasing levels of dementia. She was very interested in Person-centered therapy and she challenged ideas that were being accepted with little underpinning argument. These criticisms included some definitions of Person-Centred therapy and the idea that Karl Rogers had been the first to work in that area.

She led the Person-centred Practice Research Centre and the Graduate School at Queen Margaret University from 2015.

Dewing died from cancer in 2022.

== Publications include ==
- Dewing, Jan (June 2008). "Process Consent and Research with Older Persons Living with Dementia". Research Ethics. 4 (2): 59–64. doi:10.1177/174701610800400205. S2CID 144350357.
- Dewing, Jan; McCormack, Brendan (September 2017). "Editorial: Tell me, how do you define person-centredness?". Journal of Clinical Nursing. 26 (17–18): 2509–2510. doi:10.1111/jocn.13681. hdl:2263/62512. PMID 27960045.
- Dewing, Jan; McCormack, Brendan; Titchen, Angie (2014). Practice Development Workbook for Nursing, Health and Social Care Teams. John Wiley & Sons. ISBN 978-1-118-67670-7.
- Dewing, Jan; McCormack, Brendan; McCance, Tanya (2021). Person-centred Nursing Research: Methodology, Methods and Outcomes. Springer Nature. ISBN 978-3-030-27868-7.
