= National Cordage Company =

American hemp and cordage company, 1887–1893

The National Cordage Company was formed in New Jersey in 1887, for the importation of hemp and the manufacture and sale of cordage. It is noteworthy because of its expansion at the beginning of the 1890s and its initial public offering of $5,000,000 of 8% cumulative preferred stock. The corporation sought to decrease the cost of production and distribution of their products. It issued a prospectus on August 1, 1887 and quickly sought to dominate the market in raw materials.

The sudden insolvency of the business, in 1893, resulted from its inability to acquire enough money to continue.

== Company history ==
In 1891 the firm acquired the Boston Cordage Company by means of preferred stock and time notes. The corporation also acquired the Sewell-Day Cordage Company and the Day Cordage Company in 1891. The latter was a small business located in Cambridge, Massachusetts.

A History of the National Cordage Company by Arthur S. Dewing published in 1913, readable pdf

The immediate cause of the failure of the National Cordage Company was an attempt to acquire a $50,000 loan. G. Weaver Loper and E.F.C. Young, respectively treasurer and president of the First National Bank of New Jersey, were appointed receivers of the National Cordage Company, on the night of May 4, 1893.

The company plays a part in the novel "...And Ladies of the Club", one of whose protagonists runs a rival rope company.
