= John Gellatly =

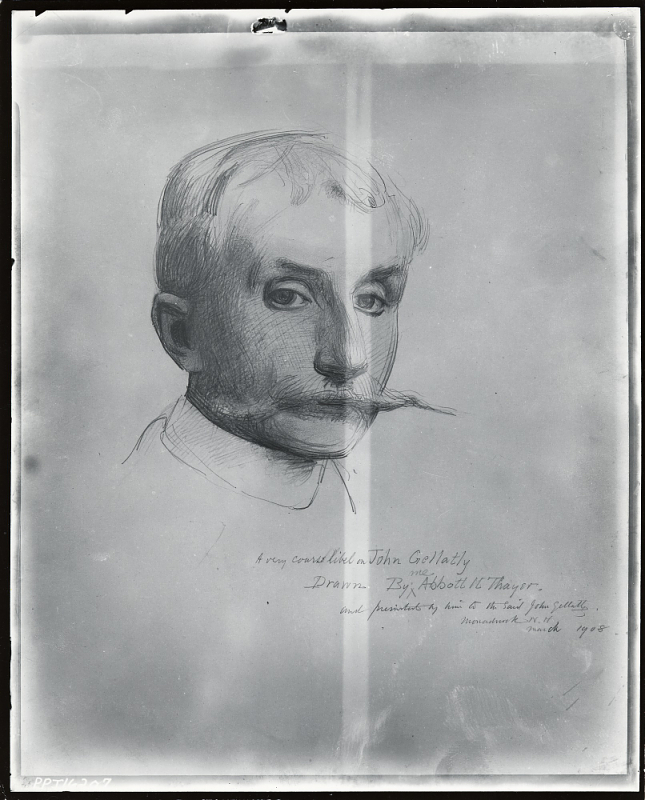
- Born: 1853
- Died: 1931; New York City, U.S.
- Occupation(s): Businessman, art collector and patron
- Spouse: Edith Rogers

John Gellatly (1853–1931) was an American businessman, art collector and patron. He acquired paintings by American artists James Abbott McNeill Whistler, John Singer Sargent, Albert Pinkham Ryder, Thomas Wilmer Dewing, Abbott Handerson Thayer, Childe Hassam, and John Henry Twachtman, as well as Europeans like Peter Paul Rubens and Pierre Puvis de Chavannes. He donated his art collection to the Smithsonian American Art Museum in 1929, for an estimated $5,000,000. He died in poverty.

== See also ==
- Provenance
