= Married v Single (cricket) =

Cricket fixture (1829–1892)

Married v Single was a cricket fixture played sporadically between 1829 and 1892. The teams were, as the name of the fixture suggests, made up of players who were married and those who were single.

The first match was held in June 1829 at Lord's with the Married winning by 27 runs. There were seven occurrences of the fixture until the last in May 1892.

== Bibliography ==
- ACS (1982). A Guide to FC Cricket Matches Played in the British Isles. Nottingham: ACS.
