= Robert Dewing =

English cricketer and British Army officer (1863–1934)

Personal information
- Full name: Robert Henry Dewing
- Born: 6 August 1863; Beyton, Suffolk, England
- Died: 6 November 1934 (aged 71); Ipswich, Suffolk, England
- Relatives: Edward Dewing (father)

Domestic team information
- Years: Team
- 1905–1912: Suffolk
- 1907/08: Europeans

Career statistics
Competition	First-class
Matches	1
Runs scored	3
Batting average	1.50
100s/50s	0/0
Top score	3
Catches/stumpings	1/–
- Source: Cricinfo, 13 July 2019

Robert Henry Dewing OBE (6 August 1863 – 6 November 1934) was an English cricketer and army officer. Dewing served initially in the Caribbean with the West India Regiment from 1884, before transferring to the British Indian Army around 1895, holding several commands until his retirement in 1912. He came out of retirement to serve in the British Army during the First World War. While in British India, he played first-class cricket for the Europeans cricket team.

== Life and military career ==
Dewing was born in August 1863 at Beyton, Suffolk to the cricketer Edward Dewing. He was educated in Bury St Edmunds at King Edward VI School, before attending Brighton College. From there he attended the Royal Military College, Sandhurst. He graduated from Sandhurst in August 1884, entering as a lieutenant into the West India Regiment. He served with the West India Regiment in Jamaica, Gold Coast, Burma, British India and Singapore. By 1895, he had transferred to the British Indian Army, with promotion to the rank of captain coming in August 1895. He saw action in the Boxer Rebellion, and was promoted to major on 23 August 1902. Dewing was commanding the 76th Punjabis when he was promoted to the rank of lieutenant colonel on 26 October 1908.

On visits to England between 1905 and 1912, Dewing played minor counties cricket for Suffolk, making eight appearances in the Minor Counties Championship. While in British India, he made a single appearance in first-class cricket for the Europeans against the Parsees at Bombay in the 1907–08 Bombay Triangular. Batting twice in the match, he was dismissed in the Europeans first-innings without scoring by Maneksha Bulsara, while in their second-innings he was dismissed by the same bowler for 3 runs. He retired from the British Indian Army in October 1912.

After returning to England, he served in the British Army during the First World War. He served with the East Yorkshire Regiment, before being seconded to command a training reserve battalion in March 1917. He later served with the Bedfordshire Regiment, where he commanded the 51st Graduate Battalion. He relinquished this command in February 1919. He was made an OBE in the 1919 New Year Honours.

Dewing died at Ipswich in November 1934, at the age of 71.
