= Maria Oakey Dewing =

American painter

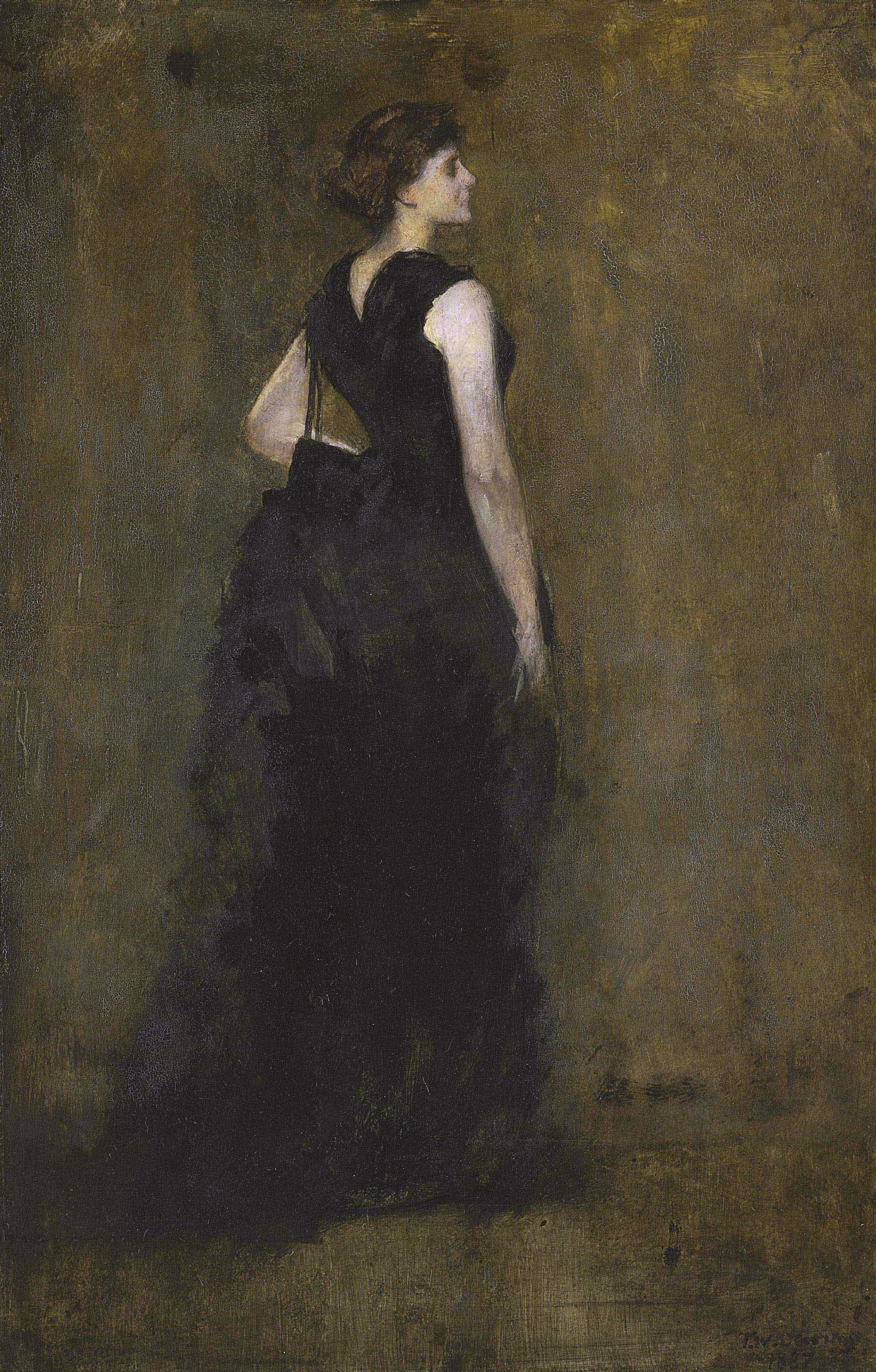
- Thomas Dewing, Woman in Black: Portrait of Maria Oakey Dewing, oil on panel, 1887.
- Born: Maria Oakey; October 27, 1845; New York
- Died: December 13, 1927 (aged 82); New York
- Education: Cooper Union, Antique School of National Academy of Fine Arts, John La Farge
- Spouse: Thomas Dewing
- Patrons: Charles Lang Freer, Whitelaw Reid, John Gellatly

Maria Oakey Dewing (October 27, 1845 – December 13, 1927) was an American painter known for her depiction of flowers. Her work was inspired by John La Farge and her love of gardening. She also made figure drawings and was a founding member of the Art Students League of New York. Dewing won bronze medals for two of her works at world expositions. She was married to the artist Thomas Dewing.

== Personal life ==
Maria Richards Oakey was born in New York City, the fifth child of William Francis Oakey and Sally Sullivan Oakey, who had ten children together. William was an importer, and was also interested in the arts, Sally was a cultured woman and writer who came from a wealthy family from Boston. Her younger brother, Alexander F. Oakey, was an architect with, like his sister, an interest in textiles. He wrote The Art of Life and Life of Art in 1884.

She decided at age seventeen to paint. In 1881 Maria Oakey married Thomas Dewing, whose career was less well established. After that, she was disappointed in her career. As the wife of one of the most prominent figure painters of the day, she felt unable to compete with her husband. At the end of her life, Dewing, expressed doubt in her accomplishments and regret for what she had given up: “I have hardly touched any achievement”. She and her husband had a son who died while an infant, and a daughter, Elizabeth, born in 1885.

== Education ==
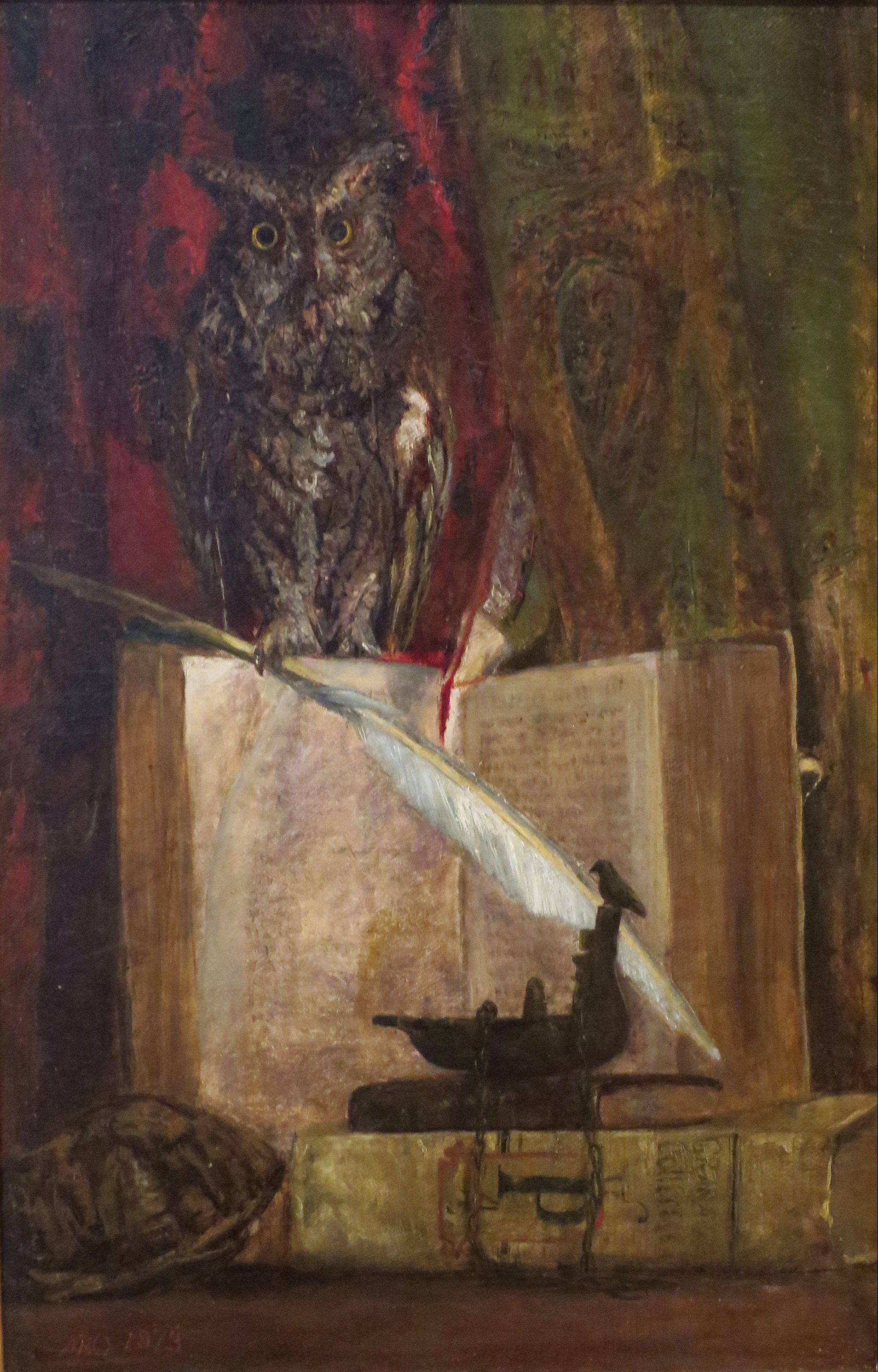
Maria Richards Oakey, The Philosopher's Corner, 1873, High Museum of Art, Atlanta, Georgia

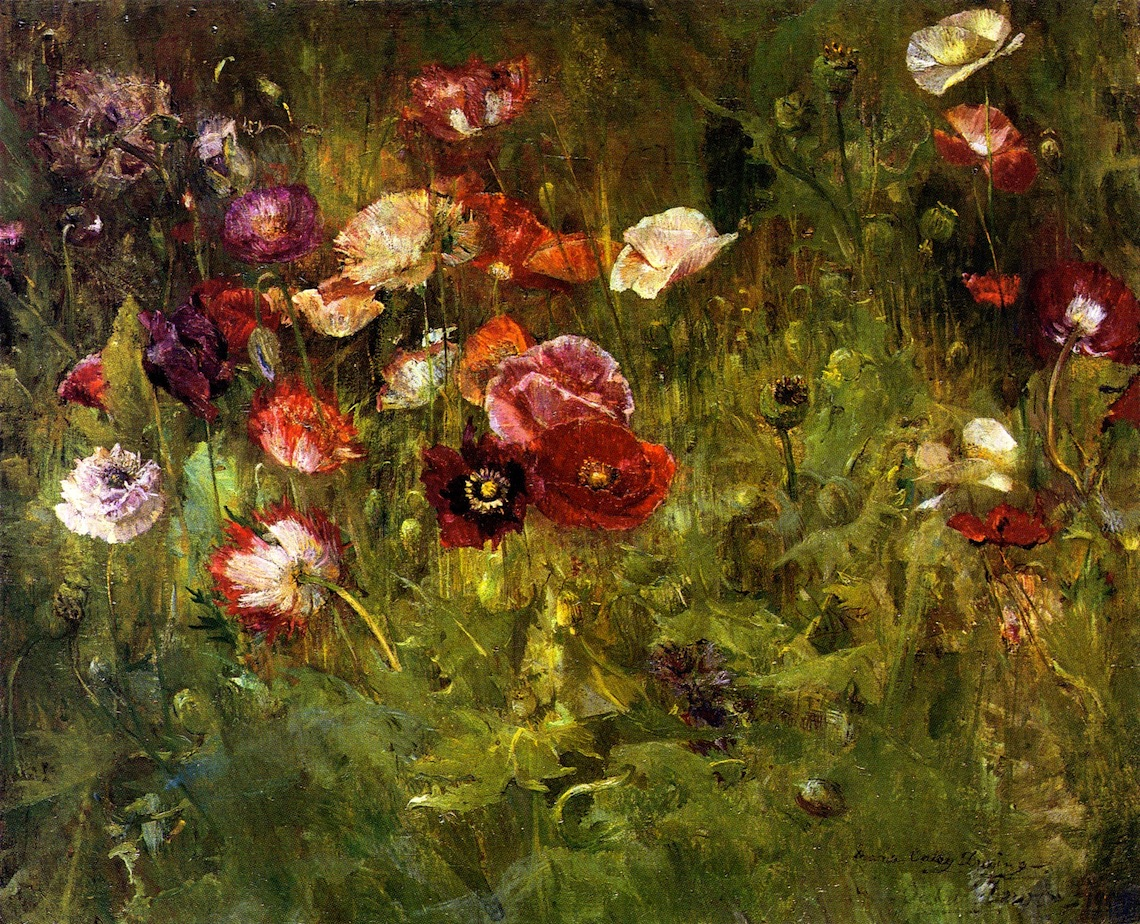
Maria Oakey Dewing, A Bed of Poppies, 1909, Addison Gallery of American Art, Andover, Massachusetts

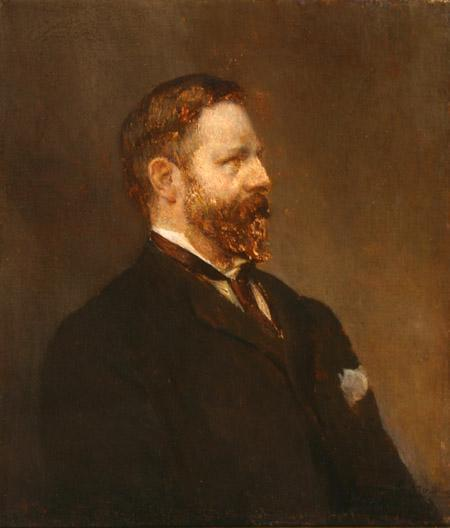
Maria Oakey Dewing, Portrait of Dr. Charles Carroll Lee, 1914

She first attended the Cooper Union School of Design in 1866, studying there until 1870 with William Rimmer, Edwin Forbes, Robert Swain Gifford and George Edmund Butler. There, she took classes with her friend Helena de Kay. From 1871 to 1875 she studied at the Antique School of National Academy of Fine Arts, during which time she shared an apartment with de Kay and took painting lessons from the painter John La Farge. He specialized in Japanese aesthetics and was said by Dewing to have created paintings that were "the most beautiful in all the world" and greatly influenced her own work. As a student she had already begun to gain a reputation as a capable painter, her works attracted "much attention for its broad, vigorous brush work, and rich, glowing color" and were exhibited at the National Academy of Design. She studied with John La Farge, and her work was influenced by La Farge's fascination with Japanese aesthetics. In 1875, Oakey and other students from the academy left to establish the now renowned Art Students League of New York. The same year her works were exhibited at a show organized in New York by La Farge and she studied with landscape artist William Morris Hunt and in 1876 with Thomas Couture.

== Career ==
=== Art ===
Maria and her husband spent the summers from 1885 to 1905 at the Cornish Art Colony in New Hampshire. There both of the Dewings were avid gardeners, an activity that Maria believed was important to paint nature and inspired her floral paintings. She said, "The flower offers a removed beauty that exists only for beauty, more abstract than it can be in a human being, even more exquisite." Garden in May made in 1895, Bed of Poppies made in 1909 and Iris at Dawn are among her most well-known paintings. In 1921 art critic Edwin Bye said her flower paintings were "absolutely unique" and William H. Gerdts said in 1942 that her "flower paintings combine a poetic sensibility derived from her teacher, John La Farge, with a thorough knowledge of botany nourished and enhanced by the cultivation of her own garden." It is also possible that she changed in order to focus her artistic effort in a different direction

Dewing created embroidered applique pieces that were like tapestries in the early 1880s. In 1886 Dewing and her husband worked together on the painting Hymen, which was signed by both of them, and she also painted floral portions of other paintings for him, but without her signature.

Dewing exhibited her work at the 1893 World's Columbian Exposition in Chicago, Illinois and at the 1901 Pan-American Exposition in Buffalo, New York, where she won bronze medals. In 1907 a solo exhibition of 22 of her flower and figure paintings was held at The Pennsylvania Academy of the Fine Arts. She began making figure paintings again later in life.

Her patrons during her career included Charles Lang Freer, Whitelaw Reid and John Gellatly. In her lifetime, her works were compared to French painters Antoine Vollon, Henri Fantin-Latour and John La Farge.

Wistful that as a wife of a successful figure painter she had not realized her full potential, Dewing said in the later years of her career, "I have hardly touched any achievement... I dreamed of groups and figures in big landscapes and I still see them."

Dewing was an early convert to Modernism, and in an article published in Art and Progress in 1915 she wrote: “The flower offers a removed beauty that exists only for beauty, more abstract than it can be in the human being, even more exquisite. One may begin with the human figure at the logical and realistic, but in painting the flower one must even begin at the exquisite and distinguished.”

=== Writer ===
Dewing wrote books and articles about keeping house, etiquette and painting, the articles about art were published in Art and Progress and the American Magazine of Art.

Her works included the following, written from the perspective of an artist:

- Beauty in Dress. New York, Harper & Brothers, 1881. LCCN 10-1025
- Beauty in the Household. New York: Harper & Brothers, 1882. LCCN 12-4027
- From attic to cellar. New York, G. P. Putman's sons, 1879. LCCN 07-26540

== Death ==
Maria Oakey Dewing died on December 13, 1927, in the same city where her life began. She died at her home on 12 West 8th Street (near Washington Square Park) in New York City. She was interred at Mount Auburn Cemetery in Cambridge, Massachusetts. At that time her daughter was Elizabeth Dewing Bender. Her husband, Thomas, died in 1938.

== Collections ==
Her work is included in the collections of the Smithsonian American Art Museum, National Gallery of Art, Detroit Institute of Arts, The Hood Museum of Art, and the Addison Gallery of American Art.
