= Arthur S. Dewing =

American professor, businessman, and author (1880–1971)

Arthur Stone Dewing (1880–1971) was an American professor, businessman, and author. He wrote A History of the National Cordage Company published in 1913.

== Biography ==
Dewing was born in Boston in 1880. He received A.B., A.M., and P.Hd. degrees from Harvard. He also studied at the Ludwig-Maximilians-Universität München before returning to Harvard, where he taught economics with Redverd Opie. He served as president of the Society for the Preservation of New England Antiquities and was a resident member of the Massachusetts Historical Society.

His book on the financial policy of corporations was sectioned and covered subjects including Corporate Securities, Valuation and Promotion, Administration of Income, Expansion, and Failure and Reorganization.

Dewing was a collector of Greek coins. He died in Boston.

== Writings ==
- A Study of Corporation Securities (1904)
- Corporate promotions and reorganizations Harvard University Press (1914)
- Corporation finance; a textbook for colleges and schools of business administration The Ronald Press Company (1922), also by Frances Dewing
- The financial policy of corporations Ronald Press (1921)
- A history of the National Cordage Company, with a supplement containing copies of important documents Harvard University Press (1913)
- Introduction to the history of modern philosophy J. B. Lippincott (1903)
- Life as reality; a philosophical essay Longmans, Green, and Co. (1910)
- National note-book sheets for laboratory work in chemistry (L.E. Knott Apparatus Company (1909
- Public service corporation securities : a lecture Marshall (1915)
