= Thomas Dewing =

19th/20th-century American painter

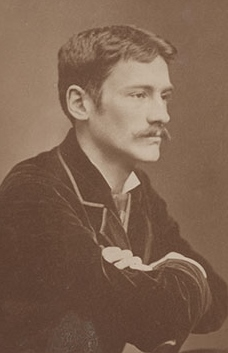
- Born: Thomas Wilmer Dewing; May 4, 1851; Boston, Massachusetts
- Died: November 5, 1938 (aged 87); New York City
- Education: Académie Julian, Paris
- Known for: Painting
- Movement: Tonalism
- Spouse: Maria Oakey Dewing
- Patrons: John Gellatly, Charles Lang Freer

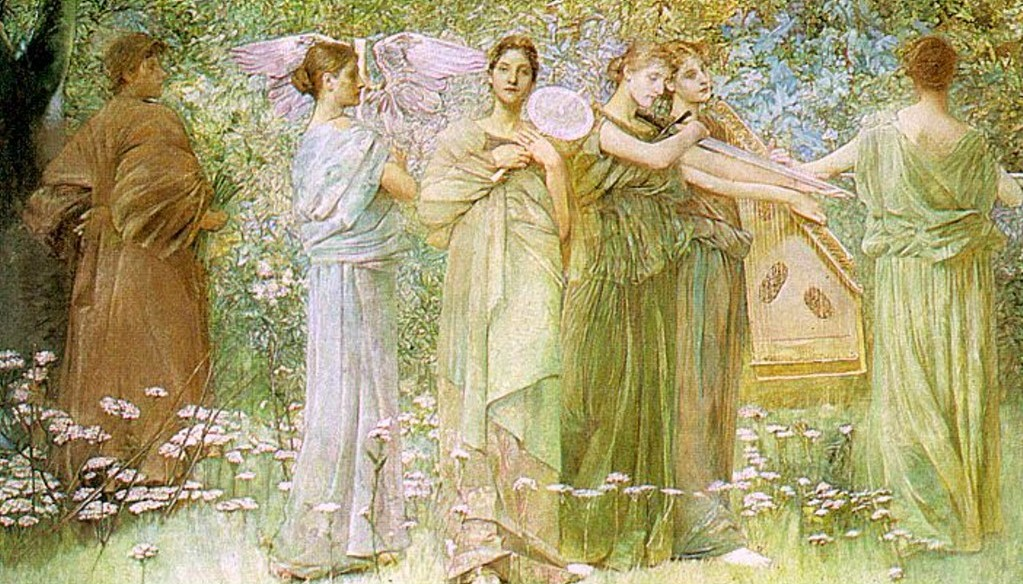
Thomas Wilmer Dewing, The Days, 1886/1887

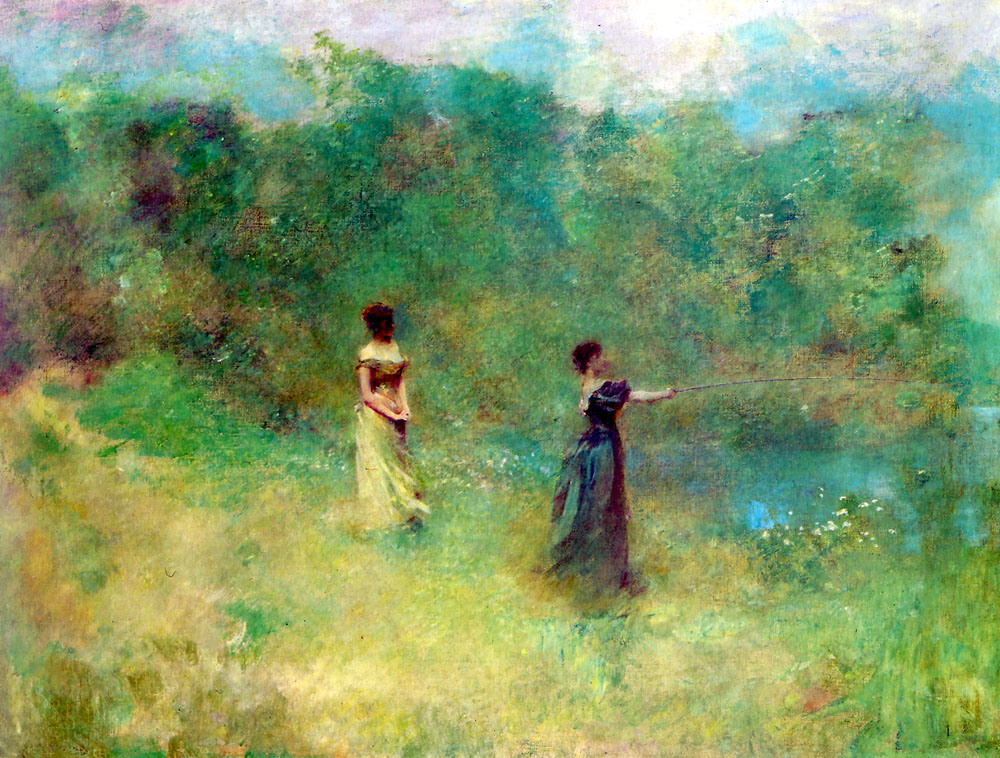
Thomas Wilmer Dewing, Summer, 1890, Smithsonian American Art Museum

Thomas Wilmer Dewing (May 4, 1851 – November 5, 1938) was an American painter working at the turn of the 20th century. Schooled in Paris, Dewing was noted for his figure paintings of aristocratic women. He was a founding member of the Ten American Painters and taught at the Art Students League of New York. The Freer Gallery of Art at the Smithsonian Institution has a collection of his works. He was the husband of fellow artist Maria Oakey Dewing.

== Personal life and education ==
Thomas was born in Boston, Massachusetts to parents Sophronia Durant and Paul Dewing, and served as a lithographic apprentice until at least 1870 when he was 19 years old. He later studied at the Académie Julian in Paris with Gustave Boulanger and Jules Lefebvre beginning in 1876. "There he learned an academic technique; the careful delineation of volumetric form and meticulous but subtle evocation of texture were to be constant features of his work."

In 1880 he moved to New York where he met and married Maria Oakey Dewing, an accomplished painter with extensive formal art training and familial links with the art world. They had a son who died while an infant. In 1885 their daughter Elizabeth was born. The Dewings spent their summers at the Cornish Art Colony in New Hampshire from 1885 to 1905. These years may not have been as peaceful as they seemed, however. Thomas lost both of his surviving siblings, Paul F. and Louise within a month of each other in 1903.

== Career ==
Upon his return to the United States from France in 1878, Dewing returned to Boston. The following year he painted Morning, a composition of two women dressed in Renaissance gowns, which is said by biographer Ross C. Anderson to have the quality of Pre-Raphaelite paintings and emotion of a James McNeill Whistler work. He began teaching at the Art Students League of New York in 1881, the same year he married Maria Oakey.

He is best known for his tonalist paintings, a genre of American art that was rooted in English Aestheticism. Dewing's preferred vehicle of artistic expression is the refined, aristocratic female figure situated in a moody and dreamlike surrounding. Often seated playing instruments, writing letters, or simply communicating with one another, Dewing's sensitively portrayed figures have a detachment from the viewer that keeps the spectator a remote witness to the scene rather than a participant.

He was elected into the National Academy of Design in 1888. Dewing was a founding member of the Ten American Painters in 1898, a group of artists who seceded from the Society of American Artists in 1897. He joined the Society of Landscape Painters, founded in 1899, where he was more aligned with other Tonalist artists. Among his awards were medals at the Paris Exhibition (1889), at Chicago (1893), at Buffalo (1901) and at St Louis (1904).

Key collectors of his works were John Gellatly and Charles Lang Freer.

== Later years ==
He did not paint much after 1920 and lived out his later years in his Cornish, New Hampshire, home. His wife died in 1927 in New York City and Dewing died in New York in 1938.

== Legacy ==
A noted Dewing scholar and curator is Susan A. Hobbs, who co-authored The Art of Thomas Wilmer Dewing: Beauty Reconfigured and co-curated a 1996 exhibition of his works of the same name with Dr. Barbara Dayer Gallati. Until that time it was the largest retrospective of his works; 70 paintings—oils, watercolors, silverpoints and pastels—were shown at the Brooklyn Museum of Art, National Museum of American Art in Washington, D.C., and the Detroit Institute of Arts. The shows ran from March 1996 through January 1997. The exhibition was made possible from funding from The Overbrook Foundation, the David Schwartz Foundation, and the National Endowment for the Arts.

Selected artwork

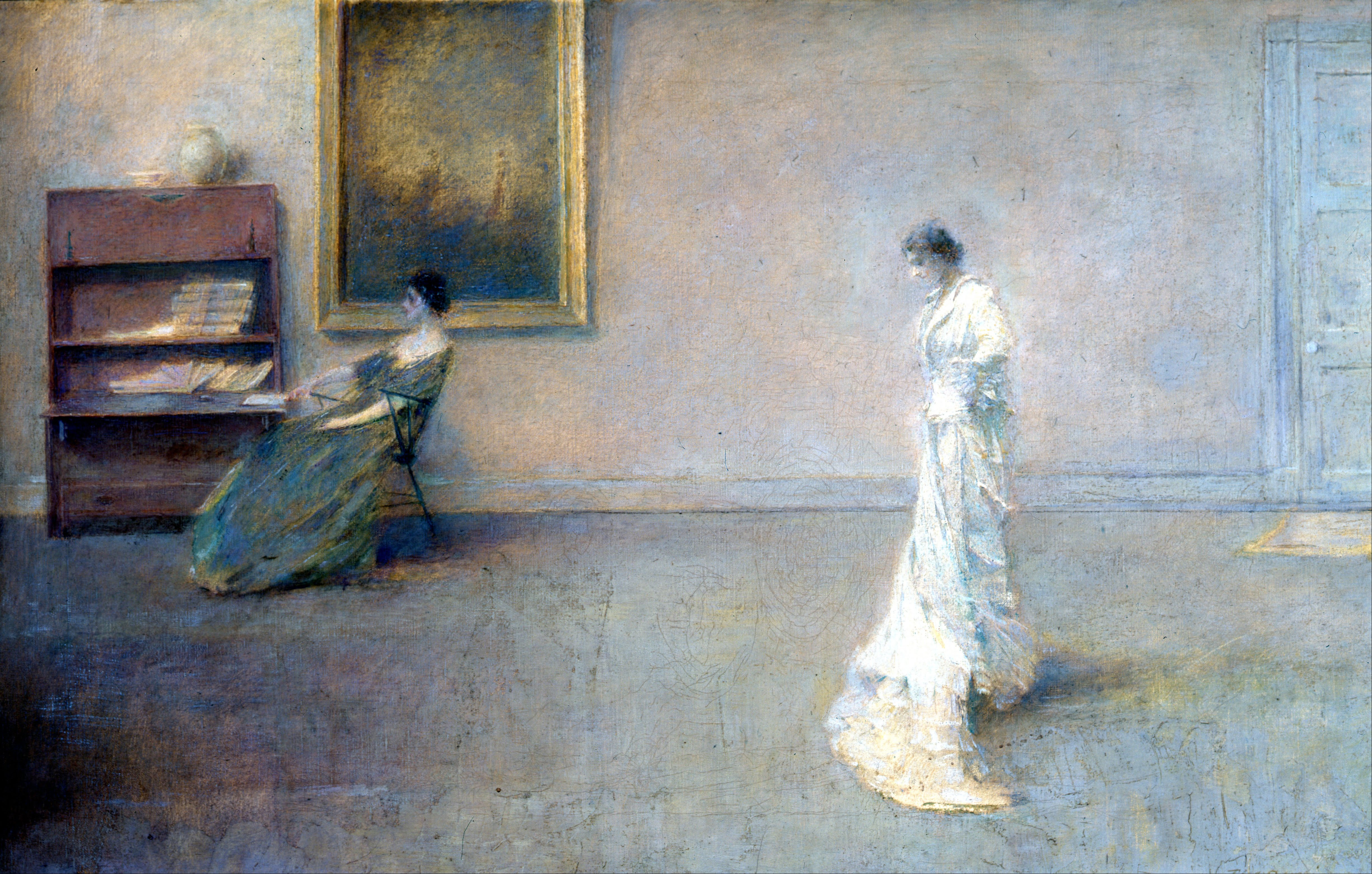
The White Dress

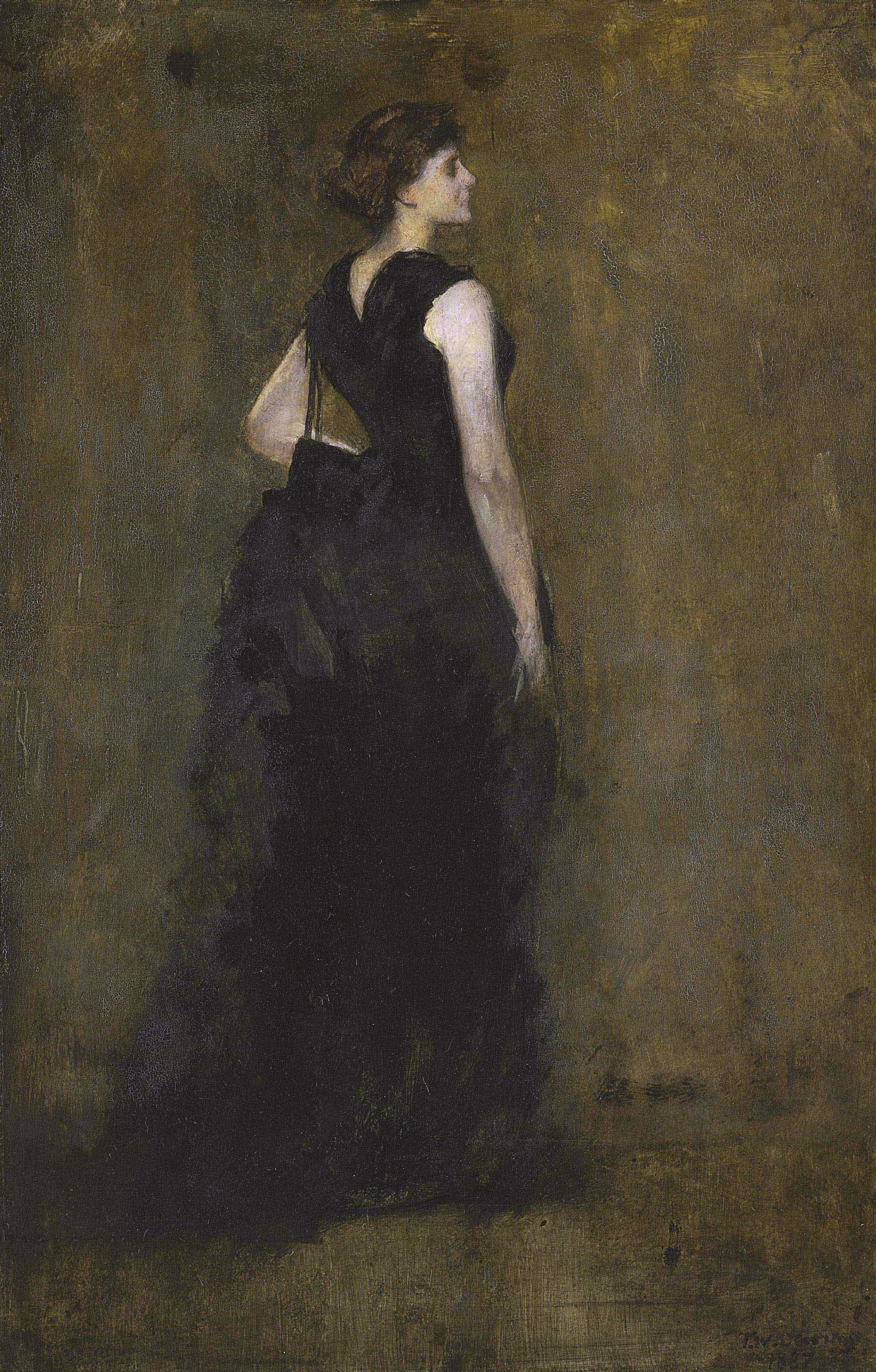
Woman in Black: Portrait of Maria Oakey Dewing, oil on panel, 1887

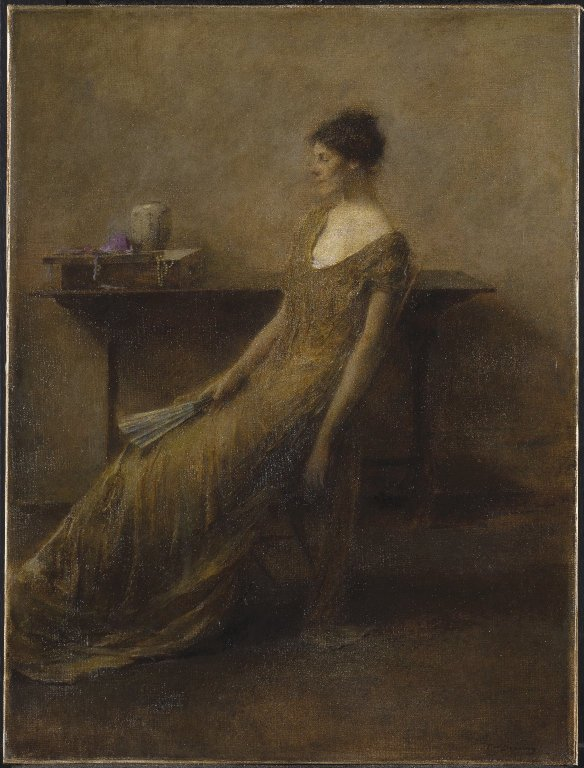
Lady in Gold, 1912, Brooklyn Museum

== Collections ==
His works are in private collections and museums in the United States. At the Freer Gallery of the Smithsonian Institution, a room is devoted to Dewing's paintings.
