= Spilprisen =

Awards for the Danish video games industry

- Awarded for: Achievements in the video game industry in Denmark
- Sponsored by: Arkaden; BC Hospitality Group
- Country: Denmark
- Presented by: Games Denmark
- First award: 2013
- Website: spilprisen.dk/en/

Spilprisen (English: The Game Awards) is an annual awards ceremony honoring achievements in the video game industry among games developed in Denmark. Established in 2013, Spilprisen seeks to celebrate the best Danish video games and spotlight the Danish game industry. The awards were presented by the Danish Producers Association from Spilprisen's inception through 2024.

For 2025, Spilprisen's administration was shifted to the newly founded industry organization Games Denmark in collaboration with Danish video game news website Arkaden and BC Hospitality Group, which hosted the awards at the Bella Center. Previous ceremonies had been held in Copenhagen at AFUK, the Kayak Bar, Pumpehuset, the Nørrebros Theater, the Queen's Hall, and the Bremen Theater. Two ceremonies were held virtually due to the COVID-19 pandemic in 2020 and 2021.

== Format ==
As of 2025, Spilprisen provides awards to video games in 10 different categories. A jury of professionals from the Danish gaming industry create the shortlist of nominees and then determine the winners. The Releases jury evaluates most of the awards, while a separate Live Game jury evaluates the award for Best Live Game. Some years involved a Technical jury for the evaluation of games' technical achievements. Starting in 2025, an audience award called Denmark's Favorite Game is also awarded. The award for Best Leap of Faith (formerly Best Emergent Experience) is given for innovation in video game design.

In addition to the game awards, starting in 2019, Spilprisen began providing awards to outstanding new individuals in the Danish video gaming industry in the Talents of the Year category. Individuals are not nominated for any specific area (like "designer" or "programmer") and can come from any facet of the video gaming industry, including development, production, and execution. Nominees for Talents of the Year must have been employed in the industry for no more than 2 years.

From 2013 to 2017, Spilprisen presented an award for the top student showcase of the year, highlighting students' graduation projects from Danish game development programs such as DADIU and the National Film School of Denmark. Starting in 2018, the student showcase award was discontinued in favor of a "Best Debut", which was awarded to the year's most outstanding game from a new game studio.

== Awards ==
=== 2013 ===
The 2013 awards celebrated games released in 2012. The awards ceremony was hosted during SpilBar 14 at AFUK in Copenhagen on April 18, 2013.

For the first year's awards, all of the games produced by DADIU were nominated for the Student Showcase of the Year award.

Game of the Year: Hitman: Absolution – IO Interactive; Chasing Yello – Tactile Entertainment; Frontline Tactics – Full Control; Subway Surfers – Kiloo / SYBO; Voodoo Friends – Cego	Creator of the Year: BetaDwarf for Forced; IO Interactive for Hitman: Absolution; Kiloo / SYBO for Subway Surfers; Logic Artists – Expeditions: Conquistador; Reto-Moto – Heroes & Generals
Artistic Achievement of the Year: Hitman: Absolution – IO Interactive; Laza Knitez! – Glitchnap; Press and Move – Kayak Club; Top Secret – Trine Laier	Student Showcase of the Year

=== 2014 ===
The 2014 awards celebrated games released in 2013. The awards ceremony was hosted at the Kayak Bar in Copenhagen on April 10, 2014, and it was hosted by Kristian Leth.

The 2014 awards were unique in that after the jury selected the nominees, voting for the winner was opened to anyone in the Danish game industry. A total of 375 votes were collected through April 8, 2014.

Game of the Year: Forced – BetaDwarf; 140 – Carlsen Games; Cloud Chamber – Investigate North; Expeditions: Conquistador – Logic Artists; Spin the Bottle: Bumpie's Party – NapNok Games	Best Innovation: Cloud Chamber – Investigate North; KoGaMa – Multiverse; Spin the Bottle: Bumpie's Party – NapNok Games
Best Game Design: Forced – BetaDwarf; 140 – Carlsen Games; Expeditions: Conquistador – Logic Artists	Best Artistic Achievement: The Silent Age – House on Fire; 140 – Carlsen Games; Mimics – Thomas Ryder
Best Visuals: Forced – BetaDwarf; Mimics – Thomas Ryder; Pack a Puzzle – Set Snail	Best Audio: 140 – Carlsen Games; Cloud Chamber – Investigate North; The Silent Age – House on Fire
Best Showcase: See You on the Other Side – Tunnel Vision Games; Shadow of Kharon – National Film School of Denmark; Stalagflight – Jacob Korsgaard / Emil Kjær; Stickball – Reign Bros.	Jury Special Prize: The Game Museum in Ikast, Denmark

=== 2015 ===
The 2015 awards celebrated games released in 2014. The awards ceremony was hosted at the Pumpehuset in Copenhagen on June 11, 2015.

Game of the Year: Kalimba – Press Play; Chronology – Bedtime Digital Games; Max: The Curse of Brotherhood – Press Play; The Silent Age: Episode 2 – House on Fire	Best Danish-Language Game: Wuwu & Co. – Step In Books; Kingdom of the Feather King – Copenhagen Bombay
Best Technical Achievement: Heroes & Generals – Reto-Moto; Jagged Alliance: Flashback – Full Control; Kalimba – Press Play; Max: The Curse of Brotherhood – Press Play	Best Game Design: Kalimba – Press Play; Chronology – Bedtime Digital Games; Kalimba – Press Play; Space Hulk: Ascension – Full Control; Spoiler Alert – MegaFuzz
Best Educational Game: Machineers – Lohika Games; Lego Duplo Food – Cape Copenhagen	Best Artistic Achievement: Chronology – Bedtime Digital Games; Heartbeats – Kong Orange; Kalimba – Press Play
Best Visuals: Max: The Curse of Brotherhood – Press Play; Chronology – Bedtime Digital Games; Kalimba – Press Play; The Silent Age: Episode 2 – House on Fire; Tentacles: Enter the Mind – Press Play	Best Audio: The Silent Age: Episode 2 – House on Fire; Bee Brilliant – Tactile Games; Kalimba – Press Play; Kingdom of the Feather King – Copenhagen Bombay; Tentacles: Enter the Mind – Press Play
Best Showcase: Plantman – Dennis Nielsen / National Film School of Denmark; Sky Agent – Muton Softworks	Jury Special Mention (Note: Recognizing a 2011 game, before Spilprisen existed, which received significant upgrades and critical acclaim by Spilprisen 2014.): Back to Bed – Bedtime Digital Games
Best Showcase: Plantman – Dennis Nielsen / National Film School of Denmark; Sky Agent – Muton Softworks	Technical Jury Special Mention (Note: Recognizing the game engine that developers use throughout the world to develop their games.): Unity – Unity Technologies

=== 2016 ===
The 2016 awards celebrated games released in 2015. The awards ceremony was hosted at the Pumpehuset in Copenhagen on April 6, 2016.

Game of the Year: Affordable Space Adventures – NapNok Games / Nifflas; Blades of Brim – SYBO; Clandestine – Logic Artists; Progress to 100 – Tim Garbos; Sofus & the Moon Machine – The Outer Zone	Best Danish-Language Game: Sofus & the Moon Machine – The Outer Zone; Bellini's Cellar – Savannah Entertainment; Hope Heroes – Duck & Cover Games
Best Technical Achievement: Affordable Space Adventures – NapNok Games / Nifflas; Clandestine – Logic Artists; RoboBlastPlanet – MovieStarPlanet; Progress to 100 – Tim Garbos; VR Bike – Lars Bindslev	Best Game Design: Affordable Space Adventures – NapNok Games / Nifflas; Block Amok – All Caps; Clandestine – Logic Artists; Hex Frvr – Chris Benjaminsen; Progress to 100 – Tim Garbos
Best Educational Game: MiniMo Town – MiniMo; Animal Captain – Italic; Hope Heroes – Duck & Cover Games	Best Artistic Achievement: Progress to 100 – Tim Garbos; Affordable Space Adventures – NapNok Games / Nifflas; Clandestine – Logic Artists; Sofus & the Moon Machine – The Outer Zone
Best Visuals: Sofus & the Moon Machine – The Outer Zone; Affordable Space Adventures – NapNok Games / Nifflas; Animal Captain – Italic; Blades of Brim – SYBO; Progress to 100 – Tim Garbos	Best Audio: Sofus & the Moon Machine – The Outer Zone; Affordable Space Adventures – NapNok Games / Nifflas; Blades of Brim – SYBO; Hope Heroes – Duck & Cover Games; Progress to 100 – Tim Garbos
Best Showcase: Shih Ho – Kristian Konstrand; VR Bike – Lars Bindslev

=== 2017 ===
The 2017 awards celebrated games released in 2016. The awards ceremony was hosted at the Nørrebros Theater in Copenhagen on April 19, 2017.

Game of the Year: Inside – Playdead; Hitman – IO Interactive; Stikbold! A Dodgeball Adventure – Game Swing	Best Danish-Language Game: Stikbold! A Dodgeball Adventure – Game Swing; Lego Ninjago: Wu Cru – Cape Copenhagen; Utopia 9: A Volatile Vacation – Whalegun
Best Technical Achievement: Hitman – IO Interactive; Bombshell – Interceptor Entertainment; Forced: Showdown – BetaDwarf; Inside – Playdead; Rad Rodgers – Interceptor Entertainment	Best Game Design: Hitman – IO Interactive; Inside – Playdead; THOTH – Carlsen Games
Best Educational Game: Fuzzy House – Fuzzy House; Apollo Null – Jesper Hyldahl Fogh; Coding Pirates – Coding Pirates	Best Artistic Achievement: Inside – Playdead; La Petite Mort – Loveable Hat Cult; Lost Tracks – The Animation Workshop
Best Visuals: Inside – Playdead; Bombshell – Interceptor Entertainment; Hitman – IO Interactive; Lost Tracks – The Animation Workshop; Stikbold! A Dodgeball Adventure – Game Swing	Best Audio: Inside – Playdead; Hitman – IO Interactive; Lost Tracks – The Animation Workshop; Tales from the Void – PortaPlay; THOTH – Carlsen Games
Best Showcase: Lost Tracks – The Animation Workshop; Colorave – Anne Clausen / Simon Stålhandske; Picoban – Jesper Brun Halfter

=== 2018 ===
The 2018 awards celebrated games released in 2017. The awards ceremony was hosted at the Queen's Hall at the Royal Library in Copenhagen on April 17, 2018, and it was hosted by Sara Frost.

Game of the Year: Echo – Ultra Ultra; Conduct Deluxe! – Northplay; Expeditions: Viking – Logic Artists; Figment – Bedtime Digital Games; A Hat in Time – Gears for Breakfast; Returner 77 – Fantastic, Yes	Best Technical Achievement: Echo – Ultra Ultra; Expeditions: Viking – Logic Artists; A Hat in Time – Gears for Breakfast
Best Game Design: Conduct Deluxe! – Northplay; Echo – Ultra Ultra; Expeditions: Viking – Logic Artists; A Hat in Time – Gears for Breakfast; Invert – Glitchnap; Returner 77 – Fantastic, Yes	Special Mention (Best Narrative): Aporia: Beyond the Valley – Investigate North
Best Visuals: Echo – Ultra Ultra; Aporia: Beyond the Valley – Investigate North; Conduct Deluxe! – Northplay; Figment – Bedtime Digital Games; Invert – Glitchnap; Mur – Step In Books; Returner 77 – Fantastic, Yes	Best Audio: Echo – Ultra Ultra; Aporia: Beyond the Valley – Investigate North; Bee Brilliant Blast – Tactile Games; Figment – Bedtime Digital Games; A Hat in Time – Gears for Breakfast; Returner 77 – Fantastic, Yes
Best Debut: A Hat in Time – Gears for Breakfast; Echo – Ultra Ultra; Guru Gloo: Adventure Climb – Niila Games; Returner 77 – Fantastic, Yes; Zero-G – Trautner Games

=== 2019 ===
The 2019 awards celebrated games released in 2018. The awards ceremony was held at the Bremen Theater in Copenhagen.

Game of the Year: Forgotton Anne – ThroughLine Games; Cosmic Top Secret – Those Eyes; Hitman 2 – IO Interactive; Spitkiss – Triple Topping	Best Live Game: KoGaMa – Multiverse; BlockStarPlanet – MovieStarPlanet; Cookie Cats Blast – Tactile Games; Heroes & Generals – Reto-Moto; Hitman 2 – IO Interactive; MovieStarPlanet – MovieStarPlanet; Subway Surfers – SYBO
Best Technical Achievement: Youropa – Frecle; Forgotton Anne – ThroughLine Games; Frantics – NapNok Games; Hitman 2 – IO Interactive; Planet Alpha – Planet Alpha; Youropa – Frecle	Best Game Design: Hitman 2 – IO Interactive; Forgotton Anne – ThroughLine Games; Spitkiss – Triple Topping; Youropa – Frecle
Best Visuals: Forgotton Anne – ThroughLine Games; Cosmic Top Secret – Those Eyes; Hitman 2 – IO Interactive; Planet Alpha – Planet Alpha; Wartile – Playwood Project	Best Audio: Hitman 2 – IO Interactive; Cosmic Top Secret – Those Eyes; Forgotton Anne – ThroughLine Games; Planet Alpha – Planet Alpha; Shrug Island: The Meeting – Tiny Red Camel; Wartile – Playwood Project; Youropa – Frecle
Best Debut: Forgotton Anne – ThroughLine Games; Planet Alpha – Planet Alpha; Shrug Island: The Meeting – Tiny Red Camel; Spitkiss – Triple Topping; Wartile – Playwood Project; Youropa – Frecle

==== Upcoming Talents of the Year ====
Name	Title	Company
Ida Hartmann	Artist & Game Designer	Niila Games
Elisa Marchesi	Visual Artist	Game Swing
Emil Skriver	Environmental Artist	IO Interactive
Murray Somerville	Art Director	Triple Topping

=== 2020 ===
The 2020 awards celebrated games released in 2019. Due to the ongoing COVID-19 pandemic, the awards ceremony was hosted virtually on April 10, 2014, and it was hosted by Jacob Ege Hinchely and Elias Eliot from the Han Duo podcast.

Game of the Year: What the Golf? – Triband; Lego Builder's Journey – Light Brick Studio / Lego Mobile Games; Mutazione – Die Gute Fabrik; Tick Tock: A Tale for Two – Other Tales Interactive	Best Live Game: Deep Rock Galactic – Ghost Ship Games; Bullet League – Funday Factory; Deep Rock Galactic – Ghost Ship Games; Hitman 2 – IO Interactive; Trailmakers – Flashbulb; War of Rights – Campfire Games
Best Emergent Experience: Tick Tock: A Tale for Two – Other Tales Interactive; Dick Wilde 2 – Bolverk Games; Glyph – Bolverk Games; Truth Hunter – Batavia Media / PortaPlay	Best Game Design: What the Golf? – Triband; Felix the Reaper – Kong Orange; Lego Builder's Journey – Light Brick Studio / Lego Mobile Games; Oddman – Set Snail; Tick Tock: A Tale for Two – Other Tales Interactive; Trailmakers – Flashbulb
Best Narrative: Mutazione – Die Gute Fabrik; Burning Daylight – Burning Daylight Team; Felix the Reaper – Kong Orange; Lego Builder's Journey – Light Brick Studio / Lego Mobile Games; Tick Tock: A Tale for Two – Other Tales Interactive	Best Visuals: Lego Builder's Journey – Light Brick Studio / Lego Mobile Games; Burning Daylight – Burning Daylight Team; Felix the Reaper – Kong Orange; Mutazione – Die Gute Fabrik; What the Golf? – Triband
Best Audio: Lego Builder's Journey – Light Brick Studio / Lego Mobile Games; Burning Daylight – Burning Daylight Team; Felix the Reaper – Kong Orange; Mutazione – Die Gute Fabrik; Trailmakers – Flashbulb; What the Golf? – Triband	Best Debut: Tick Tock: A Tale for Two – Other Tales Interactive; Burning Daylight – Burning Daylight Team; Exactamundo: World Trivia Tour – Tumblecrate; Pandaball – Getagame; Tiny Tomb: Dungeon Explorer – Tiny Corp

==== Talents of the Year ====
Name	Title	Company
Maja From Andersen	Data Analyst	Funday Factory
Andreas Lindgren Bech	Art Director	Invisible Walls
Christoffer Bech	Game Designer	Set Snail
Axel Emanuelsson	Game Programmer	Ghost Ship Games
Frederik Overgaard Jeppesen	3D Artist	Ghost Ship Games
Praveen Namasivayam	Event & Dialogue Writer	PortaPlay
Christian Biskopstø Thomsen	Game Programmer	Funday Factory
Erik Arvid Manne Westermark	Environment Art Intern	IO Interactive

=== 2021 ===
The 2021 awards celebrated games released in 2020. For the second year in a row, due to the ongoing COVID-19 pandemic, the awards ceremony was hosted virtually on April 28, 2014, on Twitch, and it was hosted by Jacob Ege Hinchely and Elias Eliot from the Han Duo podcast.

Game of the Year: Deep Rock Galactic – Ghost Ship Games; Broken Lines – PortaPlay; Lightmatter – Tunnel Vision Games; Stilstand – Niila Games; Welcome to Elk – Triple Topping; Wonder Woollies Play World – Fuzzy House	Best Live Game: BlockStarPlanet – MovieStarPlanet; Deep Rock Galactic – Ghost Ship Games; Lily's Garden – Tactile Games; Minion Masters – BetaDwarf; Subway Surfers – SYBO
Best Emergent Experience: Stilstand – Niila Games; ABC Runner – Umami Games; Fireworks Mania – Laumania; Jabii – Jabii Group	Best Game Design: Deep Rock Galactic – Ghost Ship Games; AkiRobots – FlatPonies; Broken Lines – PortaPlay; Headland – Northplay; Lightmatter – Tunnel Vision Games; Welcome to Elk – Triple Topping
Best Kids Game: Wonder Woollies Play World – Fuzzy House; AkiRobots – FlatPonies; Birdwatcher – Set Snail; The Wild Wonderful Game of Nature – Northplay	Best Narrative: Journey of the Broken Circle – Lovable Hat Cult; Broken Lines – PortaPlay; Lightmatter – Tunnel Vision Games; Stilstand – Niila Games; Welcome to Elk – Triple Topping
Best Visuals: Welcome to Elk – Triple Topping; Broken Lines – PortaPlay; Deep Rock Galactic – Ghost Ship Games; Lightmatter – Tunnel Vision Games; Stilstand – Niila Games; Wonder Woollies Play World – Fuzzy House	Best Audio: Deep Rock Galactic – Ghost Ship Games; Lightmatter – Tunnel Vision Games; Stilstand – Niila Games; Welcome to Elk – Triple Topping
Best Debut: Lightmatter – Tunnel Vision Games; ABC Runner – Umami Games; AkiRobots – FlatPonies; Deep Rock Galactic – Ghost Ship Games; Fireworks Mania – Laumania

==== Talents of the Year ====
Name	Title	Company
Mikkel Anttila	Game & Audio Designer	Triple Topping
Jakob Baldwin	3D Artist	SYBO
Frederik Max Christensen	Sound Designer	Cujo Sound
Marléne Delrive	Junior Gameplay Designer	Triband
Anders Lund Dick	Rigging Artist	Invisible Walls
Kasper Egholm Endahl	Game Developer	ARblox
Camilla Holler	Character Artist	PortaPlay
Simone Jahn	3D Artist	Ghost Ship Games
Kasper Kjæhr	CG Artist	Kong Orange
Karina Korsgaard Jensen	Programmer	Triband
Astrid Knappmann	Gameplay Designer	Triband
Mia Rosendahl Larsen	Junior QA Specialist	IO Interactive
Lisa Maurer	Gameplay Designer	Triband
Erik Høj Petersen	Software Developer	Set Snail
Jonas Hingeben Ruge	Platform Engineer	Ghost Ship Games
Felix Diemar Sherar	Creative Director	FlatPonies

=== 2022 ===
The 2022 awards celebrated games released in 2021. The awards ceremony was hosted at the Bremen Theater in Copenhagen on April 26, 2022, and it was hosted by Marie Høst.

Game of the Year: Hitman 3 – IO Interactive; First Class Trouble – Invisible Walls; Mind Scanners – The Outer Zone; Rubber Bandits – Flashbulb Games; Ynglet – Nifflas / Triple Topping	Best Live Game: Deep Rock Galactic – Ghost Ship Games; King of Retail – Freaking Games; Penny & Flo: Finding Home – Tactile Games; Subway Surfers – SYBO; What the Golf? – Triband
Best Emergent Experience: Spotracers – Level Up Garage; Cosmic Top Secret at Stevnsfort – Those Eyes / Klassefilm / Stevnsfort; Inkslinger – Gateway; Mr. Beard's Letter Hunt – Hello Monday; Shadow – Makropol	Best Game Design: Hitman 3 – IO Interactive; First Class Trouble – Invisible Walls; Mind Scanners – The Outer Zone; Rubber Bandits – Flashbulb Games; Ynglet – Nifflas / Triple Topping
Best Kids Game: Rosa's Neighborhood – Dwarf; Blue Eyes – Savannah Entertainment; Mini Song – Hello Monday; Money City – PortaPlay; Mr. Beard's Letter Hunt – Hello Monday	Best Narrative: Mind Scanners – The Outer Zone; Arcadia Fallen – Galdra Studios; Hitman 3 – IO Interactive; Inkslinger – Gateway; The ER: Patient Typhon – Professional Villains
Best Visuals: Hitman 3 – IO Interactive; First Class Trouble – Invisible Walls; Mind Scanners – The Outer Zone; Rubber Bandits – Flashbulb Games; Ynglet – Nifflas / Triple Topping	Best Audio: Ynglet – Nifflas / Triple Topping; First Class Trouble – Invisible Walls; Hitman 3 – IO Interactive; Inkslinger – Gateway; Mind Scanners – The Outer Zone; Rubber Bandits – Flashbulb Games
Best Debut: First Class Trouble – Invisible Walls; Arcadia Fallen – Galdra Studios; Darkfire Heroes – Rovio Copenhagen; Inkslinger – Gateway; Slay the Dragon! – Slay the Dragon! Team

==== Talents of the Year ====
Name	Title	Company
Jacob Hvid Amstrup	Co-founder	Gateway
Arendse Løvind Andersen	Design Researcher	Triband
Karolina Arancibiova	Junior Unity Developer	MovieStarPlanet
Sebastién Diego Gaye	Art Director & Motion Graphics Designer	Serious Games Interactive
Mathias Stig Jensen	Backend Engineer	Flashbulb Games
Lucas Andreas Vilches Møller	Co-founder and Narrative Designer	Gateway
Michelle Lind Østrup	Full Stack Programmer	Serious Games Interactive
Robert Pettersson	3D Artist	Game Swing
Hong-Hanh Phan	Graphic Artist	MovieStarPlanet
Jakob Andkjær Poulsgærd	Environment Art Intern	IO Interactive
Joe Sierejko	Backend C++ Programmer	Invisible Walls
Kristine S. Wellendorf	Software Tester	MovieStarPlanet

=== 2023 ===
The 2023 awards celebrated games released in 2022. The awards ceremony was hosted on April 25, 2023.

Game of the Year: Expeditions: Rome – Logic Artists; Anglerfish – Professional Villains; The Forest Quartet – Mads & Friends; Gerda: A Flame in Winter – PortaPlay; Time on Frog Island – Half Past Yellow; What the Bat? – Triband	Best Live Game: Hitman 3 – IO Interactive; Deep Rock Galactic – Ghost Ship Games; First Class Trouble – Invisible Walls; Rubber Bandits – Flashbulb Games; Subway Surfers – SYBO; What the Golf? – Triband
Best Emergent Experience: Voice Attorney – Bolverk Games; Bore Dome – Goblin Rage; Drama Studio – Ugly Duckling Games; Ka-ching! – Northplay / Widowgrove; Monster Gartner – Rigshospitalet / Trifork / Serious Games Interactive / Khora / Manyone	Best Game Design: Expeditions: Rome – Logic Artists; Anglerfish – Professional Villains; Gerda: A Flame in Winter – PortaPlay; Power to the People – Rhombico Games; Time on Frog Island – Half Past Yellow; What the Bat? – Triband
Best Kids Game: Time on Frog Island – Half Past Yellow; Bille & Trille: All the Way Out in the Forest – Savannah Entertainment; Monster Gartner – Rigshospitalet / Trifork / Serious Games Interactive / Khora / Manyone; Uncle Reje's Cool Game – Ahoot Media / DR	Best Narrative: Gerda: A Flame in Winter – PortaPlay; Anglerfish – Professional Villains; Expeditions: Rome – Logic Artists; The Forest Quartet – Mads & Friends
Best Visuals: The Forest Quartet – Mads & Friends; Anglerfish – Professional Villains; Gerda: A Flame in Winter – PortaPlay; Subway Surfers Tag – SYBO; Time on Frog Island – Half Past Yellow	Best Audio: The Forest Quartet – Mads & Friends; Expeditions: Rome – Logic Artists; Gerda: A Flame in Winter – PortaPlay; Time on Frog Island – Half Past Yellow
Best Debut: Time on Frog Island – Half Past Yellow; Bore Dome – Goblin Rage; Presenter Slides – Schifter & Brin

==== Talents of the Year ====
Name	Title	Company
Anahid Attaran	Game Designer	PortaPlay
Sebastian Binder	Level Designer	PortaPlay
Thea Bjerregaard	COO & Producer	CinderCat Games
Eva-Celia Del Rey	Graphic Artist	MovieStarPlanet
Nilas Røpke Driessen	2D Artist	Triband
Linnea Ejersbo	Unity Generalist	Triple Topping
Harpa Ellertsdóttir	3D Artist	Ghost Ship Games
Alberto Giudice	Level Designer	Triband
Esben Gravesen	Programmer	Kong Orange
Daniel Hansen	Game Programmer	Funday Games
Jonathan Jørgensen	Porting & Tools Programmer	Triple Topping
Andreas Kidholm	Producer	Flashbulb Games
Jasper Laureijs	Level Designer	PortaPlay
Dennis Löfgren	Programmer	Ghost Ship Games
Mathis Meilby	Game Designer	Kong Orange
Juliane Brostrup Norske	Junior Concept Artist	SYBO
Casper Øbro	Tech Artist	Floppy Club
Alice Persson	Level Designer	FlatPonies
Louise Pri	Associate Producer	IO Interactive
Amalie Pil Tarding	Programmer	Those Eyes
Søren Tang	2D Artist & Animation	Triple Topping

=== 2024 ===
The 2024 awards celebrated games released in 2023. The awards ceremony was hosted at the Bremen Theater in Copenhagen on April 30, 2024, and it was hosted by Marie Høst.

Game of the Year: Cocoon – Geometric Interactive; Figment 2: Creed Valley – Bedtime Digital Games; The Magical Mixture Mill – Glowlight; Rytmos – Floppy Club; What the Car? – Triband	Best Live Game (Free-to-Play): Lily's Garden – Tactile Games; Airline Manager – Trophy Games; Money City – PortaPlay; MovieStarPlanet 2 – MovieStarPlanet; Slap Battles – Tencell; Subway Surfers – SYBO
Best Live Game (Premium): Hitman World of Assassination – IO Interactive; Deep Rock Galactic – Ghost Ship Games; Gerda: A Flame in Winter - Liva's Story – Bird Island / PortaPlay; Necesse – Fair Games; Trailmakers – Flashbulb Games	Best Game Design: Cocoon – Geometric Interactive; Figment 2: Creed Valley – Bedtime Digital Games; The Magical Mixture Mill – Glowlight; Rytmos – Floppy Club; Void Crew – Hutlihut Games; What the Car? – Triband
Best Kids Game: What the Car? – Triband; Figment 2: Creed Valley – Bedtime Digital Games; The Messy King – Peasoup; OddBallers – Game Swing	Best Narrative: Figment 2: Creed Valley – Bedtime Digital Games; Cocoon – Geometric Interactive; The Messy King – Peasoup; Midnight Girl – Italic; Saltsea Chronicles – Die Gute Fabrik
Best Visuals: Cocoon – Geometric Interactive; Figment 2: Creed Valley – Bedtime Digital Games; The Magical Mixture Mill – Glowlight; Midnight Girl – Italic; Saltsea Chronicles – Die Gute Fabrik; What the Car? – Triband	Best Audio: Figment 2: Creed Valley – Bedtime Digital Games; Cocoon – Geometric Interactive; Rytmos – Floppy Club; What the Car? – Triband
Best Debut: The Magical Mixture Mill – Glowlight; Runic Survivor – Steelduck Studios; Rytmos – Floppy Club; Void Crew – Hutlihut Games

==== Talents of the Year ====
Name	Title	Company
Sandra Andén	Animator	Ghost Ship Games
Javier Casado De Amúa	Game Engineer	Hutlihut Games
Johan August Christiansen	Artist	Triheart Studio
Simon Dannevang	Project & QA Manager	Bird Island/Portaplay
Jeppe Faber	Programmer	Flatponies
Anna Victoria Lie Fjellerup	Legal Student Worker	SYBO
Mathias Halilovic	Gameplay Lead	Cindercat Games
Aaron Hathaway	Marketing Content Writer	Ghost Ship Games
Christian Bank Johnsen	Gameplay Programmer	Cindercat Games
Frederika Karlsson	Junior Animator	SYBO
Nicolai Wenceslaus Kriesz	Junior Game Designer	SYBO
Lukas Julian Lentz	Sound Designer	Geometric Interactive
Erik Lindskoug	Programmer	Invisible Walls
Joachim Nyholm	Sound Designer	Ghost Ship Games
Kristian Dam Pedersen	Data Engineer	Raw Power Games
Sarah Sander	Community Manager	Triband
Simon Stormes	Gameplay Programmer	Fair Games
Casper Taro	Sound Designer	Flatponies
Perina Torbarina	Associate Producer	IO Interactive

=== 2025 ===
The 2025 awards celebrated games released in 2024. The submission period for games closed on January 6, 2025, and for talents on February 1, 2025. The awards ceremony was hosted at the Bella Center in Copenhagen on February 14, 2025.

Game of the Year: SpellRogue – Guidelight Games; Miniatures – Other Tales Interactive; One Btn Bosses – Midnight Munchies; Security: The Horrible Nights – Professional Villains	Best Live Game: What the Car? – Triband; Deep Rock Galactic – Ghost Ship Games; Hitman World of Assassination – IO Interactive; Subway Surfers – SYBO; Trailmakers – Flashbulb Games; Trench Warfare WW1 – Simplebit Studios; Void Crew – Hutlihut Games
Best Kids Game: Calcium Chaos: Derailed – Lunch Money Games; Deathbeard's Curse – Peasoup; Football Game – Dwarf / Benny Box; Mouse & Crane – Those Eyes; Rebots – Flatponies	Best Game Design: SpellRogue – Guidelight Games; Miniatures – Other Tales Interactive; One Btn Bosses – Midnight Munchies; Rebots – Flatponies; Security: The Horrible Nights – Professional Villains; Wild Indigo Ranch – Funday Games
Best Leap of Faith: Escape the Arcade – Julie Normann Bjørnskov; Deathbeard's Curse – Peasoup; Ultimate Mingle – Sweet and Psycho Studios	Best Audio: Airhead – Octato; Calcium Chaos: Derailed – Lunch Money Games; Miniatures – Other Tales Interactive; One Btn Bosses – Midnight Munchies; Rebots – Flatponies; Security: The Horrible Nights – Professional Villains; Wild Indigo Ranch – Funday Games
Best Visuals: Miniatures – Other Tales Interactive; Airhead – Octato; Rebots – Flatponies; Security: The Horrible Nights – Professional Villains; SpellRogue – Guidelight Games; Wild Indigo Ranch – Funday Games	Best Narrative: Security: The Horrible Nights – Professional Villains; Deathbeard's Curse - Peasoup; Miniatures – Other Tales Interactive; Mouse & Crane – Those Eyes; Rebots – Flatponies; Wild Indigo Ranch – Funday Games
Best Debut: One Btn Bosses – Midnight Munchies; Airhead – Octato; Calcium Chaos: Derailed – Lunch Money Games; The Duck Pond – Quack People; SpellRogue – Guidelight Games	Denmark's Favorite Game: Wild Indigo Ranch – Funday Games; Other nominees: Airhead – Octato; Backpack Brawl – Rapidfire Games; Calcium Chaos: Derailed – Lunch Money Games; Cellfish – Brtl Games; Corporate Cut: The Hair-Raising Adventure of an Office Employee – Hairington Games; Deathbeard's Curse - Peasoup; Deep Rock Galactic – Ghost Ship Games; The Duck Pond – Quack People; Escape the Arcade – Julie Normann Bjørnskov; Football Game – Dwarf / Benny Box; Hitman World of Assassination – IO Interactive; Miniatures – Other Tales Interactive; Mouse & Crane – Those Eyes; Necesse – Fair Games; One Btn Bosses – Midnight Munchies; Rebots – Flatponies; Security: The Horrible Nights – Professional Villains; SpellRogue – Guidelight Games; Subway Surfers – SYBO; Trailmakers – Flashbulb Games; Trench Warfare WW1 – Simplebit Studios; Truck Manager – Trophy Games; Void Crew – Hutlihut Games; What the Car? – Triband

==== Talents of the Year ====
Name	Title	Company
Jesper Andersson	Programmer	Flatponies
Arvid Aspeborg	Junior 3D Artist	Ghost Ship Games
Amalie Bejstrup	Marketing & Community Manager	Cindercat Games
Mikkel Diget Eriksen	Technical Animator	Cindercat Games
Jacob Fransson	Junior 3D Artist	Ghost Ship Games
Ditte Galsgaard Frederiksen	Character Artist	Cindercat Games
Katya Grebennikova	People & Culture Assistance	Ghost Ship Games
Jonas Halver	Core Game Developer	Mrs. Wordsmith
Katarina Ankjær Helstrup	Animator	Invisible Walls
Aske Valdemar Szlavik Johansen	Community Content Manager	Triband
Neil McGuiness	Technical Game Designer	PortaPlay
Pax Meier	Game Designer	Lunch Money Games
Rasmus Mogensen	2D Artist	Lunch Money Games
Radu Nenu	Junior Technical Designer	IO Interactive

== Records ==
=== Most Spilprisens won by a game ===
Awards	Game Name	Developer
5	Deep Rock Galactic	Ghost Ship Games
5	Hitman World of Assassination	IO Interactive
4	Echo	Ultra Ultra
4	Forced	BetaDwarf
4	Inside	Playdead
3	Affordable Space Adventures	NapNok Games / Nifflas
3	Cocoon	Geometric Interactive
3	Forgotton Anne	ThroughLine Games
3	Sofus & the Moon Machine	The Outer Zone

=== Most Spilprisens won by a developer ===
Awards	Developer
11	IO Interactive
5	Ghost Ship Games
4	Bedtime Digital Games
4	BetaDwarf
4	Nifflas
4	Playdead
4	The Outer Zone
4	Triband
4	Ultra Ultra
