= Thoth (video game) =

2016 shooter video game

THOTH
- Developer: Jeppe Carlsen
- Publisher: Double Fine Productions
- Engine: Unity
- Platforms: Microsoft Windows, macOS, Switch
- Release: Windows, macOS: WW: October 7, 2016; Switch: WW: October 10, 2020
- Genre: Multi-directional shooter
- Modes: Single-player, multiplayer

Thoth (stylised as THOTH) is an abstract shoot 'em up video game created by Jeppe Carlsen, former lead gameplay designer of Playdead games Limbo and Inside. It is published by Double Fine Productions.

== Development ==
As a solo developer, Carlsen had previously worked on independent platformer 140. Carlsen had thought about designing a game inspired by Geometry Wars: Retro Evolved and Robotron: 2084 before he started working on Limbo.

Music for the game was composed by experimental composers SØS Gunver Ryberg and Cristian Vogel.

== Gameplay ==
Progress through the levels of the game is made by eliminating all enemies. Doing so transforms them into ghostly voids that relentlessly chase the player. The game can be played solo or with two players cooperatively; when playing with a second player, the first player to die will become a ghost void that haunts the player. The main sequence of levels are divided into sets of four, each introducing new enemy types and game mechanics. If the main 64 levels are completed, the player gains access to procedurally generated levels.
