= Gerda: A Flame in Winter =

2022 video game

- Developer: PortaPlay
- Publisher: Don't Nod
- Director: Hans von Knut Skovfoged
- Producers: Hans von Knut Skovfoged; David Karpantschof
- Designer: Shalev Moran
- Programmers: Magnus Barbier; Sonne Storbjerg; Lukas Wendt
- Artists: Caroline Fangel; Jakob Hansson
- Writers: Ida Broni Christensen; Damir Omić
- Composer: Jakob Støvring Hansen
- Engine: Unity
- Platforms: Nintendo Switch; Windows
- Release: 1 September 2022
- Genres: Adventure, Role-playing
- Mode: Single-player

Gerda: A Flame in Winter is an adventure role-playing video game developed by PortaPlay and published by Don't Nod. It was released on 1 September 2022 for Nintendo Switch and Windows.

== Gameplay ==
The player controls nurse Gerda Larsen and selects dialogue choices that affect her relations with the four factions, Occupation, Resistance, Danes and Germans.

== Plot ==
Gerda: A Flame in Winter is set in Tinglev in Southern Jutland, Denmark, during the German occupation of Denmark in World War II in 1945. Gerda is Danish-German, with a German father and a Danish mother, and lives with her husband Anders. During the game, Gerda finds Anders has been arrested by the Gestapo and has left behind documents from the resistance movement.

== Development and release ==
Creative director Hans von Knut Skovfoged said the game is inspired by his grandmother smuggling weapons for the Danish resistance movement.

The game's visual style was based on the work of the late–19th century Danish Impressionists known as the Skagen Painters.

Gerda: A Flame in Winter was developed by Danish developer PortaPlay and published by Don't Nod as their first third-party game. It was announced at the Nintendo Indie World Showcase in December 2021. The release on 1 September for Microsoft Windows and Nintendo Switch was announced in May 2022. A downloadable content (DLC), Liva's Story, was released on 23 May 2023. (Note: PortaPlay rebranded as Bird Island Games at the time of Liva's Story release.)

== Reception ==
Politiken praised the balance between of its storytelling, but disliked the 3D models quality. Le Monde praised the game's narrative choices. The Escapist said the game isn't notably visually appealing but the "RPG-lite" elements added a "sense of urgency" and strategy to decisions.

At the Games for Change Awards 2023, Gerda: A Flame in Winter won Best Narrative and was nominated for Most Significant Impact.

At the Danish Game Awards Spilprisen 2023, Gerda won Best Narrative.
