= Lego Bricktales =

2022 video game

- Developer: ClockStone Studio
- Publisher: Thunderful Publishing
- Engine: Unity
- Platforms: Linux; macOS; Nintendo Switch; PlayStation 4; PlayStation 5; Windows; Xbox One; Xbox Series X/S; Android; iOS; Meta Quest 2; Meta Quest 3; Meta Quest Pro
- Release: Linux, macOS, Windows, Switch, PS4, PS5, Xbox One, Xbox Series X/S; 12 October 2022; Android, iOS; 27 April 2023; Meta Quest 2, 3, Pro; 7 December 2023
- Genre: Puzzle adventure
- Mode: Single-player

Lego Bricktales is a puzzle adventure game developed by ClockStone Studio and published by Thunderful Publishing. It was released for Linux, macOS, Nintendo Switch, PlayStation 4, PlayStation 5, Windows, Xbox One and Xbox Series X/S on 12 October 2022, and for Android and iOS on 27 April 2023. A virtual/mixed reality version was released for Meta Quest 2, 3 and Pro on 7 December 2023. Lego Bricktales received generally positive reviews.

== Gameplay ==
Lego Bricktales is a puzzle adventure game. The player explores five unique diorama biomes (Jungles, Deserts, Cities, Medieval Castle and Caribbean Islands), solving puzzles and helping Lego minifigures. The Sandbox Mode allows players to create their Lego buildings and vehicles. The main narrative of the game sees the player helping their grandfather, an inventor, to restore his amusement park and get it up to code.

== Development and release ==
Lego Bricktales was developed by ClockStone Studio, the developers of the Bridge Constructor video game series and published by Thunderful in 2019. The ClockStone Studio had refined its building mechanic, scrutinized its puzzle design and strengthened the script. Lego Builder's Journey developers helped the Lego Bricktales developers to recreate the game in a digital game. Clockstone founder Tri Do Dinh explained, "It was definitely an inspiration, like we were aware of it even back then when it was only available on mobile," and continued, "We didn't really dive too deeply into the details of it. We did have some exchange."

Announced in September 2022, the game was released for Windows, Linux, MacOS, Nintendo Switch, PlayStation 4, PlayStation 5, Xbox One and Xbox Series X/S on 12 October 2022. In addition, versions for Android and iOS were released on 27 April 2023. A virtual reality version of the game with mixed reality capabilities was announced at the Meta Connect event on 27 September 2023 and released for Meta Quest 2, Meta Quest 3 and Meta Quest Pro on 7 December 2023.

=== Downloadable content ===
A downloadable content pack, "Easter content", was released in April 2023. It adds an Easter diorama, with a storyline that allows players to help the Easter bunny save Easter. It includes five construction puzzles, one collection quest, three wardrobe items and one music track.

In addition, a downloadable content pack, "Summer content", was released in July 2023. It adds a Summer diorama, with a storyline that allows players to save a Summer music festival. It includes five construction puzzles, one traversal puzzle, three wardrobe items and two music tracks.

== Reception ==
Reception

Aggregate score
Aggregator	Score
Metacritic	NS: 68/100; PC: 75/100; PS5: 69/100; XSX: 72/100; MQ: 84/100

Review scores
Publication	Score
Eurogamer	3/5
GameSpot	8/10
GamesRadar+	3.5/5
IGN	7/10
Nintendo Life	6/10
Nintendo World Report	7/10
PC Gamer (US)	75/100
Push Square	8/10
Shacknews	6/10
The Games Machine (Italy)	8.7/10
VG247	4/5

The PC and Meta Quest versions of Lego Bricktales received "generally favorable" reviews, according to review aggregator website Metacritic, and the other platforms received "mixed or average" reviews.

IGN gave the game a 7 out of 10, saying "Building brick structures feels almost as good on the screen as it does in real life but frustrated by limited camera controls or an obscure objective." GameSpot gave the game an 8 out of 10, saying "Lego Bricktales functions like a STEM toy, teaching some basic engineering principles in a fun and engaging way, just like actual Lego bricks." Eurogamer's Tom Phillips gave the game a 3/5 and stated "It's a simple adventure game with a fun creative mode." Nintendo World Report gave the game a 7 out of 10, saying "Bricktales's focus on creativity and puzzle solving makes it feel more grounded than the fantastical Lego Star Wars and Marvel games."

Mitch Vogel for Nintendo Life gave the game a six out of ten star rating and commented, "Lego Bricktales isn't perfect, but it offers up a refreshingly unique experience relative to the litany of action platformers based on licensed IP we've been getting for nearly two decades now. We sincerely appreciated the focus on low-stress building puzzles that encourage and reward creative solutions. It's the kind of game that you just take at your own pace and lose yourself for a bit to the relaxing tunes and simple act of building. It's a shame, then, that awkward controls hamper your creativity and hold it back from greatness. Couple that with performance issues on Switch, and we'd recommend playing on PC if you can. Still, Bricktales is the closest thing in years that a Lego video game has gotten to the actual feeling of playing with Lego, and those of you who appreciate the famous toy will find something to love here."

Joey Thurmond for Common Sense Media gave the game a four out of five star rating and commented, "A lack of guidance can also confuse players with some puzzles and story objectives, not to mention several truly challenging builds that will stretch your creative muscles and patience. Even if there's unnecessary padding with fetch quests here and there as well, Lego Bricktales includes dozens of wonderfully designed building puzzles and brainteasers that test your environmental awareness and ordering skills."

Matt Gardner of Forbes criticized the game for its camera. XboxEra gave the game an 8/10 for Xbox Series X version and stated, "Great variety in gameplay." Screen Rant gave the game a 3.5/5 and stated, "Lego Bricktales, much like the similar Lego Builder's Journey, is a great little puzzle game that provides a real sense of Lego building to the player. The customization and cute story keep the game interesting and the sandbox mode is a great way to practice building real Lego sets. There is never just one specific answer to a puzzle and mixing things up makes for a fun and enjoyable game that would work for Lego fans of any age."

Helen Ashcroft from Thegamer gave the game a 3.5/5 for PC version and stated, "decent-length story mode, some interesting puzzles, and a few extras for those who want them." PSU gave the game a 9/10 for PlayStation 5 version and stated, "Lego Bricktales is all about firing up the imagination to construct Lego to solve challenges as you subconsciously grin with the sort of wide-eyed wonder that Lego has always prided itself on inciting in builders both young and old."

Paste stated "Lego Bricktales' sumptuous environments and largely clever puzzles shine despite its occasionally safe, repetitive design and difficult controls, though." Slash Gear gave the game a 6/10, saying "Gorgeous design."

=== Accolades ===
Year	Award	Category	Result	Ref.
2022	Deutscher Entwicklerpreis	Best Casual Game	Won	
2022	Deutscher Entwicklerpreis	Best Game Design	Won	
2022	Deutscher Entwicklerpreis	Best Graphics	Won	
