= The Forest Quartet =

2022 video game

- Steam version digital art
- Developers: Mads & Friends
- Publisher: Bedtime Digital Games
- Designer: Mads Vadsholt
- Composer: Kaspar Vadsholt
- Platforms: PlayStation 4; PlayStation 5; Windows; Nintendo Switch
- Release: 8 December 2022
- Genres: Adventure, Puzzle
- Mode: Single-player

The Forest Quartet is a 2022 video game created by Danish independent developer Mads Vadsholt under the name Mads and Friends, and published by Bedtime Digital Games. The game is a puzzle-based adventure game in which the player is a spirit tasked to reunite the members of her former band by reinvigorating life into the forest they inhabit. Players float around three stages and interact with items to complete puzzles that inspire the band members to move on, by illuminating the darkness of the forest and putting out fires. Upon release, the game received average reviews, with critics praising the game's audiovisual design and relationship between graphics and sound, whilst critiquing the challenge and complexity of its puzzle gameplay. The Forest Quartet was recognized for its audio design by winning the 'Excellence in Audio' award at the 2023 Independent Games Festival.

== Gameplay ==
A screenshot of gameplay in The Forest Quartet.

The game is puzzle game in which the player navigates three stages to complete puzzles, each based around reuniting one of the three band members. The player can float across stages and use Nina's voice to manipulate objects, press buttons, and collect items to activate objects. In the first stage, the player assembles machinery by locating and assembling cables and manipulating valves and dials to power large generators. In the second stage, the player activates light bulbs that illuminate the darkness of the forest. In the final stage, the player transforms into a swarm of butterflies to navigate a series of pipes to direct the flow of water to put out forest fires.

== Plot ==
The titular Forest Quartet was a jazz band in Denmark led by singer and saxophonist Nina, who has recently died after an illness; the remaining trio has announced a final tribute concert to her in the forest where the four musicians moved to from the city on Nina's insistence, but the isolation and grief has gotten the better of the three, and the player must guide Nina's spirit to help them resolve their mental health issues, which manifest in various forms in Nina's spirit world: American pianist Kirk's depression appears as black blobs enveloping his environment, French bassist Jean-Baptiste ("JB") has anxiety that manifests as lumbering - albeit harmless - black creatures, and drummer Sebastian has anger issues materializing as a wildfire.

After Nina's invisible interventions, Kirk and JB eventually call each other, and convince each other to do the gig, but Sebastian doesn't pick up his phone by the time of the concert; the two apologize to the audience and decide to go through the forest to Sebastian's house to fetch him; on the way, both Kirk and JB have mild panic attacks, to which Nina has to intervene. When they arrive, Sebastian reluctantly agrees to participate, but on the way back, the three almost change their minds due to their emotional friction, until they stumble upon Nina's grave. Admitting she held them together, they apologize to each other and say a final goodbye to her, and perform the concert, with Nina's spirit finally able to find peace.

== Development ==
The Forest Quartet was created by Danish independent developer Mads Vadsholt under the name Mads and Friends. Vadsholt was a computer graphics and animation graduate from The Animation Workshop in Viborg, and developed the game from 2016, with most of the development period involving independent part-time work on the game. Vadsholt cited the game as a personal work relating to growing up in a family of musicians and that the game became "very much about my own grief and the life of my family", inspired by his mother's death from cancer in 2013. Development of the game was supported by several grants, including the Danish Film Institute Games Scheme and the Danish Arts Foundation, allowing Vadsholt to hire additional artists and animators for the game. Vadsholt also involved several friends and family members in development, such as sister Nina Vadsholt, who provided voice acting for the game's main character, and jazz bassist Kaspar Vadsholt, the father of the developer, who composed the game's soundtrack, performed by members of the Copenhagen band The Danish Radio Big Band. To promote The Forest Quartet, publisher Bedtime Digital Games launched a pre-release party in which the soundtrack of the game was performed in a forest in Gisselfeld.

== Reception ==
Reception

Aggregate score
Aggregator	Score
Metacritic	71%

Review scores
Publication	Score
Edge	7/10
The Guardian	4/5 stars
Gaming Age	B−
Multiplayer.it	7.0

The Forest Quartet received "mixed or average reviews", according to review aggregator Metacritic. The game received praise for its soundtrack. The Guardian described the game's music as "phenomenal", citing the game's mixture of genres and tone as a "wonderfully apt musical ode to the confusing aftermath of death". Edge highlighted the game's "forlorn" and "ethereal soundscapes". Multiplayer.it commended the game's sound design for recovering "the magic underlying music and jazz", citing its use of improvisation and fragmentation to symbolize the game's themes of loss and death. However, Gaming Age found the music to be "awfully forgettable" and "nothing special", citing the band's music only being played at the end of the game.

Critics also praised the game's visual presentation and connection to the audio design. The Guardian described the art as "striking" and "painterly", finding the animations to be "playful and intuitive". Edge highlighted the game's "distinctive setting" and its interactive animation as "enlivened by the musicality of the environment". 4Players commended the game's "great atmosphere", highlighting its "panoramas and scenes" and "convincing" use of "attractive warm light". In contrast, Gaming Age felt the graphics left "something to be desired".

Several critics were lukewarm on the narrative and treatment of its subject matter on grief and loss, but many felt the game could have explored them further. Edge found the game to be elevated from other titles dealing with grief "in both form and tone", describing the game's treatment of its themes as done "with understatement and wit", and the ending being "touching yet hopeful". 4Players acknowledged the game's "important topic" and "soulful implementation" of its themes, but found the representation of mourning to be abstract and "not particularly effective". Multiplayer.it expressed interest in the game's characterization and its use of interview to "open a window on the lives of the musicians", but "would have liked to hear more".

Reviewers were mixed on the design of the puzzles, with most agreeing they were not the centerpiece of the game's experience. Edge noted the puzzles were "straightforward enough to allow the story to flow", but did not feel "insultingly simple". Multiplayer.it praised the game's "simple but clever puzzles", but noted their structure was "very linear and not at all complex". Despite noting the "surprising" variation in puzzles, 4Players noted that they lacked "ambition" and could be "solved very quickly". Gaming Age described the puzzles as "linear" and not "remotely challenging".

=== Accolades ===
The Forest Quartet received the 'Excellence in Audio' award at the 2023 Independent Games Festival.
