= The Silent Age =

Point and click adventure video game

- The icon of the game
- Developer: House on Fire
- Producer: Uni Dahl
- Designer: Thomas Ryder
- Programmer: Linda Randazzo
- Writer: Anders Petersen
- Composer: Nevin Eronde
- Engine: Unity
- Platforms: iOS, Android, Windows Phone Kindle Fire, Windows, Mac, PlayStation Vita (unofficial)
- Release: Episode 1: December 6, 2012; Episode 2: October 16, 2014
- Genre: Point and click adventure game
- Mode: Single-player

The Silent Age is a point and click adventure game, developed by Danish indie game studio House on Fire, and released for iOS, Android, Windows Phone, Kindle Fire, Windows, Mac. The game's story focuses on a janitor who is plunged into a task of saving humanity from an apocalyptic event by using time travel, discovering the future that will come about if the event is not prevented. The game was originally released as two episodes, before both were packaged together for sale, and received positive reviews from critics upon its release.

== Gameplay ==
The Silent Age functions on a simple point and click interface, in which players can interact with specific objects when the cursor is over them, and must solve a series of puzzles to advance, mainly by finding items needed to overcome obstacles. The main element of play includes a portable time machine that allows the protagonist to shift between the present and the future, allowing them to find objects in both to solve puzzles in each era. The game is divided into chapters, with each requiring the player to complete puzzles in order to advance to the next one. An example might be trying to find a way to open a door, and locating the means by time-travelling to locate an object that can overcome this.

== Plot ==
In 1972, a janitor named Joe works for the American company Archon. One day, his superiors assign him to take over the duties of his co-worker Frank, who has left the company. While cleaning the company's basement laboratories, Joe finds an elderly man dying in a chamber housing an odd device. The man identifies himself as Dr. Lambert, and that he is from the future attempting to prevent an extinction event. Before dying, Lambert hands Joe a portable time machine and instructs him to find his younger self and explain to him what happened that day. When Joe attempts to leave the laboratories, company security arrests him for industrial espionage and hand him over to the police. During his interrogation at the police station, Joe uses the device and finds himself in the ruins of the building in the future, discovering that humanity went extinct after 1972.

Heeding Lambert's instructions, Joe uses time travel to move through the city, eventually locating where the young Lambert resides. Lambert confronts Joe as an intruder, until he is shown the time machine and recognises his own handiwork. Lambert reveals to Joe that he developed time travel for Archon, who in turn sold it to the Department of Defense, who initially wanted to use it to extinguish communism before it was founded. Since the laws of causality prevent using the time machine to travel to any point before its own invention, Archon convinced the DoD they could instead bring back advanced weapons from the future. However, all of Archon's time pilots returned claiming that humanity had been wiped out by an advanced disease. Lambert refused to be involved in Archon's attempts to acquire this disease for use as a bioweapon and went into seclusion shortly afterwards.

Learning from Joe that Archon will inadvertently bring about humanity's extinction, Lambert configures the time machine to send Joe back to the previous night and sabotage the company's supercomputer. Joe returns to Archon and succeeds in this while avoiding his past self. Checking on the body of the future Lambert, he discovers that the scientist is still clinging to life, having feigned his death in order to speak to Joe and reveal that someone has already used the company's machine. Modifying the portable time machine, Lambert sends Joe to the far future. There he finds Frank in a makeshift camp, dying from the virus.

Frank reveals he was a Soviet spy. When he discovered what Archon was working on, he doubted its truth but continued to gather information on time travel, until he got caught, and used the company's time machine to escape. Frank gives Joe the fuse for the machine so he can return to 1972, but upon his arrival Joe realizes that he is infected with the virus and will be the cause of the extinction event. Left with little time and no other choice, Joe manages to use one of the company's cryonic chambers to avoid infecting everyone. He eventually awakens in 2012, and learns from a doctor that Archon went bankrupt, that the other time pilots have lost their sanity, and that the disease (of which he was cured during his revival) was a rare form of avian flu. Joe accepts an offer to enjoy the opportunities of the 21st century, and begins a new life.

== Reception ==
Reception

Aggregate score
Aggregator	Score
Metacritic	iOS: 84/100 iOS (Episode 2): 81/100

The game has received mostly positive reviews. As of December 2014, Metacritic lists a score of 84 (out of 100) for Episode 1, and a score of 81 (out of 100) for Episode 2, both ratings of "generally favorable reviews". Regarding the first episode, the one initially released in 2012, critics are in favor of the game's puzzle and graphics design, but criticized it for its short gameplay. Episode 2, which was released on October 16, 2014, received mostly positive reviews from critics. Gamezebo gives it 4.5 out of 5 stars, stating that the episode serves as a "satisfying conclusion to Joe's story and the time-traveling mystery", while pointing out flaws in the episode's puzzle design. Pocket Gamer gives the episode a score of 7/10. Ragequit.gr gave the game 84/100 saying that the game is "Very well written and beautifully presented, House on Fire's debut will absolutely thrill fans of darker, more mature science fiction." Multiplayer.it gives the game 8/10 stating that "Rich in style and atmosphere, with a compelling plot and nice minimalist graphics, The Silent Age is a solid attempt at the point-and-click adventure genre."

== See also ==
- Time travel
- Puzzle video game
