= What the Car? =

2023 video game

WHAT THE CAR?
- Developer: Triband
- Publisher: Triband
- Engine: Unity
- Platforms: iOS, macOS, tvOS, Windows
- Release: iOS, macOS, tvOS: WW: 4 May 2023; Windows: WW: 9 September 2024
- Genre: Racing
- Mode: Single-player

What the Car? (stylized in all caps) is a 2023 video game developed and published by Triband. It was originally released for iOS, macOS and tvOS via Apple Arcade in 2023 and in September 2024 for Windows. Players control a car to guide it the end of a series of levels in parodies of multiple genres, with its methods of movement and control changing in unexpected and comic ways.

Triband intended the game to be a follow-up to What the Golf?, with the objective of creating a humorous title that subverted the conventions of a racing game. Upon release, the game received generally favorable reviews, with critics praising the game's sense of humor and varied gameplay modes based on its concept. Following release, What the Car? received several accolades, including the 2024 D.I.C.E. Award for Mobile Game of the Year.

== Gameplay ==
Each level of What the Car changes the player's car to move in different ways, including with legs or rockets as pictured.

The objective of each level is to guide the player's car from the start to the finish of the course as fast as possible. Players control the car by using an onscreen gear stick on the right to move forward or backward and steering wheel on the left. In each level, the car changes form and can be moved in different and unexpected ways: for instance, floating with an umbrella, rolling like a ball, or running and jumping with a pair of legs. An additional action button can be pressed or held to activate the car's modifications in a given level. Upon completion of a level, the player is awarded a bronze, silver or gold crown depending on their finish time. One collectible card can be found in each level, often requiring players to locate and navigate through a detour or short-cut. The game features eleven episodes (Jumping, Working, Sports, Longer, Driving, Water, Party, Sandstorm, Sneaky, Car-Mong Us, and Goatville) based around a specific theme, with players navigating between levels in an episode using an overworld, which also branch off to optional levels

== Development ==
What the Car? was developed by Copenhagen-based independent studio Triband. The game is a successor to the developer's 2019 title What the Golf?, a golf-based puzzle video game. Humor was an important objective, with the intent to create a comedic title that had a "complete disregard for any realism, car fans, and actual vehicles". Creative director Tim Garbos and lead designer Lasse Astrup discussed that the inspiration for the game came from imagining outrageous scenarios from the team members' inability to drive a car. The developers focused the design of the game on subverting expectations about cars and "every rule a racing game is supposed to have", although expanded the scope of the game to "everyday objects and how we can imagine them". What the Car? was initially released exclusively for the Apple Arcade on 4 May 2023 for iOS devices, with Apple funding the development of the game for inclusion on the service. In April 2024, a Windows version of the game was announced for Steam alongside the release of a demo. Multiple themed updates were released to support the title, including crossovers with RAC7's Sneaky Sasquatch and Coffee Stain's Goat Simualator.

== Reception ==
Reception

Aggregate score
Aggregator	Score
Metacritic	76%

Review scores
Publication	Score
Edge	7/10
Shacknews	7/10
Metro	8/10
Multiplayer.it	7.5/10
The Escapist	Recommended
TechRaptor	8/10

According to review aggregator website Metacritic, What the Car? received "generally favorable" reviews. The game's silliness and sense of humor was praised, with several critics comparing the game's short, humorous gameplay format to the WarioWare series. Edge enjoyed the game's subversive nature, highlighting its "consistent creativity" and "knack of locating unlikely riffs from its central conceit". The Escapist enjoyed the game's "abstract and irreverent" humor, although felt it may not appeal to all players.

However, some reviews considered the levels to vary in their execution. Edge assessed that some ideas were "markedly more entertaining than others", which could have "stayed on the cutting room floor". Similarly, ShackNews found some concepts less humorous or repetitive. The Escapist considered the unexpected impact of the game was not as effective for players familiar with the series. Some critics found the game's physics to be unreliable, with TechRaptor critiquing the game's "floaty feeling", its "weird" momentum and tendency for the car to "get stuck" on scenery objects.

=== Accolades ===
What the Car? won Mobile Game of the Year at the 27th Annual D.I.C.E. Awards, and Mobile Game of the Year Gamescom Latam 2024. The game was also nominated as a finalist for the 2024 Apple Design Awards in the 'Delight and Fun' category.

Year	Award	Category	Result	Ref.
2024	D.I.C.E Awards	Mobile Game of the Year	Won	
