= Hex Frvr =

2015 puzzle video game

- Developer: Chris Benjaminsen
- Platforms: Browser, iOS, Android
- Release: 13 August 2015
- Genre: Tile-matching video game
- Mode: Single-player

Hex Frvr (stylized Hex FRVR) is a puzzle video game released in 2015, created by indie developer Chris Benjaminsen. The player is given an empty hexagon-shaped board, and must strategically place pieces on it to fill in lines of tiles. It started as a test, but unexpectedly went viral after Benjaminsen released it.

== Gameplay ==
The title "HEX FRVR" stands for "Hexagon Fever". Players can choose one of three pieces to add onto an empty board at a time, made up of several small tiles. Linking tiles in a line from one edge of the board to another will remove all the tiles in the completed line, and finishing several lines at once will create a combo for extra points. The game ends when the player can no longer place anymore tiles.

== Development ==
Hex Frvr was created by Chris Benjaminsen as a way to test his HTML5 skills. His first game was a version of solitaire, so he "wanted something different." The game was based on a minigame in Second Life. According to Chris Benjaminsen, "Quite a lot of my friends started losing sleep to the game, which is a pretty good indicator that you have a success on your hands." He also commented that "the game got even more addictive when sounds and music were added to the game". The game was released on Facebook and web browsers in August 2015, with the mobile versions releasing 4 October of the same year.

== Reception ==
When Benjaminsen promoted the game on Reddit, it got over 1,500 comments and started to go viral. According to Benjaminsen, the Reddit post was "definitely what made the game explode. While I have been successful with distribution before, I have never done anything like this." After five days of being released, Chris Benjaminsen revealed that "players have spent just above 4 full years (1,598 days) playing the game".

Tom Senior wrote an article for PC Gamer titled "Hex FRVR: the perfect procrastination puzzle game", stating "It's so quick and simple that I can't stop playing it." The game has been noted by many players to be addictive.
