= Expeditions: Conquistador =

2013 video game

- Cover art for the download version
- Developer: Logic Artists
- Publisher: BitComposer
- Composer: Leonardo Badinella
- Engine: Unity
- Platforms: Linux; Windows; OS X Windows Phone
- Release: WW: May 30, 2013
- Genre: Tactical role-playing
- Modes: Single-player, multiplayer

Expeditions: Conquistador is a 2013 squad-based tactical role-playing game developed by Danish developer Logic Artists and released by BitComposer for Windows, Linux and Macintosh on May 30, 2013. The player takes the role of a Spanish conquistador leading an expedition to Hispaniola and Mexico in 1518 to 1520. The game features resource management, a branching storyline, and interactive fiction elements. Expeditions: Conquistador was partially funded by Kickstarter. Logic Artists has released two further Expeditions games: Expeditions: Viking in 2017, and Expeditions: Rome in 2022. THQ Nordic acquired the Expeditions Series intellectual property (IP) in November 2018.

== Gameplay ==
Expeditions: Conquistador is set during the Age of Discovery. The player's goal is to mount an expedition from Spain to Hispaniola and Mexico, amassing gold and influence while building and sustaining a strong expedition force. The game concludes with the player's return to Spain. During the course of the expedition, the player has the opportunity to influence the fate of the explored lands. The game is set in an alternate history that allows the player's choices to diverge from historical events.

The player character does not participate in combat and has five non-combat player stats: tactics, diplomacy, healing, hunting and leadership. Player stats are assigned during character creation and do not level up, although in-game events and squad bonuses may modify them. Player stats open up options in dialogue events; they also influence various aspects of resource management, and allow the player to alter the starting conditions of battles.

The game includes text and dialogue driven quests with branching storylines.

The player begins the game by assembling an expedition of ten followers from pre-made characters. There are five Spanish character classes, each corresponding to common role-playing game combat archetypes: soldier (tank), scout (damage dealer), hunter (ranged combat), doctor (healer) and scholar (support unit). In addition to the five Spanish classes, the game has six native classes which the player can recruit during the game. Character classes have non-combat skills and each character has unique personality traits.

The expedition party has a pool of experience points used to level up followers to improve their skills and unlock new abilities.

Combat is turn-based and takes place on a hex grid. The player generally chooses up to six members of the expedition party to deploy on the battlefield.

== Development ==
Expeditions: Conquistador was developed by Danish developers Logic Artists, with a core team of 8 to 10 full-time developers and additional freelancers and interns. The game is based on a university project where the task was to create a game demo for a target audience of one person. The XNA demo was made in three weeks and was 2D and turn-based. Over a couple of months, the demo was turned into Conquistador Mobile, a gamebook-style strategy adventure game with branching narrative released for Windows Phone 7 in April, 2012. The developers began building Expeditions: Conquistador from scratch as a turn-based 3D role-playing game in April 2012, and BitComposer released the game on May 30, 2013.

The developers cite King's Bounty as an inspiration for the game's overall structure. They used the Heroes of Might and Magic series, the first two Fallout games and Dungeons & Dragons as inspiration for the combat. Troop management was inspired by Rainbow Six and X-COM.

The developers wanted to make a game where exploration was the central mechanical and narrative theme. They chose the Age of Exploration as an appropriate setting as the Spanish conquest of the Americas was underused in video games and was a historical period rich with conflict and narrative potential. They chose the Spanish perspective because it seemed more exciting, philosophically complex, and fresher than the English perspective.

Logic Artists ran a successful Kickstarter campaign to partially fund the game's development. The project raised $77,247 of its $70,000 goal.

== Reception ==
Reception

Aggregate score
Aggregator	Score
Metacritic	77/100

Review scores
Publication	Score
4Players	73/100
Destructoid	8.5/10
PC PowerPlay	7/10
Eurogamer.it	8/10
IGN Italia	8.5/10

Expeditions: Conquistador received "generally favorable" reviews according to review aggregator Metacritic.

Patrick Hancock of Destructoid praised the game's "excellent" writing and battle system, but criticised the game's difficulty level as being one that could wear a player down and make them think they were not progressing and also for being too difficult at the start of the game resulting in a feeling of "trial by fire"
