= Affordable Space Adventures =

2015 video game

- Developers: NapNok Games; Nifflas' Games
- Publisher: NapNok Games
- Engine: Unity
- Platform: Wii U
- Release: April 9, 2015
- Genres: Puzzle, adventure
- Modes: Single-player, multiplayer

Affordable Space Adventures is a puzzle adventure game developed and published by NapNok Games in collaboration with Nifflas' Games. The game was released for the Wii U via the Nintendo eShop download service on April 9, 2015. The game's main gameplay feature is its unique use of the Wii U GamePad to control a spaceship by using the controls shown on the touch-screen including two different engines and other controls.

== Plot ==
In Affordable Space Adventures, the player takes on the role of a customer who has purchased an "Affordable Space Adventure" from the company UExplore. The game begins with a video that describes a newly discovered planet ready to be explored by the company's customers, even promising to allow them to take ownership of and colonize their own individual piece of the planet. It introduces the customer to the Small Craft, their own personal vehicle with which they will explore the planet's surface, and describes the process by which the customer is to be placed on and retrieved from the planet. All along the way, UExplore extols the virtues of its perfect safety record - more specifically that they have had no "recorded" accidents in two decades.

An unexplained incident occurs between the end of the video and the start of the game, where the player awakens to discover that the mother ship has crashed into a hostile extraterrestrial environment, leaving the player no choice but to explore their environment. Along the way, the Small Craft slowly repairs its systems, bringing new functionality online at key points. The player is also informed of alien "artifacts" that they must avoid disturbing at all costs, under penalty of fines. The player searches for a functional distress beacon that will allow them to request emergency extraction. However, the beacons that the player finds are damaged or otherwise non-functional, forcing further exploration.

As the game proceeds, more promotional videos emerge from UExplore talking about how safe their program is - so much so, in fact, that the company's safety director was given an extended vacation.

The player eventually comes upon an alien installation that has the ability to alter reality in short bursts. The Small Craft penetrates this installation's defenses and causes a massive explosion, resulting in the ship being sent back to the surface, heavily damaged. The player sets off again in search of another beacon. The Small Craft begins to fall apart, system after system failing and shutting down until only the most basic systems are left online. The player finally discovers a working beacon in the middle of a harsh blizzard that, despite generating maximum heat, threatens to freeze the Small Craft solid. After filling out a casual survey form, the beacon puts the player in stasis to await extraction. In a short scene after the credits, the player's survey form (including their Miiverse drawing if provided) emerges from an interstellar fax machine in the long-unoccupied office of UExplore's safety director, ending up on the floor with numerous other calls for help.

== Gameplay ==
The goal of Affordable Space Adventures is to explore the environment of Spectaculon and find a means to request evacuation from the planet. The player controls the Small Craft, a small flying ship that can move around in two dimensions and interact with its environment in limited ways. A variety of systems are available to the player by pressing buttons on the gamepad and its touch screen, including a flashlight and scanner, two different engines, a mass generator, an anti-gravity device, several landing gears, etc. The gamepad thus functions as the Small Craft's control panel, both allowing the player to control the ship and tweak its systems, and conveying important information about the environment and the ship's functions.

The game is broken up into a series of levels consisting of puzzles of increasing complexity. Some puzzles require the player to open doors by pressing buttons hidden among the environment, while others are only passable by blocking lasers with objects found in the environment, or by sneaking past alien artifacts that will attack the Small Craft if it generates too much noise, heat or electrical radiation (a set of output meters indicate what each artifact's thresholds are after they are scanned).

Up to two additional players may join the game at the beginning using Wii Remotes or Wii Classic Controllers, taking over movement and scanning functions. The game also features two difficulty levels, Tourist and Technical, and a separate DLC pack, the Origin Story, consists of much harder levels.

== Origin Story DLC ==
In November 12 KnapNok Games released a free update for the game which fixed several bugs in the game as well as added five new levels in a separate mode named "Origin Story". The new levels were meant for experienced players who have already finished the game and were looking for a new challenge, though once the update has been installed, players can choose to play those new levels anytime.

== Reception ==
Reception

Aggregate score
Aggregator	Score
Metacritic	81/100

Review scores
Publication	Score
Destructoid	9/10
Game Informer	8/10
GameSpot	8/10
IGN	8.5/10
Nintendo Life	8/10

Upon launch, the game received generally positive reviews, with most media outlets calling out the integration of the Wii U's unique features. Patrick Hancock of Destructoid mentioned that "GamePad and Miiverse integration are perfect, and I'm not sure that sentence has been made before" and Thomas Whitehead of Nintendo Life claiming it to be "one of the eShop's top-tier games". Another aspect that got the attention of the media was the optional co-op multiplayer mode, which Andy Robertson of Forbes compared to live action Star Trek.

Affordable Space Adventures received several awards. Prior to launch, the game already received the "Best of PAX East 2015" award by Destructoid, and continued to receive subsequent awards after the game's launch. At the Danish SpilPrisen Awards in 2016, granted by the Danish Film Institute, the game received awards for "Game of the Year", "Best Technical Achievement" and "Best Game Design", while at the Nordic Game Awards 2016 the game won the "Best Game Design" award.
