= Cosmic Top Secret (video game) =

2018 adventure video game

- Developer: Klassefilm
- Publishers: Klassefilm; Nakana.io
- Director: Trine Laier
- Engine: Unity
- Platforms: Microsoft Windows; MacOS; Android iOS; Nintendo Switch; PlayStation 4 Xbox One
- Release: November 15, 2018
- Genre: Adventure
- Mode: Single-player

Cosmic Top Secret is a video game for PC and Mobile by Danish film- and game-production company Klassefilm. Released November 15, 2018, the game follows the experiences of the heroine Agent T in her search for answers, concerning her parents' involvement in the Danish Defence Intelligence Service during the Cold War. The game was later released on PlayStation 4, Xbox One, and Nintendo Switch on May 21, 2021, by indie game publisher Nakana.io.

== Story ==
Cosmic Top Secret is based on real documentary audio recordings made by Director Trine Laier. The recordings were made while she was trying to untangle the secrets of her father and mother's time in the Danish Intelligence.

Cosmic Top Secret is an autobiographical adventure video game about T. The player follows her journey to uncover the truth about her parents’ work with Danish Intelligence during the Cold War. What exactly was it that they did? The player controls T on her uncertain journey into adulthood and an atomic war that never happened but yet wounded a family. Surreal elements, human relationships, history, and secrecy come together to form a complex gaming experience.

== Art style ==
The world of Cosmic Top Secret is made to look like a cutout/puppet-theatre. All the characters are flat 2D puppets put in a 3D world. When moving the main character Agent T, she is rolled up in a paper ball, and moves along the ground, or is flicked into the air.

== Development ==
Cosmic Top Secret was first shown under the Danish name of Yderst Hemmeligt in 2012, as a graduation project by director Trine Laier at the National Film School of Denmark.

In 2013 the game received funding from Danish Film Institute to further develop the idea of a documentary game and redesigning the game as an adventure game.

=== Accolades ===
The game has garnered some attention at shows and conferences around the world.

Year	Award	Category	Recipient	Result	Ref.
2016	A MAZE Festival Berlin	Most Amazing Game Award	Cosmic Top Secret	Won	
2017	Indiecade Festival	The Culture Award	Cosmic Top Secret	Won	
2017	IDFA DocLab	Award for Digital Storytelling	Cosmic Top Secret	Won	
2018	Independent Games Festival	Seumas McNally Grand Prize	Cosmic Top Secret	Honorable Mention	
2018	Independent Games Festival	Excellence in Narrative	Cosmic Top Secret	Honorable Mention	
2018	Independent Games Festival	Nuovo Award	Cosmic Top Secret	Nominated	
2018	Digital Dozen	Breakthroughs in Storytelling Awards	Cosmic Top Secret	Finalist	
