= SYBO =

Danish video game company

SYBO Games
- Logo used since 2012
- Type: Subsidiary
- Industry: Video games
- Founded: 2010; 16 years ago In Holbæk, Denmark
- Founders: Bodie Jahn-Mulliner; Sylvester Rishøj Jensen
- Headquarters: Copenhagen, Denmark
- Key people: Mathias Gredal Nørvig (CEO); David Byrne (Chief Operations Officer); Philip Hickey (Chief Marketing Officer)
- Products: Subway Surfers; Blades of Brim; Subway Surfers Airtime; MarkAR; Subway Surfers Tag; Subway Surfers Blast; Subway Surfers Match; Subway Surfers+ Subway Surfers City
- Parent: Miniclip
- Website: sybogames.com

SYBO Games is a Danish video game company located in Copenhagen, Denmark founded by Sylvester Rishøj Jensen and Bodie Jahn-Mulliner, and SYBO is mainly known for being the creators and intellectual property owners of the most-downloaded mobile-runner game, Subway Surfers, which SYBO co-developed with Kiloo. SYBO has also released a second mobile runner game titled Blades of Brim. Like Subway Surfers, Blades of Brim is also an endless runner freemium title with in-app purchases. SYBO was among the first seven Snapchat games with Subway Surfers Airtime, released late 2019.

In June 2022, Miniclip agreed to buy SYBO in an undisclosed deal.

== Games popularity and TV production ==
One week after the release of Subway Surfers, the freemium running game for iOS had reached three million downloads and become the most downloaded game in 20 countries. Consequently, AppAdvice named it the Game of the Week for May 31, 2012. Four months later, Subway Surfers was available to Android users and quickly spread. The following month saw Subway Surfers rise into the top 20 growing Facebook apps by monthly active users. Eight months after the initial release, Subway Surfers landed 100 million downloads. By 2017, Subway Surfers was the most downloaded game across the globe. Furthermore, Subway Surfers is the first Android mobile game to cross one billion downloads in Google Play, a milestone reached in March 2018.

Today, the Subway Surfers runner game has been downloaded over 2.7 billion times averaging over 100 million active users per month.

The success of Subway Surfers has also resulted in the creation of Subway Surfers The Animated Series - an 11-episode short-form cartoon series that follows the adventures of the game's four main protagonists; Jake, Tricky, Fresh and Yutani. The show also includes some antagonistic characters such as Guard, Dog, and Frank - the mysterious figure who wears a bunny mask. The series premiered on June 1, 2018 and was well received. The episodes have accumulated over 100 million views and are currently published on SYBO TV (SYBO's YouTube channel with over 3.3 million subscribers) along with supporting content such as behind-the-scenes and character feature videos.

SYBO further extended its universe by launching the Snapchat game Subway Surfers Airtime as of late 2019. The multiplayer mobile game allows you to challenge your friends and race with your favorite characters. Skate the tracks and collect coins to unlock new characters. Hold and release to jump and get ahead of your friends to reach the finish line first.

SYBO's second endless runner game was Blades of Brim (BoB) released in 2015. Blades of Brim became the editor's choice in the Apple app store as of 2016. The player runs through levels to save the world of Brim by fighting the Goon Lord's minion army. The BoB endless runner is free-to-play and includes magic creatures.

== History ==
Knowing each other from the leading animation institution in Denmark, the Animation Workshop, Creative Director Sylvester Rishøj Jensen and CEO Bodie Jahn-Mulliner founded SYBO Games in 2010 as a consequence of winning 1st prize for best animation movie at Hamburg Animation Award 2009.

Their short film featured a graffiti troublemaker who had to run away from the dog and the guard as they chased him around in the subway. Pitching the game idea for Danish Film Institute, New Danish Screen sponsored SYBO Games initiative for the game resulting in a release three years later.

Before they launched Subway Surfers, they also created the game apps Powerflow and Cosmic Cab.

Today, the game studio is completely self-owned and continues to develop regular updates for Subway Surfers, while also creating other games for mobile devices.

== Subway Surfers Animated Series ==
On June 1, 2018, the first of a series of animated shorts debuted on SYBO Games YouTube channel. At the beginning of 2020, the series hit 170 million views. The 10 x 4-minute episodic series is scripted by Brent Friedman and Francesca Marie Smith and produced by Daytime Emmy award-winning producer Sander Schwartz. Chris Bartleman is supervising director and Michael Hegner is the director.

== Environment ==
On September 23, 2019, SYBO joined Playing for the Planet together with UN Environment. By joining, SYBO and 19 other game development companies made several commitments to deliver games in environmentally sustainable ways. Playing for the Planet aims to reduce emissions by 30 million tonnes CO_{2} by 2030, plant millions of trees, advance energy conservation, increase consumer awareness via in-game menus and game design, reduce plastics and toxics in packaging, steer towards a circular economy in plastic and electronic device (e-waste) management, and catalyze a global scale ally in planetary problem-solving.

Prior to joining Playing for the Planet SYBO changed to an organic and mostly vegetarian canteen and installed solar panels on their office building's roof. SYBO also invested in solar projects in India and waste management in Chile.

== Awards and honors ==
- SYBO Games winning Best Pitch at Growing Games 2011
- Subway Surfers declared AppAdvice's Game of the Week for May 31, 2012
- Subway Surfers nominated in the Community Choice-category by Unity Awards 2012 for games that takes the best advantage of the Unity 3D game engine
- Winner of Best Danish Game at Mobil Awards 2012 by Danish newspaper B.T. and Magasinet Mobil
- Among top 10 non-stop running game apps for iOS and Android by NDTV Gadgets
- Winner of Best Bathroom Break Casual Game 2013 by Best Mobile App Awards
- Subway Surfers nominated for Best Nordic Handheld Game 2013 by Nordic Game Awards

- Subway Surfers nominated by Producentforeningen for Game Of the Year in Denmark, Spilprisen, 2013
- 5th Annual Awards Winner for Best Entertainment App by BestAppEver for Android
