= Chronology (video game) =

2014 video game

- Steam header
- Developer: Bedtime Digital Games
- Producer: Galan Viorel Nicolae
- Designer: Niels Højgaard Sørensen
- Programmer: Thomas Egeskov Petersen
- Platforms: iOS; Microsoft Windows
- Release: Windows: WW: May 12, 2014; iOS: WW: September 12, 2014
- Genre: Puzzle-platform
- Mode: Single-player

Chronology (also known as Chronology: Time Changes Everything) is a 2014 puzzle-platform game by Danish developer Bedtime Digital Games.

The game released on May 12, 2014, for Microsoft Windows and September 12, 2014, for iOS.

== Gameplay ==
In the game, the player defies time by manipulating the past and the future, in order to fix the present. As the 'Old Inventor' and his sidekick 'The Snail', the player can take advantage of their special abilities - travel back and forth in time, stop time, manipulate objects and solve puzzles.

== Reception ==
Reception

Aggregate score
Aggregator	Score	
Aggregator	iOS	PC
Metacritic	77/100	64/100

Review scores
Publication	Score	
Publication	iOS	PC
Eurogamer	N/A	6/10 (Note: This review was done by a reviewer for Eurogamer.it.)
Gamezebo	80/100	N/A
Hardcore Gamer	N/A	2.5/5
IGN	N/A	6/10 (Note: This review was done by a reviewer for IGN Italia.)
TouchArcade	3.5/5	N/A
Vandal	N/A	5.5/10

Chronology received "mixed or average" reviews on the PC version whereas on the iOS version, it received "generally favorable" reviews, according to review aggregator Metacritic.

Emiliano Baglioni for Eurogamer.it rated the game 6/10, stating that "The final judgment is therefore quite controversial. Despite not being too elaborate, Chronology is a nice platformer that captivates and engages with its puzzles without causing the experience to end in excessive frustration."

Carter Dobson for Gamezebo rated the game 80/100, stating that "I had a good time with Chronology, and I'm going to bet you will too. It's brief, but makes great use of its ideas. Time travel is an underused gameplay mechanic, and I hope more games use it like Chronology does."

Matt Whittaker for Hardcore Gamer rated the game 2.5/5, stating that "Chronology is a fun, charming and challenging adventure with dialogue that is sure to make you smile. Its endearing cast of characters will likely keep you engaged for the duration of its short story."

Lorenzo Baldo for IGN Italia rated the game 6/10, stating that "Due to these limitations, Chronology stops at scholastic passing and cannot aspire to more flattering evaluations. The hope is that Osao Games can capitalize on this experience, to avoid making the same mistakes in the future."

Andrew Fretz for TouchArcade rated the game 3 and a half stars out of 5, stating that "I had fun so far in my trip through Chronology and I am looking forward to continuing my adventure. The game is a good grab for anyone looking to jump through time and solve a few puzzles."

Jorge Cano for Vandal rated the game 5.5/10, stating that "Chronology, with its couple of hours of duration, its lack of originality and how vulgar it is in its playable proposal, is going to have a very difficult time attracting anyone's attention, in a genre, that of adventures with platforms and puzzles, in which competition is increasingly fierce within the independent scene."
