= Felix the Reaper =

2019 video game

- Developer: Kong Orange
- Publisher: Daedalic Entertainment
- Engine: Unity
- Platforms: macOS; Nintendo Switch; PlayStation 4; Windows; Xbox One; iOS
- Release: macOS, Switch, PS4, Windows, Xbox One: WW: October 17, 2019; iOS: WW: July 15, 2020
- Genre: Puzzle
- Mode: Single-player

Felix the Reaper is a 2019 puzzle game developed by Kong Orange and published by Daedalic Entertainment. In each of the game's levels, players must navigate player character Felix through a series of spatial puzzles without coming into contact with the light of the sun, which requires players to manipulate the environment using various gameplay mechanics to provide pathways for Felix to reach the end of the level and fulfill his duties. Felix's goal in each scenario is to instigate deadly and often contrived accidents to claim a non-player character's life using elements within the level's environments.

The developers of Felix the Reaper were inspired by historical artistic depictions of death, specifically the Danse Macabre concept, which depict the dead dancing on their way to the grave. The game was under development for 8 years prior to its multiplatform release in October 2019 to mixed reviews. Some critics appreciated the novelty of the game's concept and its aesthetic presentation, while others found the game's puzzles to be overly frustrating or uninspired.

== Gameplay ==
Felix the Reaper is a 3D puzzle game divided into five chapters, with each chapter containing up to six levels. Players assume the role of Felix, a masked reaper within the Ministry of Death. Each level involves a scenario where Felix must instigate a set of circumstances that ultimately leads to the death of a non-player character in a gruesome, yet comical, manner as pre-ordained by the Ministry of Death. The levels are played out on floating landmasses which are segmented into tiled blocks arranged in grids, and littered with people, animals and various objects like trees, barrels and platforms. Aside from serving as obstacles, they cast shadows over the game world based on the direction of the sun in the sky, which is an important mechanic as Felix must remain in the shadows in order to reach the conclusion of each level. Players may manipulate the angle or placement of the generated shadows through elements like switches, then control the sun to shift shadows cast throughout the level, which then creates the necessary pathways for Felix to traverse the terrain. Felix can sometimes pick up objects, people, and animals which could cast shadow pathways for him. Players may also clear optional objectives, such as a completing a level under a set number of moves.

When idle, Felix bops around gleefully while listening to music on his headphones. Whenever he is issued a directive to move along a pathway, Felix will perform various dancing moves like cartwheeling, jumping, clicking his heels and doing the twist.

== Development and release ==
Developed by Kong Orange, a Danish independent studio with staff members who have worked as historians, Felix the Reaper is their first large-scale original title. Kong Orange was formed in 2012, and its team members began actively worked on Felix the Reaper since 2016. The game has undergone a number of internal iterations, including one that emulated the gameplay of the Hitman video game franchise. Felix's red tie and suit is a subtle reference to series protagonist Agent 47. Authenticity is important for the developers, who worked with professional dancers to properly create Felix's dance moves, and hired nine musicians to work on the soundtrack.

The design aesthetic of Felix the Reaper explores the concept of the personification of Death, specifically the Danse Macabre concept, an art style from the Late Middle Ages in Europe that portrays skeletal figures engaged in dancing. Representations of death are also depicted to be skulking in the shadows. These aspects influenced the design of the Felix character, such as his aversion towards sunlight and the shade-based gameplay mechanic at the core of the game. An important theme concerning Felix the Reaper is love, specifically a theme of love that cannot be reciprocated. Felix is constantly driven by an urge to dance because he has fallen deeply in love with another being, personified as the Maiden, who works at the Ministry of Life. Because of the nature of their respective work, thematically Felix and the Maiden are never supposed to meet, but he is convinced that she will fall in love with his dancing once they finally meet. The game's narrator, who provides instructions to Felix and comments on his actions throughout each level, is voiced by English actor Patrick Stewart.

Felix the Reaper began production as a Microsoft Windows PC title, though it was ported for same-day release for macOS as well as multiple video game console platforms: PlayStation 4, Xbox One, and the Nintendo Switch. After it was released on all PC and console platforms on October 17, 2019, a mobile version of Felix the Reaper was released on the Apple Store for iOS the following year on July 15, 2020.

== Reception ==
Reception

Aggregate score
Aggregator	Score
Metacritic	(PC) 71/100 (NS) 67/100 (XONE) 69/100 (iOS) 67/100

Review scores
Publication	Score
Edge	5/10
GameSpot	5/10
Hardcore Gamer	8/10
IGN	7.8/10
Pocket Gamer	6/10
TouchArcade	8/10

According to the review aggregator Metacritic, Felix the Reaper has received average or mixed reviews following its 2019 multi-platform release. The majority of critics praised the game's visual design, humor, character themes, and Patrick Stewart's performance as its narrator, but were divided with regards to its gameplay design. Adam Beck from Hardcore Gamer called Felix the Reaper one of the best puzzle games of 2019 and highlighted among other qualities it visual design, world building, music and Felix's appearance. Beck found the gameplay to be "highly challenging" but enjoyable and rewarding. The Italian edition IGN noted that while the style and gameplay of Felix the Reaper do not intersect with each other, the game is still considered to be a solid effort by its developers. Other sources were more critical of the game's perceived flaws. Edge considered the game "competent but insufficient and disparate", and that its ideas felt like it was stripped back from a broader original vision, as they did not feel properly fleshed out or meaningful linked. GameSpot insisted that "no amount of visual charm or dark humor in its violent deaths" makes committing to the game worthwhile, as the "thoroughly enticing setting and premise" is undermined by mediocre and misguided puzzle mechanics that fail to build on the game's foundations in any meaningful way.

The game's 2020 mobile port also met with a mixed reception. James Wyndcliffe from TouchArcade was more positive in its assessment, calling Felix the Reaper a labour of love that delivered adequately on all three of its central promises, namely its dark comedy, interesting shadow puzzles, and Felix's appealing dance moves. He acknowledged that the game has "rough patches" and its strengths are not "evenly distributed", but took the view that they are not insurmountable issues that detracts from the overall experience. On the other hand, Catherine Ng Dellosa from Pocket Gamer opined that the developers provided a "rich, quirky, and tragically romantic world" for players to explore, but failed to create a more absorbing and compelling video game experience in Felix the Reaper.
