= Miniatures (video game) =

2024 video game

- Developer: Other Tales Interactive
- Publisher: Other Tales Interactive
- Designers: Tanja Lind Tankred; Gianfranco Dbeis; Balázs Rónyai
- Composers: Gianfranco Dbeis; Mads Vadsholt
- Platforms: iOS; Linux; MacOS; Nintendo Switch; Windows
- Release: November 14, 2024
- Genre: Point-and-click adventure
- Mode: Single-player

Miniatures is a point-and-click adventure game developed and published by Other Tales Interactive. It was released in 2024 for iOS, Linux, MacOS, Nintendo Switch, and Windows.

== Gameplay ==
Miniatures is an adventure game that consists of clicking on objects to direct actions. During one section, the player progresses by dragging the screen along as though flipping through a book. Occasionally, the game is broken up by simple puzzles.

== Plot ==
The game consists of four separate vignettes.

- The Paludarium: A lonely boy bonds with his new pet.
- The House of the Moon: A girl searches for her mother after she disappears with the Moon.
- The Last Sand Castle: A village of crab-like beings begin their day before a wave sweeps them away.
- Familiar: A family of four assemble a cabinet together.

== Development ==
Miniatures was released by Other Tales Interactive, an independent game studio based in Copenhagen, Denmark. Their previous game, released in 2019, was Tick Tock: A Tale for Two.

A demo was released for Steam Next Fest preceding the full release on November 14, 2024.

== Reception ==
Ben Sledge of TheGamer scored the game a 4/5, concluding that, "It's beautiful, melancholy, and purposefully weird, and I really appreciate that." Nintendo Life's Jess Elizabeth Reed gave the game an 8/10, praising each vignette's storytelling in very few words. Zoey Handley of Destructoid on the other hand rated Miniatures a 5/10, feeling that the game lacked depth.

At the 2025 Independent Games Festival, Miniatures received honorable mentions in the categories "Excellence in Narrative" and "Excellence in Visual Arts".
