= Heroes & Generals =

2016 video game

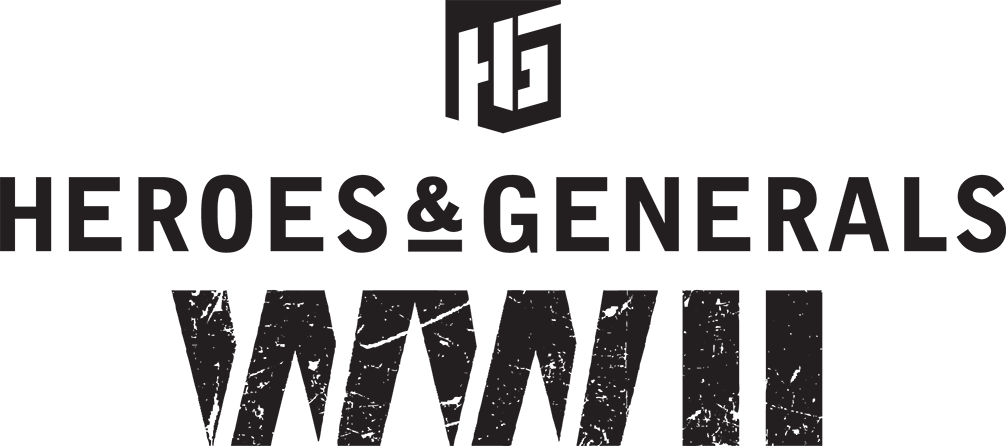
- Developer: Reto-Moto
- Publishers: TLM Games (2022–2023); Reto-Moto (2016–2022)
- Composer: Jesper Kyd
- Platform: Microsoft Windows
- Release: WW: September 23, 2016 - May 25, 2023; June, 2026 –
- Genres: First-person shooter, real-time strategy
- Mode: Multiplayer

Heroes & Generals is a free-to-play first-person shooter and real-time strategy video game set in World War II developed and initially published by Reto-Moto. The developers called it a "mass participation game" in contrast to a traditional massively multiplayer online game, where the actions in the FPS-part of the game reflect into the strategy-part. The player can use weapons from Germany, the United States, and the Soviet Union. Heroes & Generals was shut down on May 25, 2023 by TLM Games, following TLM Games' acquisition of Reto-Moto on February 3, 2022.

As of June 2026, the game is finally resurrected by the fanbase after 3 years of its shutdown. Since the “Sunrise”, the servers are back online.

== Gameplay ==
The player starts with an infantry soldier from each faction (United States, Soviet Union, Germany) and can buy additional soldiers with in-game credits. These soldiers are equipped with a default rifle and can immediately play the Encounter game mode. Upon reaching higher levels, players can participate in other game modes and recruit soldiers of different classes (pilot, tanker, recon, and paratrooper). Playing with a soldier increases that soldier's rank and unlocks new weapons and "badges," which can be equipped to provide bonuses in-game. When entering a battle, the player is presented with an interactive map showing the terrain and which team controls which control points. In the Skirmish and Encounter game modes, the player must click on the spawn point of their team (based on the nation) and can choose whether to spawn on foot or in a vehicle; teams win by successfully holding one control point (in Encounter) or three points (in Skirmish) until a bar at the top of players' screens for each team fills. In the Assault game mode, the same rules apply, except players can also spawn on control points captured by their team. Tank versus Tank rounds use the rules of Encounter games, but players are restricted to playing with tanks. Teams will always consist of soldiers from the same nation, unlike some World War II games that have teams of mixed nationalities (i.e. World of Tanks, War Thunder). The game includes period tanks, planes, and land vehicles. Tactical decisions made by players of officer rank in a real-time strategy part of the game, conducted through a Risk-like map of the European Theatre, affect reinforcements and logistics in FPS battles. Players will encounter a variety of terrain, from fields and countryside to large cities. The game features four game modes for the FPS aspect of the game: Assault, Skirmish, Encounter, Specialist versus Specialist.

=== Assault ===
In assault, one team will be defending from an offensive team or in rare cases, two offensive teams. The offensive team's goal is to seize two or three (depending on the map) main control points, while the defensive team has to defend those points. These main control points are linked by smaller strategic positions that must be taken before the next successive point being eligible for capture. The offensive team wins if it captures all main control points, while the defensive team can win by either holding out with all main control points until a timer runs out or capturing all the offensive team's control points. Players cannot play Assault until their player level is IV. This unlocks the Assault maps, after which all soldiers owned by that player can play Assault, regardless of rank.

=== Skirmish ===
Skirmishes are basic games that can be played by any character that has reached Rank I (i.e. completed one Encounter battle). Skirmishes consist of two teams that each have a spawn point. These teams must then fight for control over three control points (01, 02, and 03). When a team is holding a point, a bar for that team at the top of the screen gradually fills up. The more control points occupied, the faster the bar will fill. The game ends when one team successfully holds multiple control points long enough.

=== First Encounter ===
The Encounter game mode is a simplified version of a skirmish, designed for new players but available for play by all. The player is against bots. Like a skirmish, a team wins when it has held control points long enough to fill a bar at the top of the screen, but unlike a skirmish, there is only one control point (01). This allows new players to get a feel for the game and will let them proceed to Skirmishes following their first Encounter round.

=== Specialist versus Specialist ===
The Specialist versus Specialist game mode is based on the Encounter game mode, with one control point being fought over by two factions; however, the game mode is designed to facilitate specialist battles by allowing players to only participate with tanker-class soldiers, recons or pilots. Players can choose which specialist battle he wants to play by selecting specialist in the main menu. Teams have two spawn points each, and AI-controlled infantry are spawned in to fight alongside the players.

== Development ==
Heroes & Generals was developed using Reto-Moto's own browser-based 3D game engine, called "Retox." The development-model was referred to as "User Driven Development," and the idea behind it was to show how the game is being made, and in the making the developers hope to get feedback from the players. Heroes & Generals uses the BattlEye anti-cheat system.

== Marketing and release ==
On October 7, 2011, Reto-Moto released the first teaser trailer for the alpha-version of Heroes & Generals as an exclusive video on GameTrailers.

The game was released for Microsoft Windows via Steam as a pre-release beta on July 11, 2014.

The game was officially launched on September 23, 2016.

== Controversies ==
The game faced heavy criticisms following the October 2018 release of its 'Armour 2.0' update which resulted in gameplay mechanics being reimagined. This resulted in an exodus of players from the game during a time when Reto-Moto were facing financial difficulties.

== Acquisition by TLM Partners ==
On February 4, 2022, TLM Partners announced it had acquired Heroes & Generals and related businesses from Reto-Moto. Reto-Moto filed a bankruptcy notice on March 7, 2022.

On January 31, 2023, the company announced it would redevelop the game into a sequel called Heroes & Generals 2: The Next War using Unreal Engine after determining that the Retox engine had become antiquated, and would shut down the original game's servers in approximately 6 months. The Kickstarter campaign launched on February 13, 2023 but failed to get funded.

On April 3, 2023, TLM Games confirmed the game's shutdown would occur on May 25, 2023, and that the ability to purchase in-game currency and unique helmets for backers was permanently disabled. On the same day a 'Goldrush' event was revealed, promising unlimited resources, allowing players to try out every piece of equipment available, starting from May 2, 2023.

At midnight on May 25, 2023, the game was shut down permanently.

== Unofficial project ==
The promised sequel was never released. After a period of inactivity, several independent groups began redeveloping different iterations of the game. In December 2024, a restored 2013 version of Heroes & Generals was released and in February 2025, a 2014 version was released. After a release of a 2017 edition in May of 2025 the 2014 version was shut down again. The final 2023 version was released on June 12th, 2026. The project is largely coordinated via Discord, with additional updates shared on Reddit.

In 2026, an official revival effort led by Insight Interactive was reported, aiming to recreate the original gameplay experience.
