= Trailmakers =

Sandbox video game from 2019

- Developer: Flashbulb Games
- Publisher: Flashbulb Games
- Engine: Unity
- Platforms: Microsoft Windows, Xbox One, PlayStation 4
- Release: Microsoft Windows, Xbox One; 18 September 2019 (Note: Released for early access on Steam on 30 January 2018); PlayStation 4; 21 May 2020
- Genres: Sandbox, simulation
- Modes: Single-player, multiplayer

Trailmakers is a sandbox video game developed and published by Danish independent developer Flashbulb Games. The game is a 3D physics-based vehicle construction simulator with open world exploration elements. The game was made available for early access on Steam on 30 January 2018, and fully released on 18 September 2019 for PC and Xbox One. The game was released for PlayStation 4 on 21 May 2020.

== Gameplay ==
Trailmakers can be played in various game modes including adventure, sandbox, and racing. All game modes can be played in either single-player or multiplayer and the game offers modding support on PC. The camera is usually third-person, but can be changed to first-person by the player.

The game features 7 sandbox style maps that can be accessed for free: Stranded, Danger Zone, Test Zone, Treasure Island, Great Carrier Reef, and Pioneers. There are DLCs that give the player access to maps: High Seas Expansion (High Seas), Airborne Expansion (Airborne), and Frozen Tracks (Hoff). Other maps the player can play in are: Dethrone Island, which can only be accessed through Multiplayer, Time trials, Race Island, and Rally, which is Singleplayer exclusive.

== Release ==
The game was originally released as an early access title on the Steam store on 30 January 2018 and garnered over 100,000 sales. The game was fully released for PC and Xbox One on 18 September 2019, and for PlayStation 4 on 21 May 2020. By February 2025, Trailmakers reached over 5 million players across all platforms.
