= Rytmos =

2023 video game

- Developer: Floppy Club
- Director: Asger Strandby
- Artists: Art director Niels Fyrst, Visual effects and 3D modelling Casper Øbro
- Composer: Niels Böttcher
- Platforms: Windows; macOS; Nintendo Switch; iOS; Android
- Release: Windows, macOS, Switch; 28 February 2023; iOS; May 2023; Android; 6 July 2023
- Genre: Puzzle
- Mode: Single-player

Rytmos is a 2023 video game developed and published by Danish independent developers Floppy Club for desktop and mobile platforms. It is a puzzle video game in which players draw lines on surfaces of planets to assimilate tracks of music that form a song upon completion of the level. Upon release, Rytmos received a generally favorable reception, with reviewers praising the game's musical concept, soundtrack and puzzle design. Following release, the game received awards at the Nordic Game Awards and Apple Design Awards.

== Gameplay ==
Gameplay consists of completing a line in a loop across the surface of a planet.

The objective of Rytmos is to reassemble planets that have been destroyed by a meteor storm. In each level, players must draw a line across a surface of the planet to complete a loop. Drawing of the line follows certain rules: it travels in a linear direction of the cursor until it hits an obstacle, and can pass through itself, but must close the loop by ending at the starting point. When a player completes the loop, it generates sounds from the nodes the line passed through, forming a channel of a music track. By completing all six surfaces, the musical tracks on that planet are fully combined into a song and the player progresses to the next level. Completion of puzzles is graded by the number of nodes the player passes through when completing the loop; each playing part of a song; when players cross all nodes, they earn a Gold award for that level. Levels feature hazards and moving objects, such as ice cubes, warp portals, and rocks that influence the movement of the drawn line. The game displays notes containing information about the history and background of the genres of music playing in the sequence.

== Development and release ==
Rytmos was developed by Floppy Club, a four-person development team based in Copenhagen, Denmark. Founders Niels Böttcher and Asger Strandby met as long-time friends in Aarhus and bonded over a shared love of music, with Böttcher operating record label and Strandby being a member of local bands including Analogik. The pair founded the studio in 2019 out of a desire to express their musical interests in a rhythm game, based on the patterns created by music sequencers. After creating a series of failed prototypes, the developers made progress to create a gameplay loop that was more open-ended and allowed players to "express creativity in their solutions" to puzzles. They were inspired by a range of diverse world genres when composing the game's music, including German electronic music, Ethio-jazz and Indonesian gamelan.

Rytmos was published for Windows, macOS and the Nintendo Switch in February 2023, and ported to iOS in May 2023 and Android in June 2023.

== Reception ==
Reception

Aggregate score
Aggregator	Score
Metacritic	80/100

Review scores
Publication	Score
Game Informer	8.5/10
Nintendo World Report	8/10
The Guardian	4/5

According to review aggregator platform Metacritic, Rytmos received "generally favorable" reviews. Several critics described Rytmos as partly a game, an interactive toy, and an educational tool. Its puzzles were praised, with TouchArcade calling them "very clever and satisfying to figure out", and Eurogamer describing them as "playful" due to their open-ended rules that encouraged experimentation and problem-solving. Some critics described the gameplay as easy and relaxing, as not all nodes needed to be passed to complete the puzzle.

Critics praised the integration of the game's music into the puzzle gameplay, with many enjoying the inclusion of background on the musical genres. GameInformer stated that the music concept "uses puzzles to extract the joy, escalation, triumphs and trials of making music", stating the puzzles contributed to the feeling of building a musical score. The soundtrack was also highlighted, with The Guardian commending the game's "eclectic range of global sounds". The visual design of Rytmos also received praise. Eurogamer highlighted the game's "bold flat colours" and "chunky playing areas" for giving the game a sense of tactility, and The Guardian found the presentation "striking".

=== Accolades ===
Rytmos received the 'Game of the Year - Small Screen' award at the Nordic Game Awards in 2024. and the Interaction award at the 2024 Apple Design Awards. The judging panel of the Apple Design Awards praised the game, stating "The brightly conceived onboarding makes gameplay instantly clear, and the gestures are simple and fun, even when the game starts delivering more complexity."
