= Subway Surfers =

2012 video game

- Logo used since 2020
- Developers: Kiloo; SYBO Games
- Publishers: Kiloo Games (24 May 2012- 13 February 2020); SYBO Games (24 May 2012–present)
- Director: Christian Balazs
- Engine: Unity
- Platforms: iOS; iPadOS; macOS; HarmonyOS NEXT; Android; Web browser; Windows 10 Mobile; Windows Phone 8; Amazon Fire Tablet; Windows 7
- Release: 24 May 2012
- Genre: Endless runner
- Mode: Single-player

Subway Surfers is a 2012 endless runner mobile game which is co-developed by Kiloo and SYBO Games, private companies based in Denmark. It is available on iOS, Android, HarmonyOS NEXT, Amazon Fire Tablet, Windows Phone platforms, and is playable on web browser at Poki.com and uses the Unity game engine.

In the game, players take the role of young graffiti artists who, upon being caught in the act of tagging a metro railway site, run through the railroad tracks to escape from a police officer. As they run, the player must avoid colliding with train cars and other objects while collecting coins and power-ups.

Subway Surfers received mixed reviews. A sequel, Subway Surfers City, released on February 26, 2026, featuring new characters, mechanics and locations.

== Gameplay ==
A screenshot featuring the main character Jake running through the rails during gameplay in the "Mexico" theme update of Subway Surfers

Subway Surfers is an endless runner video game. The game starts by tapping the screen, while Jake (the game's main character) or any other character sprays graffiti on a subway, and gets caught in the act by the inspector (police officer) and his dog, who starts chasing the character. While running, the player can swipe up, down, left, or right to avoid crashing into oncoming obstacles especially moving trains, poles, tunnel walls, and barriers. By swiping rapidly as speed increases, more points can be acquired. A crash results in a game over, but the player can revive and continue by using keys or watching an ad.

The player can collect various items such as coins, keys, x2 multipliers, super sneakers, jetpacks, magnets, mystery boxes, and pogo sticks. A pogo stick provides propulsion by launching the character upward, a jetpack gives the ability to fly, a coin magnet attracts coins on the track, super sneakers give the ability to jump higher, and a x2 multiplier multiplies the rate at which the score counts. Items, such as a hoverboard (which could be used by double-tapping on the screen), allow the character to avoid collisions and lasts about 30 seconds.

Daily Challenges and Season Hunts give rewards for unique movements throughout gameplay. In daily challenges, the player needs to collect letters that constitute a word related to the game, such as "score" and "jump"; also known as "word hunt". Missions have various tasks measured by player accuracy. Up to 18 characters can be unlocked using coins, keys, in-game purchases, collecting specific items, or connecting to a Facebook account. Most characters have up to 2 different outfits. Meanwhile, up to 17 hoverboards can be unlocked with the same methods. Each has different abilities that can assist the player. When the game updates to a new location, a new character, and hoverboard will be available temporarily until the next update.

Special events, such as the Season Hunt, including the game's birthday events, the Super Runner Challenge and Rivals Challenge, can result in in-game rewards and characters. Additional outfits and characters can be purchased with coins and keys as well.

== Release ==
Subway Surfers was released on 24 May 2012 with updates based on seasonal holidays. Since January 2013, updates have been based on a "World Tour" theme, which updates the setting of the game every three (or four, usually for seasonal holidays) weeks.

In March 2018, Subway Surfers became the first game on the Google Play Store to cross the one billion downloads threshold. In May 2018, Subway Surfers crossed the two billion downloads mark. App Annie reported Subway Surfers as the #2 downloaded game of all time in iOS App Store.

In December 2019, SYBO Games announced that Subway Surfers, according to AppAnnie statistics, crossed the 2.7 billion download mark. Subway Surfers was the most downloaded mobile game of the decade from 2012 to 2019. A spin-off, Subway Surfers Tag, was released exclusively on Apple Arcade in 2022.

== Reception ==
Reception

Aggregate score
Aggregator	Score
Metacritic	71/100

Review scores
Publication	Score
Gamezebo	3.5/5
Pocket Gamer	5/10
TouchArcade	4/5
148Apps	4/5

Subway Surfers received mixed reviews. Critics praised the game's visual style and entertaining gameplay but criticized it for its monotonous world and unresponsive controls. Review aggregator website Metacritic gave the game 71 out of 100 based on 8 reviews.

Dan Griliopoulos of Pocket Gamer gave the game a score of 5 out of 10, praising the game's fun gameplay and free access, but criticizing the game's controls and parsimonious game design.

Gamezebo's Dant Rambo scored the game 3.5 out of 5, writing "It makes little attempt to stand out from other endless runners, but it's hard not to appreciate the polish of Subway Surfers. The controls are responsive, the gameplay is addictive, and it doesn't try and force you into spending cash on in-game items."

Other reviewers were not as critical. 148Apps and TouchArcade gave the game 4/5. The game was nominated for "Action Game" and "Family & Kids Game" at the 2019 Webby Awards.

== Legacy ==
=== Adaptation ===
On 1 June 2018, a series of animated shorts debuted on SYBO Games' YouTube channel entitled Subway Surfers: The Animated Series. The 10 x 4-minute episodic series is scripted by Brent Friedman and Francesca Marie Smith, and produced by Sander Schwartz. Chris Bartleman is the supervising director and Michael Hegner is the director. Denmark's William provides post-production services. The series has 11 episodes.

=== Use in sludge content ===
The game has been a favorite among "sludge content" creators, possibly due to its highway hypnosis-like visuals.
