= Echo (2017 video game) =

2017 video game

ECHO
- Developer: Ultra Ultra
- Publisher: Ultra Ultra
- Engine: Unreal Engine 4
- Platforms: Windows; PlayStation 4
- Release: Windows: WW: 19 September 2017; PlayStation 4: NA: 10 October 2017; EU: 11 October 2017
- Genres: Action, stealth
- Mode: Single-player

Echo (stylized as ECHO) is a 2017 stealth video game developed and published by Danish indie studio Ultra Ultra. It was released on 19 September 2017 for Windows and PlayStation 4 with a positive reception. However, the game was not a financial success, and it was the only game released by Ultra Ultra before it shut down.

== Setting ==
Echo takes place in a far-distant future; during the Push Era, technology quickly advanced, allowing humanity to colonize distant systems and planets in a period known as the Requisition Rush. Vast artificial intelligences and genetic enhancement are among the many sciences that approach magical levels of capability in this time.

En is a young woman from the "Resourcefuls Program": genetically modified humans created by her mystical grandfather "Gramps" to be capable of always succeeding, no matter the challenge. She travels with a bitter and pessimistic AI named London, who had previously partnered with a man named Foster; London initially despises En for her involvement with Foster's death, but comes to respect and even care for her.

=== Plot ===
En wakes from one hundred years in cryogenic stasis, alone aboard a spaceship piloted by London. Sometime before the journey, En had run away from Gramps, who hired Foster and London to recapture her. The incident left Foster dead; before he died, En acquired stellar coordinates given to him by Gramps, as well as a red cubic device, which she believes can be used to revive Foster. London goes along with the venture solely out of respect for his old partner.

Arriving at the coordinates, they find a mysterious world of repetitive, cubic megastructures extending from the planet's core; En dons Foster's space suit and descends to the surface, taking the cube with her, while London supports her remotely. Entering, she finds herself in the Palace: an endless, exquisite structure untouched by humans, each layer more extravagant and grand than the last. Interfacing with the cube powers up the structure, but it malfunctions; every so often, its systems reboot, causing a brief blackout. Soon after, the Palace instantly recomposes its atmosphere to be breathable, supporting plant life, and begins spawning black organic masses. After each blackout, these masses progressively evolve into hostile clones of En that grow in ability. She realizes the Palace is analyzing her; whenever she performs an action, the clones (which she calls Echoes) learn to use it against her. Each reboot updates them, learning En's actions during that cycle, unlearning unused ones, and resurrecting killed copies.

En proceeds through the structures via airlocks and elevators, descending hundreds of kilometers; she suspects the Palace was created as a retirement haven for the ultra-wealthy, where they could consider themselves gods with the Echoes for entertainment. When En becomes separated from the cube, she discovers the Echoes have been attacking her (and each other) to take it, mirroring her goal. She later reveals to London that Gramps knew of the Palace and desired its secrets, creating the Resourcefuls to one day access it. To preserve them indefinitely, he would then "translate" Resourcefuls who survived his program into CaYa super symmetrical manifolds, manifesting as red cubes. However, En rebelled: when Gramps tried to translate her by force, Foster, manipulated by En, broke the contract to save her, allowing her to kill Gramps. Now freed, she then translated the dying Foster to preserve him near death; regretting her choice to use him to her own ends, she wishes to atone by resurrecting him.

En reaches the Palace's innermost area, encountering larger, enhanced constructs that attack both En and the Echoes, their capabilities not limited by the reboot. Entering a spherical structure at the heart of the planet, she loses contact with London and finds herself in a recreation of her memories back aboard the ship. Locating a translated and unresponsive Foster, En discovers that the only way to bring him back is to sacrifice her own flesh. Accepting this, En tells him to take care of himself and of London before translating him back.

Sometime later, a reconstituted Foster awakens near the entrance of the once-again-dormant Palace where the cube first interfaced, hearing birds singing.

== Gameplay ==
The Echo experience sees the player traversing endless corridors and chambers, mostly traveling further down into an endless superstructure. The early game allows the player ample time to learn each of the tools as they become available, as well as solving puzzles, but before long enemies start presenting themselves.

The game's most key facet is consequences for one's actions: whenever a blackout occurs, anything En does during the previous lights-on period will become available to the Echoes prowling the Palace. For example, if sprinting while the lights are on, after the system reboots the enemies will become able to sprint. The same is true for opening doors, crossing water, vaulting, and using weapons or stealth. Conversely, they will not be able to use any unused actions during the previous lights-on period, and will thus unlearn previously learned abilities. Lethal options only give a temporary reprieve: enemies are revived by blackouts. As such, direct combat should be considered a last resort, instead making varied use of tools, stealth, and manipulation. Preceding each "reboot" is a brief lights-out period where the Palace does not register actions.

For most of the game, En wears a suit with a power cell system: shooting, taking a long fall, prolonged sprinting, and some other actions will consume one unit of power: the suit will automatically recharge its last unit only, but it can hold multiple charges that can be acquired from energy stands. Cell capacity can also be upgraded.

The suit has several tools that En can use to her advantage. The Sphere-HUD can detect nearby lifeforms, indicate their alertness, and can scan through walls. There is also a two-mode pistol: lethal instantly kills any targets in a straight line, whether hitting their head or grazing their hand, while riot-mode knocks all nearby enemies down. However, the gun is loud and slow to fire without power. En can also shove an enemy or initiate a lethal and quiet (but not silent) takedown if she can sneak up from behind.

== Film adaptation ==
In January 2019, dj2 Entertainment is attached to produce a film adaptation of the game with F. Gary Gray's company Fenix Studios producing and a screenplay by John Wick writer Derek Kolstad. However, in May 2019, upon the game studio’s shutting down, the adaptation is still in development.

== Reception ==
Reception

Aggregate scores
Aggregator	Score
Metacritic	PC: 72/100; PS4: 79/100
OpenCritic	62% recommended

Review scores
Publication	Score
Destructoid	8.5/10
GameSpot	8/10
Push Square	8/10

Echo received "generally favorable reviews" based on 24 critic reviews, according to review aggregator Metacritic. 62% out of critics recommended Echo on OpenCritic.

=== Accolades ===
Echo won four major awards at "Spilprisen 2018", the Danish Game Awards - Best Visual Design, Best Sound, Best Technical achievement, and Game of the Year.

The game was nominated for "Best Art Direction (Games)" at the 2018 Webby Awards, and the Excellence in Visual Art award at the 2018 Independent Games Festival.
