= BC Hospitality Group =

Danish hospitality group

- Type: Private
- Industry: Hospitality
- Founded: 2014
- Headquarters: Copenhagen, Denmark,
- Key people: Allan L. Agerholm (CEO); David R. Overby (chairman)
- Website: Official website

BC Hospitality Group is a hospitality group based in Copenhagen, Denmark. It is the owner and operator of the Bella Center convention centre as well as a number of hotels.

== History ==
Bella Center opened at Bellahøj in 1965 and was moved to its current location in Amager in 1975. Bella Center inaugurated the 3XN-designed Hotel Bella Sky at a site adjacent to the convention centre in June 2011.

Bella Center and Hotel Bella Sky were both acquired by Solstra Capital Partners in 2012. BC Hospitality Group was established in 2014.

== Activities ==
- Bella Center Copenhagen
- Crowne Plaza Copenhagen Towers
- AC Hotel Bella Sky Copenhagen,
- Copenhagen Marriott Hotel
- 360° Venue Catering
- CIFF
- CIFF Showrooms
- International House

== Redevelopment of the Bella Center ==
In early 2014, Solstra Capital and BC Hospitality Group presented an extensive plan for redevelopment of the Bella Center site into a new neighbourhood with offices, housing and other activities. The masterplan was designed by COBE Architects and Vilhelm Lauritzen Arkitekter. Solstra placed the Bella Quarter project in a separate company in 2016.
