= MovieStarPlanet =

2009 online social game

- Developer: MovieStarPlanet ApS
- Type: Online social game
- Launched: June 3, 2009; 17 years ago
- Platforms: Android, iOS, telux, Windows
- Operating systems: Adobe Flash (formerly); Unity/Nebula (currently)
- Pricing model: Freemium
- Website: moviestarplanet.com

MovieStarPlanet is a free-to-play online social game developed by MovieStarPlanet ApS for Windows, iOS, and Android. Initially released in Denmark in 2009, it has since grown to be available in sixteen countries, with more than 400 million registered profiles. Players can dress up their characters, chat and play mini-games.

== Gameplay ==
In MovieStarPlanet, the players take over the role of a movie star avatar, which can be customized in various ways by buying clothes or room decorations. The avatars can meet each other in the game world, and then chat publicly or privately. When a user logs in, they are introduced with a spinning wheel that can be spun daily, with the user being able to receive different amounts of the in-game currency called StarCoins. The main premise of the game is to gain experience points called Fame, which is then used so users can level up.

The game contains microtransactions, mainly in the form of its ''VIP'' membership, which gives players benefits such as receiving extra StarCoins and having the ability to add more friends. The membership can be purchased for a week, a month, three months, or one year. The game has spending limits, meaning the players can only spend some amount of money within a certain time frame. VIP memberships can also be received for free by winning the weekly competition.

== History ==
In 2007, Claus Lykke Jensen and his partner, who were at the time students from the University of Copenhagen, envisioned the initial idea for MovieStarPlanet. They signed up for an e-learning development pool project from the Ministry of Science. The goal was to develop a game that could improve children's English language skills. After two years of e-learning, the commitment condition for a grant was fulfilled, and the work on the game started. The same year, when his partner left the project before the business took off, Jensen became the sole founder of the development company. The game launched in May 2009, and was originally mainly focused on the animations players could create. It launched in Denmark and has since grown to be available in sixteen countries across Europe, North America, and Oceania. By 2013, the game had over 100 million registered accounts, eventually surpassing 400 million registered accounts. The game was designed with children aged 8–15 in mind.

At the 11th European Conference on Game-Based Learning, it was reported that MovieStarPlanet was, in 2014, the most popular game amongst 9–12-year-old girls in Norway.

== Merchandise ==
In 2012, it was announced that MovieStarPlanet would be cooperating with the publishing company Egmont to create a MovieStarPlanet Magazine. Each issue of the magazine comes with a code players can redeem in the game to then receive digital cosmetics, such as ''StarCoins'', the currency used in the game, or clothing items for the users' character. The magazines contents includes fashion tips for the users, comics, competitions readers can participate in and more. In August 2021, the 100th issue of the Polish version of the magazine was released.

In 2021, MovieStarPlanet partnered with Panini to create a trading card collection in Poland. The cards consisted of 220 different designs, split into six different categories.

== Reception ==
Leslie Crenna from Common Sense Media has rated the website as suitable for users who are 16 or older, and has stated that the "content and privacy issues raise way too many red flags for even savvy Internet users", while Online Safety UK has rated it as suitable for kids who are 9 or over, with "added caution from parents". Dana Anderson from Common Sense Media, reviewing the mobile version of the game, also rated it suitable for people aged 16 or older, stating "this app is too simplistic for teens' meaningful use, and the content is not appropriate for younger kids", along with stating that it "also reinforces messages about consumerism and appearance that parents may not want to reinforce."

The game won an award for innovation and creativity at EY Entrepreneur of the Year 2014.

== Controversy ==
MovieStarPlanet has stated that they are cautious of kids' online safety. Their head of safety, Vernon Jones, attended the Global Digital Citizenship Conference in 2013 at Melbourne. However, many articles have reported instances of grooming and underage users having received inappropriate/sexually explicit messages in the game.

== Sequel ==
A sequel of the game, MovieStarPlanet 2, was announced on October 25, 2019. A spin-off game called BlockStarPlanet also exists, alongside BooniePlanet, which is now defunct.
