= Reto-Moto =

Danish video game developer

Reto-Moto ApS
- Company type: Private
- Industry: Video games
- Founded: 1997; 28 years ago
- Defunct: 2022
- Fate: Bankruptcy
- Headquarters: Copenhagen, Denmark
- Key people: Jean-Marc Broyer (CEO)
- Products: Heroes & Generals
- Owner: Nordisk Film (minority stake)
- Number of employees: 25 (2012)

Reto-Moto ApS was a Danish video game developer based in Copenhagen. Founded in 1997, its staff formed IO Interactive as a joint venture in September 1998. Following a decade of inactivity, some founders reformed Reto-Moto in April 2008, and the company developed Heroes & Generals, which was released in September 2016.

== History ==
Prior to founding Reto-Moto, all founding members had been part of various demo groups. After a time in the US, they decided to move back to Copenhagen in 1997, where they founded Reto-Moto later that year. In September 1998, Reto-Moto, at the time consisting of Jesper Vorsholt Jørgensen, Rasmus Guldberg-Kjær, Martin Munk Pollas, Karsten Lemann Hvidberg, Jacob Andersen, Janos Flösser and David Guldbrandsen, and Danish film studio Nordisk Film launched IO Interactive, another developer, as a joint venture. Nordisk Film held a 40.3% stake in the venture. Due to IO Interactive's rapid success through Hitman: Codename 47 in 2000, Reto-Moto's operations were put on ice. Eventually, all stakes in IO Interactive were sold to Eidos Interactive in March 2004.

On 11 April 2008, four of IO Interactive's founders—Vorsholt Jørgensen, Pollas, Andersen, and Guldbrandsen—announced that they had, together with former Eidos Interactive executive producer Neil Donnell, reformed Reto-Moto as an active developer. Guldbrandsen and Donnell became the chief technology officer and chief executive officer, respectively. Six further IO Interactive employees left the company to join Reto-Moto in December that year. By April 2012, Reto-Moto had 25 employees, most of them transplants from IO Interactive.

Reto-Moto's first game, Heroes & Generals, was announced on 7 October 2011. A temporary publishing agreement for the game was reached with Square Enix in November 2012. Heroes & Generals was officially released on 23 September 2016 and has since reached 10 million registered users as of January 2017. On 16 August 2017, Reto-Moto hired Jean-Marc Broyer as new chief executive officer. Nordisk Film announced on 6 December 2017 that they had acquired a minority stake in Reto-Moto in exchange for a US$5 million investment.

On 4 February 2022, TLM Partners announced that it had acquired Heroes & Generals and related businesses from Reto-Moto. A bankruptcy notice for the company was published on 7 March 2022.

== Games developed ==
Year	Title	Platform(s)	Publisher(s)
2016	Heroes & Generals	Microsoft Windows	Reto-Moto
