= Lego Builder's Journey =

2019 video game

- Developer: Light Brick Studio
- Publisher: Lego Games
- Composer: Henrik Lindstrand
- Engine: Unity
- Platforms: iOS; macOS; tvOS; Microsoft Windows; Nintendo Switch; PlayStation 4; PlayStation 5; visionOS; Xbox One; Xbox Series X/S
- Release: iOS, macOS, tvOS; December 19, 2019; Windows, Switch; June 22, 2021; Xbox One, Xbox Series X/S; November 25, 2021; PlayStation 4, PlayStation 5; April 19, 2022; visionOS; February 2, 2024
- Genre: Puzzle
- Mode: Single-player

Lego Builder's Journey is a puzzle game developed by Light Brick Studio and published by Lego Games. It was originally released in December 19, 2019 on iOS, macOS, tvOS through Apple Arcade and Nintendo Switch and Microsoft Windows on June 22, 2021. It was also ported to Xbox One and Xbox Series X/S on November 25, 2021. The PlayStation 4 and PlayStation 5 ports of the game released on April 19, 2022. Lego Builder's Journey and Lego Brawls were the first two Lego games for Apple Arcade. Lego Builder's Journey has received generally positive reviews.

== Gameplay ==
Lego Builder's Journey is a puzzle game. The game allows the players to build their own model and solve puzzles. The game levels are freebuilding. The PlayStation 4 and PlayStation 5 versions included a Creative Mode that players to create and share their own imaginative builds.

== Development and release ==
Lego Builder's Journey was the first game developed by Light Brick Studio, the Lego Group's internal video game development studio, which was newly established specifically for the game's development. Lego Builder’s Journey was developed as part of The Lego Group’s restructuring of its mobile division, focused on creating simple, unlicensed mobile experiences that could function as standalone titles rather than acting as advertisements for specific set themes. The game was originally pitched to the company under the working title Path of Creation by creative director Karsten Lund and was one of three concepts presented at the time.

Despite being greenlit, Lund didn’t have any ideas for the gameplay or story, other than the general concept of a puzzle-oriented game that emphasized Lego play, didn’t use minifigures, and had no dialogue. The game was intended as a narrative about the value of creativity and play, aimed at a more mature audience and inspired by the Lego community of adult fans. Starting in August, the team spent 2018 experimenting with various prototypes with little success. Despite eventually settling on a gameplay idea, described as Tomb Raider-esque, the team completely restarted development in early 2019 when the studio started to feel like the game was too grand in scope and didn't represent Lego enough. Additionally, playtesters had suggested the game was confusing and hard to understand. The final story for the game was finalized in March. Lego Builder’s Journey had a set release date in December 2019, which gave the developers limited time to finish the game and led them to scale back the scope, making it simpler and shorter than originally planned. As a result of this, the story ended up fairly vague, which the developers later said worked better, since it let players interpret their own meaning. The game was originally titled Lego Arthouse; however, the team later changed it, feeling that the Builder’s Journey subtitle better fit the concept and story.

A creative mode update was released on April 14, 2022, allowing players to create mini dioramas with provided pieces.

Mixed reality features for visionOS became available through Apple Arcade with the release of the Apple Vision Pro headset on February 2, 2024.

A free expansion was released on June 12, 2025, titled Robot's Adventure.

== Reception ==
Reception

Aggregate score
Aggregator	Score
Metacritic	iOS: 80/100; PC: 79/100; XSX: 80/100; XONE: 75/100; NS: 76/100; PS5: 77/100

Review scores
Publication	Score
Game Informer	7.5/10
Gamezebo	3.5/5
Nintendo Life	7/10
Nintendo World Report	8.5/10
PC Gamer (US)	79/100
Push Square	7/10
Shacknews	8/10
TouchArcade	5/5

Lego Builder's Journey received "generally favorable" reviews upon release according to review aggregator website Metacritic, the IOS version had 80/100, the PC version had 79/100, the Nintendo Switch version had 76/100 and the PlayStation 5 version had 77/100.

Kate Gray for Nintendo Life gave the game a 7/10 and commented, "Getting back in touch with the pre-manual-following version of yourself is a delight, and having the story be about a parent and a child connecting through child's play is as touching as it is smart. Despite occasional misfires and what can feel like padding, this is a LEGO game which plays with the fundamental philosophy of creativity far more than the average LEGO-branded title, and we hope this is an indication of new games to come."

Alistair Jones for PC Gamer gave the game a 79/100 and commented, "A lifelike and heartfelt celebration of a beloved toy that overreaches in later levels."

Chad Sapieha for Common Sense Media gave the game a four out of five star rating and commented, "Lego Builder's Journey is a short but beautiful little puzzler that captures the spirit of the iconic toy on which it's founded almost perfectly."

Screen Rant gave the game a 4/5 and stated, "Lego Builder's Journey is an absolute delight overall. With wonderful design choices and a truly calming atmosphere, it's a moment of relaxation that puzzle fans will enjoy. Its simplicity may be a doubled-edge sword at times, but this is exactly the right kind of game for players who want to turn on and switch off."

=== Accolades ===
Year	Award	Category	Result	Ref.
2020	Golden Joystick Awards	Mobile Game of the Year	Won	
2020	Spilprisen	Best Visuals	Won	
2020	Spilprisen	Best Audio	Won	

== See also ==
- Lego Bricktales
