= 140 (video game) =

2013 platform game

- Developers: Carlsen Games; Abstraction Games (Wii U, PS4, Xbox One)
- Publishers: Carlsen Games; Double Fine Productions (Wii U, PS4, Xbox One)
- Director: Jeppe Carlsen
- Composer: Jakob Schmid
- Engine: Unity
- Platforms: Windows, OS X, Linux, PlayStation 4, Xbox One, Wii U, Nintendo Switch
- Release: Windows, Mac, Linux; October 16, 2013; Xbox One; August 30, 2016; PS4, Wii U; September 1, 2016; Switch; January 9, 2020
- Genre: Platform
- Mode: Single-player

140 is a platform game developed and published by Carlsen Games. It was directed by Jeppe Carlsen, who previously worked on Playdead's Limbo. The game is described as a "minimalistic platformer", using electronic music to create synesthesia as the player makes their way through four different levels, each with their own soundtrack. The gameplay has been compared to other similar games which involve music synchronization, such as Sound Shapes and the Bit.Trip series, with difficult platforming elements comparable to games in the Mega Man series. The game was released for Microsoft Windows, Mac, and Linux in October 2013, on Xbox One in August 2016, on PlayStation 4 and Wii U in September 2016, and Nintendo Switch in January 2020. A release on PlayStation Vita and Nintendo 3DS was planned, but later cancelled.

== Gameplay ==
As described by Carlsen, 140 is "an old school platformer", with the game's challenge being "syncing up your moves and jumps to the music-controlled elements"; as the player progresses through a level, the music will change to reflect the difficulty of the platforming elements. The player controls a geometric shape—a square when stationary, a circle when moving, and a triangle when jumping—across a two-dimensional environment made up of other simple geometric shapes, with the objective being to reach the end of the course. Along the way the player will need to collect floating colored balls that, when placed in a semicircular fixture on the ground, activate a new type of platforming obstacle that allows the player to continue. These activations have the effect of changing the color palette of the level and adding a new element to the music to which the new obstacle is synchronized.

Various obstacles and enemies, represented by geometric shapes, test the player's skills, and should the shape collide with one of the shapes filled with white noise, they will need to restart at the last checkpoint they passed. All of these obstacles and enemies have actions that are synchronized to the music, aiding the player in moving through the course; platforms that move or appear and disappear will do so on the beat, while enemies will fire in time to the music.

== Development ==
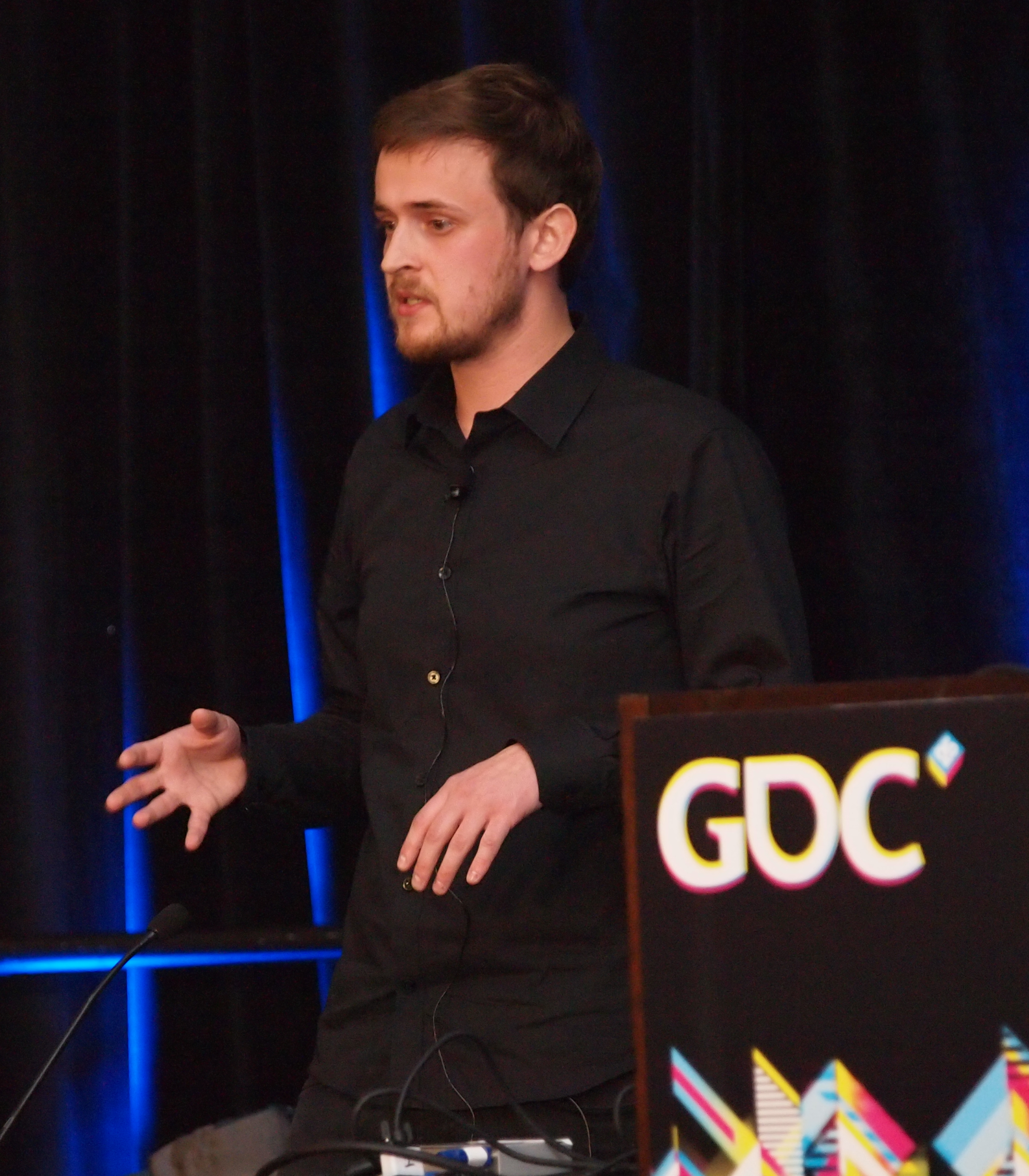
Jeppe Carlsen at the 2011 Game Developers Conference

140 was a project developed by Carlsen in his off-hours from Playdead. The idea originally grew from his attempt at an old school platformer, akin to Mega Man, that involved throwing a ball that would travel in straight lines and bounce off walls to trigger effects. Carlsen used the project to learn about the Unity game engine. As he started to add audio samples to the game, he found an interesting juxtaposition between the normal platform elements and the music, where the level would "dance to the music", and refocused the game towards its final form. Carlsen had worked on the title for about two years, and enlisted the help of Jakob Schmid, a college friend and fellow employee at Playdead, who created all music and sound for the game, and Niels Fyrst and Andreas Peiterson for art.

Carlsen announced in April 2016 that Abstraction Games and Double Fine Productions were helping to port the game to the PlayStation 4, PlayStation Vita, Xbox One, Wii U, and Nintendo 3DS with a release planned in Q4 2016. The Xbox One version was released on August 30, 2016.

== Reception ==
Reception

Aggregate scores
Aggregator	Score
Metacritic	PC: 80/100; Nintendo Switch: 70/100; PlayStation 4: 72/100
OpenCritic	39% recommend

Review scores
Publication	Score
Edge	8/10
Eurogamer	8/10
GameSpot	7/10
IGN	8/10
Nintendo Life	6/10
Nintendo World Report	6/10

Review aggregator OpenCritic assessed that 140 received fair approval, being recommended by 39% of critics. Edge considered the game to initially appear in stark contrast to Carlsen's earlier Limbo, but as the player progresses in the game, the various mechanics of 140 show similar traits to many of the puzzles and situations that Carlsen had developed for Limbo. Ryan Cartmel of Hardcore Gamer gave the game a 4/5, calling it "gaming minimalism done right." Derrick Sanskrit of The A.V. Club's Gameological Society called 140 "a tightly paced and clever game of precise timing and jumping" and praised its minimalist structure that allows the player to focus on the rhythm and gameplay.

The game won the "Excellence in Audio" category for the 2013 Independent Games Festival awards, and was an honorary mention in the "Technical Excellence" category.
