= Seumas McNally Grand Prize =

Main award given at the Independent Games Festival

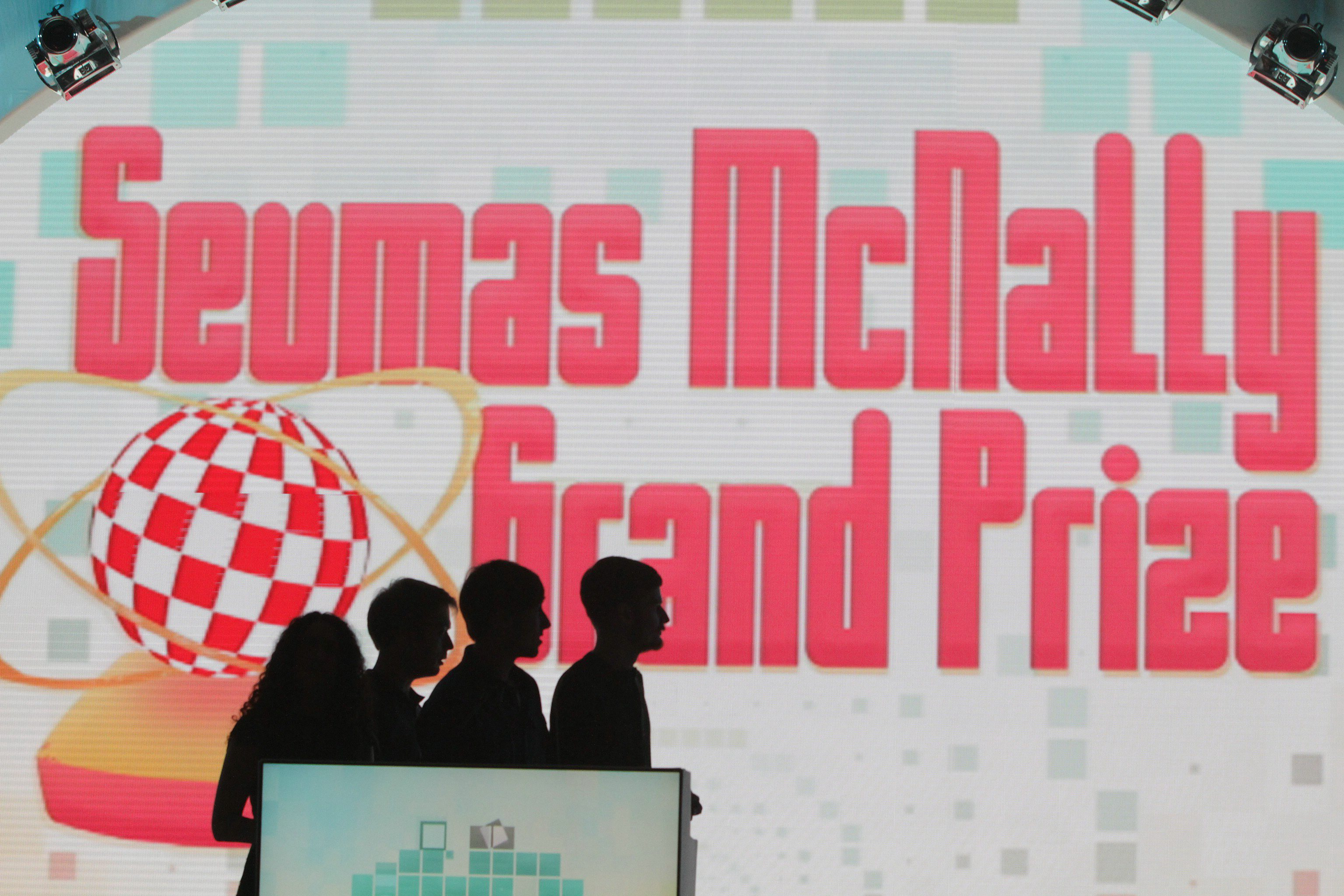
Seumas McNally Grand Prize 2016 Ceremony

The Seumas McNally Grand Prize is the main award given at the Independent Games Festival (IGF), an annual event that takes place during the Game Developers Conference, one of the largest gatherings of the indie video game industry. It was first awarded as the Independent Games Festival Grand Prize to Fire and Darkness in the 1999 edition of the festival. The next year, it was awarded to Seumas McNally for his game Tread Marks; following McNally's passing from Hodgkin's lymphoma shortly after, the award was renamed in his honor in 2001.

Twenty-seven video games have received the award, and more than 50 have been selected as finalists. The award is given alongside a prize of US$10,000. For the 2004 and 2005 years, it was divided into two categories, "Open Category" and "Web/Downloadable", although they were merged back into a single prize in 2006. From 2011 onward, a list of "Honorable Mentions" was introduced, composed of games that had been considered for the prize but had not become finalists.

Gish and Seed are the only games to become finalists in multiple editions of the event. Additionally, Gish is the only finalist to win the prize in a subsequent edition of the festival. FTL: Faster Than Light was the first game to have been both an honorable mention and a finalist, achieving the former in 2012 and the latter in 2013. The Stanley Parable achieved the same feat, becoming an honorable mention in 2013 and a finalist in 2014. Games do not have to be published in order to qualify for the prize; when Fez won the award in 2012, it was still undergoing pre-release certification. Some developers have won the prize twice, either solo or as part of a larger team: Alec Holowka for Aquaria and Night in the Woods, Lucas Pope for Papers, Please and Return of the Obra Dinn, and AP Thomson for Consume Me and Titanium Court (Thomson also holds the distinction of winning in two years in a row).

== Recipients ==
Year	Winner	Developer	Finalists (Note: From 1999 and until 2005, a list of award-specific finalists was not given. Instead, overall finalists were revealed alongside specific award winners.)	Honorable mentions (Note: Honorable mentions were introduced in 2011.)	Prize Money	Ref.
1999	Fire and Darkness	Singularity Software	Acidia; Bulbous II; BFRIS Zero-Gravity Fighter Combat; Crime Cities; EverNight; Flagship: Champion; Food Chain; Journey Into The Brain; Mind Rover; Resurrection; Seed; Sleights; Terminus; V.D.	—N/a		
2000	Tread Marks	Longbow Games	Blix; Hardwood Hearts; King of Dragon Pass; Moonshine Runners; Quaternion; The Rift (Far Gate); Rogue Wars; Seed	—N/a		
2001	Shattered Galaxy	Nexon	Archmage: Stabat Mater; Chase Ace 2; Hardwood Spades; Hostile Space; IronSquad; SabreWing; Strifeshadow; Takeda; Virtual U	—N/a		
2002	Bad Milk	Dreaming Media	Ace of Angels; Banja Taiyo; Championship Euchre; The Egg Files; Insaniquarium; Kung-Fu Chess; Pencil Whipped; Static; World Dance	—N/a	$10,000	
2003	Wild Earth	Super X Studios	BaseGolf; Furcadia; Mr. Bigshot; Pontifex II; Reiner Knizia's Samurai; Strange Adventures In Infinite Space; Teenage Lawnmower; Terraformers; Word Ninja	—N/a	$15,000	
2004 (Note: The Seumas McNally Grand Prize was split into two categories in 2004 and 2005: "Open Category" and "Web/Downloadable". A single award was given again from 2006 onwards.)	Savage: The Battle for Newerth	S2 Games	acmi {{park}}; Anito: Defend a Land Enraged; Bontago; Facade; Fashion Cents; Fuzzee Teevee; Spartan; Starshatter; Take Command: 1861 The Civil War	—N/a	$15,000	
2004	Oasis	Mind Control Software	AlphaQUEUE; Beesly's Buzzwords; Billiard Boxing; Chomp! Chomp! Safari; Dr. Blob's Organism; Dungeon Scroll; Gish; Space Station Manager; Yohoho! Puzzle Pirates	—N/a	$15,000	
2005	Gish	Chronic Logic	Alien Hominid; Dark Horizons Lore; Hyperbol; Kisses; Legion Arena; Protöthea; Steer Madness; Supremacy: Four Paths To Power; War! Age of Imperialism	—N/a	$20,000	
2005	Wik and the Fable of Souls	Reflexive Entertainment	Creatrix; Detective Brand Golf; Global Defense Network; Lux; N; Revolved; RocketBowl; Star Chamber; Weird Worlds: Return to Infinite Space	—N/a	$20,000	
2006	Darwinia	Introversion Software	Dofus; Professor Fizzwizzle; Wildlife Tycoon: Venture Africa	—N/a	$20,000	
2007	Aquaria	Bit Blot	Armadillo Run; Bang! Howdy; Everyday Shooter; Roboblitz	—N/a	$20,000	
2008	Crayon Physics Deluxe	Kloonigames	Audiosurf; Hammerfall; Noitu Love 2: Devolution; World of Goo	—N/a	$20,000	
2009	Blueberry Garden	Erik Svedang	CarneyVale: Showtime; Dyson; Night Game; Osmos	—N/a	$20,000	
2010	Monaco	Pocketwatch Games	Joe Danger; Rocketbirds: Hardboiled Chicken; Super Meat Boy; Trauma	—N/a	$20,000	
2011	Minecraft	Mojang	Amnesia: The Dark Descent; Desktop Dungeons; Nidhogg; SpyParty	Neptune's Pride; Super Crate Box; Recettear: An Item Shop's Tale; Bit.Trip Runner; Retro City Rampage	$20,000	
2012	Fez	Polytron	Dear Esther; Frozen Synapse; Johann Sebastian Joust; Spelunky	Antichamber; FTL: Faster Than Light; Proteus; SpaceChem; Where is my Heart?	$30,000	
2013	Cart Life	Richard Hofmeier	FTL: Faster Than Light; Hotline Miami; Kentucky Route Zero; Little Inferno	Gone Home; Starseed Pilgrim; Super Hexagon; The Stanley Parable; Thirty Flights of Loving	$30,000	
2014	Papers, Please	Lucas Pope	Device 6; Dominique Pamplemousse in "It's All Over Once the Fat Lady Sings!"; Don't Starve; Jazzpunk; The Stanley Parable	868-HACK; Crypt of the NecroDancer; Kerbal Space Program; The Yawhg; TowerFall Ascension	$30,000	
2015	Outer Wilds	Team Outer Wilds	80 Days; Invisible, Inc.; Metamorphabet; The Talos Principle; This War of Mine	Donut County; Endless Legend; Killer Queen; Shovel Knight; The Sailor's Dream; The Vanishing of Ethan Carter	$30,000	
2016	Her Story	Sam Barlow	Darkest Dungeon; Keep Talking and Nobody Explodes; Mini Metro; Superhot; Undertale	Affordable Space Adventures; Cibele; Oxenfree; Panoramical; Soft Body; That Dragon, Cancer; The Beginner's Guide; Twelve Minutes	$30,000	
2017	Quadrilateral Cowboy	Blendo Games	Inside; Stardew Valley; Event[0]; Hyper Light Drifter; Overcooked	1979 Revolution: Black Friday; Orwell; Imbroglio; Virginia; Duskers; Oiκοςpiel, Book I	$30,000	
2018	Night in the Woods	Infinite Fall	Getting Over It with Bennett Foddy; West of Loathing; Into the Breach; Heat Signature; Baba Is You	Tacoma; Rain World; Dream Daddy: A Dad Dating Simulator; Cosmic Top Secret; Hollow Knight; Cuphead; Everything is Going to Be OK	$30,000	
2019	Return of the Obra Dinn	Lucas Pope	Minit; Opus Magnum; Noita; Hypnospace Outlaw; Do Not Feed the Monkeys	Beat Saber; Iconoclasts; Mirror Drop; Moss; Subnautica; Wandersong; Virtual Virtual Reality; Unavowed	$30,000	
2020	A Short Hike	Adam Robinson-Yu	Eliza; Untitled Goose Game; Mutazione; Slay the Spire; Anodyne 2: Return to Dust	Katana Zero; Lonely Mountains: Downhill; Song of Bloom; Wide Ocean, Big Jacket; Astrologaster; Heaven's Vault	$10,000	
2021	Umurangi Generation	Origame Digital	Chicory: A Colorful Tale; Genesis Noir; Paradise Killer; Spiritfarer; Teardown	A Monster's Expedition (Through Puzzling Exhibitions); Blaseball; Bugsnax; Carto; Disc Room; Nuts; Omori; Spelunky 2; There Is No Game: Wrong Dimension	$10,000	
2022	Inscryption	Daniel Mullins Games	Cruelty Squad; The Eternal Cylinder; Loop Hero; Unpacking; Unsighted	Dodgeball Academia; Fuzz Dungeon; Norco; Overboard; Saturnalia; Toem; Webbed	$10,000	
2023	Betrayal at Club Low	Cosmo D Studios	The Case of the Golden Idol; Immortality; Neon White; Not For Broadcast; Tunic	Citizen Sleeper; Hardspace: Shipbreaker; Roadwarden; RPG Time: The Legend of Wright; Terra Nil; Tinykin	$10,000	
2024	Venba	Visai Games	1000xRESIST; A Highland Song; Anthology of the Killer; Cocoon; Mediterranea Inferno	Chants of Sennaar; Final Profit: A Shop RPG; Goodbye Volcano High; In Stars and Time; Rhythm Doctor; Tchia; The Cosmic Wheel Sisterhood	$10,000	
2025	Consume Me	Jenny Jiao Hsia, AP Thomson, Jie En Lee, Violet W-P, Ken "coda" Snyder	Caves of Qud; Despelote; Indika; Thank Goodness You're Here!; UFO 50	Animal Well; Balatro; Blue Prince; Mouthwashing; Nine Sols; Tactical Breach Wizards	$10,000	
2026	Titanium Court	AP Thomson	Angeline Era; Baby Steps; Blippo+; Horses; Perfect Tides: Station to Station	Ball x Pit; Demonschool; The Drifter; Eclipsium; Skate Story; Skin Deep; Time Flies	$10,000	
