= Starseed Pilgrim =

2013 video game

- Digital storefront banner
- Developer: droqen
- Engine: Adobe Flash
- Platforms: Windows, OS X
- Release: April 16, 2013 (Note: Starseed Pilgrim was released on Steam on April 16, but had been released at an unspecified date on other platforms prior to its Steam listing.)
- Genre: Puzzle-platform
- Mode: Single-player

Starseed Pilgrim is a 2013 puzzle-platform game from independent developer droqen. Players plant 'starseeds' which grow into plants, each with different growth patterns and interaction mechanics. Players plant these starseeds on floating platforms and on fully-grown plants in order to traverse the game world. The game was developed in Adobe Flash and was released in April 2013 for Windows and OS X. Reviewers praised Starseed Pilgrim's game mechanics and the process of learning their interactions, but criticized the learning curve as steep. The game was a finalist for the Excellence in Design award at the 2013 Independent Games Festival.

== Gameplay ==
Starseed Pilgrim is a two-dimensional puzzle-platform game. The player begins the game in a hub world consisting of floating platforms. From the hub world, they can enter a different platforming world, which consists of a floating platform made out of blocks. The player is then given a few 'starseeds' at random, and can plant them in blocks to grow plants. Each plant has a different growth pattern and interaction mechanic based on the starseed's colour: for example, pink starseeds create a slowly growing vertical plant, and their blocks can be dug up to obtain more starseeds. The player grows plants on top of each other in order to reach keys floating above, while staying ahead of a corruption originating from the starting platform that steadily corrupts blocks.

If the player touches a corrupted block, they are transported into an inverted version of the current world: plants and blocks turn into open space, and the previously-empty space turns into solid blocks. The player navigates this inverted world to return to where the starting platform was; there, the player can use a key they collected to return to the hub world. This also allows the player to bring with them any unused seeds from the platforming world, as well as any starseeds collected in the inverted world. The collected starseeds can then be planted on the hub world's platforms in order to gain access to other floating platforms.

== Development ==
Starseed Pilgrim was developed in Adobe Flash by Alexander Martin, also known as droqen, an independent game developer from Toronto. droqen released an initial prototype of the game on October 11, 2010, and completed most of the game 18 months before release. Ryan Roth contributed the sound effects and music, and Mert Batirbaygil created the art and visual assets; droqen also credits Allan Offal with providing important feedback during development.

The game was released on the distribution platform Steam on April 16, 2013, for Windows and OS X. (Note: News articles about the game's release on Steam mention its platforms either as Windows and OS X, or Windows, OS X, and Linux. However, the Steam listing for the game lists only Windows and OS X as platforms.) This release was done through an agreement between the Independent Games Festival (IGF) and Valve Corporation, the developer of Steam, that offered all 2013 IGF finalists a Steam distribution agreement.

== Reception ==
Reception

Aggregate score
Aggregator	Score
Metacritic	83/100 (Note: Score based on 12 reviews.)

Review scores
Publication	Score
Edge	8/10
Eurogamer	9/10
GameSpot	8/10
PC Gamer (US)	68/100
PC PowerPlay	7/10

Starseed Pilgrim received "generally favorable" reviews according to the review aggregator Metacritic. Reviewers praised the core gameplay loop and interactions between game mechanics, particularly the process of learning them, but criticized the learning curve as steep. Rich Stanton of Eurogamer praised the game's mechanics as "an absolute delight" once understood, particularly the inverted world which "delivers on a concept both narratively and mechanically", though characterized the learning curve as a "wall". Stanton also praised the sound effects as pleasing, while also functioning as a gameplay indicator of the corruption's spread. GameSpot staff described the visual and sound design as utilitarian but aesthetically consistent and effectively communicating information, but singled out some sound effects as "harsh and discordant". The staff cautioned that learning the mechanics "can be exceptionally challenging", but that it ultimately rewarded players with "an intense feeling of satisfaction" from exploring and learning how the game works. Writing for The Telegraph, Phill Cameron also praised the core gameplay loop, characterizing it as a process of "incremental understanding" that is continually subverted by new mechanics interactions to consistently surprise the player. Cameron opined that the lack of in-game explanations made the learning process more interesting, and that the randomized growth patterns of the starseeds rewarded player "improvisation and adaptation". Anthony Fordham was more critical of the lack of explicit instructions: in their review for PC PowerPlay, Fordham described Starseed Pilgrim as "a very interesting exercise in game design" and its mechanics as "original", but criticized the process of learning the game's systems as unclear and obfuscated.

Starseed Pilgrim was nominated for the Excellence in Design award at the 2013 Independent Games Festival, with honourable mentions for the Seumas McNally Grand Prize and the Nuovo Award. The game was also showcased as a finalist at the 2013 IndieCade exhibition.

The game sold around 1,000 copies before being listed on Steam.
