= Independent Games Festival =

Annual video games festival

- Awarded for: Outstanding independent video game developers and games
- Presented by: Game Developers Conference
- First award: 1999; 27 years ago
- Website: Official website

The Independent Games Festival (IGF) is an annual festival at the Game Developers Conference (GDC), the largest annual gathering of independent developers in the industry. Originally founded in 1998 to promote independent video game developers, and innovation in video game development by CMP Media, later known as UBM Technology Group, IGF is now owned by Informa after UBM's acquisition.

The IGF competition awards a total of approximately $28,000 in prizes to independent developers in Main Competition and Student Competition categories and is held around the same time as the Game Developers Choice Awards event.

== Competition Structure ==
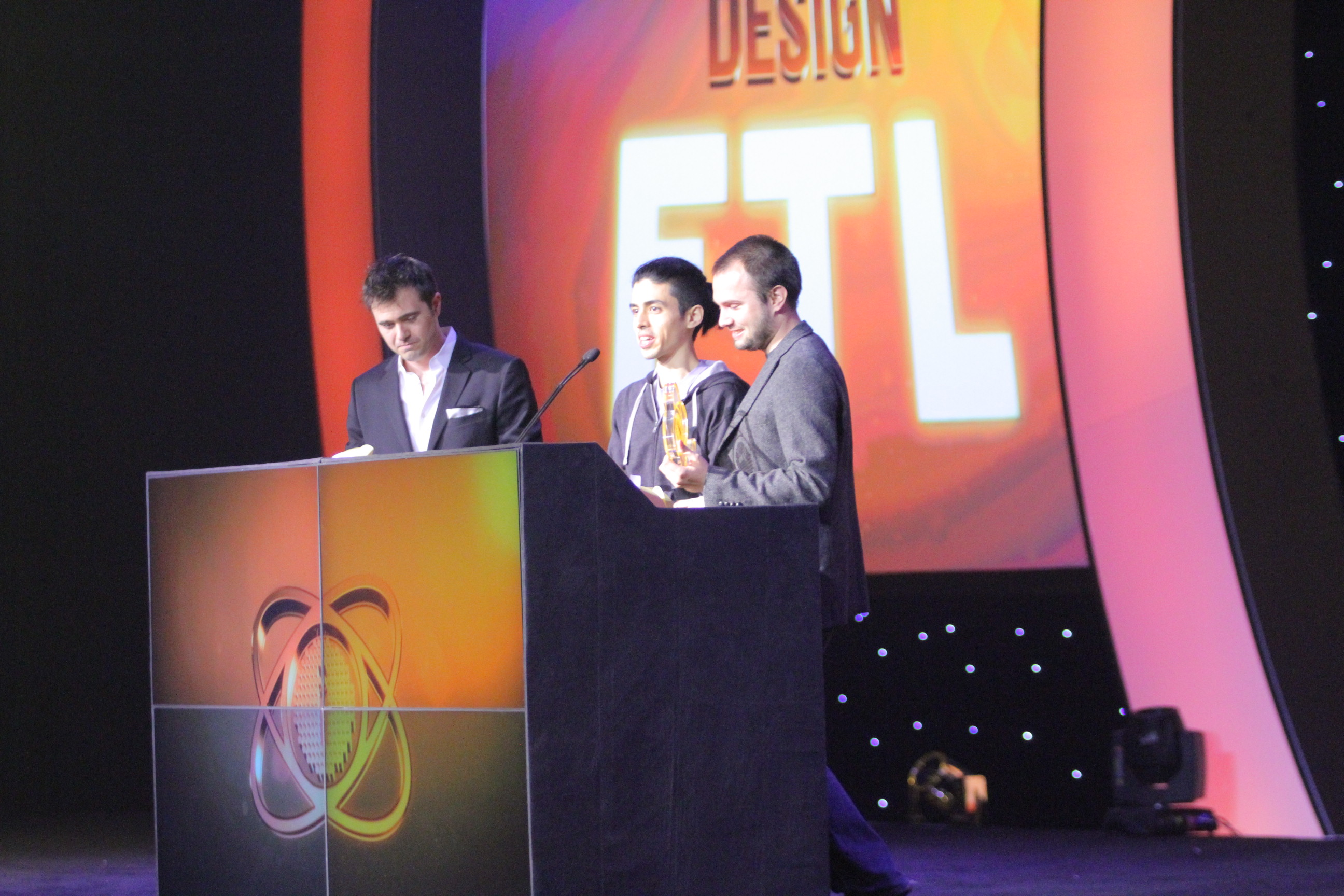
FTL: Faster Than Light developer Subset Games at the IGF 2013

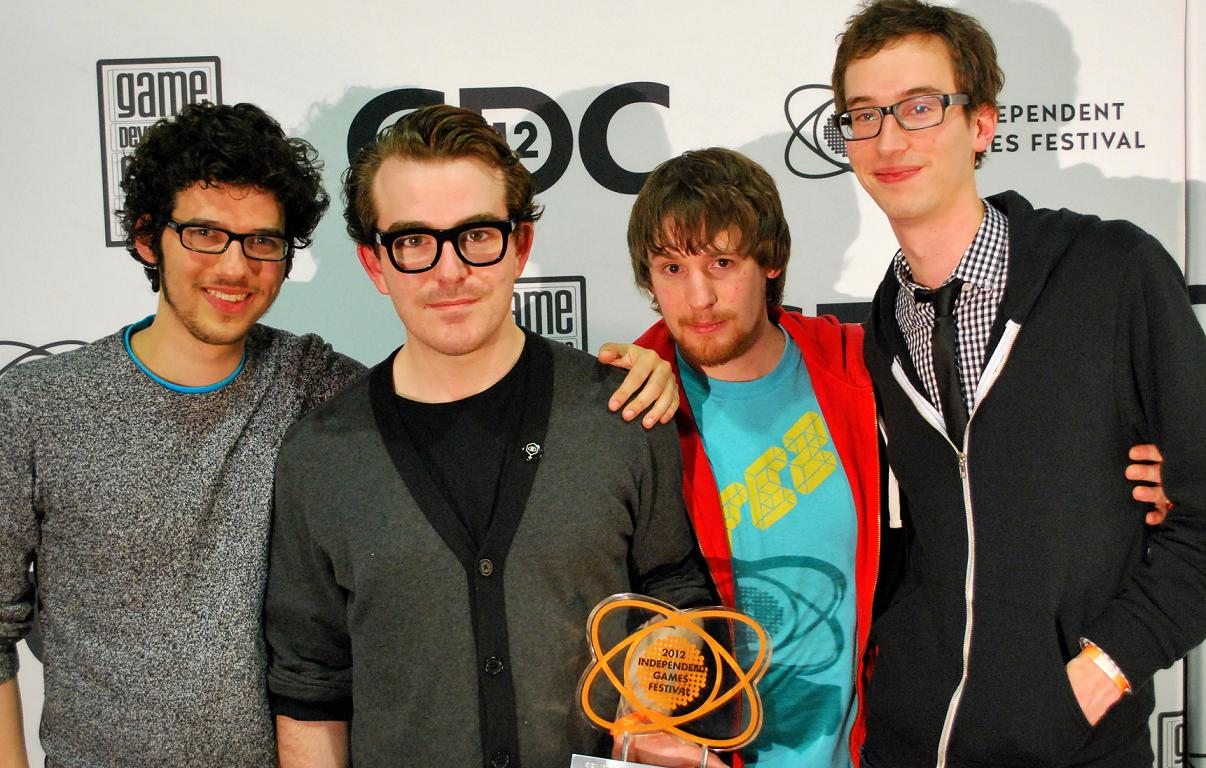
Fez developers with the IGF prize 2012

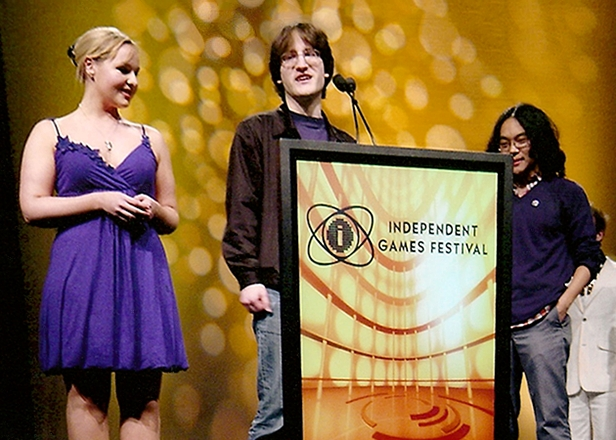
Aquaria voice actor Jenna Sharpe and developers Alec Holowka and Derek Yu on the reception of the IGF prize 2007

As of 2026, there are ten award categories:

- Seumas McNally Grand Prize ($10,000)
- Excellence In Visual Art ($2,000)
- Excellence In Audio ($2,000)
- Excellence in Design ($2,000)
- Excellence in Narrative ($2,000)
- Nuovo Award ($2,000)
- Best Student Game ($2,000)
- Audience Award ($2,000)
- WINGS Awards ($2,000)

Prior to the Festival, developers have the opportunity to submit their game in a playable state to the IGF organization committee for a small fee. These titles are then sent to approximately 250-300 game industry representatives on the Nominating Committee; these representatives include both indie developers and more mainstream developers and publishers. Each Committee member can nominate any of the provided games to one or more of the categories. Then, for each award category, a pre-selected jury of between seven and ten members reviews the nominations and makes a final selection of six finalists (eight for the Nuovo award) and a number of honorable mentions.

The selected finalists are expected to present their games at the IGF during the Games Developers Conference; the show provides them a booth space and access to the convention, but finalists either must secure their own travel and lodgings, or name a proxy to demonstrate their games. During the convention, a separate jury selected by the IGF organization committee will review each game, and just prior to the awards, vote for one game in each category. The only exception is the Audience Award, which is voted through online forms by anyone interested.

== Ceremonies ==
| Game Year | Date of ceremony | Host | Seumas McNally Grand Prize |
|---|---|---|---|
| 1999 | March 15, 1999 | N/A | Fire and Darkness |
| 2000 | March 10, 2000 | N/A | Tread Marks |
| 2001 | March 23, 2001 | N/A | Shattered Galaxy |
| 2002 | March 20, 2002 | N/A | Bad Milk |
| 2003 | March 6, 2003 | N/A | Wild Earth |
| 2004 | March 24, 2004 | N/A | (Open Category) Savage: The Battle for Newerth (Web/Downloadable) Oasis |
| 2005 | March 9, 2005 | N/A | (Open Category) Gish (Web/Downloadable) Wik and the Fable of Souls |
| 2006 | March 22, 2006 | N/A | Darwinia |
| 2007 | March 7, 2007 | Andy Schatz | Aquaria |
| 2008 | February 20, 2008 | Andy Schatz | Crayon Physics Deluxe |
| 2009 | March 25, 2009 | Andy Schatz | Blueberry Garden |
| 2010 | March 11, 2010 | Kyle Gabler and Erin Robinson | Monaco |
| 2011 | March 2, 2011 | Anthony Carboni | Minecraft |
| 2012 | March 8, 2012 | Andy Schatz | Fez |
| 2013 | March 27, 2013 | Andy Schatz | Cart Life |
| 2014 | March 20, 2014 | Nathan Vella | Papers, Please |
| 2015 | March 4, 2015 | Nathan Vella | Outer Wilds |
| 2016 | March 16, 2016 | Nathan Vella | Her Story |
| 2017 | March 1, 2017 | Nina Freeman | Quadrilateral Cowboy |
| 2018 | March 21, 2018 | Trent Kusters | Night in the Woods |
| 2019 | March 20, 2019 | Meg Jayanth | Return of the Obra Dinn |
| 2020 | March 18, 2020 | Trent Kusters | A Short Hike |
| 2021 | July 21, 2021 | Victoria Tran | Umurangi Generation |
| 2022 | March 23, 2022 | Kelly Wallick | Inscryption |
| 2023 | March 22, 2023 | Marina Díez | Betrayal at Club Low |
| 2024 | March 29, 2024 | Trinidad Hermida | Venba |
| 2025 | March 19, 2025 | Emma Kidwell | Consume Me |
| 2026 | March 11, 2026 | Karrie Shao | Titanium Court |

== IGF competition winners ==
Years given below indicate the year when the award was given, with the games or developers being recognized from the previous year. In 2004 and 2005 the awards were split into two separate categories - Open Category (OC) and Web/Downloadable (WD).

=== Seumas McNally Grand Prize (1999-, $10,000) ===
| Year | Winner | Developer(s) | Ref. |
|---|---|---|---|
| 2026 | Titanium Court | AP Thomson | |
| 2025 | Consume Me | Jenny Jiao Hsia, AP Thomson, Jie En Lee, Violet W-P, Ken "coda" Snyder | |
| 2024 | Venba | Visai Games | |
| 2023 | Betrayal at Club Low | Cosmo D Studios | |
| 2022 | Inscryption | Daniel Mullins Games | |
| 2021 | Umurangi Generation | Origame Digital | |
| 2020 | A Short Hike | Adam Robinson-Yu | |
| 2019 | Return of the Obra Dinn | Lucas Pope | |
| 2018 | Night in the Woods | Infinite Fall | |
| 2017 | Quadrilateral Cowboy | Blendo Games | |
| 2016 | Her Story | Sam Barlow | |
| 2015 | Outer Wilds | Team Outer Wilds | |
| 2014 | Papers, Please | Lucas Pope | |
| 2013 | Cart Life | Richard Hofmeier | |
| 2012 | Fez | Polytron | |
| 2011 | Minecraft | Mojang | |
| 2010 | Monaco | Pocketwatch Games | |
| 2009 | Blueberry Garden | Erik Svedang | |
| 2008 | Crayon Physics Deluxe | Kloonigames | |
| 2007 | Aquaria | Bit Blot | |
| 2006 | Darwinia | Introversion Software | |
| 2005 | Gish (OC) Wik and the Fable of Souls (WD) | Chronic Logic Reflexive Entertainment | |
| 2004 | Savage: The Battle for Newerth (OC) Oasis (WD) | S2 Games Mind Control Software | |
| 2003 | Wild Earth | Super X Studios | |
| 2002 | Bad Milk | DreamingMedia | |
| 2001 | Shattered Galaxy | Nexon | |
| 2000 | Tread Marks | Longbow Digital Arts | |
| 1999 | Fire and Darkness | Singularity Software | |

=== Nuovo Award (2009-, $2,000) ===
Awarding innovative games:

| Year | Winner | Developer(s) | Ref. |
|---|---|---|---|
| 2026 | Horses | Andrea Lucco Borlera, Santa Ragione | |
| 2025 | Consume Me | Jenny Jiao Hsia, AP Thomson, Jie En Lee, Violet W-P, Ken "coda" Snyder | |
| 2024 | Anthology of the Killer | thecatamites, Tommy Tone, A. Degen | |
| 2023 | Betrayal at Club Low | Cosmo D Studios | |
| 2022 | Memory Card | Lily Zone | |
| 2021 | Blaseball | The Game Band | |
| 2020 | The Space Between | Christoph Frey | |
| 2019 | Black Room | Cassie McQuater | |
| 2018 | Getting Over It with Bennett Foddy | Bennet Foddy | |
| 2017 | Oiκοςpiel, Book I | David Kanaga | |
| 2016 | Cibele | Nina Freeman | |
| 2015 | Tetrageddon Games | Nathalie Lawhead | |
| 2014 | Luxuria Superbia | Tale of Tales | |
| 2013 | Cart Life | Richard Hofmeier | |
| 2012 | Storyteller | Daniel Benmergui | |
| 2011 | Nidhogg | Messhof | |
| 2010 | Tuning | Cactus | |
| 2009 | Between | Jason Rohrer | |

=== Excellence In Visual Art (1999-, $2,000) ===
| Year | Winner | Developer(s) | Ref. |
|---|---|---|---|
| 2026 | Eclipsium | Housefire | |
| 2025 | Hauntii | Moonloop Games | |
| 2024 | Phonopolis | Amanita Design | |
| 2023 | RPG Time: The Legend of Wright | Deskworks | |
| 2022 | Papetura | Petums | |
| 2021 | Genesis Noir | Feral Cat Den | |
| 2020 | Knights and Bikes | Foam Sword | |
| 2019 | Mirror Drop | Ian Lilley | |
| 2018 | Chuchel | Amanita Design | |
| 2017 | Hyper Light Drifter | Heart Machine | |
| 2016 | Oxenfree | Night School Studio | |
| 2015 | Metamorphabet | Vectorpark | |
| 2014 | Gorogoa | Jason Roberts | |
| 2013 | Kentucky Route Zero | Cardboard Computer | |
| 2012 | Dear Esther | Thechineseroom | |
| 2011 | BIT.TRIP RUNNER | Gaijin Games | |
| 2010 | Limbo | Playdead | |
| 2009 | Machinarium | Amanita Design | |
| 2008 | Fez | Polytron | |
| 2007 | Castle Crashers | The Behemoth | |
| 2006 | Darwinia | Introversion Software | |
| 2005 | Alien Hominid (OC) Wik and the Fable of Souls (WD) | The Behemoth Reflexive Entertainment | |
| 2004 | Spartan (OC) Dr. Blob's Organism (WD) | Slitherine Strategies Digital Eel | |
| 2003 | Wild Earth | Super X Studios | |
| 2002 | Banja Taiyo | Chman.com | |
| 2001 | Hardwood Spades | Silver Creek Entertainment | |
| 2000 | King of Dragon Pass | A Sharp | |
| 1999 | Crime Cities | Techland | |

=== Excellence In Audio (1999-, $2,000) ===
| Year | Winner | Developer(s) | Ref. |
|---|---|---|---|
| 2026 | Baby Steps | Gabe Cuzzillo, Maxi Boch, Bennett Foddy | |
| 2025 | despelote | Julián Cordero, Sebastián Valbuena | |
| 2024 | Rhythm Doctor | 7th Beat Games | |
| 2023 | The Forest Quartet | Mads & Friends | |
| 2022 | Inscryption | Daniel Mullins Games | |
| 2021 | Genesis Noir | Feral Cat Den | |
| 2020 | Mutazione | Die Gute Fabrik | |
| 2019 | Paratopic | Arbitrary Metric | |
| 2018 | Uurnong Uurnlimited | Nifflas Games | |
| 2017 | GoNNER | Art in Heart | |
| 2016 | Mini Metro | Dinosaur Polo Club | |
| 2015 | Ephemerid: A Musical Adventure | SuperChop Games | |
| 2014 | DEVICE 6 | Simogo | |
| 2013 | 140 | Carlsen Games | |
| 2012 | Botanicula | Amanita Design | |
| 2011 | Amnesia: The Dark Descent | Frictional Games | |
| 2010 | Closure | Tyler Glaiel | |
| 2009 | BrainPipe | Digital Eel | |
| 2008 | Audiosurf | Dylan Fitterer | |
| 2007 | Everyday Shooter | Queasy Game | |
| 2006 | Weird Worlds: Return to Infinite Space | Digital Eel | |
| 2005 | Gish (OC) Wik and the Fable of Souls (WD) | Chronic Logic Reflexive Entertainment | |
| 2004 | Anito: Defend a Land Enraged (OC) Dr. Blob's Organism (WD) | Anino Entertainment Digital Eel | |
| 2003 | Terraformers | Pin Interactive | |
| 2002 | Bad Milk | Dreaming Media | |
| 2001 | Chase Ace 2 | Space Time Foam | |
| 2000 | Blix | Gamelab | |
| 1999 | Terminus | Vicarious Visions | |

=== Excellence in Design (1999-, $2,000) ===
The category was previously named Best Game Design (1999-2000), Innovation in Game Design (2001-2006), and Design Innovation (2007-2008).

| Year | Winner | Developer(s) | Ref. |
|---|---|---|---|
| 2026 | Titanium Court | AP Thomson | |
| 2025 | Tactical Breach Wizards | Suspicious Developments | |
| 2024 | Cryptmaster | Paul Hart, Lee Williams | |
| 2023 | The Case of the Golden Idol | Color Gray Games | |
| 2022 | Inscryption | Daniel Mullins Games | |
| 2021 | Teardown | Tuxedo Labs | |
| 2020 | Patrick's Parabox | Patrick Traynor | |
| 2019 | Opus Magnum | Zachtronics | |
| 2018 | Baba is You | Hempuli | |
| 2017 | Quadrilateral Cowboy | Blendo Games | |
| 2016 | Keep Talking and Nobody Explodes | Steel Crate Games | |
| 2015 | Outer Wilds | Team Outer Wilds | |
| 2014 | Papers, Please | Lucas Pope | |
| 2013 | FTL: Faster Than Light | Subset Games | |
| 2012 | Spelunky | Mossmouth | |
| 2011 | Desktop Dungeons | QCF Design | |
| 2010 | Monaco | Pocketwatch Games | |
| 2009 | Musaic Box | KranX Productions | |
| 2008 | World of Goo | 2D Boy | |
| 2007 | Everyday Shooter | Queasy Game | |
| 2006 | Braid | Number None | |
| 2005 | Gish (OC) Wik and the Fable of Souls (WD) | Chronic Logic Reflexive Entertainment | |
| 2004 | Savage: The Battle for Newerth (OC) Oasis (WD) | S2 Games Mind Control Software | |
| 2003 | Wild Earth | Super X Studios | |
| 2002 | Insaniquarium | Flying Bear Entertainment | |
| 2001 | Shattered Galaxy | Nexon | |
| 2000 | Tread Marks | Longbow Digital Arts | |
| 1999 | Resurrection | Mind Control Software | |

=== Excellence in Narrative (2013-, $2,000) ===
| Year | Winner | Developer(s) | Ref. |
|---|---|---|---|
| 2026 | Perfect Tides: Station to Station | Three Bees | |
| 2025 | Caves of Qud | Freehold Games | |
| 2024 | Mediterranea Inferno | Lorenzo Redaelli, EYEGUYS | |
| 2023 | Immortality | Half Mermaid Productions | |
| 2022 | Inscryption | Daniel Mullins Games | |
| 2021 | Umurangi Generation | Origame Digital | |
| 2020 | Heaven's Vault | Inkle | |
| 2019 | Return of the Obra Dinn | Lucas Pope | |
| 2018 | Night in the Woods | Infinite Fall | |
| 2017 | Ladykiller in a Bind | Love Conquers All Games | |
| 2016 | Her Story | Sam Barlow | |
| 2015 | 80 Days | Inkle | |
| 2014 | Papers, Please | Lucas Pope | |
| 2013 | Cart Life | Richard Hofmeier | |

=== Audience Award (1999-, $2,000) ===
| Year | Winner | Developer(s) | Ref. |
|---|---|---|---|
| 2026 | Wednesdays | Pierre Corbinais, The Pixel Hunt, Arte | |
| 2025 | The WereCleaner | Howlin' Hugs | |
| 2024 | RAM: Random Access Mayhem | Xylem Studios | |
| 2023 | Potionomics | Voracious Games | |
| 2022 | Mini Motorways | Dinosaur Polo Club | |
| 2021 | Arrog | Hermanos Magia, Leap Game Studios | |
| 2020 | A Short Hike | Adam Robinson-Yu | |
| 2019 | Ethereal | Nonsense Arts, Nicolás Recabarren, Tomás Batista | |
| 2018 | Celeste | Celeste Team | |
| 2017 | Hyper Light Drifter | Heart Machine | |
| 2016 | Undertale | Toby Fox | |
| 2015 | This War of Mine | 11 bit studios | |
| 2014 | The Stanley Parable | Galactic Cafe | |
| 2013 | FTL: Faster Than Light | Subset Games | |
| 2012 | Frozen Synapse | Mode 7 Games | |
| 2011 | Minecraft | Mojang | |
| 2010 | Heroes of Newerth | S2 Games | |
| 2009 | Cortex Command | Data Realms | |
| 2008 | Audiosurf | Dylan Fitterer | |
| 2007 | Castle Crashers | The Behemoth | |
| 2006 | Dofus | Ankama Games | |
| 2005 | Alien Hominid (OC) N (WD) | The Behemoth Metanet Software | |
| 2004 | Savage: The Battle for Newerth (OC) Yohoho! Puzzle Pirates (WD) | S2 Games Grey Havens | |
| 2003 | Pontifex 2 | Chronic Logic | |
| 2002 | Kung-Fu Chess | Shizmoo Games | |
| 2001 | Shattered Galaxy | Nexon | |
| 2000 | The Rift (Far Gate) | Thrushwave Technology | |
| 1999 | Fire and Darkness | Singularity Software | |

=== Best Student Game (2007-, $2,000) ===
The Best Student Game award was first given out at the 2007 IGF Awards. Prior to that, from 2004-2006, the IGF Student Showcase highlighted ten student-designed games but did not give out an award.

| Year | Winner | Developer(s) | Ref. |
|---|---|---|---|
| 2026 | Poco | Whalefall | |
| 2025 | Slot Waste | Vinny Roca | |
| 2024 | Once Upon a Jester | Bonte Avond | |
| 2023 | Slider | Daniel Carr | |
| 2022 | Live Adventure | Live Adventure Team | |
| 2021 | Vessels | Local Space Survey Corps | |
| 2020 | BORE DOME | Goblin rage | |
| 2019 | after HOURS | Bahiyya Khan, Claire Meekel, Tim Flusk, Abi Meeke | |
| 2018 | Baba is You | Hempuli | |
| 2017 | Un pas fragile | PAF team | |
| 2016 | Beglitched | Jennifer Jiao Hsia, Alec Thomson | |
| 2015 | Close Your | GoodbyeWorld Games | |
| 2014 | Risk of Rain | Hopoo Games | |
| 2013 | Zineth | Arcane Kids | |
| 2012 | Way | Carnegie Mellon University Entertainment Technology Center, The Way Team | |
| 2011 | Fract | Richard E Flanagan | |
| 2010 | Continuity | Ragtime Games | |
| 2009 | Tag: The Power of Paint | DigiPen Institute of Technology | |
| 2008 | Synaesthete | DigiPen Institute of Technology | |
| 2007 | Toblo | DigiPen Institute of Technology | |

Student Showcase 2004-2006:

- 2006: Ballistic • Cloud • Colormental • Narbacular Drop • Ocular Ink • Orblitz • Palette • Sea of Chaos • Goliath • NERO
- 2005: Dyadin • Intergalactic Shopping Maniacs • Mutton Mayhem • Rock Station • Scavenger Hunt • Soccer Ref • Squirrel Squabble • Stars and Stripes • Team Robot • War, Siege & Conquest: Battle for Gaia
- 2004: Dark Archon 2 • Fatal Traction • Growbot • Hexvex • Hyperbol • Ice Wars • Kube Kombat • Scrapped • Treefort Wars • Xazzon

=== WINGS Award (2026-, $2,000) ===
- 2026: 13Z: The Zodiac Trials
- 2025: Consume Me

== Other awards without prize money ==
=== alt.ctrl.GDC Award (2017-) ===
For games that feature unusual controls or user interactions. In 2020, due to the cancellation of the physical GDC conference as a result of the coronavirus outbreak, this award wasn't given.

- 2026: Proyecto EXO
- 2025: ChromaCorp
- 2024: Chú Mó
- 2019: Hot Swap
- 2018: Puppet Pandemonium
- 2017: Fear Sphere

=== Sponsor Awards (2004-2019) ===
- 2019 ID@Xbox Gaming Heroes Award: Jerry Lawson
- 2018 ID@Xbox Award: SpecialEffect
- 2016 ID@Xbox Rising Star Award: Girls Make Games — The Hole Story
- 2012 Microsoft Xbox Live Arcade Award: Super T.I.M.E. Force
- 2011 Direct2Drive Vision Award: Amnesia: The Dark Descent
- 2010 Direct2Drive Vision Award: Max and the Magic Marker
- 2009 Direct2Drive Vision Award: Osmos
- 2008 Gleemie Awards (1x $5,000, 1x $3,000, 1x $2,000): Desktop Tower Defense, Skyrates, Quadradius
- 2007 GameTap Awards (1x $10,000, 2 x $5,000): Everyday Shooter, Blast Miner, Roboblitz
- 2006 Adultswim.com Award ($5,000): Dodge That Anvil
- 2005 Cartoon Network "Project Goldmaster" Award (making a game for Cartoon Network): Digital Builders
- 2004 AOL/Cartoon Network "Project Goldmaster" Award (making a game for Cartoon Network): Flashbang Studios

== Former competitions ==
=== Technical Excellence (1999-2013, $3,000) ===
| Year | Winner | Developer(s) | Ref. |
|---|---|---|---|
| 2013 | Little Inferno | Tomorrow Corporation | |
| 2012 | Antichamber | Alexander Bruce | |
| 2011 | Amnesia: The Dark Descent | Frictional Games | |
| 2010 | Limbo | Playdead | |
| 2009 | Cortex Command | Data Realms | |
| 2008 | World of Goo | 2D Boy | |
| 2007 | Bang! Howdy | Three Rings Design | |
| 2006 | Darwinia | Introversion Software | |
| 2005 | Alien Hominid (OC) RocketBowl (WD) | The Behemoth LargeAnimal | |
| 2004 | Savage: The Battle for Newerth (OC) Yohoho! Puzzle Pirates (WD) | S2 Games Grey Havens | |
| 2003 | Reiner Knizia's Samurai | Klear Games | |
| 2002 | Ace of Angels | Flying Rock Enterprises | |
| 2001 | Shattered Galaxy | Nexon | |
| 2000 | Tread Marks | Longbow Digital Arts | |
| 1999 | Terminus | Vicarious Visions | |

=== Best Mobile Game (2011-2012, $3,000) ===
From 2007 to 2010, there was a separate event called IGF Mobile for mobile phone games.

| Year | Winner | Developers | Ref. |
|---|---|---|---|
| 2012 | Beat Sneak Bandit | Simogo | |
| 2011 | Helsing's Fire | Ratloop Excellence | |

=== Best Web Browser Game (2006-2008, $2,500) ===
This category replaced the separate prizes for Web/Downloadable games awarded in 2004 & 2005.

| Year | Winner | Developers | Ref. |
|---|---|---|---|
| 2008 | Iron Dukes | One Ton Ghost | |
| 2007 | Samorost 2 | Amanita Design | |
| 2006 | Dad 'N Me | Tom Fulp, Dan Paladin | |

=== IGF Modding Competition (2006-2007) ===
A separate annual video game modding competition was held in 2006 and 2007.

2007 Mod Awards ($7,000):

Best Mod ($5,000 overall): Weekday Warrior (Half-Life 2)
Best Singleplayer FPS Mod ($500): Weekday Warrior (Half-Life 2)
Best Multiplayer FPS Mod ($500): Eternal Silence (Half-Life 2)
Best RPG Mod ($500): Darkness over Daggerford (Neverwinter Nights)
Best 'Other' Mod ($500): Spawns Of Deflebub (Unreal Tournament 2004)

2006 Mod Awards ($10,000):

Best Mod – Doom 3 ($2,500): Last Man Standing Coop
Best Mod – Half-Life 2 ($2,500): Dystopia
Best Mod – Neverwinter Nights ($2,500): Rose Of Eternity: Chapter 1
Best Mod – Unreal Tournament 2004 ($2,500): Path Of Vengeance

== Records ==
=== Most Awards - Game ===
- 4 awards: Inscryption, Savage: The Battle for Newerth, Shattered Galaxy, Wik and the Fable of Souls
- 3 awards: Alien Hominid, Cart Life, Darwinia, Gish, Papers, Please, Tread Marks, Wild Earth

=== Most Awards - Developer ===
- 5 awards: Amanita Design, AP Thomson, Lucas Pope, S2 Games, The Behemoth
- 4 awards: Chronic Logic, Daniel Mullins Games, Digital Eels, Nexon, Reflexive Entertainment
- 3 awards: DigiPen Insititute of Technology, Introversion Software, Jenny Jiao Hsia, Longbow Digital Arts, Mind Control Software, Richard Hofmeier, Super X Studios

== See also ==
- Indiecade
- Independent video game development
