= Fire and Darkness =

Cancelled real-time strategy video game

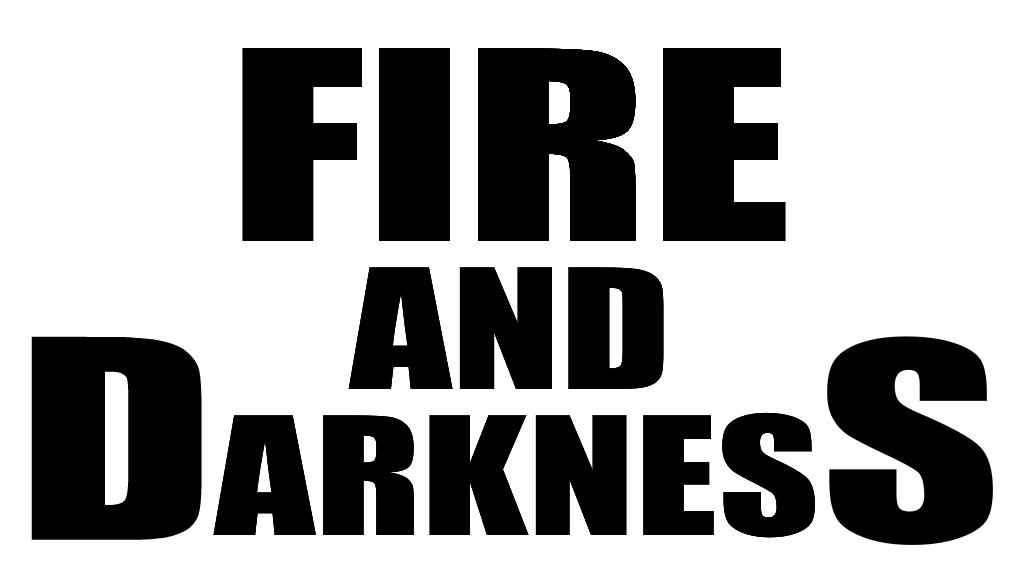
- Developer: Singularity Software
- Platform: Microsoft Windows
- Release: Cancelled
- Genre: Real-time strategy
- Mode: Single-player

Fire and Darkness is a cancelled three-dimensional real-time strategy video game developed by Singularity Software. The game consists of a player controlling one of two factions, and their main mission is to defeat the enemy faction to secure the planet's resources.

The game's development started in 1996 and lasted for three years, with developers working mostly during the summer. Although the project was incomplete, it became the first game to win the Seumas McNally Grand Prize at the Independent Games Festival of 1999. The development team invested time, but no money into the project. However, the game was later cancelled indefinitely. There has since been talk of a future port, using a modern engine.

== Gameplay ==
The player controls one of two factions, and their main mission is to defeat the enemy faction to secure the planet's resources. To accomplish this mission, the player spends resources (defined in-game as terajoules) to build combat units and facilities used to engage in war against their opponents, or to produce more resources. According to the demo released by Singularity Software, five planets were featured in the game, and both factions shared the same type of combat units and facilities.

The game incorporates a player-controlled camera system. Combat units (both ground units and aircraft) have inertia. The player can make their units move anywhere in the map, given that Fire and Darkness is not designed using a grid-like system like other contemporary games such as Warcraft II.

== Development ==
Fire and Darkness was developed by Singularity Software, an American studio composed of seven individuals. David Scherer, Adam Stubblefield and David Rosenthal started working on the game as early as 1996, with Mark Feghali helping them craft the networking engine featured in the game. Ari Heitner later joined the team, focusing on the game's user interface, sound code and scenario design. Ian Dale served as the main artist of the game, and Austin Huang provided the music. According to Scherer and Rosenthal, the game was done within three years, with the team mostly working in summer given that all of them attended either high school or college. According to Next Generation magazine, no money was spent producing the game.

Despite its three-year development cycle, Fire and Darkness was not completed, and therefore never released. David Rosenthal commented after winning the Seumas McNally Grand Prize that the game was "sitting on a hard disk taking up bits".

== Reception ==
Fire and Darkness became the first game win to the Seumas McNally Grand Prize at the Independent Games Festival of 1999. It also received the Audience Choice award. Next Generation named it a "kind of hybrid between Myth and Total Annihilation".
