= Tactical Breach Wizards =

2024 turn-based strategy video game

- Developer: Suspicious Developments
- Publisher: Suspicious Developments
- Engine: Unity
- Platform: Windows
- Release: WW: August 22, 2024
- Genre: Turn-based tactics
- Mode: Single-player

Tactical Breach Wizards is a 2024 turn-based tactics video game by Suspicious Developments. Players control a team of wizards who fight to stop an international conspiracy. The game is presented through a series of missions, which are humorous and involve espionage thriller elements, and connected by cutscenes and dialogue sequences.

Tactical Breach Wizards was released for Windows on August 22, 2024. It became a best-seller on Steam on release, and was nominated for multiple game awards, including the Golden Joystick Awards, D.I.C.E. Awards, Hugo Awards, and the Independent Games Festival awards, where it won "Excellence in Design".

== Gameplay ==
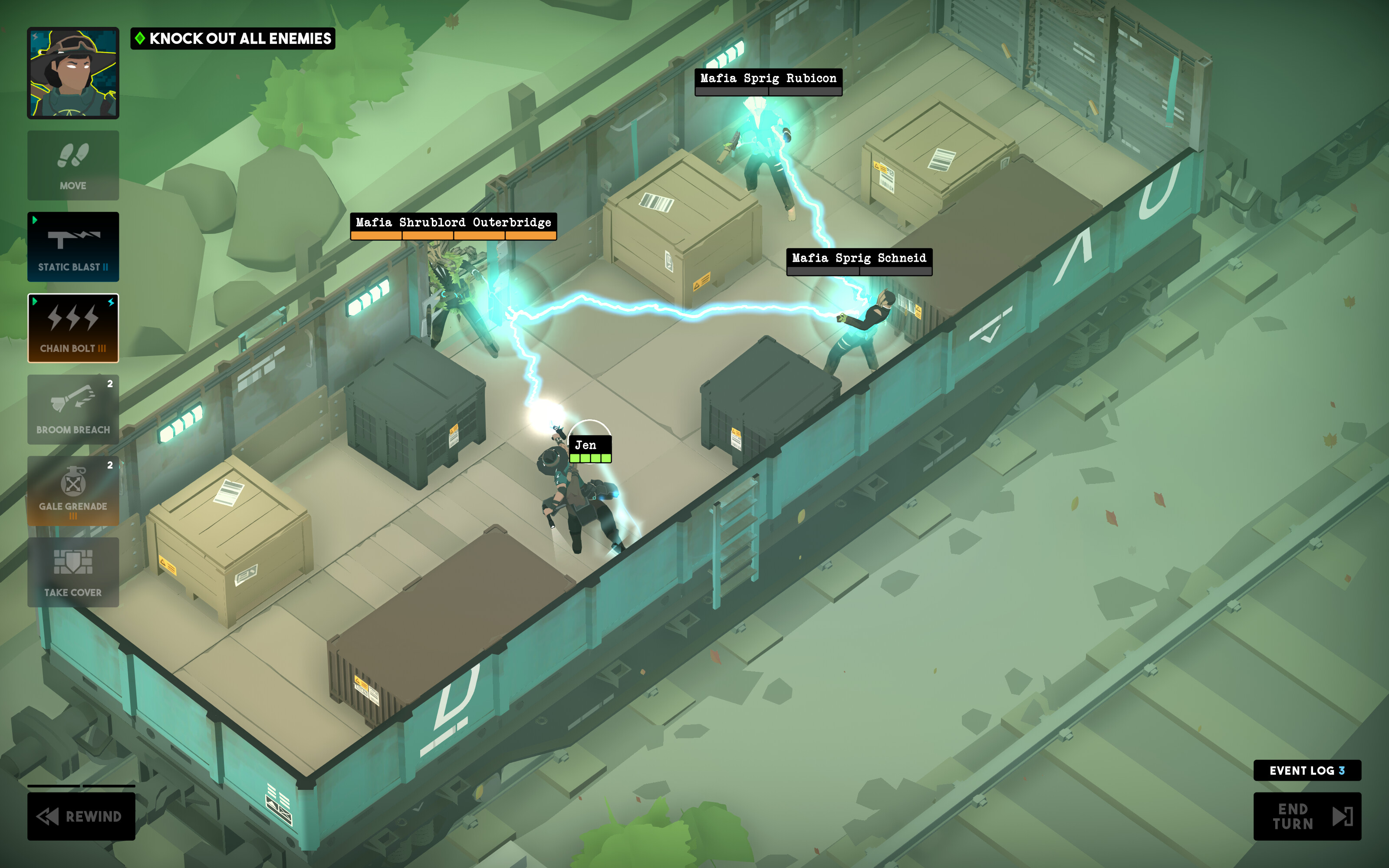
A player-controlled character striking three enemies with chain lightning.

Players control a group of outcast wizards who are fighting against a theocracy and private military companies in an urban fantasy setting. Up to five wizards can be on the team. Each wizard has a unique set of skills. For example, a weather witch can summon lightning bolts that can push opponents around, and a "necromedic" (a portmanteau of necromancer and medic) can revive people if they have died. Further skills can be unlocked as they complete missions and become more experienced.

Before breaching a door, the team engages in banter. Breaching results in turn-based, tactical combat. During combat, the team's seer can briefly glimpse the future, resulting in players seeing how their choices will play out. If players dislike the result, they can undo their action and try a different tactic. This is possible up until players end their turn. Each level has both required and optional objectives. The optional objectives, such as knocking someone out of a window or defeating all enemies within two turns, raise team members' confidence. This unlocks specialty outfits.

Missions can be replayed, but they do not give additional experience points. After completing a mission, there are cutscenes, further conversations, and anxiety dreams, all of which can advance the plot. The anxiety dreams, which are optional, feature special challenges that, when completed, unlock new special abilities. After winning the game, players can continue through post-game challenges. There is also a harder difficulty mode, and Tactical Breach Wizards includes a level editor.

== Plot ==
Tactical Breach Wizards is set in a fictional world with a modern level of technology, but where a small proportion of people become wizards: having awakened their powers in life-threatening situations, they develop magical abilities that are unique to each individual, and can also create enchanted objects and tools for others to use. Two Navy wizards, seer Zan Vesker and chronomancer Liv Kennedy, raid a ship off the island country of Medil. Zan's skills let him foresee the consequences of his possible actions. Facing capture, Liv orders Zan to let her go so he can save a hostage; afterward, Zan is dishonorably discharged and returns home.

Liv resurfaces years later, having joined up with private military company Reactor. Trailing her to a police station, Zan meets storm witch Jen Kellen, a private investigator who has been tracking mob doctor Dessa Banks. Liv's team, which includes a pyromancer, a traffic wizard, and a druid hitman, abducts Banks to a base in neighboring Liboli. Jan and Zen locate Banks with a spell and are able to free her. Banks is a necromancer who can only heal those who are already dead; she was conscripted by Liv to repeatedly revert the effects of a mysterious magical ailment. The three then follow Liv to the theocracy of Kalan, where they are rescued by rebel leader Dall Sabin and find themselves working alongside Liv's team to topple the oppressive government. Liv executes her hitman, Rion, for opposing her, and he switches sides when Banks revives him.

Reactor has secretly developed a consistent way to manufacture wizards using a mineral called mana. In a meeting with Zan, Liv tells him that he actually froze up on the ship and failed to save the hostage, who was a test subject for the process. Driven by trauma and guilt, Zan subconsciously replaced the memory with one of the other possible outcomes he had foreseen. As publicizing Reactor's research would instantly spark a global arms race and possible world war, Liv's plan is to preemptively destroy stockpiles of mana in all other countries then seize Medil, home of most of the world's mana mines, leaving Reactor the only superpower. Reactor was involved in Kalan because the government there had caught wind and was about to launch its own invasion of Medil. Liv herself has been using mana, making her nearly unstoppable but also causing her health issues.

Liv kills Zan's team but Banks conceals herself and resurrects the others. Connecting with local militia in Medil, they take back control of the capital and trick Liv's pyromancer into setting off a chain reaction that burns out the nation's mana reserves and connected underground veins, saving Medil from being perpetually fought over by foreign powers. Zan distracts Liv in the meantime, and as his teammates arrive, they are able to overcome Liv's defenses and kill her. The player can choose to leave her dead or revive her to stand trial. Multiple endings are possible for each character, describing their actions after the conclusion.

== Development ==
Developer Tom Francis was previously a game journalist. The idea of making a turn-based tactical game came from issues he had with XCOM 2. Although one of his favorite games, Francis felt it had "big, serious problems" that could improved upon, such as reducing frustration by making the level design simpler. His issues became the design document for a new game. The concept of Call of Duty-style militarized wizards came from a joke among the writers at PC Gamer. Rainbow Six: Vegas 2 inspired the SWAT tactics, and Douglas Adams influenced the writing.

The ability to test out tactics and see the results came from Francis' frustration with losing team members in XCOM for what seemed like arbitrary reasons. Francis discussed this with the developers of Into the Breach, which relies on its user interface to inform players how actions will play out. Francis initially thought it would be better to forgo using UI elements, but players did not like repeatedly testing tactics without UI feedback.

One of the protagonists, Jen, was originally designed to be an ex-cop. The George Floyd protests in 2020 caused Francis to consider whether it was a good idea to have an ex-cop leading SWAT-style raids. He tried rewriting Jen's background to incorporate commentary on police violence, but feedback from friends convinced him it was a bad idea. The topic was too big to tackle in a character's background, and his efforts were tonally off from the dry, comedic take on everything else there. Instead, Francis made Jen a private investigator.

Tactical Breach Wizards was first announced in 2017, with a trailer released in 2019. The game was playable in a closed beta test in 2020, which included 3 developer-created levels and a level editor for fan use. A demo was released in June 2024 on Steam, ahead of the game's release.

Suspicious Developments released Tactical Breach Wizards for Windows on August 22, 2024. The special edition includes developer commentary, which itself can be used as weapon in-game and thrown at opponents.

== Reception ==
Reception

Aggregate scores
Aggregator	Score
Metacritic	87/100
OpenCritic	100% recommend

Review scores
Publication	Score
Edge	8/10
Eurogamer	5/5
GameSpot	8/10
IGN	8/10
PC Gamer (US)	88/100
The Guardian	5/5

Tactical Breach Wizards received "generally favorable" reviews according to review aggregator website Metacritic. OpenCritic determined that 100% of critics recommend the game. PC Gamer said it avoids being "XCOM in a robe and wizard hat" by focusing on many short combats that have many tactical options without focusing on having a single puzzle game-like solution. GameSpot and Eurogamer likewise praised the freedom granted by the ability to take back moves, allowing players to experiment and find their own solutions. Rock Paper Shotgun, GameSpot, Eurogamer and Edge all praised its ability to appeal to both hardcore and casual fans of tactics games.

PC Gamer enjoyed completing the optional objectives, many of which encouraged them to figure out fun combos. Rock Paper Shotgun compared the challenges to the stylistic stunts in John Wick and praised Tactical Breach Wizards' ability to challenge players without ever becoming frustratingly difficult. Near the end of the game, PC Gamer said the characters become enjoyably overpowered, and IGN said it remains fun despite being somewhat easy. Rock Paper Shotgun said one skill was so overpowered, they used it almost exclusively. GameSpot, however, found there to be occasional difficulty spikes.

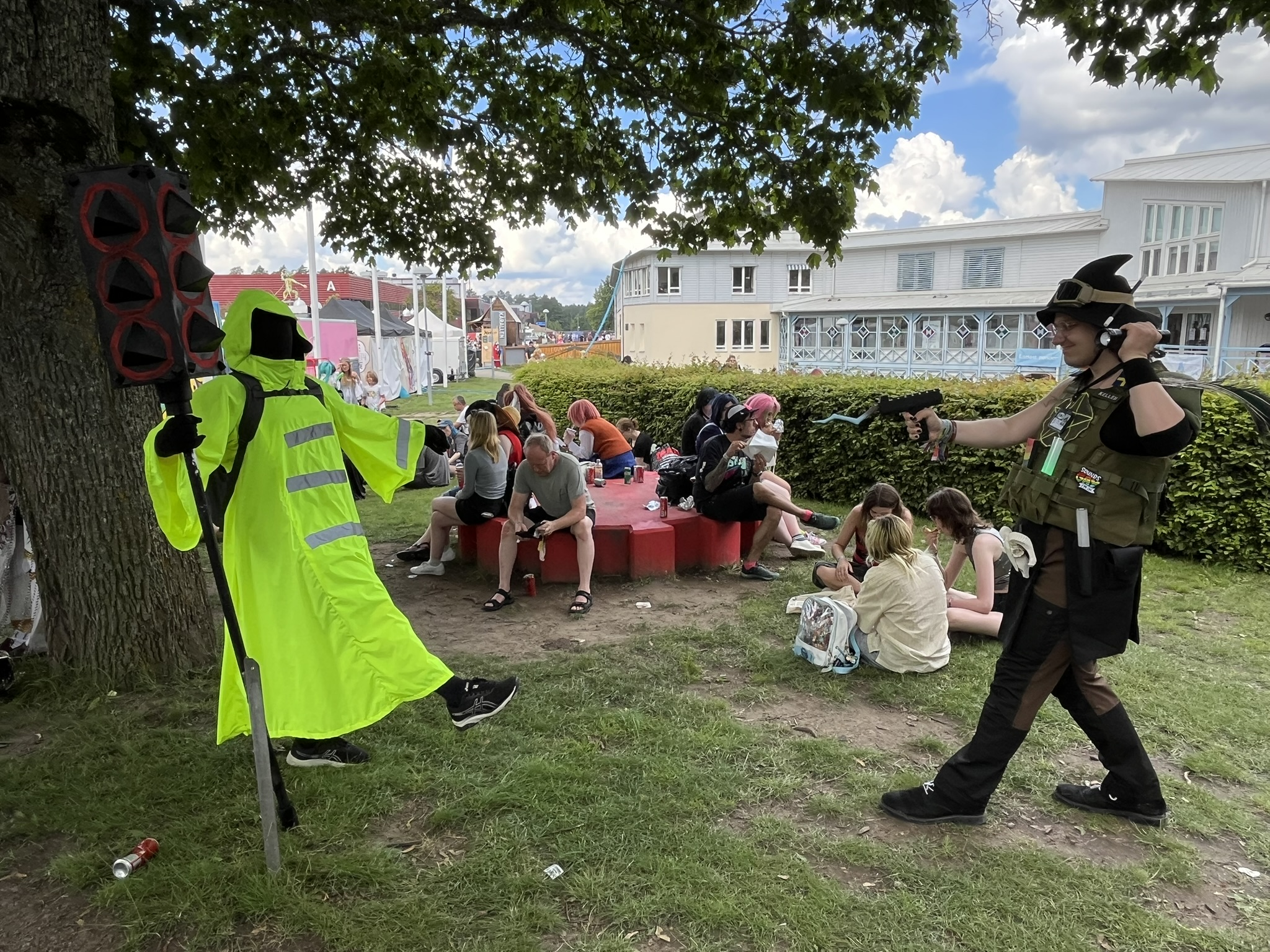
Tactical Breach Wizards cosplayers at NärCon Sommar 2025.

Commenting on the story, PC Gamer said it is both "very funny" and "unfailingly sincere", which they felt elevated it beyond being a good tactical game into "something memorable". Rock Paper Shotgun said they found even the menus to have profundity and said it has "brilliant, laugh-out-loud funny writing". GameSpot said the deconstruction of Tom Clancy-style thrillers made the campaign "a joy", and The Guardian praised its ability to turn its silly premise into "a genuinely intriguing espionage thriller" while avoiding that genre's questionable ethics. GameSpot felt the game as a whole was "both funny and endearing", featuring a self-awareness that they said was earned. IGN felt the story was "solid enough" but said the dialogue is "absolutely stellar throughout".

After release, Tactical Breach Wizards became the third-bestselling item on Steam behind Black Myth: Wukong and the Steam Deck, and the user reviews were 98% positive as of August 2024. GameSpot and Ars Technica included it in lists of the best games of 2024, and Rock Paper Shotgun labeled it a "bestest best".

=== Awards ===
Year	Ceremony	Category	Result	Ref.
2024	Golden Joystick Awards	Best Storytelling	Nominated	
2024	Golden Joystick Awards	Best Indie Game - Self-Published	Nominated	
2024	Golden Joystick Awards	PC Game of the Year	Nominated	
2025	28th Annual D.I.C.E. Awards	Strategy/Simulation Game of the Year	Nominated	
2025	Independent Games Festival	Seumas McNally Grand Prize	Honorable mention	
2025	Independent Games Festival	Excellence in Design	Won	
2025	Independent Games Festival	Excellence in Narrative	Honorable mention	
2025	21st British Academy Games Awards	Game Design	Nominated	
2025	Hugo Awards	Best Game or Interactive Work	Nominated	
