= Metamorphabet =

2015 video game

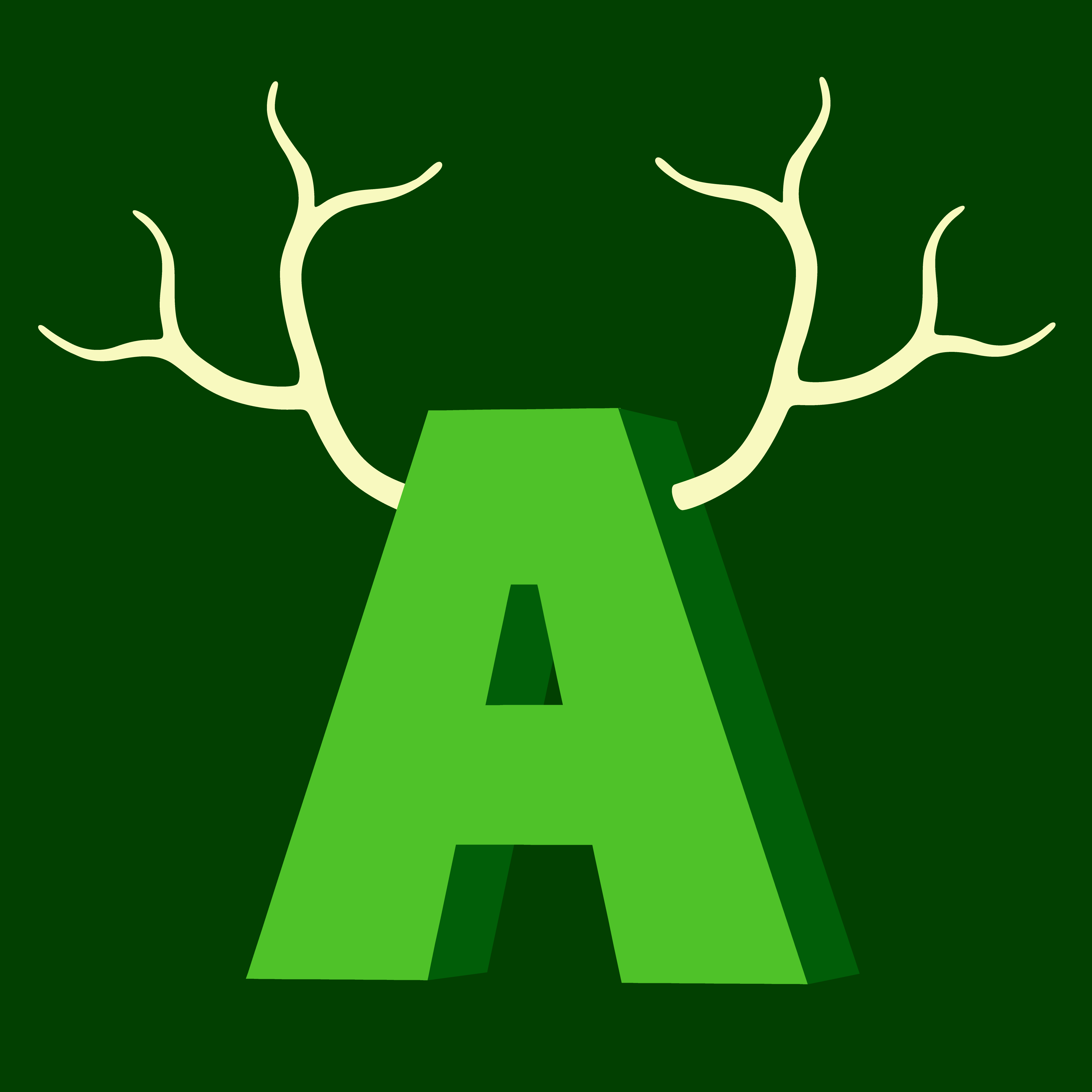
- Developer: Vectorpark
- Publisher: Vectorpark
- Platforms: iOS, Android, Microsoft Windows, OS X
- Release: iOS: WW: February 12, 2015; Windows, OS X: WW: April 29, 2015
- Mode: Single-player

Metamorphabet is a 2015 puzzle video game developed by Vectorpark.

== Gameplay ==
The players touch the letters, which morph into words.

The player interacts with each letter to proceed through the alphabet. For instance, the letter A grows antlers, becomes an arch, and begins to amble. Then it is replaced by the letter B, which grows a beard, then a beak, then bugs come out of the beak. The most common one is the butterfly. The letters and words are read aloud.

== Development ==
Metamorphabet is an iOS game developed by Patrick Smith. He had previously worked on the 2009 Windosill. Smith designed the game to feel "intuitive" and "as natural as possible" for all users, but also designed to be accessible to young children. The game was in development for three years but only came to fruition when Smith thought of having the letters turn into words. The game was released for iOS devices on February 12, 2015, and for Windows and OS X via Steam on April 29.

== Reception ==
Metamorphabet won the 2015 Independent Games Festival's Excellence in Visual Art award and was a finalist for the Seumas McNally Grand Prize. It was one of ten Apple Design Award recipients in 2015. Reviewers noted the game's charm and intuitiveness.

Andrew Webster of The Verge wrote that Metamorphabet helps kids learn the alphabet and vocabulary, though the game "isn't educational in the traditional sense", as it does not force the player in one direction. He described the game as "more playful than instructive" and "more of a toy than a textbook", making it a suitable first video game for his two-year-old daughter. Webster thought the gameplay was "charming and intuitive" and "fun ... to watch". Evan Narcisse of Kotaku similarly wrote that the game was the first his four-year-old was allowed to play alone. He noted that she struggled with games like Cut the Rope and Where's My Water, and thought that a game like Flower or Hohokum would be her first, but found Metamorphabet to be sufficiently magical in that it inspired curiosity without being "overly earnest or treacly".
