= Bad Milk =

2000 video game

- Developer: Dreaming Media
- Designers: Ted Skolnick; Mick Skolnick
- Programmer: Ted Skolnick
- Artist: Mick Skolnick
- Engine: Macromedia Director 7
- Platforms: Microsoft Windows, Mac OS
- Release: October 12, 2000
- Genre: Puzzle
- Mode: Single-player

Bad Milk is a puzzle video game developed by New York City-based developer Dreaming Media, the working name of brothers Ted and Mick Skolnick. It was originally released on October 12, 2000, for Microsoft Windows and Mac OS. Created entirely in Macromedia Director 7 and intended to be an art game, the game features a number of puzzles involving full-motion video and audio clues. It won the Seumas McNally Grand Prize at the 2002 Independent Games Festival, as well as the award for Innovation in Audio.

== Background and development ==
Mick Skolnick told GameDev.net in 2002 that he had worked in the cosmetics industry, retouching photographs for advertisements, after studying art in college; his brother Ted was a software developer and former engineering student. According to the developers, Bad Milk was created to serve as "video installation art", something the pair were keen to get involved with but which proved too expensive. Mick said the concept of moving this into a video game was the "best way to combine our skills". The pair worked out of their apartments in Queens, New York, since they couldn't afford to rent office space in the city.

Bad Milk was developed in Macromedia Director 7. Mick appears in puzzles throughout the game, recorded with a Sony Handycam and edited in Adobe Premiere. The pair worked part-time on the project, taking a year to develop the final game alongside professional work; they estimated production costs at $12,000 (equivalent to $22,435 in 2025), including hardware. It was released on a hybrid disc in order to be playable on both Microsoft Windows and Mac OS.

A demo version of the game was made available on the developer's website, along with a link to purchase the full game. As of 2016, it is not possible to purchase the full game from Dreaming Media. To support the game's release, the pair entered a piece of time-lapse footage used in the game into San Francisco-based artist James Buckhouse's online exhibition of screen savers, Refresh: The Art of the Screen Saver. The footage depicts Mick's hair growing and, when reversed, receding and is used in the game's final puzzle.

== Concept and gameplay ==
Correct responses to puzzles are combined in the game's penultimate puzzle, consisting of a combination lock in the form of developer Mick Skolnick's head.

Bad Milk begins with a first-person full-motion video (FMV), in which the player drinks spoiled milk and collapses onto the table. This launches a puzzle game in which the player must complete a series of minigames to obtain clues to "escape" their situation. The player is spoken to in various phone calls by an unseen third party and given hints to complete the puzzles. Clues are hidden in FMV clips including a "dismembered bald head, a disembodied voice, a drowning man, and chronic smokers".

At some points, the player is dropped into a dark area and must use sound cues to navigate to the next puzzle. The end goal is to find the code for a combination lock in the form of a human head, then to find a two-word passphrase to unlock the final video clip, which depicts the player's rebirth in first-person. Mick told GameDev.net that the overarching themes include reincarnation and mortality, with the "prize" being "birth, along with unconditional love".

== Reception ==
Ted Skolnick submitted the game to the Independent Games Festival in 2002, after reading about it in passing in a gaming magazine. It was ultimately awarded the Seumas McNally Grand Prize and the Innovation in Audio award at a ceremony at the Game Developers Conference in San Jose, California; Alex Dunne, then chairman of the IGF, said in a statement that "the 2002 IGF honorees exemplify the 'outside the box' thinking that keeps innovation at the forefront of video game development". In an awards retrospective, MacADDICT referred to the game as "akin to attending a modern art exhibit you don't quite understand".

In 2007, Anthony Burch of Destructoid wrote in a retrospective of the game that it was "immensely flawed, but hugely original", and "a difficult game to describe without playing it for yourself." Researcher Jesper Juul, also a member of the jury for the Independent Games Festival, wrote in 2014 that he considered the game a "return to 1990s CD-ROM experiments".

=== Awards ===
Year	Award	Category	Result	Ref.
2002	Independent Games Festival Awards	Seumas McNally Grand Prize	Won	
2002	Independent Games Festival Awards	Innovation in Audio	Won	
