= Net Jet =

Video game system

- Manufacturer: Hasbro
- Released: February 11, 2007 (Soft); September 6, 2007 (Wide)
- Lifespan: 2007-2008
- Media: QiGo USB keys, digital distribution
- Related: Game.com; Control-Vision

Net Jet is a Windows PC-based game system introduced by Hasbro (under the Tiger Electronics brand) in 2007. The game system is in a controller form factor. The Net Jet controller is plugged into the USB port in a computer and automatically started up. It downloaded games via a required Internet connection. A dozen featured games could be played on a trial basis, or unlocked via plug in "game keys" (which are essentially jumper blocks). The Net Jet came in seven different color variations. Net Jet support officially ended December 31, 2009.

== Operation and features ==
Unlike other self-contained game systems that fit entirely in a controller, the Net Jet itself can not play games on its own. It does not contain any circuitry to display graphics, generate sound or a microprocessor to play games, instead it relies entirely on the host computer to act as the "game console". For this reason, its performance was potentially hindered by slower and less capable computers. Games consist of a mix of real-time 3D texture mapping, to simple 2D Java and flash-based games.

The Net Jet makes itself plug n play by containing a small bit of firmware in the controller. When plugged in, a virtual CD-ROM image (400K in size) would automatically mount, then proceed to download and install its software via the Internet so to display a menu selection screen. Any games selected would then also need to be downloaded and stored on the computer. The Net Jet is a proprietary controller, it can only be used for its own games and not as a standard PC gamepad controller (it was detected as a USB hub, as opposed to a game controller by the computer). The controller itself had 7 buttons (two shoulder, four front and one 'start'), D-pad and analog thumb stick.

== Game keys ==
The Net Jet system is played by inserting a key into the controller. It came with a free demo key. The demo key allowed a user to try each of the Net Jet games for 30 minutes. Players would then have to purchase one of twelve different game keys in order to unlock each individual game already on the computer. Despite the actual games being stored on the computer's hard drive, without a key inserted the game system would not function.

Later on, the demo key was replaced in branded bundled with some of the Net Jet's marquee titles, such as Transformers Battle Universe or Bubble Bonanza, for example.

Game keys primarily function as jumper blocks (an activation switch) to unlock games on the computer. Actual games are downloaded and stored, along with save game settings, onto the computer through an Internet connection. Games or save-status are not stored on the keys. The keys however permanently "remember" which three choice games the player selected via a 1K embedded EEPROM IC.

=== Featured games ===
Physical releases sold at retail in the form of USB game keys.

- Bubble Bonanza
- The Fairly OddParents - Timmy's Roach Rampage
- Foster's Home for Imaginary Friends - Bugging Out
- The Grim Adventures of Billy & Mandy - Freaky Freezeday
- Kool Kart Racers
- Littlest Pet Shop
- Marble Blast XP
- Mission: Paintball
- Peak Performance Snowboarding
- SpongeBob SquarePants - SpongeBob's Pizza Toss
- Super Soaker Water Fight
- Transformers Battle Universe - Features various Transformers characters from different series in a side-view fighting game.

=== Choice games ===
Purchasing a game key also enabled a user to unlock three Internet Java/Flash-based games playable with the controller, called "Choice Games". Many of these titles were also available on other web gaming portals but had been retooled to support Net Jet specific button inputs.

- Alus Revenge
- Arkadium Minigolf
- Avatar: The Last Airbender - Four Nations
- Avatar: The Last Airbender - Ashes in the Air
- Beach Sudoku
- Ben 10 - Battle Ready
- Bombsquad
- Camp Lazlo - Jelly Beans
- Catscratch - Catfight
- Dancing Queen
- Danny Phantom - Freak For All
- Darts
- Ed, Edd n Eddy - Lunchroom Rumble
- Freekick Football
- The Grim Adventures Of Billy & Mandy - Harum Scarum
- Jimmy Timmy Power Hour - Shirley's Revenge
- Littlest Pet Shop - My Teeniest Town
- Mahjong Garden
- Mosquito Mayhem
- My Gym Partner's A Monkey - Hall Of The Wild
- Penguin Power
- Skeeball
- Skeet Shot
- Squirrel Boy - Screwball Squeeze
- The Stakeout
- Toy Chest Mahjong
- Treasure Hunt
- Typewriter
- Volleyball
- Word Search
- The X's - Dinner Danger

=== Deluxe games ===
With a game key, the user was also granted a free 30-minute demo, with the option to purchase the full game, of a variety of standard computer games, called "Deluxe Games." These titles were played with the keyboard and mouse, rather than the Net Jet controller itself.

- Dino & Aliens
- Galapago
- Granny in Paradise
- Magic Match
- Treasures Of The Deep
- Wik and the Fable of Souls

== Discontinuation ==
As of January 1, 2009, Hasbro was no longer legally obligated to maintain or continue its website operation. Support, however, was extended a year past said date, as at start up the software displays a pop-up disclaimer stating the product has been discontinued and support ended as of December 31, 2009. All online service has since been shut down, and as a result, the product no longer functions.

The actual message from Net Jet software when controller is plugged-in:

"PLEASE NOTE: We hope you have enjoyed your NET JET Online Gaming System. Unfortunately, NET JET products have been discontinued. This site will no longer be available on or about December 31, 2009. We appreciate your interest in Hasbro products. If you have any questions, please contact Hasbro Customer Service."
