= BrainPipe =

2008 video game

- Developer(s): Digital Eel
- Publisher(s): Shrapnel Games
- Platform(s): PlayStation Portable, Mac OS, Windows
- Release: December 24, 2008
- Genre(s): Action

Brainpipe: A Plunge to Unhumanity is an action video game developed by Digital Eel for Microsoft Windows, Mac OS and handhelds and was released on December 24, 2008. The game received "Excellence in Audio" award at Independent Games Festival 2009.

== Reception ==
Reception

Aggregate score
Aggregator	Score
Metacritic	59/100 (PSP)

Review scores
Publication	Score
Eurogamer	5/10 (PSP)
Gamezebo	80/100 (PC)
The Games Machine	80/100 (PSP)

The PlayStation Portable version of BrainPipe received "Mixed or Average" reviews, according to review aggregator Metacritic.

Eurogamer praised the game's "psychedelic" graphics but criticized the game's gameplay, saying that it "isn't particularly satisfying or even all that interesting". Gamezebo expressed that the game's sound and graphics "[create] a lovely psychedelic atmosphere" that is "beautifully realised", and praised its fast-paced gameplay in later levels, stating that "it's surprising just how thrilling BrainPipe really is", but criticized the game's brevity.

The Games Machine called the game "very engaging", and praised its "incredible" visuals and sound.
