= RoboBlitz =

2006 video game

- Developer: Naked Sky Entertainment
- Publisher: Naked Sky Entertainment (PC) Microsoft Game Studios (XBLA)
- Engine: Unreal Engine 3
- Platforms: Microsoft Windows, Xbox 360
- Release: Windows; November 6, 2006; Xbox 360; December 6, 2006
- Genres: Puzzle, action
- Mode: Single player

RoboBlitz is an indie puzzle action video game for Microsoft Windows through Steam and the Xbox 360 through Xbox Live Arcade. The game was developed by Naked Sky Entertainment and released on November 6, 2006. It was the first Unreal Engine 3 game alongside Gears of War to be released.

== Plot ==
Blitz is a technician robot tasked with the maintenance of an orbital space cannon when it comes under attack from NEOD forces. The game does not feature a detailed plot or background. Instead the focus is on task completion with the assistance of another un-named and incapacitated robot similar to Blitz.

== Gameplay ==
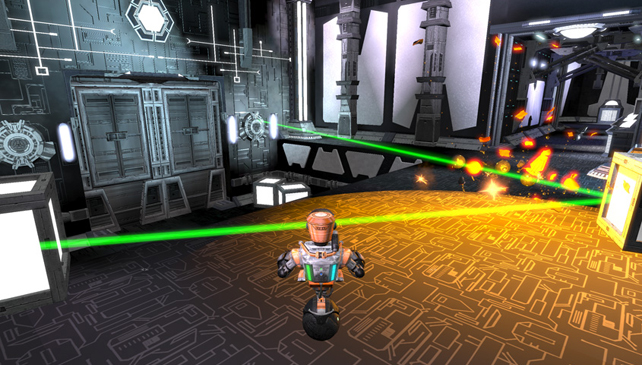
Blitz navigates between lasers in the Security Vault

The player controls a robot who must navigate through six three part sectors to power up an orbital space cannon. Each sector has a multitude of enemies and a singular physics based puzzle per stage, as well as 'upgradium' pickups that can be used to expand Blitz' utilities, movement, and weaponry. Blitz can jump and interact with machines and elevators. It is able to grab objects likes barrels, carry them and use them to crush enemies as well as use weapons to shoot various enemies. Players can choose a more difficult game mode which when completed, gives access to bonus content.

== Development ==
RoboBlitz uses a middleware tool developed by Allegorithmic to store its textures procedurally. This technique is used to make the game file size smaller, the actual game is less than 50 megabytes on Xbox Live.

== Reception ==
Reception

Review score
Publication	Score
Official Xbox Magazine (US)	8.5/10

RoboBlitz was met with critical acclaim and has received several awards and honors. The game was nominated for the 2007 Independent Games Festival for both the Seumas McNally Grand Prize and Excellence in Visual Art awards. The game was the Grand Prize winner for the 2007 Indie Games Showcase, a winner of the GameTap Indie Award, and "Best Digital Download Game of the Year" by Play Magazine.
