= Bang! Howdy =

2006 video game

- Developer: Three Rings Design
- Publisher: Three Rings Design
- Engine: jMonkey Engine
- Platforms: Windows, Linux, Mac OS X, SteamOS
- Release: 2006-12-01
- Genres: Strategy, Western
- Modes: Online single- and multi-player

Bang! Howdy is an online free-to-play, hybrid turn based and real time strategy game created by American company Three Rings Design. It was originally released on December 1, 2006 after public beta testing by Grey Havens, a non-profit organization founded by several former employees of Three Rings. In 2008, the game reached a milestone of 500,000 players as reported on Three Rings' website.

The game mixes different elements from a variety of related genres, namely Western, steampunk, and Native American mythology. This is evident in the game's different locales and various gameplay elements.

At the 2006 Game Developer's Conference, Three Rings described Bang! Howdy's gameplay formula as "Chess + Mario Kart + Real Time/Turn-Based + Steampunk Westerns + Secret Sauce".

== Setting ==
Bang! Howdy incorporates many elements from the Western and steampunk genres, as well as Native American mythology. This is evident in the game's different "towns", player lobbies which also act as the different main settings of the game, outside of in-game instances.

Frontier Town is the game's starting town. It is modelled after the archetypal "Western" town found in most depictions of the genre, complete with a saloon, general store, and sheriff's office.

Indian Trading Post, the second town, is host to a variety of Native American-themed locales, shops, and non-player characters.

In addition to these, there are also the planned but still-unreleased towns of Boom Town, Ghost Town, and City of Gold. Aside from taking inspiration from and expanding on all the aforementioned genres, these last three towns would have also incorporated elements of Latin American folklore

The game also features a host of controllable units which are in-line with the game's established unique setting. For example, several of the players' available units are entirely mechanical, including autonomous artillery units, steam powered dirigibles, and a "steam gunman" robot. These can be played alongside the more conventional units such as cavalry and gunslingers. A third assortment of Native American-themed units can also be unlocked as players progress past the starting town, such as mystics with supernatural abilities and a unit inspired by the Thunderbird, a legendary creature in Native American mythology.

== Development ==
Initially conceived as an insect-themed game, the primary mechanic of Bang! Howdy is designed to get around the problems of both real-time and turn-based strategy. Michael Bayne, project leader of Bang! Howdy, described RTS as "overly complex and too fast-paced", and described turn-based strategy as "no fun when it's not your turn."

Bayne described the development approach as episodic, with the plan of getting the core game released quickly and working on new towns in turn.

The Steam version, which was released in July 2017, is maintained by Affliction Networks.

== Reception ==
Bang! Howdy won the Technical Excellence award from the 2007 Independent Games Festival, and was a finalist for the Seumas McNally Grand Prize. The editors of Computer Games Magazine presented Bang! Howdy with their 2006 "Best MMO Debut" award.

In game websites reviews it was received positively.
