= Crayon Physics Deluxe =

- Steam header
- Developer: Petri Purho
- Designer: Petri Purho
- Composer: Stian Stark
- Engine: Box2D
- Platforms: Windows, iOS, Mac OS X, Linux, Android
- Release: Windows (as Crayon Physics); 2007 iOS; January 5, 2009; Windows; January 7, 2009; OS X August 26, 2011 (Steam); Linux: EU: August 26, 2011; NA: September 9, 2011
- Genre: Puzzle
- Mode: Single-player

Crayon Physics Deluxe is a puzzle video game designed by Petri Purho and released on January 5, 2009. An early version, titled Crayon Physics, was released for Windows in June 2007. Deluxe won the grand prize at the Independent Games Festival in 2008. It features a heavy emphasis on two-dimensional physics simulations, including gravity, mass, kinetic energy and transfer of momentum. The game includes a level editor and enables its players to download and share custom content via an online service.

== Gameplay ==
The objective of each level in Crayon Physics Deluxe is to guide a ball from a predetermined start point so that it touches all of the stars placed on the level. The ball and nearly all objects on the screen are affected by gravity. The player cannot control the ball directly, but rather must influence the ball's movement by drawing physical objects on the screen. Depending on how the object is drawn, it becomes a rigid surface, a pivot point, a wheel or a rope, and the object can then interact with the ball by hitting it, providing a surface to roll on, dragging, carrying or launching the ball, etc. The player can also nudge the ball left or right by clicking on it, and in some levels, rockets appear and can be used as part of the solution.

The game challenges players to come up with creative solutions to each puzzle, and provides additional rewards for elegant solutions that do not rely on "brute force methods". It comes with more than seventy levels, and also features a level editor and an online Playground, where players can upload and download custom levels.

== Development ==
=== Crayon Physics ===
Crayon Physics, the original prototype of this game, is Purho's tenth "rapid-prototype project" inspired by the rules of the Experimental Gameplay Project, and was developed in five days using resources freely available under a Creative Commons license. The game was first released for Windows. On June 10, 2007, Purho announced that he would be developing a level editor to permit user-created levels, although by June 15 fans of the game had already worked out the level format and had released new levels for the game. The level editor was released on June 30. Crayon Physics was built with Simple DirectMedia Layer middle-layer and released as freeware.

=== Crayon Physics Deluxe ===
On October 12, 2007, Purho, also known by his studio alias of 'Kloonigames', announced Crayon Physics Deluxe, which would feature an intuitive level editor, more levels, and a modification to the game engine to preserve the player's drawings instead of turning them into rectangles. The follow-up took a year and eight months to develop. It won the Seumas McNally Grand Prize at the Independent Games Festival in February 2008. Chris Baker of Slate Magazine also wrote that Crayon Physics Deluxe was more talked about than Gears of War 2 at the 2008 Game Developers Conference.

Microsoft Windows, Mac OS X, Linux and Android versions of this game were released along with Humble Indie Bundle for Android 4 on November 8, 2012.

=== Platforms ===
Published by Hudson Soft, Crayon Physics Deluxe was released for the iOS on January 1, 2009 and in Spring 2010 for the iPhone via Apple's App Store. A version for the PC was released six days later. An unofficial clone was made for the DS, but only in free play mode and under the title of Pocket Physics. A port for Windows Mobile was also made, but later pulled. It can still be downloaded unofficially. Ports for Mac and Linux were announced as available on July 27, 2011. Crayon Physics is pre-loaded on some Android devices including the Samsung Galaxy Note 10.1.

== Reception ==
Reception

Aggregate scores
Aggregator	Score	
Aggregator	iOS	PC
GameRankings	75%	77%
Metacritic	N/A	79/100

Review scores
Publication	Score	
Publication	iOS	PC
Destructoid	N/A	8.5/10
Edge	N/A	7/10
Eurogamer	8/10	7/10
GamesTM	N/A	8/10
GameZone	8/10	N/A
IGN	N/A	8.8/10
PC Format	N/A	86%
PC Gamer (UK)	N/A	78%
PC Zone	N/A	71%
The A.V. Club	N/A	B+
The Digital Fix	N/A	7/10

The PC version received "generally favorable reviews" according to the review aggregation website Metacritic.
