= Blueberry Garden =

2009 video game

- Developer: Erik Svedäng
- Publisher: Erik Svedäng
- Platforms: Windows, Linux, OS X
- Release: Windows; June 10, 2009; OS X, Linux; January 24, 2014
- Genre: Puzzle-platform
- Mode: Single-player

Blueberry Garden is a puzzle-platform game developed by Erik Svedäng. It was released on June 10, 2009 for Windows, and on January 24, 2014 for OS X and Linux via Steam. It has a piano soundtrack written by Daduk. It is the winner of Seumas McNally Grand Prize for "Best Independent Game" at the 2009 Independent Games Festival. The game's soundtrack partially inspired that of Minecraft, composed by C418.

== Development ==
When developer Erik Svedang was asked in an interview about the art creation for the game, he replied "The coloring is in Photoshop actually. But the lines are markers on paper."

== Reception ==
Reception

Aggregate score
| Aggregator | Score |
|---|---|
| Metacritic | 68/100 |

Review scores
| Publication | Score |
|---|---|
| Edge | 5/10 |
| GameSpot | 5/10 |
| IGN | 6/10 |
| PC Gamer (UK) | 79% |
| PC Gamer (US) | 86% |
| PC Zone | 68% |
| The A.V. Club | B |

The game received "average" reviews according to the review aggregation website Metacritic. Writing for IGN, Daemon Hatfield rated the game a 6/10, "Okay" on the site. Hatfield felt the game play was boring, but praised the art and music. Kevin VanOrd of GameSpot rated the game 5/10, criticizing the gameplay and saying that the game was not worth the money spent on it.
