= Dr. Blob's Organism =

2003 video game

- Title screen
- Developer: Digital Eel
- Publisher: Cheapass Games
- Designers: Iikka Keränen; Rich Carlson
- Platforms: Windows, Mac OS X
- Release: July 4, 2003 (Win); September 24, 2003 (Mac)
- Genre: Shoot 'em up
- Mode: Single-player

Dr. Blob's Organism is a 2003 video game developed by Digital Eel and published by Cheapass Games for Windows. It was later ported to Mac OS X.

== Gameplay ==
Dr. Blob's Organism is a shoot 'em up based on Conway's Game of Life. The game area is a petri dish and the objective is to shoot the green blob in the center. The dish can be rotated either with the arrow keys or the mouse. If the blob reaches the edge of the dish, a health point is lost, if all five points are lost, the game is over. There are 20 levels, ten power-ups (e.g. freeze, lightning, multiguns), and three difficulty levels.

== Development and release ==
Dr. Blob's Organism was developed by Digital Eel, an independent development group based in the Seattle metropolitan area. The game had a budget of $1000 and development time of three months. It was released on July 4, 2003 for Windows as an online download and also on CD-ROM. A Macintosh port was released on September 24, 2003. On May 7, 2004, the Mac version was included in a CD-ROM compilation with two other Digital Eel games titled Boiler Plate Special. In 2005, the game was included in the Independent Games Festival-sanctioned compilation titled Independent Games, published by Moondance Games for the PC. In 2008, the game was released for free along with other Digital Eel games.

== Reception ==
Reception

Review scores
Publication	Score
Macworld	3.5/5
iDNES.cz	8/10
GameShark	8/10
Game Tunnel	7/10
PC Gameworld	80%
A vos Mac	7/10

Macworld said: "If you're looking for a complicated game you can really immerse yourself in, Dr. Blob's Organism isn't for you. But if brainless arcade fun is more your style, give this game a try." Computer Gaming World wrote: [...] Dr. Blob's Organism is a fun little shooter with a novel twist, some decent music, and a slew of power-ups." Chinese magazine Play called it a quirky and fun shooting game that is easy to play. French magazine A vos Mac called it "a furious parable of John Conway's Game of Life". GameShark concluded: "Ultimately Dr. Blob's Organism is a fun little game that combines a really bizarre topic with an interesting arcade shoot 'em up theme that ends up working very well." Computer Games Magazine called it "a strange combination" of Star Castle, Tempest, and Game of Life. They noted it as a quality little game. PC Gameworld wrote: "If you're looking for something completely mindless, that gives your reflexes a good workout, give Dr. Blob's Organism a whirl. If you're looking for something deeper, look elsewhere." GameSpot called it a "good shooter" that puts the player into a Zen-like trance. iDNES.cz said the mouse is clearly the best choice over keyboard controls. The difficulty was noted as not particularly enjoyable, especially for beginners. Game Tunnel noted the game for its a very high production values compared to other independent games. NBC News called the gameplay addictive but the soundtrack was noted as awful and cheesy.

At the 2004 Independent Games Festival, the game won the "Innovation in Audio" and "Innovation in Visual Art" awards in the "Web/Downloadable" category.
