= Keep Talking and Nobody Explodes =

2015 video game

- Developer: Steel Crate Games
- Publisher: Steel Crate Games
- Designers: Allen Pestaluky; Ben Kane; Brian Fetter
- Programmers: Allen Pestaluky; Ben Kane; Brian Fetter
- Artist: Chris Taylor
- Composer: Liam Sauvé
- Engine: Unity
- Platforms: Android; Microsoft Windows; OS X; PlayStation 4; Linux; Nintendo Switch; Xbox One
- Release: Gear VR; 16 July 2015; Microsoft Windows; 8 October 2015; OS X; 14 December 2015; Oculus Rift; 26 March 2016; PlayStation VR; 13 October 2016; Google Daydream; 10 November 2016; Linux; 19 December 2017; Oculus Go; 1 May 2018; Nintendo Switch, PS4, Xbox One; 16 August 2018; Oculus Quest; 21 May 2019; iOS, Android (non-VR); 1 August 2019
- Genre: Puzzle
- Mode: Multiplayer

Keep Talking and Nobody Explodes is a puzzle video game developed and published by Canadian studio Steel Crate Games. The game tasks a player with disarming procedurally generated bombs with the assistance of other players who are reading a manual containing instructions. It was designed around virtual reality support, with availability first on Android-driven Samsung Gear VR, with later ports to supported devices on Microsoft Windows, OS X, PlayStation 4, and Linux; though could be played without virtual reality in some cases. An update for the game released in August 2018 removed the virtual reality requirement for these existing systems, as well as included releases for the Nintendo Switch and Xbox One. Non-VR ports for iOS and Android were released in August 2019.

== Gameplay ==
The game is designed to be played with at least two players, with one player as the "Defuser", playing the game on a device (supporting both keyboard and mouse, touchscreen and gamepad controls, as well as support for virtual reality headsets), and the remaining players as the "Experts" reading the provided bomb defusal manual. As designed, the Defuser cannot look at the manual and must rely on the Experts to instruct them; similarly, the Experts cannot see the bomb, and must rely on the Defuser to describe the bomb to them. The Experts and the Defuser can communicate with each other either directly from across a table, or online using a separate voice service.

Each bomb in the game consists of multiple modules; the modules are independent of each other and can be disarmed in any order. Most modules require disarming, with the bomb successfully defused when all such modules are successfully disarmed. Disarming these modules requires the Defuser to relay visual indicators to the Experts, who then use the manual to determine what actions the Defuser should take. Other modules are "needy": they cannot be disarmed, and demand periodic attention to prevent them from causing a strike while the bomb is still armed. Each bomb will also have a countdown timer; if the timer reaches zero, the bomb will explode. Bombs will also have a maximum number of strikes resulting from errors made during defusing (also speeding the timer), and if that maximum is reached, the bomb will also explode. Other obstacles to the Defuser include the lights in the virtual room going out momentarily, and alarm clocks that will distract the Defuser.

Modules use complex instruction sets and puzzle-like elements to be solved, and the defusing instructions are generally conditional on the configuration of the particular module; for example, the Experts may need to guide the Defuser through a maze whose walls the Defuser cannot see, but as the manual has maps for a number of mazes, the Defuser must help the Expert identify which map is currently applicable for that given module. Some modules deliberately make verbal communication complicated: some use unusual glyphs that require description, other modules use words that may be homophones of other similar words ("sees" to "seas"), verbal tics ("uhhh" or "uh huh") or common words that would be otherwise used in that situation ("press" or "left") that could easily be confused during communication between Defuser and Experts. Many modules have multiple stages that require the Experts to keep track of past actions as they work through each stage. Defusing some modules may also depend on the state of the bomb such as how many strikes it presently has, or external decorations on the bomb like the serial number or the presence of batteries.

The game is broken up into a number of predetermined levels broken up into skill groupings that set the number and types of modules, the time to defuse the bomb, and the maximum number of strikes. Each level will generate the bomb and its modules to be defused in a procedural manner. Players also can create a custom challenge based on module count, time, and strikes.

== Development ==
Developers Allen Pestaluky, Ben Kane, and Brian Fetter originally created the game for Global Game Jam 2014. There, they had a few Oculus Rift development kits and wanted to take advantage of the novelty of virtual reality. Their original game, a rollercoaster ride simulator, had attracted a number of people to try it out, but the three observed that while the wearer of the headset was enjoying themselves, those waiting for their turn did not share that enjoyment. This gave them the idea of a game that could be shared alike by both a headset wearer and those watching the wearer. Though they had several scenarios in mind, the idea of bomb defusing was the most interesting as well as something they could complete during the Game Jam. At the end of the Game Jam, they presented their game to the other participating developers, recording their own first playthrough of the game which they later posted to YouTube; the response both at the Game Jam and from YouTube viewers, calling the game "hilarious", led the three to realize they were on to a marketable title and developed the game for a full release. In developing the various rules for disarming modules, these were initially created procedurally like the bombs themselves, so that they could be shifted around between various demonstrations at trade shows; though the final game has statically defined rules for defusing, there is a framework in place that can be used to mix up the rules in future versions.

A PlayStation VR version of the game was released on 13 October 2016, while a version for the Android-based Google Daydream virtual reality platform was released on 10 November 2016. Steel Crate released a non-VR version for the PlayStation 4, Nintendo Switch, and Xbox One on 16 August 2018; this was a free update for existing owners of the game. Ports for iOS and Android devices without VR support were released on 1 August 2019.

== Reception ==
Reception

Aggregate score
Aggregator	Score
Metacritic	(NS) 84/100 (PC) 71/100 (PS4) 88/100

Review score
Publication	Score
Destructoid	9/10

The PC version of Keep Talking and Nobody Explodes received "mixed or average" reviews while the Nintendo Switch and PlayStation 4 versions received "generally favorable reviews", according to review aggregator platform Metacritic.

Destructoid awarded it a score of 9 out of 10, saying "If you are tired of always playing Cards Against Humanity, Monopoly, and that Gargoyles board game on Laserdisc, then Keep Talking and Nobody Explodes will certainly give you the fix you're looking for, pending you have friends ready to be committed to the task at hand."

Ars Technica's Sam Machkovech reviewed the game, calling it a "must-have", although he also noted that once players figure out certain modules, they can "hit a chore-like rhythm" instead of a challenge. He also observed the game's potential as a party game that is equally enjoyable for onlookers.

At the 2015 National Academy of Video Game Trade Reviewers (NAVGTR) awards Keep Talking and Nobody Explodes won Game, Strategy. The game also won the Excellence in Design award, and was nominated for the Seumas McNally Grand Prize and the Nuovo (Innovation) Award at the 2016 Independent Games Festival. Steel Crate Games was nominated for the Best Debut for the game for the 2016 Game Developers Choice Awards, and the 2016 British Academy Games Awards. The Official UK PlayStation Magazine listed it as the third best PS VR game.

By March 2016, the game had sold more than 200,000 copies.
