= Eclipsium =

2025 horror game

- Developer: Housefire
- Publisher: Critical Reflex
- Composer: Hudson Bikichky
- Platform: Microsoft Windows
- Release: 19 September 2025
- Genre: Horror
- Mode: Single-player

Eclipsium is a 2025 surrealist horror game developed by Housefire Games and published by Critical Reflex.

== Gameplay ==
Eclipsium is a first-person horror game in which the player explores surreal environments while making their way towards a distant tower with a prominent floating heart. It features bizarre symbolic imagery and a string of horror concepts incorporating elements of surrealist, cosmic, and body horror.

Described as a walking simulator, its gameplay primarily derives from following a linear path through a series of different areas, although there are some simple puzzles included throughout the game. As they progress, the player character sacrifices various parts of their body to attain special powers in their hands; these are often used to solve the game's puzzles or to interact with the environment.

== Development and release ==
Eclipsium was developed by Gothenburg, Sweden-based studio Housefire Games and published by Critical Reflex. A demo was released in 2024 followed by an updated demo on 28 August 2025 to coincide with the announcement of the full game's release date. The full game was released for Steam on 19 September 2025.

== Reception ==
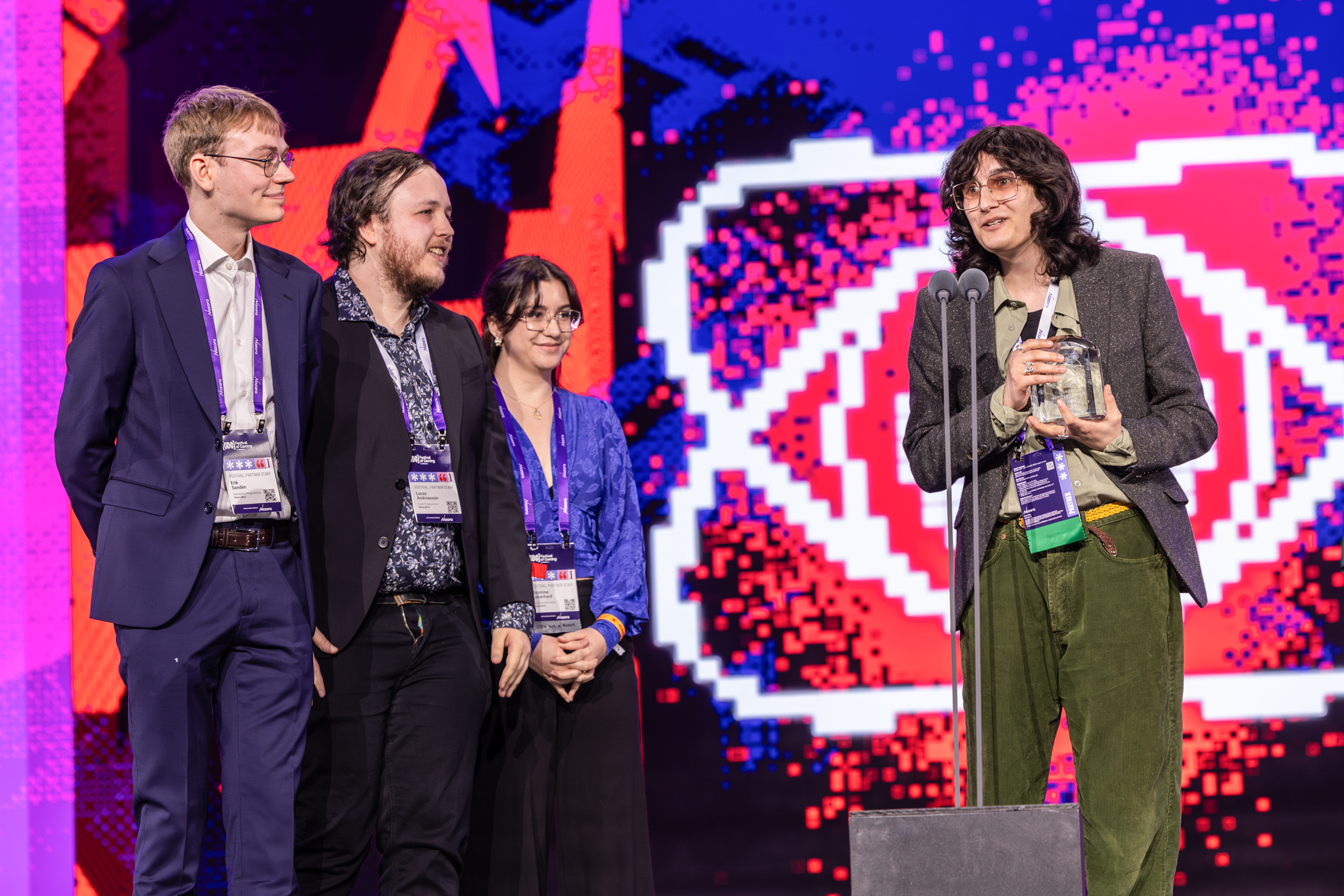
Eclipsium won the Excellence in Visual Art award at the 2026 Independent Games Festival

Eclipsium received "generally favorable" reviews according to review aggregator website Metacritic, based on 4 critic reviews.

It received praise for its pixelated, PlayStation 1-inspired art style and scenery. John Walker, writing for Kotaku, said the game had "truly beautiful vistas", with pixels pulsating across the environment to create an "organic feeling of breathing" that he found "extraordinary". Em Stonham and Sam Smith from The Escapist called the graphics "stunning", and although they found the intensity could cause eye strain, they felt there were adequate graphics settings available to help address this. Elijah Gonzalez of Endless Mode thought the art style resulted in "hazy, impressionistic sights" that were almost Lynchian in their ability to symbolise different things to different people. Edwin Evans-Thirlwell from Rock Paper Shotgun also praised the focus on symbolism and enjoyed that the animations of the player character's hands felt expressive.

Many reviewers described the game as having a strong atmosphere or "vibe". Gonzalez called the game "vibe-oriented" and felt it particularly succeeded in this respect during its horror-focused segments, but he found some other areas were uninteresting or superficial. Joshua Wolens of PC Gamer said the game was "pure vibes" and effectively created a "sense that the world you inhabit is fundamentally wrong". Stonham and Smith found that its horror did not come from "cheap frights", but from "a looming feeling of dread". Harold Goldberg of The New York Times thought the game worked best as a "psychedelic invasive species of the mind" and felt that it successfully evoked "a grim, fraught hell".

Some reviewers found the slow walk speed tedious, including Maxim Ivanov from IXBT Games. Gonzalez found that this problem was exacerbated by the inconsistency of the game's puzzles, some of which he found to be "lackluster" or "a real chore". Gonzalez also felt that the narrative of the game was not compelling and its ending was not satisfying. Stonham and Smith, by contrast, thought the game had a "subtly-woven story" and Goldberg found the ending optimistic.

=== Year-end lists ===
Publication	Accolade	Rank	Ref.
Kotaku	John Walker's Top 10 Games Of 2025	10	
