= Wild Earth (video game) =

2006 video game

- Developer: Super X Studios
- Publishers: RU: Akella (PC); NA: Ubisoft (PC); EU: Empire Interactive (PC); WW: Majesco (Wii)
- Platforms: Microsoft Windows, motion simulation rides, Wii
- Release: Online: FRA: March 17, 2006; NA: April 24, 2006; Windows: FRA: March 16, 2006; RU: September 18, 2006; NA: November 16, 2006; EU: April 5, 2007; Wii: NA: April 22, 2008; EU: September 12, 2008; AU: November 27, 2008
- Genre: Motion simulator
- Mode: Single-player

Wild Earth is a safari video game and motion simulator ride by Super X Studios. The player photographs 30 types of animals as a photojournalist in Serengeti National Park. Released in 2006, it was first released as an online video game in France on March 17, and in North America on April 24. Akella published the game for Microsoft Windows as Safari Photo Africa: Wild Earth on September 18, and Ubisoft published it as Wild Earth: Photo Safari in November, while Empire Interactive published it under their Xplosiv banner as Wild Earth: Africa on April 5, 2007. Majesco later published a Wii version, Wild Earth: African Safari, in 2008. The game was also installed as a motion simulator ride in multiple American zoos. It won several awards including the grand prize at the 2003 Independent Games Festival.

== Gameplay ==
Screenshot of gameplay

Wild Earth is a safari video game in which players explore and photograph African safari environments. The player acts as a photojournalist in Serengeti National Park and is set to photograph 30 different types of animals, from hyenas to rhinoceroses. In the Wii version, the controller rumbles when the player strays too close to the animals, which affects the camera's steadiness. The game was also installed as a motion simulation ride at zoos including the Philadelphia Zoo, Zoo Miami, and San Diego Zoo.

== Development ==
Super X Studios, an indie developer based in Seattle, built Wild Earth for release on Microsoft Windows and supposedly Xbox, before the latter version was later canceled in 2005 or early 2006. The team won the game design innovation, visual art innovation, and grand prize at the Independent Games Festival in 2003. They had previously worked on Far Gate, which won the audience award at the same festival in 2000. By December 2005, Wild Earth's production was complete but Super X ended its agreement with British publisher Digital Jesters when the latter was being restructured. The game was released as an online video game in 2006. Russian game developer Akella published the game for release on September 18, while Ubisoft published the game on November 16. A later agreement with Discovery Channel and Animal Planet brought the game to Europe, where it was published by Xplosiv on April 5, 2007. In 2008, Majesco published Wii version titled Wild Earth: African Safari.

The game was re-released on Steam as Wild Earth - Africa in March 2022.

== Reception ==
Reception

Aggregate score
Aggregator	Score	
Aggregator	PC	Wii
Metacritic	72/100	60/100

Review scores
Publication	Score	
Publication	PC	Wii
Eurogamer	5/10	N/A
Game Informer	N/A	5.75/10
Gamekult	6/10	N/A
GameZone	7.8/10	5/10
IGN	N/A	5/10
Jeuxvideo.com	13/20	12/20
PC Format	71%	N/A
PC Gamer (UK)	79%	N/A
PC Zone	64%	N/A
VideoGamer.com	7/10	N/A
USA Today	N/A	8/10

The game received "mixed or average reviews" on both platforms according to the review aggregation website Metacritic.
