= Dyadin =

Dyadin Дядин
- Khutor
- Location within Voronezh Oblast Location within Russia
- Coordinates: 49°50′N 40°31′E
- Country: Russia
- Region: Voronezh Oblast
- District: Bogucharsky District
- Time zone: UTC+3:00

Dyadin (Russian: Дядин) is a rural locality (a khutor) in Radchenskoye Rural Settlement, Bogucharsky District, Voronezh Oblast, Russia. The population was 333 as of 2010. There are 8 streets.

== Geography ==
Dyadin is located on the Levaya Bogucharka River, 17 km south of Boguchar (the district's administrative centre) by road. Radchenskoye is the nearest rural locality.
