= Far Gate =

2000 video game

- U.S. cover art
- Developer: Super X Studios / Thrushwave Technology
- Publisher: Microïds
- Platform: Windows
- Release: EU: December 2000; NA: September 11, 2001
- Genre: Real-time strategy
- Modes: Single-player, multiplayer

Far Gate is a video game released for Microsoft Windows. It was developed by Super X Studios (formerly Thrushwave Technology) and published by Microïds. The gameplay consists of 3D space-based real-time strategy, and allows players to play as any of three distinct factions employing different units and structures. It was one of the first video games to offer fully 3D space-based real time strategy.

Under the title of The Rift, an early version of Far Gate was the winner of the Audience Choice Award at the 2000 Independent Games Festival. Despite this initial acclaim, however, its eventual retail release suffered from unfortunate timing issues and received mixed critical reviews.

== Plot ==
Far Gate takes place in the year 2104 AD where Earth has been left an apocalyptic ruin following a devastating World War III. The player takes the role of Jacob Viscero, a "Han Solo-esque" black marketeer, who is blackmailed into assisting with the human colonization of the Proxima Centauri star system. The colonization process is complicated by untrustworthy allies, and by attacks from the Nue-Guyen, a squid-like alien race native to the vacuum of space who are able to travel from system to system via means of wormholes.

Battles against the Nue-Guyen take place across a range of planetary systems, until it is revealed that the Nue-Guyen had mistaken the player's faction for the crystalline Entrodii race. The player now allies with the Nue-Guyen to fight the Entrodii, culminating in an attack on an Entrodii fortress at Cygnus X-1. An epilogue reveals the Nue-Guyen assisting in the colonization of Proxima Centauri.

== Gameplay ==
The game's single-player campaign takes place over 17 missions and follows Jacob Viscero's struggles against the Nue-Guyen and the Entrodii. It uses a real time strategy format with the player producing units and structures, which are then used to defeat enemy forces. Unlike many other real time strategy games, Far Gate does not make use of a technology tree to determine which units a player may build, but instead makes new units available based on which mission of the storyline the player has reached.

Gameplay is set in space and therefore makes use of three dimensions, although the majority of the game's action focuses on a two-dimensional plane. The three factions (Terrans, Nue-Guyen and Entrodii) each have their own units and structures, which in turn have unique strengths and weaknesses. In addition, each of the factions approaches combat differently, with the Nue-Guyen literally swimming through space, and the Entrodii splitting and fracturing into discrete battle units as they enter combat. In the single player campaign, the player may only utilize the Terran units, although in multiplayer matches players can select any of the three factions to control.

The computer-controlled enemies are driven in part by a rudimentary artificial intelligence, but mostly by a series of scripted commands and triggers. A player who is experienced in any given mission can exploit the predictable nature of the mission script to achieve a quick victory. New players, by contrast, may be frustrated by enemies who don't appear to play by rules similar to those imposed on the player.

The game's story is told by cutscenes rendered in the game engine, which are overlaid with anime-style character shots and voice overs. Some of these cutscenes run up to five minutes in length. The cutscenes cannot be skipped by the player and must be watched in full on each playthrough. The game can also be played in a competitive multiplayer mode over the internet, supporting 2-4 players, with matchmaking provided by the GameSpy and Mplayer services. The game shipped with six multiplayer maps included. A campaign editor was included in Far Gate, allowing players to create and script their own missions and campaigns.

== Development ==
Far Gate began life in 1999 under the title The Rift, developed by a four-man team at Thrushwave Technology headed by James Thrush. The team included Dustin Wood (Test Lead, 3D Artist), Jeff House (3D Artist) and Chris Overstreet (Music and Sound Design). The Rift was notable for its large space-based battlefields, where solar systems remained in motion as battles progressed.

The Rift won the Audience Choice Award at the 2000 Independent Games Festival. Subsequently, it was renamed Far Gate and developed for full retail release with Microids attached as a publisher (Microids having been attracted to the project by its IGF success), and in September 2000 Thrushwave Technology changed its name to Super X Studios. By the time the game was finished, the development team had grown to a size of 10 people, still headed by James Thrush. Super X Studios developed an entirely new game engine for Far Gate. After Far Gate was released, this engine code was refined and rebranded as the Super X Engine, and used in other games by Super X Studios.

== Release ==
The retail version of Far Gate was scheduled for release for PC on September 11, 2001. However it did not reach many stores until later that week. The developers acknowledged that it was unfortunate that the release date coincided with the September 11 attacks. In a September 11 press release Super X Studio stated that as developers they "have an opportunity to use our unique story-telling medium to promote ideals of education, humanity and global cooperation, just as the mediums of art, poetry, books, and movies have been used by wise and compassionate individuals in the past." In the United States Far Gate's recommended retail price was set at US$29.99. A free playable demo was also made available for download from the site of developer Super X Studios, which featured two single player missions and a self-running demo mode.

== Reception ==
Reception

Aggregate score
Aggregator	Score
Metacritic	66%

Review scores
Publication	Score
GameSpot	6.3/10
GameSpy	74/100
GameZone	5.5/10
IGN	8/10

Award
Publication	Award
Independent Games Festival 2000	Audience Choice Award

Early builds of Far Gate met with general excitement and anticipation. A pre-release version of Far Gate (then titled The Rift) won the Audience Choice Award at the 2000 Independent Games Festival. However, the final release version of Far Gate received mixed reviews by critics. As of October 2009, it held a 66% score on review aggregator Metacritic, based on nine reviews.

Brett Todd of GameSpot felt that "extended gameplay uncovers a great many shortcomings in its [interface]" and that it exhibits a "lack of technical polish" - load times are "extremely long" and "the game regularly crashes". By contrast however, "the story is well told", and Todd was impressed by the "three distinct playable factions in the game that employ wholly disparate units and structures".

Dan Adams of IGN also thought that "the controls are a little iffy" and the AI is "sketchy", but despite that felt that "the interface [...] is actually pretty easy to use". He described the game's music as like a "horrible 80s sci-fi flick" and thought it "didn't convey the right kind of atmosphere". He said that despite "some problems with the game", "it still holds a bit of interest".

Louis Bedigian of GameZone thought the gameplay was "both a joy and a royal pain", describing the unfettered camera control as "both the best (and worst) feature in the game". Although he enjoyed "the illusion that you have complete control over your surroundings", he said, "Dying has never been a fun part of gaming, and dying because of a poor camera system and not a lack of skill is even worse." He thought the on screen control panels were "very impressive" but was critical of the game's slow pace and felt the developers had "chosen realism over fun".

=== Comparison to Homeworld ===
As one of the first fully three-dimensional real time strategy games, Far Gate was often compared to its contemporary, Homeworld. During development there was some speculation that Far Gate (then The Rift) would beat Homeworld to retail and thereby be the first game of its kind. However Homeworld ended up being released a full two years ahead of Far Gate, on September 28, 1999. In the end many critics felt that Far Gate compared poorly to Homeworld and did not live up to the standard that Homeworld had established for the new subgenre of 3D space-based real time strategy. Gaming news site IGN described Far Gate' as "a kind of wanna-be Homeworld" and "Homeworld Light".
