= Wide Ocean, Big Jacket =

Wide Ocean Big Jacket
- Developer: Turnfollow
- Publisher: Tender Claws
- Platforms: PC, Nintendo Switch
- Release: 2020
- Genre: Adventure game
- Mode: Single-player

Wide Ocean, Big Jacket is an indie adventure video game released for PC and the Nintendo Switch in 2020. It was developed by Turnfollow and published by Tender Claws.

== Overview ==
The game follows middle school student Mord and her boyfriend Ben on a weekend camping trip with Mord's aunt Cloanne and uncle Brad. Players switch between each character as they play the game. Gameplay consists of interactive dialogue options and point and click gameplay.

== Reception ==
Reception

Aggregate score
| Aggregator | Score |
|---|---|
| Metacritic | 79/100 |

Review score
| Publication | Score |
|---|---|
| Destructoid | 8/10 |

The game's writing, gameplay and aesthetics were praised, although its short length and price were criticized. Michael Moore of The Verge particularly praised the interactivity of the game's dialogue system and choices. Jordan Devore of Destructoid gave the game a positive review, describing it as "a good-natured adventure game that’s less about interacting with stuff and more about absorbing the atmosphere".

Steven Scaife of Slant Magazine wrote that "the game suggests so much beyond itself, through the lyrical cadence of the dialogue, the charming specificity it brings to the characters’ lives, and the way it cuts out of dialogue to reveal scenes". A review from Switch Player praised its graphics, soundtrack, writing, and atmosphere.

Jamie Latour of TheGamer gave it 3.5 out of 5 stars, criticizing the short campaign while comparing the "simple character designs, primary colors, and blocky, polygonal backgrounds" to Frog Detective 2: The Case of the Invisible Wizard.
