= Kung-Fu Chess =

Real-time chess variant developed by Shizmoo Games

Kung-Fu Chess is a chess variant that removes the concept of turns and allows multiple pieces to move simultaneously. It was created by Shizmoo Games as a "real-time" in the early 2000s and remained on the company's website until the website shut down in 2008. Other online servers have since appeared. It won an award in the 2002 Independent Games Festival.

== Background ==
The game was conceptualized in the early 2000s by Dan Goldstein as a "real-time" version of chess; it was later developed by him and his brother Joshua Goldstein under the name "Ultra Speed Chess". The name was later changed to "Kung-Fu Chess" to reflect the martial-arts themed sound effects that would play during the players' moves. The game was published by Shizmoo Games on the company's website, and it won the Audience Choice award in the 2002 Independent Games Festival. Following with the martial arts theme, the game also featured a rating system categorized by belt colors. It was later supplemented with additional variants (such as Four-player chess, Crazyhouse, and Bughouse chess) before the website shut down in 2008.

The original version was added to the ICQ instant messaging program in 2005.

The app Chezz is based on Kung-Fu Chess, adding concepts such as an adventure mode that allows for upgrading pieces to allow them to move more often.

== Rules ==
A typical Kung-Fu Chess opening

Position: d8 black rook, f8 black rook, a7 black pawn, c7 black queen, d7 black bishop, e7 black knight, f7 black king, g7 black bishop, b6 black pawn, c6 black knight, d6 black pawn, e6 black pawn, f6 black pawn, h6 black pawn, c5 black pawn, g5 black pawn, c4 white pawn, f4 white pawn, b3 white pawn, d3 white pawn, e3 white pawn, f3 white knight, g3 white pawn, a2 white pawn, b2 white bishop, c2 white queen, d2 white knight, g2 white bishop, h2 white pawn, c1 white king, d1 white rook, f1 white rook

Opening from 2007 Masters Cup semifinals. This position could be achieved, depending on the players' personal speed, before the delay of the first moved piece is ended. The player who gets to capture first on the right-hand side (White's f4 or Black's g5 pawn) is determined by who moved first, since the delay is equally long for both players.

In Kung-Fu Chess, either player can move any available piece at any given moment, though only one piece can be moved at a time. After a piece is moved, a predefined delay prevents it from moving again for a short period of time. This, plus piece movements not being instantaneous, means that speed and timing are crucial aspects of the game, as any delay could determine whether a piece is captured or not.

In addition to this, the game's "real-time" aspect leads to essential differences between Kung-Fu Chess and standard chess. For instance, checks and pins do not exist in the game, since players are not bound to one move at a time and thus could respond to threats with multiple piece movements. Checkmate and stalemate were similarly both impossible to achieve; as such, the game only ended when one's king was physically captured or if one's opponent resigned.
