= Wik and the Fable of Souls =

2004 video game

- Developer: Reflexive Entertainment
- Publisher: Reflexive Entertainment
- Platforms: Microsoft Windows; Xbox 360 (XBLA); Net Jet
- Release: Windows; September 14, 2004; XBLA: EU: December 2, 2005; NA: December 14, 2005
- Genre: Platform game
- Mode: Single-player

Wik and the Fable of Souls, also known in the Xbox 360 version as Wik: The Fable of Souls, is a platform video game developed by Reflexive Entertainment. The main character, Wik uses a combination of jumping and his long, grapple-like tongue to navigate the world. Accompanying Wik on his journey is a mule-like creature named Slotham. On each level the player must capture a set number of grubs and deliver them to Slotham, but getting the grubs to Slotham becomes more and more challenging through each chapter. There are various bugs that try to steal the grubs or directly harm Wik, and on some levels Wik can fall off the platforms into the abyss. Each level includes three gems; a ruby, an emerald, and a diamond, finding all of these throughout the course of the game is required in order to achieve the best ending.

The game is divided into 16 level sets of 8 levels each (or, on the Xbox 360 version, over 120 levels total). The game features a challenge mode which involves practicing acrobatics and other tricks used during normal game play.

Wik and the Fable of Souls won the Seumas McNally Grand Prize in the downloadable games section at the 2005 Independent Games Festival, and also made an appearance as one of the Xbox Live Arcade games on the Xbox 360. It was made available on Xbox Live Arcade Unplugged Vol. 1. The PC version of the game was made available for Steam in May 2007. In 2010, it was removed from Steam, but can be obtained via Amazon.com.

== Reception ==
Reception

Aggregate score
Aggregator	Score	
Aggregator	PC	Xbox 360
Metacritic	88/100	77/100

Review scores
Publication	Score	
Publication	PC	Xbox 360
Eurogamer	N/A	8/10
GameSpot	9/10	7.5/10
IGN	N/A	7.8/10
Official Xbox Magazine (US)	N/A	8/10
PC Format	80%	N/A
TeamXbox	N/A	8/10

Wik and the Fable of Souls received "generally favorable reviews" on both platforms according to the review aggregation website Metacritic. PC Format gave it a favorable review over two years after the PC version was released. During the 9th Annual Interactive Achievement Awards, Wik and the Fable of Souls was awarded "Downloadable Game of the Year" by the Academy of Interactive Arts & Sciences.
