= Blaseball =

Online browser video game

- Developer: The Game Band
- Designers: Sam Rosenthal; Joel Clark; Stephen Bell
- Platform: Browser
- Release: July 20, 2020
- Genres: Simulation, horror
- Mode: Multiplayer

Blaseball was a baseball simulation horror game developed by The Game Band. It was active from July 20, 2020, to June 2, 2023, and was played via web browser. During each week the game was active, a full season and championship series of "Internet League Blaseball" was simulated, with elections on Sundays in which the community changed the rules of the game. Non-player characters, such as the league's owner or commissioner, occasionally delivered dialogue on the website and through Twitter accounts, creating an absurdist horror narrative.

The game has an active fandom known for their prolific fan works. There was a high degree of audience participation, with the game's developers actively engaging with the fan community online.

== Gameplay ==
Blaseball centered on an absurdist simulation of baseball, with fictional teams, featuring random events such as the "incineration" of players by "rogue umpires". Each player had a name and a star rating, which was used to determine their stats, as well as amusing trivia such as their preferred coffee type and their pre-game rituals. After their first log-in, users would choose a favorite team and be given some coins. The game allowed users to use these coins to bet on the outcomes of the simulated games. Fans could also "idol" players and earn coins based on their performance. Each season lasted a week, and users were able to follow what happened in real time. The matches were organized every day on the hour, while the post-season happened in two parts, with wild card matches and quarterfinals happening on Friday and semifinals and finals happening on Saturday. Users were able to use their coins to purchase votes, which were used to vote on events and rule changes that will happen after each season on Sunday.

Narratively, the story of Blaseball unfolded across eras spanning multiple seasons, and was significantly impacted by players' collective choices through elections. These eras included the Discipline Era, marked by the league banding against a giant malevolent peanut known as The Shelled One, and the Expansion Era, featuring a coin dubbed only as The Boss who wished to add increasingly complex rules to the sport. The Coronation Era was the last era prior to the game's cancellation.

On July 30, 2021, as the Expansion Era ended, Blaseball became unplayable due to a black hole consuming the league. Starting October 28, 2022, a weekly event occurred announcing one random returning player falling from the black hole to each team leading up to the return of Blaseball. On January 9, 2023, the game resumed with a clean slate, featuring the same teams but with entirely new rosters consisting of both new and returning players. Due to mixed feedback to the new experience, The Game Band opted to place the game back on a brief hiatus on February 3, 2023, to address concerns before resuming play. The Game Band would provide periodic status updates and tease new features during this time before ultimately announcing the decision to end Blaseball on June 2, 2023.

As of the game's closure, there were 24 teams:

- Atlantis Georgias
- Baltimore Crabs
- Boston Flowers
- Broken Ridge Jazz Hands (formerly Breckenridge)
- Canada Moist Talkers
- Charleston Shoe Thieves
- Chicago Firefighters
- Core Mechanics
- Dallas Steaks
- Hades Tigers
- Hawaiʻi Fridays
- Houston Spies
- Kansas City Breath Mints
- LA Unlimited Tacos
- Mexico City Wild Wings
- Miami Dale
- Hellmouth Sunbeams (formerly Moab)
- New York Millennials
- Ohio Worms
- Philly Pies
- San Francisco Lovers
- Seattle Garages
- Tokyo Lift
- Yellowstone Magic

== Development ==
Sam Rosenthal, the creative director of The Game Band, spent some time on video conference calls during a quarantine caused by the COVID-19 pandemic with friends who do not usually play video games, but were still eager to play browser adaptations of board games. The idea of creating a title that would bring people together attracted the developers. At first, he thought to make a horse-racing gambling game, but the team decided that the whole concept was better suited for baseball.

From August 9, 2020, to August 24, 2020, The Game Band put the game on a temporary hiatus, citing the problems associated with running into unexpected viral popularity. Blaseball was put on another hiatus, referred to as a "Grand Siesta", from October 25, 2020, to March 1, 2021.

The Expansion Era ended in July 2021, and Blaseball went into a lengthy siesta, allowing the Game Band to work on overhauling the game. On November 1, 2021, it was announced that Blaseball would return for a shorter format season, called Blaseball: Short Circuits, for the purpose of testing out quality of life improvements and new features. On October 26, 2022, The Game Band announced that Blaseball would be returning with a prologue, beginning on October 28, 2022. The Game Band also announced a mobile version of Blaseball would be released around the same time.

On June 2, 2023, The Game Band announced the cancellation of the Coronation Era along with the simultaneous ending of Blaseball. The Game Band cited the cost needed to run the game as being too high to support.

== Fanbase and community ==
Blaseball is known for its sizeable fan community, which has developed a deep lore around the game and its teams. Fans have also contributed by creating art and social media accounts for Blaseball players, leagues, sportscasters and union representatives. The Blaseball community often uses its platform to engage in charity and activism, including charitable donations through the collectively-run merchandise store Blaseball Cares, campaigning for Nithya Raman for LA council, and running a series of Industrial Workers of the World union training courses.

== Awards ==
Blaseball was a 2021 finalist for the Nebula Award for Best Game Writing. It was also nominated for Best Video Game at the 2021 Hugo Awards.

In July 2021, Blaseball won the Nuovo Award at the 2021 Independent Games Festival.

== Bibliography ==
- Lee, Julia (October 4, 2020). "An introductory guide to Blaseball". Polygon.
- McKinney, Kelsey (March 3, 2021). "Inside Blaseball". Defector.
