= RPG Time: The Legend of Wright =

2022 video game

- Steam header art
- Developer: DeskWorks
- Publisher: Aniplex
- Platforms: Windows; Xbox One; Xbox Series X/S; Nintendo Switch; PlayStation 4
- Release: Windows, Xbox One, Xbox Series X/S; March 10, 2022; Switch, PlayStation 4; August 18, 2022
- Genres: Adventure, role-playing
- Mode: Single-player

RPG Time: The Legend of Wright (Note: Japanese: ＲＰＧタイム！～ライトの伝説～, Hepburn: RPG Taimu ! Raito no Densetsu) is a 2022 adventure video game developed by DeskWorks and published by Aniplex. Described as a "handwritten role-playing game", the visuals of RPG Time are depicted as a hand-drawn series of paper-and-pencil games on a notebook presented to the player as a role-playing adventure. Development of the game was led by Japanese designer Tom Fuji, who had worked on the game for over ten years, and cited his childhood experiences with hand-made games from craft materials as the inspiration for the game's visual design and theme.

The game received mixed reviews from critics, with reviewers praising the visual presentation and charm of the game, but criticizing the execution of its varied gameplay elements. It received several awards and nominations, including for 'Excellence in Visual Arts' at the Independent Games Festival in March 2023.

== Gameplay ==
A screenshot of gameplay in RPG Time

RPG Time invites the player to play the hand-made games of Kenta, a young and aspiring game designer who uses drawings, cardboard and stationery to create a role-playing game of his own imagination. Through an assimilation of comic strips, panels and animations, Kenta creates a story in which the player is Wright, a warrior in the land of Cardboardaria who must battle the forces of darkness to save Princess Lay, the princess of the Land of Light, who has been kidnapped by the Demon King Deathgawd.

Whilst RPG Time is marketed as a role-playing video game, the game's chapters differ enormously in terms of their gameplay and content, changing game mechanics and input methods. In most chapters, the player navigates the protagonist Wright through hand-illustrated scenes across different environments. A consistent mechanic is a battle system in which the player is required to use a combination of different input styles and strategies to defeat monsters they encounter throughout the game. At times, the player uses stationery interact with the drawn environment, such as using pencils to guide the player character or an eraser to remove obstacles.

== Development ==
RPG Time was the debut game of Japanese studio DeskWorks, a team directed by Tom Fuji, who coordinated most aspects of the game's design and planning. Fuji was a Japanese developer who had previously worked in the game development industry as a level designer and editor for fifteen years, and had conceived the game's concept during this time, with the game being developed over a ten-year period.

The inspiration of the game arose from Fuji's childhood experiences, including using cardboard boxes as a child to create "maps and interfaces for a computer game", playing with a friend in elementary school who created hand-crafted games, and the animated cartoon presentation of children's television shows from Fuji's childhood, such as Ugo Ugo Lhuga. The decision to pursue a drawn, hand-made aesthetic was also pursued as Fuji and the development team were level designers that lacked experience with graphic design. In some cases, the development team recreated handcrafted versions of certain game elements to ensure the game resembled the behaviour of materials in real life.

== Release ==
The game was announced during Microsoft's E3 2019 showcase on June 9, 2019. It was set to release in 2020 for Xbox One, PC, Android, and iOS, but was later delayed. In September 2021, Aniplex released a new trailer, revealing that they will handle the worldwide publishing of the game. The mobile versions, although playable during previous hands-on events, were removed from the list of platforms.

In February 2022, it was announced that RPG Time: The Legend of Wright will be released for Xbox One, Xbox Series X/S and Windows via Microsoft Store on March 10, 2022. A Nintendo Switch port was announced during the Nintendo Direct Mini in June 2022, and was released alongside the PlayStation 4 port on August 18, 2022. The Windows version was released via Steam on September 13, 2022. Aniplex released a Nintendo Switch physical edition in Japan on October 13, 2022.

A free story update, titled 'Monster Party', was released for all versions on August 8, 2023.

== Reception ==
Reception

Aggregate score
Aggregator	Score
Metacritic	79/100 (XSX); 74/100 (NS)

Review scores
Publication	Score
Computer Games Magazine	8/10
Nintendo Life	7/10 stars
TouchArcade	4/5 stars

RPG Time received "generally favorable" reviews on Xbox Series X and "mixed or average reviews" on Nintendo Switch, according to review aggregator platform Metacritic, with an average score of 79% across 4 reviews and 74% across 10 reviews, respectively.

The game received praise from critics for its visual presentation. Writing for Computer Games Magazine, David Walters praised the game's design as "meticulously designed" and "animated charmingly", writing that "the designers did a superb job of incorporating mixed media and giving each material the right character." Kara Phillips of Nintendo Life concurred that "the unique hand-drawn appearance of this game is easily its main appeal", writing "the visuals are enough to keep you engaged on their own, but every innovative use of an item beautifully represents the developer's creativity." Arthur Damian for The Escapist praised the game for its "little touches", noting "how much thought" was put into the game. Mikhail Madnani of Touch Arcade also praised the "animation work and aesthetic" of the game, whilst noting the "definite visual downgrades and image quality" of the Nintendo Switch version of the game.

Critics were divided on the design and execution of RPG Times's gameplay mechanics. Writing for Nintendo Life, Kara Phillips wrote "while the gameplay isn't breaking new ground, enough passion and personality have been added (to) stop things from becoming repetitive or stagnant", highlighting the inclusion of "charming minigames" and boss battles. However, David Walters of Computer Games Magazine stated that the gameplay "can feel somewhat sluggish", citing the "less than stellar input delay (and) overzealous hitbox". Describing the game as "all over the place", Matthew Pollesel of Gaming Age wrote that the game "never stays on one topic long enough", although noting the game is "overflowing with ideas".

=== Accolades ===
RPG Time won several awards and nominations over the period of its development. The game won an award for 'Excellence in Visual Arts' at the Independent Games Festival in March 2023. In 2019, the game received the best of show Vermilion Gate Award at BitSummit, held by the Japan Independent Game Association. RPG Time was also inducted as a nominee for awards at IndieCade 2019.
