= Crime Cities =

2000 video game

- Developer(s): Techland
- Publisher(s): EU: Techland; NA: EON Digital Entertainment
- Designer(s): Andrew Beard; Eugeniusz Debski; Paweł Marchewka; Bartlomiej Paul
- Composer(s): Pawel Blaszczak
- Platform(s): Windows
- Release: EU: December 1, 2000; NA: January 15, 2001
- Genre(s): Action
- Mode(s): Single-player, multiplayer

Crime Cities is a video game for Microsoft Windows. Developed and published by Techland and EON Digital Entertainment in 2000-2001 (and later by Big City Games and Gathering of Developers), Crime Cities is an action game that incorporates some limited elements of auto racing.

== Reception ==
Reception

Aggregate score
Aggregator	Score
Metacritic	71/100

Review scores
Publication	Score
GameSpot	5.9/10
GameZone	7.5/10
IGN	8.1/10

The game received "average" reviews according to the review aggregation website Metacritic.
