= TypeRacer =

Web video game

- L
- Website type: Multiplayer online game
- Founder: Alex Epshteyn
- Website: play.typeracer.com
- Commercial: Yes
- Registration: Free
- Launched: March 2008
- Current status: Online

TypeRacer is a multiplayer online browser-based typing game. In TypeRacer, players complete typing tests of various texts as fast as possible, competing against themselves or with other users online. It was launched in March 2008.

== History ==
TypeRacer was created by programmer Alex Epshteyn, using the OpenSocial application programming interface (API) and the Google Web Toolkit. Epshteyn is a former intern at Google and graduate of the University of Massachusetts Amherst with a Master's degree in computer science. He was inspired to create a competitive multiplayer typing game because the Windows shareware program he used to learn touch typing lacked a multiplayer mode. Although older games, such as The Typing of the Dead, had launched before Epshteyn's conception of TypeRacer, the existence of such were unbeknownst to him due to his self-described inexperience in the gaming community. When a former engineer from the hallmark typing game Mavis Beacon Teaches Typing contacted Epshteyn regarding TypeRacer, he expressed approval for the project on behalf of the Beacon team.

TypeRacer was listed among PC Magazine's "Top 100 Undiscovered Web Sites of 2008".

== Gameplay ==
A screenshot from the end-game results of one race, illustrating the wpm, time and score.

Players compete by racing miniature cars that advance as the users type various passages. The passages range in lengths from approximately 20 to 930 characters. For racing, there is the default ("maintrack") option, where players race against each other by typing randomly selected quotes from a database. Practice racing, or "ghosting", is the game's single-player option where players can type any text on demand, and save up to ten races per day. Players can save more races by upgrading their subscription tier. In addition, there are separate competitions and private tracks. In competitions, the player with the most points by a certain time wins. In private tracks, players need a customized link to access the track. When typing text selections, 100 percent accuracy is required; any typing errors detected in spelling, capitalization or punctuation must be fixed by the player before continuing with the race. Accuracy is determined not from the amount of incorrect or extra letters at the end of a race, but the ratio of incorrect or extra letters to correct ones. The typing passages are popular culture references and come from songs, films, television shows, video games and books. For example, text selections include passages from such sources as Monty Python and the Holy Grail, A Clockwork Orange, and Stephen Colbert's I Am America (And So Can You!). Additional quotes can be submitted by users to be considered for addition into the game.

When racing, the words per minute (wpm) speed recorded from a given user are compiled and used to generate metrics like a player's all-time average and their last ten averages. Based on a player's average, players are categorized into one of six skill levels:

Rank	WPM
Beginner	0 – 24
Intermediate	25 – 30
Average	31 – 41
Pro	42 – 54
Typemaster	55 – 79
Megaracer	≥ 80

TypeRacer restricts the use of cheats with measures such as keystroke replays and a captcha anticheat that requires users who achieve over 110 wpm in a race to complete a CAPTCHA. When completed successfully, if high-scoring players achieve a score that is 25% higher than their recorded CAPTCHA speed, an additional challenge-response test will be reactivated.

After a player completes a race, five metrics measure the user's performance: registered wpm, unlagged wpm, accuracy, points, and rank. Registered wpm is how fast the website has calculated a player's speed average throughout the text. It is measured in a way that prevents cheaters from manually sending scores to the website, which means there is often lag that lowers a player's wpm count. The unlagged wpm is a player's actual speed. Players can view it by watching a replay of their race. A player's accuracy is the percentage of the characters entered correctly in the text. A player's points is an alternate way of measuring how well a person did in a race. The better a player performs, the more points that player gets. Text length is weighed in heavily in point calculation; the formula for it is Total points = (# of words typed) * (net wpm / 60). These results are also used in competitions to determine the winner. A player's rank is equivalent to their place in the race. Whoever completes the race fastest takes first place.

There are many "universes" in TypeRacer. These are branches of the main site dedicated to a specific aspect of typing. For example, there is a "Numbers Universe" where the texts are exclusively numbers, and there is a "Long Texts Universe", where all of the texts are extremely long.

On the website, various statistics about a user can be shown. These include the user's last 10 races, average speed of all time, last race speed, best race speed of all time, number of races, number of races won, points, skill level, speed percentile (compared to other players), and experience level, corresponding to the number of races completed.
