= Kewala's Typing Adventure =

1996 video game

- Cover art of 1997 Typequick for Students re-release
- Developer: Typequick
- Publishers: Typequick; Japan Data Pacific (Japan)
- Directors: Noel McIntosh; James Richardson (creative); Donna McIntosh (technical)
- Programmer: Ross Mitchell
- Artists: Joe Wylie; Robert Smit
- Platforms: Windows, macOS
- Release: 1996
- Genre: Edutainment

Kewala's Typing Adventure (Note: Japanese: キワラのタイピングアドベンチャー) is a 1996 Australian educational typing-themed video game, featuring a koala protagonist named Kewala. It was developed by Sydney-based software company Typequick, and localised by Japan Data Pacific for the Japanese market. The game was renamed Typequick for Students in 1997 and, by 2002, was called Success With Typing for Students.

The game sees the player follow the true blue (authentically Australian) koala protagonist Kewala on an adventure through Australian landscapes to the magical Kingdom of Eaz, learning how to type through tutorials on where to place fingers and touch-typing practice through sentences that advance Kewala's movements.

The game has received a positive reception from critics. Consistent praise was given to how the game's educational qualities were masked behind a highly entertaining adventure, as well as the rare showcase of local Australian landmarks. Additionally, the game has received various awards including the Software Product of the Year in the Social/Life skills category at Japan's 1997 SOFTIC Award ceremony.

== Premise and gameplay ==
The game features a 10 to 15-hour interactive adventure about a true blue (authentically Australian) koala named Kewala as he treks through Australia on an emu, then surfs with whales to the magical Kingdom of Eaz, as the player masters their typing skills. The game records the player's progress and typing speed and will return them to the next lesson upon re-entering. The game begins with a tutorial on where to place fingers, and then with nonsense words like "assa" and "saas", with players soon progressing to complete sentences. The CD-ROM came with a hardcover binder with details of each typing lesson for teachers. The game emphasizes the importance of posture and finger positioning for typing. According to Typequick, the game helps children with dyslexia and other special needs overcome writing difficulties.

== Development ==
Kewala's Typing Adventure gameplay

Prior to this game's release, Sydney-based software company Typequick had been a successful Australian software company for 15 years; its software was widely used across Australian universities, TAFEs and schools and was the biggest selling typing program in Japan. Founded by Noel McIntosh in 1982, the company had sold $25 million worth of typing programs, with over half its gross profits from overseas sales, by 1997. The Australian Financial Review reported in 1990 that the United States Department of Defense had bought 1600 copies of the original title, while the company would win the 1992 CODiE Award for Best Special Needs Program for another title, Talking TypeQuick for the Blind.

Kewala's Typing Adventure was designed for 11 to 25 year olds. It was written in the Borland C++ integrated development environment and includes 64 background scenes, 2500 animated images, and 20 talking characters. While the product was at the higher end of the pricing scale, Typequick assessed that retailers like Harvey Norman would funnel in-store promotion toward the product as it was good quality, locally supported (by a manufacturer-distributor with in-depth knowledge of the product), and could offer the retailer a higher profit margin. 'Kewala' was registered as a trademark on January 3, 1997, for a "computer software used for keyboard training, and instruction manual therefore, sold together as a unit".

While the game was originally called Kewala's Typing Adventure, Typequick identified that the product sales were below expectations so hired a design agency and conducted market research which discovered the original packaging looked "too gamey". The agency was tasked with designing a package that was appealing to parents, teachers, and students and came up with Typequick for Students. The 1997 re-release came with a multi-user license for schools. By 2002, the title was also called Success With Typing for Students. Typequick brought its original package to Japan and localised it in 1986, in 1994 Japan Data Pacific signed a contract to become the domestic distributor of Typequick games, including Kewala's Typing Adventure which was also localised into Japanese.

== Reception ==
The Age felt the title was "full of clever tricks and cool sounds to hold the attention" of its young players, and that the "program's technique creeps up on you quietly". In a separate article, the newspaper noted the program's strange technique of teaching players to use two spaces after a full-stop (the default setting). The Sydney Morning Herald thought the "skills are cleverly integrated into an amusing trek around Australia", and that it played as "an adventure story with music, animation and games". The newspaper later wrote that "youngsters get to play a complete, highly entertaining adventure game and, along the way, end up competent typists". Supporting Children with Motor Co-ordination Difficulties felt the game's structured lessons "motivate pupils to learn to touch type".

Typequick for Students won the Software Information Centre Japanese Top Education Course of 1997 award, and additionally awarded Software Product of the Year in the Social/Life skills category at Japan's 1997 SOFTIC Award ceremony as the best software product in circulation in Japan throughout the year.

Within three months of its release, Typequick's saw its sales double; the company noted that sales of Typequick Classic was at a 1 to 1 ratio with the new product. Typequick's website asserts that Kewala's Typing Adventure annually teach over 250,000 students how to touch-type. In December that year, it was voted into the finalist review programs of the 1998 SPA (USA) Excellence in Software Awards for the Best Home Education Product for Teenagers and Adults. It was voted PC User Magazine's #1 product two years in a row at Australian Macworld.
