= Your Computer =

Your Computer may refer to:

- Your Computer (Australian magazine), a monthly computer magazine, 1981–1997
- Your Computer (British magazine), a monthly computer magazine, 1981–1988
