= Dead Letter Dept. =

Dead Letter Dept. may refer to:

- Dead Letter Dept. (band), a Canadian punk band
- Dead Letter Dept. (video game), a 2025 video game
