= Glyphica: Typing Survival =

2024 indie rogue-like shooter typing game

- Developer: aliasBLACK
- Publisher: Squeaky Wheel
- Engine: neoSphere
- Platforms: Windows; Linux
- Release: 9 October 2024
- Genre: Typing
- Mode: Single-player

Glyphica: Typing Survival is a hybrid minimalist typing game that is a rogue-like, bullet hell shooter and survival video game developed by Singaporean indie game studio aliasBlack, and published by Squeaky Wheel. It has been called a Soulslike by some of the gaming community members. It was released on Steam on October 9, 2024.

== Gameplay ==
In Glyphica, the player controls a turret that fires at waves of enemies approaching the middle of the screen, and also features boss battles. The player shoots down enemies using various unlockable and upgradable weapons by typing the words on top of each enemy using the keyboard, or pressing the buttons indicated above each enemy if playing with a game controller.

The speed and accuracy of the player's typing grants effects that are advantageous in battle, such as increased critical hit rates.

Rogue-like elements include randomized loot, upgrades, and weapons.

The gameplay is also similar to tower defense games.

== Development ==
Initially launched on Windows, Glyphica also runs on Linux via Proton. It supports multiple languages, also with its wordlists. It was developed using neoSphere, a JavaScript game engine. A browser-based demo was released on October 22, 2025 at its official website.

== Reception ==
Glyphica has been compared to Vampire Survivors, as a "Survivor-like, bullet-heaven horde-game" by GamingOnLinux.

Former reviews editor Ed Thorn at Rock Paper Shotgun said that Glyphica is a "simple thing that trains your typing skills in a way that seems well-balanced and clean". Thorn also said that it also reminded him of a game he'd play in school, which automatically granted it an automatic "Yeah, this is the good sh*t" bonus. It was nominated for the Southeast Asian Indie Game Award at The Indie Game Awards in 2025.

== See also ==
- Mavis Beacon Teaches Typing
