= Mavis Beacon (character) =

Fictional character created for the Mavis Beacon Teaches Typing software

- Mavis Beacon Teaches Typing character
- First appearance: 1987
- Portrayed by: Renée L'Espérance (1987)

In-universe information
- Occupation: Typing instructor

Mavis Beacon is a fictional character created for the Mavis Beacon Teaches Typing line of computer software.

== History ==
Developed to be a personification of a The Software Toolworks instructional typing program, Mavis Beacon debuted as simply a photo of a model on the software's packaging in 1987. The model chosen to be the face of Mavis was Haitian-born Renée L'Espérance, who was discovered working behind the perfume counter at Saks Fifth Avenue Beverly Hills by former talk-show host and partner at The Software Toolworks Les Crane in 1985. Mavis's name comes from a combination of Mavis Staples (one of the software developer's favorite singers) and the word beacon (an allusion to her role as a guide to typing).

There have been several models chosen to represent the confident efficiency of Mavis Beacon; her image changes to represent a "modern professional typing instructor."

According to an opinion article in The New York Times, author J.D. Biersdorfer opined, "Due to Mavis Beacon being portrayed by a black woman, some retailers were initially reluctant to display the product. However, once the popularity of the program became evident, many distributors reversed their decision and began to display the line of software bearing Mavis Beacon's image."

Since its introduction, Mavis Beacon Teaches Typing has been the best-selling instructional typing software.

== Fame ==
Mavis Beacon has been seen as groundbreaking for being one of the first computer instruction characters and for being a black female embodiment of computer software. Throughout the 1990s, Mavis Beacon served as the virtual typing instructor at numerous U.S. schools. As of 1998, she had instructed 6,000,000 school children. Mavis has been compared to U.S. cultural icon Betty Crocker and has been called "the Betty Crocker of cyberspace".

=== Confusion ===
Mavis Beacon is often thought to be a living or historical figure by the public. This confusion has led many to contact the software developers seeking to speak to, interview, or book Mavis for an event. Furthermore, as a result of Mavis Beacon's continuous use in computer typing software, and her image on millions of software boxes, many consumers have reported confabulations (i.e. false memories) of Mavis Beacon winning typing contests or appearing on talk shows.

== See also ==
- Seeking Mavis Beacon (2024 documentary film about Mavis Beacon)
- Typequick
