= Akupara Games =

American video game publisher

- Logo (2021)
- Type: Private
- Industry: Video games
- Founded: October 5, 2016; 9 years ago
- Founder: David Logan
- Headquarters: Los Angeles, California, US
- Area served: Worldwide
- Key people: David Logan (CEO)
- Website: www.akuparagames.com

Akupara Games is an American video game publisher and developer. Based in Los Angeles, California, the company was founded in 2016 by David Logan. The company also does contracting work for development and porting to console and mobile platforms.

== History ==
After the production of Logan's first title as a developer, Whispering Willows, Logan and his team moved into post-launch support.

Akupara developed the game Hello Cruel World, a VR title released for the Meta Quest 2, Meta Quest 3, and Windows in August 2024.

== Works ==
Year	Title	Platform(s)	Developer(s)	Notes	Ref.
2017	Star Vikings Forever	Android, iOS, macOS, Microsoft Windows	Rogue Snail		
2017	The Metronomicon: Slay the Dance Floor	macOS, Microsoft Windows, PlayStation 4, Xbox One	Puuba, Akupara Games	Co-developed	
2018	Keep in Mind: Remastered	Android, iOS, macOS, Microsoft Windows	Little Moth Studios, Akupara Games	Co-developed	
2018	Chicken Assassin: Reloaded	Nintendo Switch, PlayStation 4	OneShark	Ported	
2018	Whispering Willows	Nintendo Switch	Night Light Interactive	Ported	
2018	Desert Child	macOS, Microsoft Windows, Nintendo Switch, PlayStation 4, Xbox One	Oscar Brittain	Ported	
2019	Mutazione	Android, Atari VCS, iOS, macOS, Microsoft Windows, PlayStation 4, Nintendo Switch, Xbox One	Die Gute Fabrik	Ported	
2019	Etherborn	Microsoft Windows, Nintendo Switch, PlayStation 4, Xbox One	Altered Matter		
2020	The Darkside Detective	Android, Atari VCS, iOS, macOS, Microsoft Windows, Nintendo Switch, PlayStation 4, PlayStation 5, Xbox One, Xbox Series X/S, Google Stadia	Spooky Doorway	Ported	
2020	Relic Hunters Zero: Remix	Nintendo Switch	Rogue Snail	Ported	
2020	Spinch	macOS, Microsoft Windows, Nintendo Switch	Queen Bee Games	Ported	
2020	Gone Viral	Microsoft Windows	Skullbot Games		
2021	The Crow's Eye	Microsoft Windows	3D2 Entertainment		
2021	The Darkside Detective: A Fumble in the Dark	Atari VCS, macOS, Microsoft Windows, Nintendo Switch, PlayStation 4, PlayStation 5, Xbox One, Xbox Series X/S, Google Stadia	Spooky Doorway	Ported	
2021	GRIME	Microsoft Windows, Google Stadia, Nintendo Switch, PlayStation 4, PlayStation 5, Xbox One, Xbox Series X/S	Clover Bite	Ported	
2021	Behind the Frame: The Finest Scenery	Microsoft Windows, Android, iOS, Nintendo Switch, PlayStation 4	Silver Lining Studio	Ported	
2022	Absolute Tactics: Daughters of Mercy	Microsoft Windows, Nintendo Switch	Curious Fate		
2022	Kardboard Kings	Microsoft Windows, Nintendo Switch	Henry's House, Oscar Brittian, Rob Gross	Co-Developed, Ported	
2023	Rain World: Downpour	Microsoft Windows, Nintendo Switch, PlayStation 4, PlayStation 5, Xbox One, Xbox Series X/S	Videocult	Co-Developed, Ported	
2023	Zoeti	Android, iOS, Microsoft Windows, Nintendo Switch	Dusklight Games		
2023	Astrea: Six-Sided Oracles	Android, iOS, Microsoft Windows, Nintendo Switch, PlayStation 4, PlayStation 5, Xbox One, Xbox Series X/S	Little Leo Games		
2023	Universe For Sale	Android, iOS, Microsoft Windows, Nintendo Switch, PlayStation 4, PlayStation 5, Xbox One, Xbox Series X/S	Tmesis Studio		
2024	Cryptmaster	Microsoft Windows, PlayStation 4, PlayStation 5, Xbox One, Xbox Series X/S	Paul Hart, Lee Williams	Co-Developed	
2024	Everafter Falls	Microsoft Windows, Xbox One, Xbox Series X/S, PlayStation 4, PlayStation 5, Nintendo Switch	SquareHusky	Ported	
2024	Hello Cruel World	Meta Quest 2, Meta Quest 3, Microsoft Windows	Akupara Games		
2024	Ynglet	Nintendo Switch, PlayStation 4, PlayStation 5	Nifflas	Published along with new content for all platforms	
2024	Sorry We're Closed	Microsoft Windows, Nintendo Switch, PlayStation 4, PlayStation 5, Xbox One, Xbox Series X/S	à la mode games		
2025	Cabernet	Microsoft Windows, Nintendo Switch, PlayStation 4, Xbox One	Party for Introverts		
2025	Repose	Microsoft Windows	Bozó Attila Bertold		
2025	Nanomon Virtual Pet	Linux, macOS, Microsoft Windows	Oscar Brittain		
2025	Gigasword	Microsoft Windows, Nintendo Switch, PlayStation 4, PlayStation 5, Xbox One, Xbox Series X/S	Studio Hybrid		
2026	Dead Pets	macOS, Microsoft Windows	Triple Topping		
2026	Kumitantei: Old-School Slaughter	Microsoft Windows	Mango Factory		
2026	Montabi	Microsoft Windows, Nintendo Switch, Nintendo Switch 2, Xbox One, Xbox Series X/S	Mankibo		
2026	The Immortal John Triptych	Microsoft Windows, Nintendo Switch, Nintendo Switch 2, PlayStation 5, Xbox One, Xbox Series X/S	Joe Richardson		
2026	Echo Weaver	Microsoft Windows, Nintendo Switch 2, PlayStation 5, Xbox One, Xbox Series X/S	Moonlight Kids		
2026	Airframe Ultra	Microsoft Windows	Videocult		
2027	The Darkside Detective: Backside of the Moon	Microsoft Windows	Spooky Doorway		
2027	Aokaki	Microsoft Windows	Concha Indigo	Co-published with Kallisti Games sublabel	
TBA	Future Vibe Check	Microsoft Windows	Unwise		
TBA	Bracer	Microsoft Windows	Curious Fate		
TBA	Bonespire	Microsoft Windows	Paul Hart, Lee Williams	Co-developed	
