= The Textorcist: The Story of Ray Bibbia =

2019 bullet hell and typing video game

- Developer: Morbidware
- Publisher: Headup Games
- Programmer: Diego Sacchetti
- Writer: Matteo Corradini
- Platforms: Windows, macOS
- Release: February 14, 2019
- Genres: Bullet hell, typing
- Mode: Single-player

The Textorcist: The Story of Ray Bibbia is a hybrid bullet hell and typing video game developed by Italian studio Morbidware and published by Headup Games. It was released on February 14, 2019, for Windows on the Steam client. The game revolves around an ex-priest who is also a freelance exorcist. The game received mostly positive reviews, praising its music, theme and graphics.

== Plot ==
The game's main character is Ray Bibbia, a "salty" ex-priest living in Rome who takes house calls to exorcise demons. Ray Bibbia first receives a call about a vomiting possessed girl. After a skirmish, Ray successfully exorcises her, he then brings her to his house after the girl's master refuses to pay Ray for his services or take care of the girl, soon after revealed to be called Magda. At the same time, Ray discovers that the Holy Church still facilitates slavery, with him trying find Magda's friend to help her, though he is clearly distressed upon seeing a picture of Magda with her friend. After crashing a metal vegan band concert and a strip club for information, Ray uses his computer follow up on a clue he was previously given to find a certain Holy Church covenant. Upon investigating the covenant, Ray finds evidence of their involvement with the trading of slave from blood to human bones to medieval weapons. The Nun, who had been passing off evidence as merely circumstantial, finally attacks Ray, but he is able to exorcise her. He enters a secret dungeon to find the girl he has been looking for, and is revealed to be her father. When they try to escape, one of the Holy Church's Lieutenant, now a Demon, stops them and defeats Ray while taking the girl with him back to the Vatican. Enoch, the singer from the metal vegan band, saves the unconscious Ray, who realized he isn't powerful enough and is urged by Magda to seek out his old master for further training. His master is revealed to be a Hermit in Naples, but it was revealed that his master also made a deal with the demons and became a demon himself. With him revealing that only a demon can destroy a demon, while Ray has only been exorcising them and nothing more.

== Gameplay ==
The holy invocations of the main character are displayed as text on screen the player must type in the manner of a typing game. However, while they are typing, they must also dodge projectiles ranging from vomit to energy beams. If the player is hit, they drop their Bible and take damage to their health.

== Reception ==
Reception

Aggregate score
Aggregator	Score
Metacritic	78/100

Review score
Publication	Score
Eurogamer	8/10

The Textorcist received an aggregate score of 78/100 from Metacritic. Holly Green of Paste Magazine compared the game to Mavis Beacon, calling it "a nice change of pace" as it challenged her despite her typing skill due to its difficulty and emphasis on precision. She called the game's mix of genres "inventive", and the plot and setting "deliciously sacrilegious". Luca Forte of Eurogamer Italia rated the game 8/10, calling the game a tribute to Italy, as well as "ironic" and "irreverent". Saying that the game's music is "extremely catchy", he also called the humor a "godsend" for Italians. However, he stated that the game was "niche" due to its difficulty and gameplay. Simone Tagliaferri of Multiplayer.it rated the game 7.8/10, comparing it to a mix of bullet hell, JRPG and Typing of the Dead, and calling the story "intriguing" despite being "decidedly surreal". Praising the game's pixel art and originality, the reviewer nevertheless stated that the game was "frustrating" if the player could not type blindly with one hand.
