= Saltsea Chronicles =

- Developer: Die Gute Fabrik
- Publisher: Die Gute Fabrik
- Director: Hannah Nicklin
- Composer: Eli Rainsberry
- Engine: Unity
- Platforms: macOS; Windows; Nintendo Switch; PlayStation 5
- Release: October 12, 2023
- Genre: Adventure
- Mode: Single-player

Saltsea Chronicles is an adventure video game developed and published by Die Gute Fabrik. Set in a flooded, post-apocalyptic world, the game tasks players to control an ensemble cast of characters who must navigate an archipelago to rescue their missing captain. The game was released for Windows PC, macOS, Nintendo Switch and PlayStation 5 on October 12, 2023.

== Gameplay ==
Saltsea Chronicles is an adventure game set in a flooded, post-apocalyptic world. The player, controlling an ensemble cast of characters, must sail to islands and investigate the mystery behind their captain's disappearance. The game is divided into 12 chapters, with the player exploring an island in each chapter. In each chapter, the player must bring a designated character, and select a secondary crewmate to accompany them. Each island has their own unique culture and characteristics. As players progress in the game, they will need to make various decisions (often binary) that may influence the narrative of the game. After completing a chapter, the player will return to the ship, where they can choose their next destination. The game features a branching save system that allows players to make alternate decisions. A story log is included to help players recall events happening in the game. Players also need to keep track of each crew member's demands and requests as well as their relationships with fellow crewmates. The game also features an optional card game named Spoils.

== Development ==
The game was developed by Die Gute Fabrik, the studio behind Mutazione. Development of the game began in January 2020, and lasted till October 2023. The team envisioned the game as a "ensemble cast-driven game". Crew members in the game are not considered to be party members. According to creative lead Hannah Nicklin, players are discouraged from role-playing and making decisions based on a character's morals and experiences. Each character in the game represents a unique community, and the game wanted to "explore how individuals shape communities, as well as how individuals are shaped by communities in turn". Each individual's relationship with other characters and their community changes as the player made various decisions. This ultimately became "issues" that players can choose to resolve. The board game The Quiet Year significantly influenced the team's approach to designing the game's narrative. A mood system was initially planned, though this was scrapped as the team believed that it prompted players to game the system. Nicklin added that each chapter is structured like an episode in Avatar: The Last Airbender, in which players are required to move the story forward while taking time to help the local community. Nicklin concluded that the game ultimately was not a story about a hero, and instead "a story about a community", and how they "navigate the world together". The game only has one ending, but players can "shape how and what the characters experience along the way".

The studio compared the premise of the game to Star Trek: The Next Generation, in which players can freely select the destinations for the crew and influence the story. The team created a writers' room for the game. Each chapter is likened to an episode in a television show that utilizes the "villain of the week" format. The game explores various social issues, such as climate change. To accompany the game's release, the studio recruited AfterClimate, a company dedicated to assisting companies to reach their climate goals, and games researcher Dr. Ben Abraham to publish a report on the studio's carbon footprint throughout the span of the game's development. While each island is distinct, they have a shared identity. According to writer Harry Josephine Giles, the team "wanted Saltsea to feel interconnected, where each island is distinct but bound to the others". As distinct culture converges, the team also wanted to explore the theme of traditions and how a community grapples with changes. The Scottish archipelago Orkney served as an important influence for the team. The art style of the game was inspired by risograph print techniques.

In March 2022, publisher Private Division announced that it had partnered with Die Gute Fabrik for an adventure game. While Private Division funded the game's development, Saltsea Chronicles was self-published by Die Gute Fabrik. The game was officially announced in June 2023. A demo for the game was released in the same month. The game was released for Windows PC, macOS, PlayStation 5 and Nintendo Switch on October 12, 2023.

== Reception ==
Reception

Aggregate score
Aggregator	Score
Metacritic	(PC) 84/100 (PS5) 78/100 (Switch) 78/100

Review scores
Publication	Score
Eurogamer	5/5 stars
Push Square	7/10
The Guardian	4/5 stars

Saltsea Chronicles released "generally positive reviews" upon release, according to review aggregator Metacritic.

Christian Donlan from Eurogamer gave the game a perfect score, describing it as "evocative". He enjoyed the choices featured in the game for making each player's experience unique, and liked how the game framed decisions as small, "instinctive" choices which ultimately can generate unforeseen impacts. Heather Wald from GamesRadar praised the characters in the game, describing them as "real and relatable", and liked how the game handled the "issues" system, which accurately portrayed disagreements when individuals with distinct ideals and personality are required to collaborate together. Sarah Maria Griffin from The Guardian strongly praised the game and concluded her review by writing that it helped push "the medium of the narrative game to new horizons". She praised the game's diverse cast of characters and the unique culture of each island.

Writing for Polygon, Ana Diaz described the game as an "incredibly thoughtful and ambitious narrative experience". While she liked the game's exploration of various real-life social issues and wrote that there were many provocative moments, she felt that some themes were underdeveloped due to the game's episodic structure. Rock, Paper, Shotgun's Katharine Castle was disappointed by the game's singular ending, the journey reaching the ending was "richly drawn and full of life" and concluded that the story was "beautifully written". However, she felt the game had more in common with a visual novel, due to the game's lack of puzzles commonly found in adventure games. Ben Lyons from Gamereactor disliked the pacing, deeming it too slow and tiresome. While he liked the game's visual, he described Saltsea Chronicles as a "very hands-off game that features a lot of reading", and that the lack of compelling gameplay elements meant that players may quickly lose interest. He concluded his review by writing that the game did not "have the same immersive qualities" commonly found in other adventure games in the market. Stephen Tailby from Push Square wrote that the game was a "pleasant, ship-shape adventure". While he wrote that the story was "intruiging" and "well-written", he noticed infrequent text errors and felt that the game was very text-heavy in nature.
