= Cabernet =

Cabernet can refer to several different things:

== Wine grape varieties ==
- Cabernet Sauvignon, a hybrid of Cabernet Franc and Sauvignon blanc, one of the most popular wine grapes in the world
- Cabernet Franc, a parent of Cabernet Sauvignon and most often blended with it, but also used for varietals
- Cabernet Gros, a parent of Carménère
- Cabernet blanc, a German/Swiss hybrid of Cabernet Sauvignon and another unknown grape variety
- Cabernet Dorsa, a 1971 hybrid of Cabernet Sauvignon and Dornfelder, created in Germany
- Cabernet Gernischt, a Chinese variety similar or perhaps identical to Cabernet Sauvignon
- Cabernet Mitos, a 1970 hybrid of Cabernet Sauvignon and Blaufränkisch, created in Germany
- Ruby Cabernet, a cross between Cabernet Sauvignon and Carignan, created in California
- Béquignol noir, a French wine grape that has Cabernet as a synonym

== Other uses ==
- Cabernet, a recurring enemy character in the anime Tegami Bachi
- Cabernet (video game), a 2025 video game published by Akupara Games
