= Sorry We're Closed =

2024 video game

- Developer: À la Mode Games
- Publisher: Akupara Games
- Director: C. Bedford
- Designers: C. Bedford; Tom Bedford
- Programmer: Tom Bedford
- Artist: C. Bedford
- Writers: C. Bedford; Tom Bedford
- Composers: C. Bedford; Okumura Music Group; Catton Arthur
- Engine: Unity
- Platforms: Windows; PlayStation 4; PlayStation 5; Xbox One; Xbox Series X/S; Nintendo Switch
- Release: Windows; November 14, 2024; PS4, PS5, XB1, XSX/S, NS; March 6, 2025
- Genre: Survival horror
- Mode: Single-player

Sorry We're Closed is a 2024 survival horror video game developed by À la Mode Games and published by Akupara Games for Microsoft Windows. Versions for PlayStation 4, PlayStation 5, Xbox One, Xbox Series X/S and Nintendo Switch were released in March 2025.

== Gameplay ==
Sorry We're Closed is a single-player survival horror game with multiple endings. The game is split into three phases. At the beginning of each night, the player can explore the city, speaking to other characters and choosing whether or not to help them. Each night also contains a combat stage, which requires killing demons, solving puzzles, and completing a boss fight. While exploring the combat stage, the game is played from a third-person fixed camera perspective, switching to an immobile first-person perspective when the player aims a weapon, which include an axe, pistol, and shotgun. The player character can also utilize a Third Eye, which momentarily stuns and reveals the weak spots of enemies within a short distance, but also negates any damage not done to weak points. Hitting combos on the weak points charges up the Heartbreaker, a special weapon that is crucial to defeating bosses and can kill standard enemies in one shot. In addition to its utility in combat, using the Third Eye is also key to several puzzles.

== Plot ==
Michelle, a young woman who works in a convenience store in London, struggles to move on after her ex-girlfriend, Leslie, broke up with her three years ago. Michelle has a nightmare of a demon who empathizes with her difficulties in love and proposes that she devote herself to them instead. Michelle awakens, only to find herself in another nightmare, chased by a bird-like demon named Dream Eater until she wakes up.

The next night, Michelle's friend Robyn notices a scar on her forehead and informs her that she has been cursed by a powerful archdemon called the Duchess; if she does not come to love them in three days' time, she will meet her end. Robyn, also a demon, shows Michelle how to open her newly acquired Third Eye, with which she can see into the past and the demon world. In an abandoned London Underground station, Michelle is able to see the last moments of a previous victim of the Duchess's, a millionaire named Jenny who ultimately transformed into a monstrous rat. Rat Jenny eats Robyn, but Michelle manages to kill her.

Exiting the tube station, Michelle finds herself in the Duchess's hotel, which hosts demons and houses the Duchess's victims, but manages to leave and get to the abandoned church, where the angel Benedict, Robyn's boyfriend, guards the gates of Hell. She discovers that Robyn survived Rat Jenny, and even obtained her Third Eye. Benedict tells Michelle that her best course of action is to dissolve the curses of other victims and collect their Third Eyes as well, which will weaken the curse and allow her to challenge the Duchess for her freedom.

Michelle spends the next two nights fighting her way to two more victims of the curse and collecting their eyes. The second victim, Matilda, was a famous pop singer until she was cursed, and ultimately transformed into a monstrous squid creature in the abandoned aquarium. The third victim, Gabriella, entombed herself in her family crypt after acquiring the Third Eye and flaying herself alive.

In between fights, Michelle can engage with a colorful cast of characters, some of whom will influence her ultimate fate. Darrel, who works for the Duchess, entreats her for her help in getting his boyfriend, Oakley to accept his marriage proposal. At the same time, an angel named Clarissa wishes for Michelle to aid her in taking Darrel down, then replace him as the Duchess's right-hand man. Lucy, a silent young woman, is revealed to be a demon who offers to help Michelle destroy the Duchess for good and help her get back with her ex-girlfriend. The angel of love, Chamuel, is getting the cold shoulder from his demonic boyfriend (later revealed to be Dream Eater) to prevent them both from turning mortal, and is torn between pursuing their relationship even at the cost of their immortality or breaking the relationship off. The Duchess continues in their efforts to get Michelle to love them, though it becomes clear that they wish for her to love them in a way that would not be fulfilling for either of them.

Depending on who she chooses to help, Michelle can choose to break the curse in a multitude of ways. If Michelle gives Robyn the Duchess's key, a powerful artifact that would allow Benedict to seal the gates of Hell permanently, leave his post, and be with Robyn, Michelle breaks the curse and returns to mundane life. If Michelle helps ruin Darrel's relationship, she becomes the Duchess's new right-hand man, managing the Duchess's hotel and Darrel's old bar, allowing Clarissa to kill more demons. If Michelle follows Lucy's instructions, which involve helping Darrel, encouraging Chamuel to kill Dream Eater, and giving the key to Robyn, Lucy destroys the Duchess and possesses Michelle's body, rendering her expressionless and mute, just as the girl that was her previous host. If Michelle encourages Chamuel to pursue love, she is able to convince the Duchess to let her in, and the force of her love is enough to turn them mortal, forgetting their memories of the past, but finding Michelle weeks later at the convenience store.

== Development ==
Sorry We're Closed is the debut title of Bournemouth-based à la mode games, a two-person indie developer composed of creative director C. Bedford and technical director Tom Bedford. The game began development in November 2020 as a side-project during the COVID-19 pandemic, with the developers beginning to work on Sorry We're Closed full-time in late 2022. An announcement trailer for the game was published on 20 October 2023.Sorry We're Closed was exhibited at PAX East in March 2024, with a demo for the game released during Steam Next Fest in June 2024. The game was released on the previously announced release date of 14 November 2024.

== Reception ==
Reception

Aggregate scores
Aggregator	Score
Metacritic	83%
OpenCritic	91% recommend

Review scores
Publication	Score
Eurogamer	4/5
GamesRadar+	4.5/5
Hardcore Gamer	4/5
Shacknews	7/10
Bloody Disgusting	4/5
Siliconera	8/10
TheGamer	4.5/5
Metro	4/5
Slant Magazine	3.5/5
Vice	Recommended

According to review aggregator Metacritic, Sorry We're Closed received "generally favorable" reviews. The game was named as one of the best of 2024 by Eurogamer. Sorry We're Closed received praise for its narrative, characters and exploration mechanics, although some critics expressed criticism at the game's combat.

The game won the award for "Debut Game" at the Indie Game Awards 2025 after the title was stripped away from Clair Obscur: Expedition 33 over the use of generative AI, and was nominated for "Black Voices in Gaming". It was given an Honorable Mention for "Excellence in Narrative" at the 2026 Independent Games Festival Awards.
