= MasterType =

1981 video game

- Developer: Lightning Software
- Publishers: Lightning Software; Broderbund Software
- Director: Bruce Zweig
- Platforms: Apple II, Atari 8-bit, IBM PC, VIC-20
- Release: 1981
- Genre: Typing
- Mode: Single-player

MasterType is a typing video game created by Bruce Zweig for the Apple II and published in 1981 by Broderbund Software. It was ported to Atari 8-bit computers, IBM PC, and VIC-20.

== Gameplay ==
In the game, the player has a ship positioned in the center of the screen. Letters, words, numbers, or symbols appear on the four corners of the screen, which the player must type on the keyboard. These words are accompanied by a missile, satellite, or fireball that moves toward the ship and can be destroyed by typing the associated word. A new word and a new object then appear on the corresponding corner of the screen. The player's ship is protected by four shields, corresponding to each of the four corners, which can each withstand the damage of one object. If the ship is hit by a second projectile from the same corner, it is destroyed and the game ends.

== Reception ==
Steve Stone of Ahoy! says, "If you have a disk or datasette device, this game is great fun and very useful. If you don't have either device, the game will only take you so far." Eric Freedman of PC Magazine rated MasterType with 12.5 points, saying, "MasterType is fun to play, regardless of whether or not you want to improve your typing skills." Games Magazine called MasterType "a playful way to learn touch typing". Robert DeWitt of Antic says teachers and educators will, "no doubt, find [MasterType] a Godsend."
