= Where Is My Heart? =

2011 video game

- Developers: Schulenburg Software; Die Gute Fabrik
- Publisher: Die Gute Fabrik
- Platforms: PlayStation 3; PlayStation Portable; Microsoft Windows; macOS; Linux
- Release: PlayStation 3, PlayStation Portable: NA: November 8, 2011; EU: November 16, 2011; Windows, macOS; May 29, 2014; Linux; TBA
- Genres: Platform; puzzle
- Mode: Single-player

Where Is My Heart? is a platform video game developed by Danish studios Schulenburg Software and Die Gute Fabrik. It was released as a PlayStation mini on the PlayStation Network in North America on November 8, 2011 and Europe on November 16, 2011.

On March 2, 2012, Die Gute Fabrik announced plans to release the game for Windows, macOS, and Linux in the spring of 2012, a date which was pushed back, eventually seeing the Windows and macOS versions released on May 29, 2014, with the Linux version "still on the way..."

== Story ==
Where Is My Heart? tells the story of a family of three monsters who find themselves lost in the forest after setting out to find their home (a tree) after it mysteriously floats away one day. Elements of familial struggle and working together are sprinkled throughout.

== Gameplay ==
An example of a level broken up into shuffled frames, which the player must figure out how to navigate.

The game starts out as any platformer might, but soon the image breaks into frames of varying sizes, often shuffling them. The player must then try to navigate their way through the level, by piecing together where their character appears to be in any given frame, as well as collecting hearts or figuring out other puzzles that might feature in a level. The player is able to switch between one of the three monster characters at will, each of them having a special ability that can aid in solving a level.

== Development ==
The idea for the game was derived from Die Gute Fabrik designer Bernhard Schulenburg's memories of being lost in the woods as a child while on a hike with his parents. The game is also an homage to platformers of the 1980s and '90s, and its story and art direction are inspired by "German fairytales, the mythical creatures of Central Europe, and Japanese pictogram aesthetics."

== Reception ==
Reception

Aggregate score
Aggregator	Score
Metacritic	(PSP) 81/100 (PC) 74/100

Review scores
Publication	Score
The A.V. Club	(PSP) B+
Destructoid	(PSP) 9/10
Edge	(PSP) 8/10
Eurogamer	(PS3) 8/10
GameRevolution	(PC) 7/10
GameSpot	(PC) 7/10
GameZone	(PSP) 9.5/10
Hardcore Gamer	(PC) 3.5/5
IGN	(PSP) 7/10
PlayStation Official Magazine – UK	(PSP) 8/10
Pocket Gamer	(PSP) 4.5/5
Push Square	(PSP) 9/10

The PSP version received "generally favorable reviews", while the PC version received "mixed or average reviews", according to the review aggregation website Metacritic.

GameZone reviewer David Sanchez gave applause to the gameplay and art direction, proclaiming the PSP version "...a wonderful experience that's both a work of art and proper homage to classic game design...one of the most genius gameplay formats seen in a platformer in a long time." Brendon Keogh of Edge praised the ingenuity in the separated frames mechanic, stating, "A less skilled developer could easily abuse such a novel device, but the restrained, careful design of Where Is My Heart? ensures the game lasts just long enough to get the most out of its mechanic without succumbing to padding." Christian Donlan of Eurogamer also commended the design as "...a concept so ingenious, I'm stunned I've never seen it before."

Conversely, David Wolinsky of The A.V. Club found the same PSP version interesting but somewhat repetitive, saying, "A bit one-note. It's an incredibly interesting note, but still, there isn't much variation as you work your way through all 26 levels." The major complaint of IGN's Ryan Clements was simply that the game's play-through time is too short, recommending the same PSP version with a caveat: "Play it for something a little different, even if the experience doesn't last longer than a few hours."
