= Tiltan College of Visual Design and Communication =

- תילתן - המכללה לעיצוב ולתקשורת חזותית
- Motto in English: Academic excellence with a personal touch
- Established: 1994
- President: Erez Issacharoff
- Rector: Michal Wang
- Faculty: 95
- Location: Haifa, Israel; 32.8210°N 34.9975°E
- Campus: Urban
- Colors: Green
- Website: Tiltan website

Tiltan School of Design and Visual Communications (Hebrew: תילתן - המכללה לעיצוב ולתקשורת חזותית) was founded in 1994 in Haifa, Israel, and is located on Independence Street in the city. It was the first college to be located on the Port Campus in Haifa, opposite the Port of Haifa.

== Departments ==
Tiltan has four departments: graphic design, interior design, game design and development, and vibe coding, as well as an extension studies program. Alongside certificate tracks, the college offers a European degree in design, which is not recognized by the Council for Higher Education in Israel.

The vibe coding department consists of three months of study followed by nine months of work with clients in the college's incubator.

== Game design and development ==
Students in the game design and development department work with the Unity and Unreal Engine game engines. Tiltan is an academic partner of Unity, through the Unity Academic Alliance, and of Epic Games. In 2017, Unity opened a training and certification center at Tiltan, its first in Israel. Clover Bite, a game studio founded by the college in Haifa that employs its students, developed the video game Grime, released in 2021.

The college hosts the Haifa site of the Global Game Jam each year.

== Community ==
A laboratory of Haifa3D ("Give Me a Hand in 3D"), a non-profit organization that 3D-prints prosthetic hands for children, operates at Tiltan. The organization was founded with the help of the Technion and under Tiltan's sponsorship.

The college holds a graduate exhibition each year. In 2025, graphic design graduates presented works on the theme of the Ten Commandments.

== Port Campus ==
The Port Campus is an academic complex established as part of a plan to rejuvenate the lower city area in Haifa. As part of the program, preserved buildings are used as student dormitories for higher education institutions.

As of 2011, the port campus includes buildings of the Carmel Academic Center, Tiltan College of Visual Design and Communication, and the University of Haifa as well as student dormitories

== Sources ==
- The Port Campus complex, Haifa Municipality
- Tiltan Profile
