= David Lynch Teaches Typing =

2018 video game

- itch.io version header art
- Developer: Rhino Stew Productions
- Platforms: Windows, Linux, Macintosh
- Release: 27 February 2018
- Genre: Educational
- Mode: Single-player

David Lynch Teaches Typing is a 2018 game by independent developer Rhino Stew Productions. Described as a "short playable interactive comedy game" and an "interactive experience", David Lynch Teaches Typing is a satire of touch typing educational software titles such as Mavis Beacon Teaches Typing. A likeness of David Lynch assists the player in completing a series of increasingly bizarre and unsettling typing tasks.

== Gameplay ==
A screenshot of David Lynch Teaches Typing.

Asserting he will assist the player as a guide "through the magical world of typing", a likeness of David Lynch instructs the player to input various characters on their keyboard. Following simple prompts to press the F and J keys, Lynch instructs the player to press their finger on the "undulating bug" next to the keyboard, of which the player's failure to do so causes the game to temporarily crash. After being instructed by Lynch to press the A key, a series of disturbing images and sounds ensue, causing the game to end. It is revealed the game is a trial for a full product, which Lynch instructs the player to acquire by going to the nearest bathtub and "make smacking noises with your hands until someone can assist you".

== Development ==
David Lynch Teaches Typing was developed by Luke Palmer, a filmmaker and founder of Rhino Stew, in collaboration with independent developer Hyacinth Nil. Palmer, who formerly had worked as a typing tutor, stated the "hellish" nature of "motivating kids to type" had a "macabre and mundane element perfect for David Lynch". Palmer integrated elements of David Lynch films in the game, such as the undulating bug as a "homage to Eraserhead", noting that the game's intent was to evoke "its own kind of Lynchian hell." David Lynch Teaches Typing was also showcased in the exhibition Hunt and Peck: Alternative Expressions of the Keyboard at the Chicago Video Game Art Gallery in June 2018.

== Reception ==
David Lynch Teaches Typing received positive attention from numerous outlets. Many critics expressed amusement or bewilderment at the game's absurd premise. Writing for Slate, Rachel Withers stated the game was a "painfully, slow, fittingly weird typing tutorial that will inevitably glitch out on you." Critics also praised the interpretation of David Lynch and his work in the game. Jordan Devore of Destructoid suggested players will "probably get a kick out of (the game) if they're familiar with Lynch's work and mannerisms". Amanda Kooser of CNET similarly observed "Rhino Stew's Lynch impersonator does a good job of replicating the director's speech patterns". Jess Joho of Mashable praised the game as a "perfect translation of (Lynch's) sensibilities to games...by turning the comforting, nostalgic virtual spaces of everyday modern life into something horrifying." Many critics commented on the game's nostalgic and effective evocation of 90s educational entertainment games, with Erin Schwartz of Vice stating "the game's design is familiar to Mavis Beacon graduates.
