= Nanotale – Typing Chronicles =

2021 typing video game

Nanotale
- Developer: Fishing Cactus
- Publisher: Fishing Cactus
- Engine: Unity
- Platforms: Linux, macOS, Windows, Stadia
- Release: March 31, 2021
- Genres: Adventure, typing
- Mode: Single-player

Nanotale – Typing Chronicles is a fantasy adventure and typing video game developed and published by Fishing Cactus and released from early access on March 31, 2021 for Linux, macOS, Microsoft Windows, and Google Stadia. It is the second game in the Typing Chronicles series after Epistory – Typing Chronicles. The main character is Rosalind, an archivist with a talent for word magic. It received mixed reviews from critics, who praised its world design, lore, and mechanics, but criticized the story as weak.

== Development ==
The game was developed in the Unity engine, although an early prototype was created in Construct 2.

Like the previous game in the series, the game tracks how fast the player is typing, but only to adapt the game's difficulty to the player's skill.

Bruno Urbain, the CEO of Fishing Cactus, stated that the game was brought to Stadia in order to "bring the game in front of a larger player base with different tastes".

== Reception ==
Nanotale received an aggregate score of 70/100 on Metacritic, indicating mixed reviews.

Cosmin Vasile of Softpedia rated the game 85/100, praising the word magic and world design, as well as the soundtrack, calling the game "unique", as well as "bright and optimistic". However, she criticized the story as slow, and some parts of the game as "aimless". She also said that the voice acting was not up to the same standard as the soundtrack.

In a preview, Jordan Helm of Hardcore Gamer called the game "easily one of this year's more intriguing concepts", saying that it "hardly loses its allure". While calling its variety "[not] that expansive", he praised the game's "unique take" on its combat system. Matthew R. of Eurogamer compared the game to Magicka meets Typing of the Dead, saying that "encounters become a frantic balance", and calling it welcome to play a dungeon crawler "without clicking a mouse over and over".
