= Typing game =

Video game genre

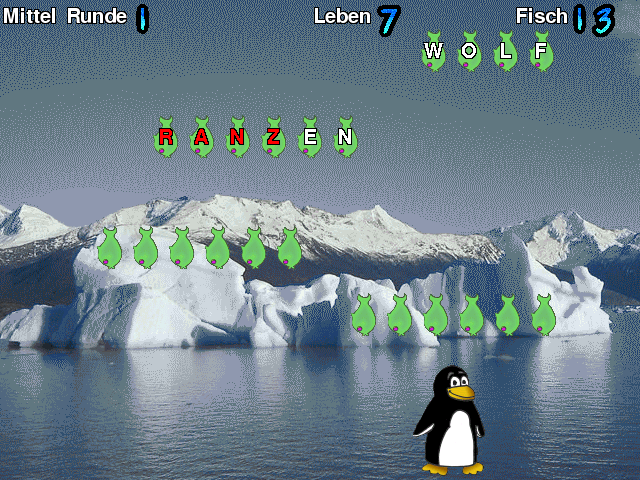
Tux Typing, a typing game for Linux

A typing game is a genre of video games that involves correctly entering letters, words, or sentences on the keyboard. It began as a sub-genre of educational games designed to familiarize players with keyboard use and to improve skill at touch typing. Successfully typing a letter or word is tied to an action, such as firing a weapon at an attacking space ship. Companies associated with video games, like Broderbund, Atari, Inc., and Sirius Software all released typing games in the early 1980s. More formal educational software like Mavis Beacon Teaches Typing (1987) incorporates minigames as a practice option. Some later games, like Type Rush, add online competition based on players' typing speeds, making typing more addictive.

In the 2000s, a number of independently produced parodies of educational typing games reinvigorated the genre. Other games are built around typing as a method of interaction, removing the educational aspect altogether.

== Early commercial releases ==
Broderbund's MasterType, released in 1981 for the Apple II and Atari 8-bit computers, is similar to the Space Zap arcade game; shooting an attacker requires pressing the correct key in time. Type Attack from game publisher Sirius Software, and the unrelated Typo Attack from Atari, Inc., are both shooter-inspired typing games released in 1982. Mavis Beacon Teaches Typing (1987) includes several typing-related minigames.

== Parodies and typing as a game mechanic ==
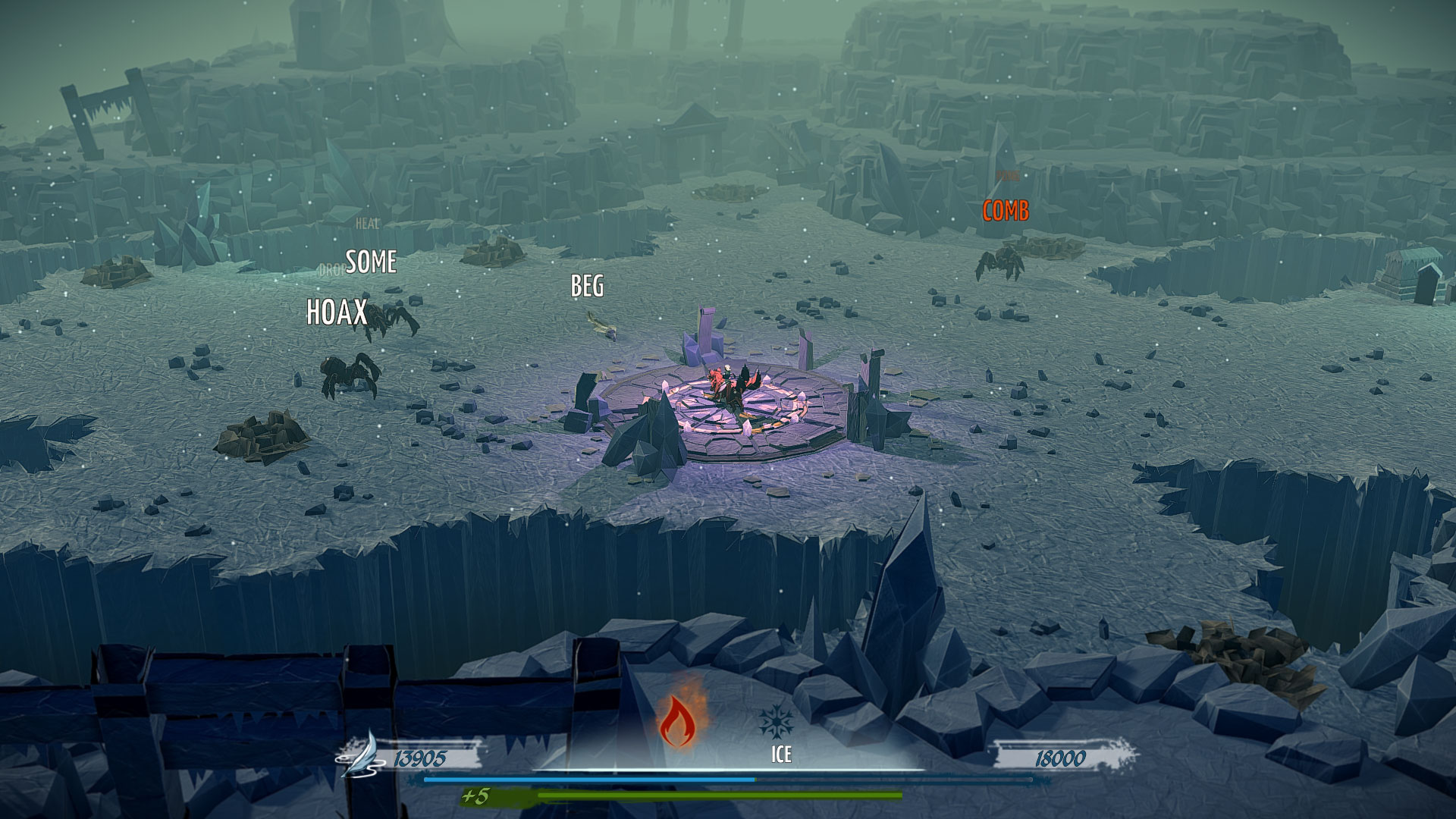
The 2016 typing game Epistory, showing creatures with words above them: the player must type the words to attack the creatures

In 2000, The Typing of the Dead became known as the "ultimate typing game parody", adapting The House of the Dead 2 to replace the gun with a computer keyboard so that the player must type to defeat zombies.

A resurgence in typing games among indie titles saw the releases of parodies of typing tutor games, including David Lynch Teaches Typing, Cooldog Teaches Typing, and Icarus Proudbottom Teaches Typing. Non-parodic games were also developed, such as Keyboard Sports, The Textorcist, Epistory - Typing Chronicles, and Nanotale - Typing Chronicles, which largely dropped the educational context of the genre and featured similar gameplay and storytelling as a traditional video game. The video game series Cook, Serve, Delicious! was noted as being an "accidental" typing game, as despite the fact that it was a fan remake of an initially controller-based series, the move to personal computers necessitated the addition of keyboard controls.

As typing games branched out and crossed over into other genres, their developers faced challenges advertising the games, due to the fact that most people still assume them to be edutainment. Diego Sacchetti, designer of The Textorcist, stated that when the game released in 2019, 90% of the coverage from critics compared the game to Mavis Beacon, causing him frustration, as he would classify it as a "type 'em up".

In the modern day, typing games have caused players to think of the device in "new, more interesting ways". Compared to the past, the need to learn typing is less prevalent, since most people do it from an early age, enabling developers of typing games to pursue non-educational gameplay.

Recent examples of modern day typing game design include Cryptmaster, a fantasy RPG in which major actions in the game involve guessing and typing out words connected to certain abilities. Blood Typers is a multi-player survival horror game in which moving the character around and performing actions require choosing and typing specific words in real time. Glyphica: Typing Survival is a minimalist rogue-like and bullet hell shooter game which has been called a Soulslike. Dead Letter Dept. is a psychological horror game where the conditions and subject media for entering in prompted text gradually become more surreal and stressful.
