= Kardboard Kings =

2022 video game

- Developers: Henry's House, Oscar Brittain, Rob Gross
- Publisher: Akupara Games
- Platforms: Microsoft Windows; Nintendo Switch
- Release: Microsoft Windows; February 10, 2022; Nintendo Switch; December 8, 2022
- Genre: Business simulation

Kardboard Kings is a single-player management shop-keeper game, which is developed by Henry's House, Oscar Brittain, Rob Gross and published by Akupara Games. Kardboard Kings released on February 10, 2022 to Steam and other PC storefronts. It was later ported to Nintendo Switch on December 8, 2022. The title is translated to English, French, Spanish - Spain, Japanese, Simplified Chinese and Russian.

== Gameplay ==
Players run a local card store in the Australian beachside community of Parakeet Bay. Its premise is heavily influenced by trading card games, and players are able to collect various card arts through different set releases and choose how to interact with their customers.

== Plot ==
The player is Harry Hsu, a young man who inherited a card game store from his recently deceased father. He meets Giuseppe, his father's pet bird who can talk, who helps him get the shop open and running again. Harry was living in Berlin with his girlfriend Riley when his dad died, and he rushed back for the funeral without her. He then immediately threw himself into running the card shop, and the two sort of broke up by default, as she was still in Berlin. Harry's dad, George Hsu, was the first Warlock World Champion in the 90s, and was good friends with Christopher Marlowe, the creator of the Warlock Collectible Card Game.

He retired and opened up the Card Shop with the help of Giuseppe and Christopher Marlowe, and ran it for many years. The Warlock Collectable Card Game is the most popular game in the world, played by over 300 million people in 70 countries. Its popularity and Prize pools eclipse the salaries of many sports stars, and pro players are regarded as celebrities. There are rumors that the game was adapted from an ancient, magical game, played in South-east Asia, but the Warlock Company strenuously denies these claims...

== Development ==
Kardboard Kings is developed by Henry's House, Oscar Brittain and Rob Gross. Henry's House was founded by Oscar Brittain and Rob Gross in 2020. Oscar, a well-known Australian artist who previously developed Desert Child with Akupara Games handling publishing, is currently working on Nanomon Virtual Pet alongside Kardboard Kings, which is set to "hatch" in 2022.

== Reception ==
Kardboard Kings received mostly positive reviews from critics. Christopher Livingston of PC Gamer praised its gameplay, humor and romance options. Meg Peliccio of TheGamer also praised its depth of gameplay, describing its premise as nostalgic. Iskmogul described the title as "[...] little indie game that has a surprising amount of charm."
