= Grime (video game) =

2021 video game

- Developer: Clover Bite
- Publisher: Akupara Games
- Director: Yarden Weissbrot
- Producer: Yarden Weissbrot
- Designers: Yarden Weissbrot; Yonatan Tepperberg
- Programmer: Theodore Kovalev
- Artists: Nick Pochtariov; Adva Shamo; Yarden Weissbrot
- Writer: Yarden Weissbrot
- Composers: Alex Roe; Sean Secca
- Engine: Unity
- Platforms: Microsoft Windows; Google Stadia; Nintendo Switch; PlayStation 4; PlayStation 5; Xbox One; Xbox Series X/S
- Release: August 2, 2021: Windows, Google Stadia; August 2, 2021; PS4, PS5, Xbox One, Xbox Series X/S; December 15, 2022; Nintendo Switch; January 23, 2024
- Genres: Metroidvania, Soulslike, platform-adventure
- Mode: Single player

Grime (Note: (stylized as GRIME)) is a 2021 Metroidvania video game developed by Israeli independent developer Clover Bite and published by Akupara Games. The game was released on August 2, 2021 for Windows and Google Stadia, followed by versions for PlayStation 4, PlayStation 5, Xbox One and Xbox Series X/S in December 2022, and a Nintendo Switch version in January 2024. It received generally positive reviews from critics.

A sequel, Grime II, was announced on August 23, 2023.

== Plot ==
At the beginning of the game, one stone giant is shown breathing life - the Breath - into another, dead giant. The player, a small black hole later revealed to be called the Spiral Heart, is spontaneously formed deep within a cave, the Weeping Cavity, and makes itself a humanoid stone body. Within the Cavity, the Spiral Heart encounters numerous half-formed beings, the Stoneborn, who were not fully touched by the Breath. One of them, Yon, begins to assist the Spiral Heart, impressed by their perfect proportions. With the help of Yon, the Spiral Heart fights their way out of the Cavity, and traverses a desert to finally reach the Worldpillar.

There, they meet Shidra, a powerful, ancient humanoid serpent who sends the Spiral Heart on various quests to help them discover their true purpose in the world. The Spiral Heart fights adherents of the Shapely religion, Stoneborn who believe that gaining perfect forms will help them forget the Old Pain, the primal knowledge they are living dead beings, and servants of the Child, a mysterious entity. The Spiral Heart realizes their destiny is to consume and destroy the world, something Shidra opposes. Yon, enraged that he cannot escape the Old Pain, fights the Spiral Heart and is killed.

Traversing a tremendous wall erected by the Coda, beings made of flesh rather than stone, the Spiral Heart arrives in the awe-inspiring Cenotaph City. The Coda are revealed to have sealed themselves off from Shidra on account of their differing views, and welcome the Spiral Heart, which they worship as the "Endgiver", with open arms. They constructed the city and put on a grand final performance, the Celebration, in the hopes that they will be preserved in its memories despite their destined end.

Upon annihilating the Coda, the Spiral Heart ascends the Worldpillar, seeing memories that depict the giants' realization that Spiral Hearts are beginning to form, consuming them from inside. Shidra captures the Spiral Heart and attempts to convert them into a Stoneborn to stop the apocalypse forever. Should the Spiral Heart give in, they will be turned into a Stoneborn identical to their initial appearance, but missing the black hole head. Should the Spiral Heart choose to escape, they fight and slay Shidra, and climb to the Peak of Creation. There, they see several other fully-grown Spiral Hearts that have consumed their own giants. The Spiral Heart reaches their true form, ending all life within the giant they are shown to reside in.

As of the Tinge of Terror DLC, the Spiral Heart has a third option by which to end the game, this being the Reality Shift. If the player chooses to do this, the Spiral Heart will use their power to rip open a portal to a new reality (thus initiating a cutscene reminiscent of the one that opens the game when starting for the first time) and start the game over with everything they already possess, with no known limit to the number of times they are able to Reality Shift.

== Gameplay ==
Grime has been described as a Soulslike-influenced Metroidvania. In the game, the player controls "The Vessel," which is an incredibly strong being born of "levolam," the world's concept of earth, and who has what appears to be a black hole for a head. It is a sidescrolling platformer designed to be difficult through "tough combat" and "rigorous platforming." Unlike most other soulslike games, in Grime, the player does not lose progress upon death; the game, however, does retain the bonfire concept, except the bonfire itself is replaced with an obelisk made out of levolam called a "surrogate." At each surrogate, The Vessel is able to increase its stats and learn new abilities using "mass," the game's currency and experience point system.

The Vessel landing a hit on one of the game's bosses for 66 damage - The Vessel's four essential metrics are located in the top left of the image and its mass on the bottom right.

Grime's world is filled with "tunnels, chambers, and nooks and crannies," in which some NPCs use mysterious riddles and metaphors to tell the game's cryptic story, while others "mutter away" incoherehently. Due to the seeming lack of a coherent story at first, the game encourages and rewards exploration and experimentation. After defeating bosses, The Vessel learns new "Metroid-style" abilities that are required to progress further. As is typical in a Metroidvania game, platforming and backtracking are core elements of the game.

The Vessel has a healthbar, a stamina bar known as "Force," a breath bar, and an "Ardor" meter, all four of which are essential metrics in the game. As The Vessel is attacked, the healthbar depletes and, as is typical for a Soulslike, enemy attacks are strong and deal powerful attacks that quickly depletes it. Once it reaches 0, The Vessel is destroyed and respawns at the latest accessed surrogate. The stamina bar, which determines how many actions The Vessel can perform, depletes rapidly, leaving The Vessel vulnerable. Enemy attacks, however, are predictable, and can be easily avoided by jumping, dashing, pulling an enemy, or parrying if correctly timed.

Grime's unique feature is the "absorb" mechanic, the game's parry action, during which The Vessel sucks in an enemy or an enemy's attack using its black-hole-esque head, which provides for offensive and defensive evasion. Grime emphasizes parrying, and is a critical component of the gameplay, greatly rewarding the player for it when done correctly. Absorbing an enemy's attack will reflect the attack back at the enemy (or other nearby enemies), while absorbing a weak enemy will destroy it and absorbing a large enemy will greatly damage it. Absorbing either an enemy or their attack may partially refill The Vessel's health, but absorbing an enemy will always refill a portion The Vessel's breath meter. The Vessel may restore a large portion of its health using breath when the breath meter is filled, and is the main way of health regeneration in the game, and may also be used to unlock performance boosting traits. Enemies, however, may also be killed using conventional weapons such as swords, axes, and clubs, which range from hitting light and fast (using less stamina) to hitting hard and slow (using more stamina). Some enemies need to be absorbed before they may be attacked with conventional weapons. An incorrectly timed parry, however, may leave The Vessel vulnerable.

Ardor is an index that displays how much mass The Vessel will gain when defeating enemies. When attacked the number decreases, and when destroying enemies the number increases. Absorbing enemies increases ardor by a larger amount than using traditional weapons.

== Development ==
Clover Bite is the internal studio of Tiltan School of Design, based in Haifa, Israel. The studio collaborated to develop the game, with Akupara Games publishing the title.

The director Yarden Weissbrot, stated he wanted to create "something Israeli gamers could be proud of".

== Reception ==
Reception

Aggregate score
Aggregator	Score
Metacritic	PC: 81/100

Review scores
Publication	Score
Hardcore Gamer	4/5
IGN	9/10
Shacknews	8/10

The game received an aggregate score of 81/100 on Metacritic, indicating "generally favorable reviews".

David Wildgoose of IGN rated the game 9/10 points, calling it "an accomplished Souls-like action RPG". James Cunningham of Hardcore Gamer rated it 4/5 points, saying it was a "classic and fantastically designed Metroidvania".
