= The Metronomicon: Slay the Dance Floor =

2016 video game

- Developer: Puuba
- Publisher: Akupara Games
- Platforms: Microsoft Windows, macOS, PlayStation 4, Xbox One
- Release: Microsoft Windows, macOS September 29, 2016; PlayStation 4 August 29, 2017; Xbox One; August 30, 2017
- Genre: Rhythm game
- Mode: Co-op mode; multiplayer; single-player

The Metronomicon: Slay the Dance Floor is a rhythm game developed by American indie studio Puuba. The Metronomicon: Slay the Dance Floor was originally released on September 29, 2016, for Microsoft Windows and macOS, under the name "The Metronomicon". On August 29, 2017, Puuba added new content and released the game for PlayStation 4 and Xbox One on August 30, 2017, under the expanded name "The Metronomicon: Slay the Dance Floor".

== Gameplay ==
The Metronomicon: Slay the Dance Floor combines elements from rhythm and role-playing genres. During battles, the player hit notes to the beat of the soundtrack while switching between their team of four heroes. Heroes cast spells and activate abilities by completing rhythm sequences in lanes that scroll over their heads while electronic and indie rock tracks play. Monsters appear on the right side of the screen while the music plays, new ones swapping in as others are knocked. Players must swap between tracks on-the-fly in order to heal, cast elemental damage spells and cast buffs and debuffs. Successfully hitting notes allows the player to launch attacks or defenses against different enemies throughout the songs and levels. The re-release (entitled "Slay the Dance Floor") added new playable characters, passive abilities, Endless Mode, and a cooperative option for all modes of the game.

== Plot ==
Treacherous dance parties are appearing all over the planet. Wherever they arrive, dangerous monster congregate to dance, knocking down all in their path. A band of heroes from a specialized Dance Academy must travel around to investigate these parties, defeat the monsters, and discover the source of these musical invasions.

== Reception ==
The Metronomicon: Slay the Dance Floor reviews

Aggregate score
Aggregator	Score
Metacritic	81/100 (6 reviews)

Review scores
Publication	Score
PS Nation	9.5/10
Windows Central	4/5
Saving Content	4/5
Desconsolados	9/10
GamesBeat	8/10
RPG Fan	72/100

According to review aggregator website Metacritic, the game scores has 7.9/10, while on Gamerankings it received a total of 81.50%.
