= Typequick =

Australian courseware company

- Original logo upon Typequick's formation in 1985
- Industry: Touch-typing software
- Founded: 1985
- Founder: Noel McIntosh
- Headquarters: Sydney, Australia
- Products: Typequick (1982); Kewala's Typing Adventure (1996); Readquick (2001)
- Website: http://www.typequick.com.au/

Typequick Pty Ltd (stylised TYPEQUICK) is an Australian courseware company specialising in the development of computer-based touch-typing tutor systems of the same name. The first Typequick program was developed by Noel McIntosh's AID Systems in conjunction with Blue Sky Industries in 1982, as a tool for teaching typing skills among users of new micro computers. The Sydney based company of the same name was founded by McIntosh in 1985, after buying out the founders and acquiring the software.

The company has released products in multiple languages including English and Dutch, and sold particularly well in Japan. The company's Kewala's Typing Adventure saw the typing course re-envisioned as an adventure game aimed at a younger demographic.

== History ==
=== (1982–1985) Development and release of first Typequick program ===
Typequick is a Sydney-based touch-typing software originally developed by Noel McIntosh's AID Systems in conjunction with Blue Sky Industries in 1982. Back in 1965, McIntosh had served as UNIVAC Operations Research Consultant for Europe, where he taught about the training possibilities of computers. Additionally, as an IBM employee for many years, McIntosh became familiar with their series of microcomputers. By the 80s, personal computers were just becoming mainstream, and very few people needed or had proper typing skills. Having recently purchased an Osborne computer and unable to find suitable software to teach keyboard etiquette, the closest being IBM's Typing Tutor, he decided to devise his own.

Writer of the system's teaching technique, McIntosh's company AID Systems subsequently commissioned Ross Mitchell of Blue Sky Industries to program Typequick into C programming language. McIntosh's aim was to speed up the learning process, thereby teaching apprehensive tech novices how to use keyboards more efficiently and confidently, while helping experienced touch-typists improve their accuracy and speed; a secondary use of the software was in helping established users unlearn poor habits like two-fingered hunt and pecking (searching for individual keys and hitting them with index fingers).

McIntosh launched the product in February the following year at a 1983 Sydney computer show. An offer by computer entrepreneur Adam Osborne for sole rights was rejected. Similarly a licensing deal with Digital Equipment Corporation was unsuccessful due to their DEC Rainbow computer having a short shelf life. In August 1983, the Sydney Morning Herald reported the program was being marketed "in association with" Pitman Publishers; this branding would continue until at least March the following year. However, this relationship of Pitmans adding their seal of approval to Typequick's products was short-lived when Pitmans decided to create their own product.

Typequick began a market penetration into the United States, picking up distributors to work with the dealers. McIntosh visited the US in October 1983 to demonstrate the product for major software distributors, who, according to Your Computer were "impressed with its capabilities". Three distributors were appointed at the 1983 Boston Computer Show, however these all fell through. In 1984, AID Systems ran full display ads in US computing magazines Byte and Personal Computing, and planned to run ads in the Wall Street Journal, promoting a corporate training licence worth $US600. In 1986, the program was bundled in with the American microcomputer Apple IIe. Australian Personal Computer listed Typequick as one of the Australian developers that tried to enter the American market throughout the 80s to "varying degrees of success". By 1998, the company would secure a small market in the United States.

=== (1985–1986) Formation of Typequick company and Japanese localisation ===
In 1985 the Typequick company was formed to buy out the founders; McIntosh remained CEO, bringing on his friend Lode Van Grootel as CFO, while his wife Donna became CTO. The new directors decided to redesign Typequick's product packaging to be more appealing, and began selling to individual dealers; the first 12 units of the program were sold to Grace Bros, followed by ComputerLand. This initial success was followed by a period of mail order promotion, advertising, and editorials. Around this time, NSW Department of Technical and Further Education put out a tender for typing programmes to supply TAFE colleges which Typequick won. According to McIntosh, this "big break" helped the company pivot to selling directly to large companies and institutions, and led to further university contracts. McIntosh also believed that a recommendation in Your Computer's 1985 Personal Computer of the Year article helped legitimise the product.

Typequick sales would climb in 1986 once the company first exported their product overseas. The previous year, the distribution and publishing rights had been bought by Japanese Management Consultant Company during a trade mission; they would later be acquired by Data Pacific (Japan) who continued this relationship. Typequick introduced its package to Japan and worked directly on the product by purchasing a PC-9801, the target machine, and using Japanese tech manuals as no English translation existed. Character encoding software Shift-JIS was used to design a 3-in-1 course to teach the three Japanese keyboard layouts – hiragana, katakana and romaji; additionally it incorporated a Henkan trainer for kana conversion to Kanji words/characters. A key feature was teaching touch-typing through conversion of Japanese writing systems through a QWERTY keyboard. $105,000 was invested into the Japanese localisation and marketing, some of which was subsidised by the NSW Department of Decentralisation and Development.

Meanwhile, IBM Australia's Software Development Support Centre had bought the rights to release a version for the IBM JX and IBM 5500 series of computers, granting IBM non-exclusive marketing rights and distributing Typequick as a vendor product. The company's interest in Typequick's products came from the increasing requirements in the working community for keyboard skills. Published by IBM in 1986, the typing tutor became the first PC product developed within the country to be sold with a cover featuring the IBM logo. IBM agreed to drop their own Typing Tutor program in favour of repackaging Typequick under their own branding while retaining the Typequick generic name, and subsequently translated the program into Japanese. This situation led to two separate versions of Typequick in the Japanese market in mid 1986, both of which found a sizeable market. The Australian wrote that Typequick had helped introduce ten-finger typing to the country, which had previously relied on a 2000 character keyboard for Kanji characters.

=== (1987–1996) International growth ===
In addition to Japan, by 1987 the product had been licensed to the US, Britain, and the Netherlands; international distributors were generally publishing companies who also arranged translation of product manuals to accommodate local languages and dialects. Typequick's European distributor was Comprix, which published and marketed regional versions including Dutch. By 1989, IBM Japan had given the company its largest order to date, valued at $1m. By 1990, 250,000 people had used Typequick, with clients evenly split between domestic and international. However, despite the increased customer base, by this time Typequick only required a small staff of office admins. Within Japan, Typequick became a fixture of organisations like Toshiba, Mitsubishi and Itochu. Van Grootel noted that in addition to their Japanese publisher, Typequick had established its own contacts, and suggested that this lack of a middleman had led to greater profits; however he noted the language barriers involved in the company's operations in Japan.

The program soon reached government departments; by 1990 the United States Department of Defense had purchased 1600 copies of Typequick, while the Royal Australian Air Force and Dutch Ministry of Education had also secured licences. Additionally, legal firm Freehills used it to ensure their solicitors would be able to type at least 25 words per minute when performing their duties, while NRMA had over 1,200 terminal operators trained with the program. The Australian Financial Review (AFR) estimated that the program commanded three-fifths of the touch-typing market within Japan, 75% of the Dutch market, and 40% of the British market; additionally the paper suggested that between 1986 and 1990, 100,000 people in Japan learned to touch-type using the program. By this time, Typequick was also producing non-software products, including copyholders.

In 1990, Typequick reported they had been making a yearly profit since 1986, which AFR put down to their product being self-contained and self-explanatory, without requiring before or after-sales support. By 1991, Typequick products were widely used in Australian organisations like Australia Post, Qantas and Telecom to train staff, as well as TAFE colleges in New South Wales. The products were made available in additional foreign languages including Canadian French and German, and were used by overseas companies ranging from Heineken and Fujitsu to the University of Connecticut. That year, Typequick extended their touch typing software range by developing a product catered to blind people.

=== (1997–present) Kewala, the internet, and second incarnation of Typequick ===
The company decided, in 1997, to split the market into two segments, adults and juniors. The first product to target the junior demographic was the 1996 adventure game Kewala's Typing Adventure, which would be renamed Typequick for Students the following year to fit the new branding. Emphasising music and animation, Kewala's Typing Adventure was programmed in C++ and cost over $500,000 to develop; industrial psychologists helped design the software. As part of the promotional campaign, McIntosh and others embarked on Kewala's Trans-Siberian Adventure and Kewala's Trans-Japan Adventure, traversing both regions in classic cars.

In 1997-8, Typequick took part in the Lycos CyberSurfari, an internet-based treasure hunt aimed to introduce families to the World Wide Web. However, the advent of the internet proved a challenge for Typequick; McIntosh suggested that despite frequent demo downloads from their website and customer interest via email, there was a reluctance for online purchase due to "bad publicity about security".

In 1998, McIntosh delivered a lecture at Japan's Kansai University about the history of Typequick called 'Releasing Your Dreams'. By 2000, Typequick products were used in over 1700 schools across New South Wales, including all TAFE colleges and educational institutions like Metropolitan Business College WEA. In a 2001 edition of Typequick School Newsletter, the company announced a Typequick Certified Trainer program.

In 2001, Typequick entered its second incarnation when the company was bought by Leon Brummer who became the new CEO, and Peter Herman CTO. By this time, Typequick was exporting around $5 million of software to Japan annually; Japanese company Softbank used Typequick to train 40,000 officers within the Tokyo Metropolitan Police Department while Japan's Ministry of Justice used it to teach juveniles across the country's 53 youth jails. By 2002, Typequick was one of the two top-selling typing tutor programs alongside Typing Master.

== Products ==
According to McIntosh, Typequick is a "one-application company", producing over 10 variations of the software tailored to the specific needs of educational institutions, businesses, and the visually impaired across different languages and computers systems. The company systematically conducted research into design optimisation to improve Typequick's ability to remediate the user and motivate their learning. The program required constant updates to match the rapidly changing PC and MAC operating systems, disk formats and sizes, video displays and RAM.

Bi-annual upgrades with improved teaching techniques were released using the recorded results of tens of thousands of students, feedback from teachers and professors, and new PC operating systems and graphics. Typequick was originally delivered on a copy protected floppy; later versions included CD-ROM, thumb drive, Network versions for Novell, and WinNet across CP/M80, MS DOS, Windows, MAC, Apple 2, and IBM and MSDOS in Japan. Courses were developed for many different languages accommodating their alphabets and keyboard layouts: English, French Canadian, French, German, Dutch, Spanish, and three Japanese alphabets. Multi-platform Multi-user and educational licences were also made available.

While the gameplay varies, in the first edition users choose their intended skill level including 20 words-per-minute for business or professional or 40 words-per-minute for programmer, clerk, or secretary. The goal-oriented system displays text one line at a time, with the user typing exactly what appears on the screen. If they make a mistake, a bell sounds and a cursor stays on the most recent letter until it is corrected. Users receive reports on which letters were typed slowest or incorrectly. The user progresses through the levels, which requires them to increase speed and accuracy.

=== List of products ===
- Typequick (rebranded under Typequick Professional in 1997) for business, professionals, universities and vocational training. This program has been released on various versions and under different names. Items such as strong and weak keys, error ratio, and hesitation are recorded in a database, which informs generated exercises, on-screen messages and feedback reports. While previous editions were released on DOS, 1993's Version 7.0 was the first designed for the Windows platform, and known as Typequick Learn To Type or Typequick for Windows; this version used graphics like animated hands to show users correct finger movements and charts to show progress.
- Kewala's Typing Adventure (rebranded under Typequick for Students in 1997), an interactive animated typing tutor for schools and homes, released in 1996. Developed by an all-Australian team and costing $500,000, the program contained the full Typequick typing course disguised behind an edutainment video game.
- Typequick Skill Evaluator, a fully-automated typing speed test, was designed to evaluate new employees' competency with handling keyboards, while identifying staff in need of training by monitoring each keystroke within a chosen period and scoring the test for both speed and accuracy according to the Australian Standard.

== Critical reception ==
Typequick has received critical praise for improving typing skills of newcomers, and helping established users unlearn poor habits like 'hunt and pecking', while its design has been criticised. Its products have been compared to contemporaries like Typing Tutor and Mavis Beacon Teaches Typing. The company's products have secured numerous industry awards.

In August 1983, The Sydney Morning Herald positively compared Typequick and Typing Tutor II as superior products to their contemporaries Microtype and Mastertype due to their capacity to teach typing at high speeds; a decade later the newspaper saw Typequick as a "natty" private program suited to executives who were shy about their inability to type. In May 1984, Your Computer recommended it for children who were "into more serious pursuits than games".

Australian Personal Computer wrote the software had been recognised as "one of the best keyboard training packages around". Arts and Education Magazine asserted that the program was not easy to evaluate due to it being "one of the first truly interactive programs", though noted the products' clear screen layout and computer-based training techniques had been praised by professionals in that industry. Nic van Oudtshoorn of Australian Accountant recommended the tutor program, highlighting Typequick's numeric keyboard training. In 1989, the Royal Australian Air Force's computer manager reported that the program had improved their efficiency in teaching typing by two-thirds. Chartered Quantity Surveyor asserted that Typequick had "succeeded" as a specialist company devoted to the development of a computer-based typing course. Australian PC World's Peter Viola found the program to be easy to use and able to product swift results, though he disliked its more nonsensical sentences like 'fifi as she jailed Heidi Lee''. Alternatively, Your Computer appreciated the ability to type real words instead of meaningless letters. Jenny Sinclair of The Age suggested that Typequick had successfully turned an "apparently banal idea" into multi-million dollar export business.

One of Typequick's goals was in helping computer users unlearn poor habits like 'hunt and peck typing'; the company's success was addressed in several reviews.

David Meagher of Boss magazine compared Typequick to Mavis Beacon Teaches Typing, noting the ability to use both programs at one's own pace and in short spurts. Robert Bolton, The Australian Financial Review's Market Wrap editor, praised the product's positive feedback loop through messages like, "You are on your way to becoming one of the great typists!". Supporting Children with Motor Co-ordination Difficulties praised Typequick Success with Typing's graphics and thought its lessons could be tailored to individual needs, while Of Teaching, Learning and Sherbet Lemons wrote the interactive program could encourage dyspraxic students to begin typing as early as possible.

The Japanese localisation and Kewala's Typing Adventure have received positive reviews. Japan Times deemed Typequick an "intelligently conceived, no-nonsense program". The Australian Financial Review noted the "generous amount of publicity" it secured throughout the Japanese media, and opined on the "curious[ity]" of a software developed in Australia being used as a Japanese-language touch-typing tool. Upon its 1996 release, Mark Camm of the Sydney Morning Herald praised Kewala's Typing Adventure approach of surreptitiously hiding a "stuffy adult" typing course within an enjoyable Australian-themed adventure game. In 2000, the magazine gave the game's re-release a rating of 4 out of 5 stars, commenting that it improved upon its "popular and respected" predecessor Typequick. Meanwhile, the International Institute of Directors & Managers suggested Typequick's specialisation may have restricted its line extension and category dominance, pointing to Typequick's ‘learn to type’ branding which became a misnomer with the introduction of Readquick.

=== Awards ===
The company's products have secured numerous industry awards including: Your Computer's Personal Computer of the Year: Australian Commendation (1985), the Best Special Needs Program SIIA CODiE award for Talking TypeQuick for the Blind (1992), Software Information Centre (SOFTIC) Japanese Top Education Course of 1997 award for Kewala's Typing Adventure (1997), and the National Business Bulletin Business Star Award for Leading Market Share (1998).

In 1990, Japanese computer journal Nikkei Personal Computing nominated Typequick as the most well-known training software in the country, and in 1998 TypeQuick for Students received a nomination for SIIA CODiE's Best Home Education for Teenagers and Adults award. Computerworld honoured Noel McIntosh and his programming team in 1997 as a ComputerWorld Fellow "in recognition of outstanding contribution to computing in Australia".
