= Epistory – Typing Chronicles =

2016 video game

- Developer: Fishing Cactus
- Publisher: Plug In Digital
- Designer: David Bailly
- Programmer: Thibaut "Thibz" Hanson
- Artists: Benjamin "RYan" Lucas (3D) and Amandine Flahaut (2D)
- Writer: Joseph J Clark
- Engine: Unity
- Platforms: Linux, Microsoft Windows, macOS, Stadia
- Release: March 30, 2016
- Genres: Action-adventure, Typing
- Mode: Single-player

Epistory – Typing Chronicles is a 2016 action-adventure, typing video game developed by Fishing Cactus. The game was released on Steam Early Access in September 2015 and was officially released on March 30, 2016, for Linux, Microsoft Windows, and macOS, and on February 2, 2021 for Stadia. In the game, a young girl rides a fox with three tails. The game's story follows a writer's writing process, which unfolds like paper on-screen and is narrated from the perspective of the writer's internal thoughts. The game later received a spiritual sequel, Nanotale – Typing Chronicles.

== Development ==
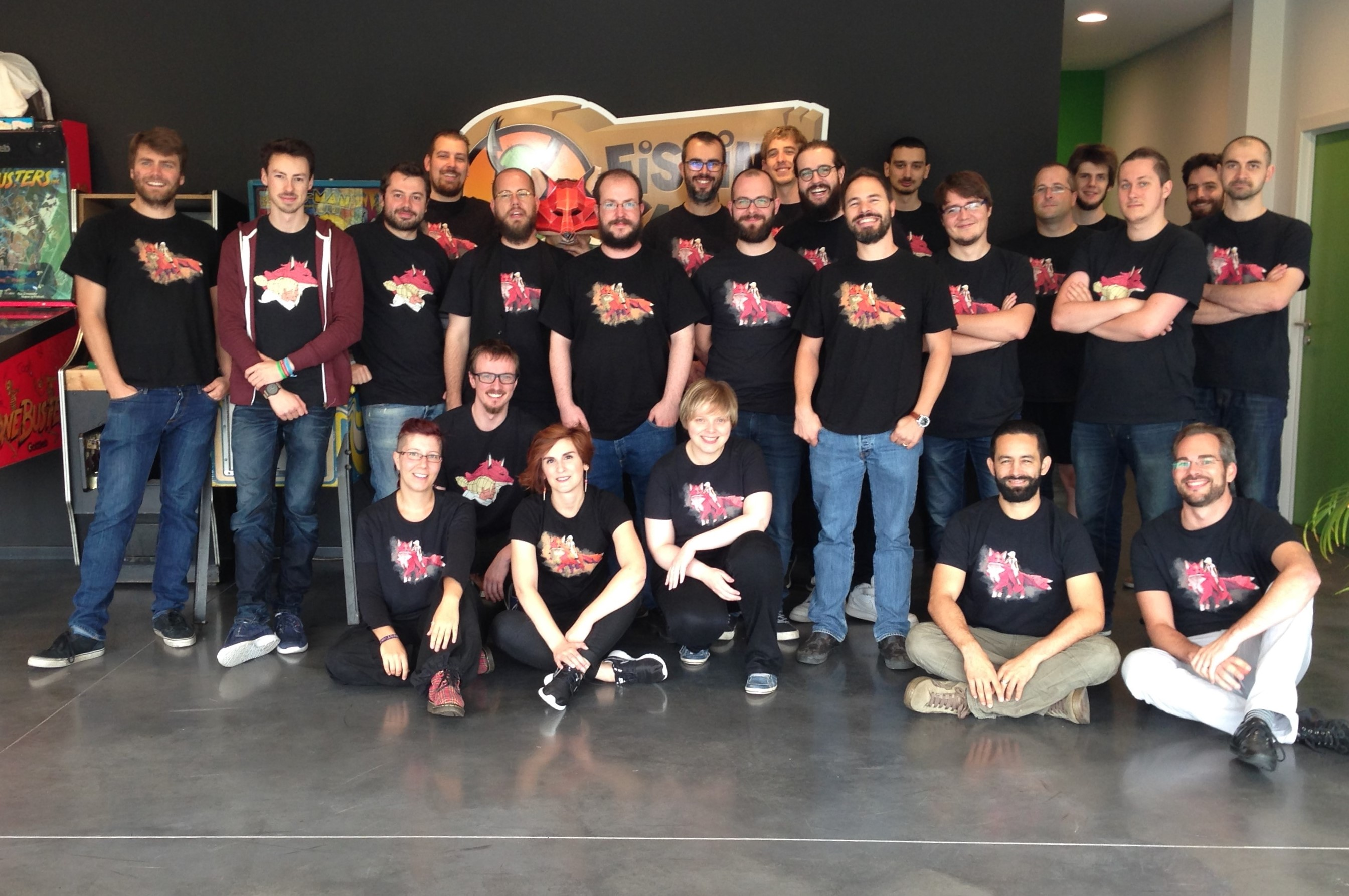
The full Fishing Cactus staff

Part of the challenge in making Epistory was to "feel like a game and not just a typing application". To that end, the developers emphasised player choice in gameplay design decisions. The game was developed in Unity, using the Tiled map editor. The use of Tiled made the ground tiles look artificial, so this was fixed using Shader Forge. The EFJI keys were used to move the character through the world to encourage good use of the home keys. The art design was influenced by another game project that Fishing Cactus was working on, with a World War I theme. Because the frame story of Epistory is about a writer, it seemed like a natural choice to have a paper-themed world. Later, the decision was made to take it into 3D and incorporate papercraft and origami designs. Epistory used random methods to populate levels with trees, which were then manually checked and edited by the designers before being saved as the level.

Epistory was released on Steam Early Access on 30 September 2015. Mac and Linux editions of Epistory were released on Steam Early Access in October 2015. Chapter Two was released in November 2015, and the price was increased to $12.99. Due to the popularity of the early access edition of the game, the deadline for release was pushed back to 2016 and more resources were devoted to the art design of the game, resulting in art assets that didn't match the earlier levels of the game. These were used in later levels to give the impression of the world becoming deeper as the player explores it. Epistory was available in English, French and German from the early access period, and Spanish was added later on. Mod support was added in June 2016, which allows players to change the words they typed in-game, add translations, and add support for different keyboard layouts.

== Reception ==
Reception

Aggregate score
Aggregator	Score
Metacritic	74/100

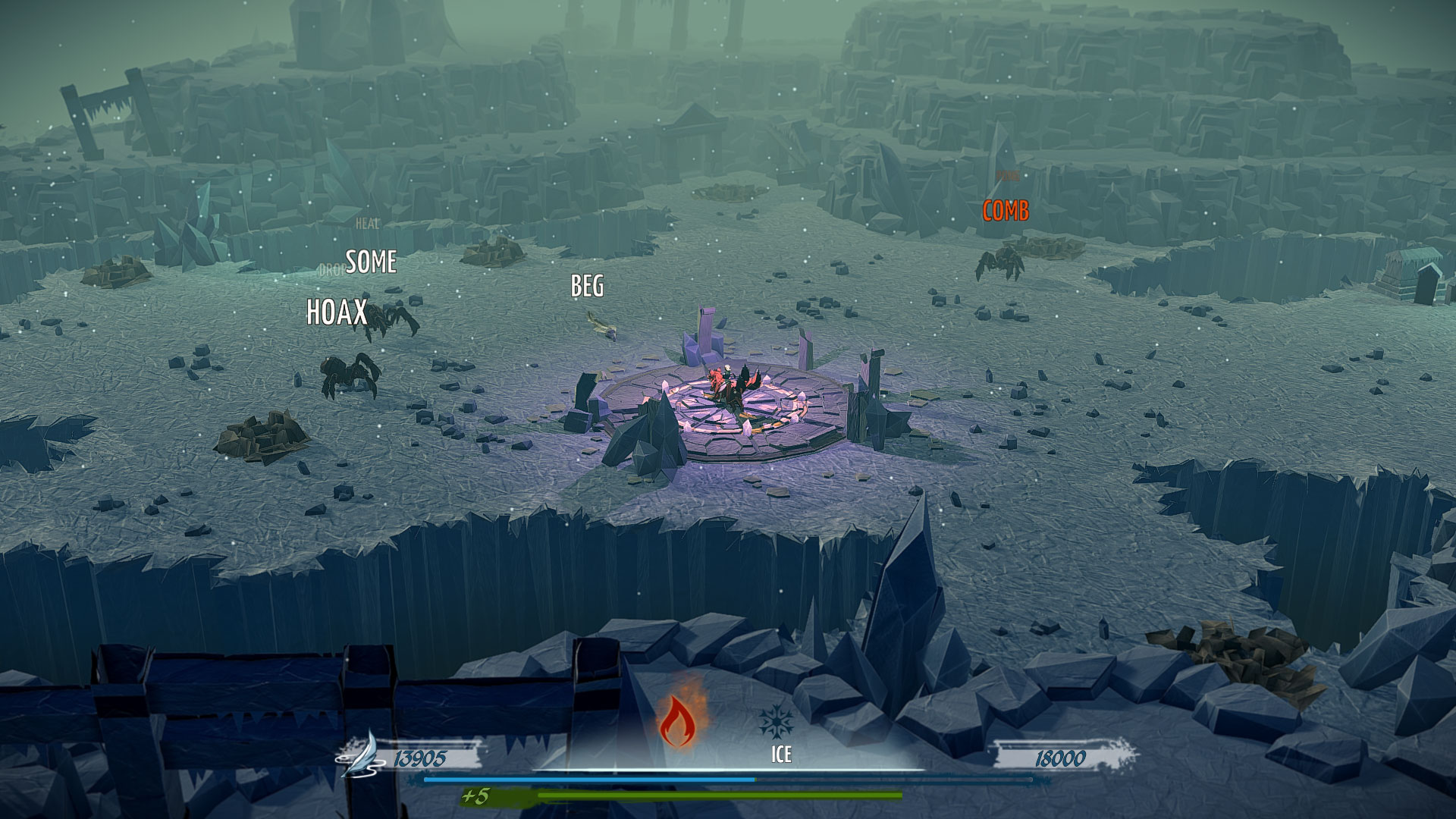
Reviewers praised the game's typing mechanics.

The game was nominated for the Indie of the Year Awards at IndieDB. Had an honorable mention in the 17th Independent Games Festival's Excellence in Visual Art category. The game received "mixed or average" reviews, according to video game review aggregator Metacritic. Multiple reviewers wrote in praise of its typing mechanics. Joshua Vanderwall, writing for the Escapist, described Epistory as a meditative experience. The game is a finalist for Best 3D Visuals at the Unity Awards 2016.

== Localization ==
The game has been localized to 8 languages besides English: French, German, Spanish, Polish, Portuguese-Brazil, Russian, Czech (trans. Jan Balek) and Japanese. The localized versions have been in some cases marked as significantly more difficult, because all forementioned languages use alphabets with more characters than English, e.g. Spanish (29 without accents), Russian (33 letters), Czech (41/42 letters). Despite the higher difficulty the localized game is still accessible to younger audience.
