= Behind the Frame: The Finest Scenery =

2021 video game

- Developer: Silver Lining Studio
- Publishers: Akupara Games; Akatsuki Taiwan
- Director: Weichen Lin
- Designers: Weichen Lin; Ric Yeh
- Programmers: Jany Weng; Harrison Chen; Shawn Hsaio
- Artists: Weichen Lin; Kaguya Huang; Knives Lai
- Writers: Weichen Lin; Jeremy Jhang
- Composer: Yuchain Wang
- Engine: Unity
- Platforms: Windows; macOS; iOS; Android; Switch; PlayStation 4
- Release: 25 August 2021: Windows, macOS, iOS, Android; 25 August 2021; Switch, PS4; 2 June 2022
- Genre: Adventure
- Mode: Single-player

Behind the Frame: The Finest Scenery is a point and click adventure game created by Taiwanese developer Silver Lining Studio, and co-published by Akupara Games and Akatsuki Taiwan Inc. The game was released for Microsoft Windows, macOS, iOS, and Android in August 2021, then for Nintendo Switch and PlayStation 4 in June 2022.

== Plot ==
With an art style reminiscent of Studio Ghibli, the game sees the player as an artist on the verge of finishing the final art piece for a gallery submission. As the painting nears completion, the player slowly uncovers an emotional history backed by chance and artistry.

== Reception ==
Reception

Aggregate score
Aggregator	Score
Metacritic	73/100

Review scores
Publication	Score
GamingTrend	70/100
GameSpace	7.5/10

The game received an aggregate score of 73/100 from the review aggregation website Metacritic, indicating mixed or average reviews. Judith Carl of Eurogamer called the game "magical-looking" and the gameplay calming. Rebekah Valentine of IGN said she never got tired of watching it, calling it "peaceful" and "Ghibli-looking". Pocket Gamer described the game as "a relaxing experience you’ll likely want to dive into when you’re snuggled up in bed after a long and tiring day at work". PC Gamer stated that "it's left me with a greater appreciation for the times when people I love want to share something with me, whether that's the art they've made, an outfit they've been coordinating, or just a bit of coffee". Alice Bell of Rock Paper Shotgun called Behind the Frame a "very sweet experience that is incredibly relaxed, at the same time as being a very bright, sunshine-filled thing that really inspired me to go out and create something myself". The Academy of Interactive Arts & Sciences nominated Behind the Frame for Mobile Game of the Year at the 25th Annual D.I.C.E. Awards.

== Awards ==
Year	Award(s)	Awarded By
2021	Best Visual Art, Best Experience, Best Storytelling, Best Indie Game	NYX Awards
2021	Best Mobile Game	DevGAMM
2021	Excellence in Visual Art, Best Overall Game	Asia Game Awards
2021	The Big Indie Pitch (Mobile Edition)	PGC Digital
2021	Best Game Made with Unity	Indie Arena Booth
