= Astrea: Six-Sided Oracles =

- Developer: Little Leo Games
- Publisher: Akupara Games
- Engine: Unity
- Platforms: Microsoft Windows; Nintendo Switch; PlayStation 4; PlayStation 5; Xbox One; Xbox Series X/S; Android; iOS
- Release: Microsoft Windows; September 21, 2023; Switch, PS4, PS5, Xbox One, Series X/S; September 26, 2024; Android, iOS; July 17, 2025
- Genre: Digital tabletop game
- Mode: Single-player

Astrea: Six-Sided Oracles is an indie digital tabletop game and roguelike developed by Little Leo Games and published by Akupara Games. Due to its use of dice and similarity to deck-building games, it was dubbed a "dicebuilder" by PC Gamer. The game was released on September 21, 2023 for Microsoft Windows and on September 26, 2024 for Nintendo Switch, PlayStation 4, PlayStation 5, Xbox One and Xbox Series X/S. It was also released for Android and iOS on July 17, 2025. It revolves around the successors to the titular "Six-Sided Oracles", who must save the entire star system from a spreading corruption caused by the Crimson Dawn Cataclysm. The game is similar to Slay the Spire in general structure, though its gameplay operates by different rules. The game received generally positive reviews from critics, who praised its art style and gameplay, believing the game to be well-designed overall, though some random and confusing elements were criticized.

== Gameplay ==
When the player starts a game, they are placed at the bottom of a top-down map with branching paths, containing battles, minibosses (usually split into easy and hard, but more rewarding fights), shops and events, some random. At the end of each area is an area boss that grants significant rewards for victory. Each run ends after the third area boss unless the player has unlocked the final challenge, Astrea's Heart, in which case it continues for an extra area to face the true final boss.

Astrea consists of six playable characters, each with a unique ability bestowed on them by their relic. This ability, as well as several other innate abilities, are called "Virtues". Their main Virtue can be used once per turn, while the others are triggered when their Corruption increases beyond a certain level, indicated by a meter with the Virtues displayed on it. Enemy attacks gradually corrupt the meter, while it can be purified or intentionally corrupted by the player to artificially trigger Virtues.

Each turn in battle, the player draws a "hand" of dice from their relic and rolls both their dice and the enemy's. Each die has an effect corresponding to a side. There are four main types of dice, Safe, Balanced, Risky, and Epic. Safe dice are guaranteed not to have Corruption effects, but are weak in power. Balanced dice are relatively split between Purification and Corruption, and moderately powerful. Risky dice have low or even a single beneficial effect of immense power, and potentially crippling negative effects, a deck of which may revolve around re-rolling or manipulating dice, or blocking Corruption. Epic dice are entirely safe dice with very powerful beneficial effects, and are only gained rarely; they cannot be duplicated. An additional type of die, Wound Hex dice, are added to the player's stockpile by enemies or negative dice effects. These dice are mostly Corruption, with a chance of Purification or destroying the dice. They disappear when the battle is over.

Characters have two to three hearts, representing their health. If the meter becomes fully corrupted by an enemy attack or player error, they lose a heart - if all hearts are lost, the character is corrupted and a game over results. When an enemy is fully purified, they flee or are destroyed, and the battle is won when all enemies are purified successfully.

The first playable character, Moonie, and a clock-like Sentinel (left) fight a crab enemy (right).

Players receive Star Shards as a reward in battle, a currency that is used to purchase items. The player can also pick up Star Blessings as rewards, which have a purely beneficial effect on the character or their deck. Black Hole Blessings, which are gained from area bosses, or, optionally, at the run's start, have more powerful beneficial effects, but also a negative effect on the player. The player can sacrifice one of their hearts at shrines to gain a Blessing in return, or choose to recover their health instead.

Sentinels, mechanical helper robots, can also be gained from events, shops, or from area bosses. Sentinels have their own purification meter, but no hearts - if the meter is fully depleted, they permanently break until the end of battle, save for one character with the ability to strategically destroy and repair them. Each Sentinel rolls a single fixed die depending on their model, though it can be increased to multiple dice via certain effects. Sentinels can also be upgraded up to five times, their default level increasing based on the area they are gained in.

== Plot ==
=== Setting ===
The game takes place long after a mystical star bestowed blessings upon a flourishing civilization. The star's disciples, the Six-Sided Oracles, sealed away magical gifts within relics called Astrariums. The civilization was one day struck by the Crimson Dawn Cataclysm, which engulfed the entire star system and corrupted many of its inhabitants. It ultimately defeated the Oracles and brought ruin upon the civilization. Descendants of the disciples, finding the relics left behind by the Oracles, travel to finish the battle and find the origin of the Catalysm.

=== Characters ===
The game's main characters are each a member of a different race of anthropomorphic beings that inhabit one of the six planets in the star system. The Noctuans are represented by Moonie, an owl who wields a grimoire. The Eridanian champion is Cellarius, a hammerhead shark with an anchor weapon. The Lacertians, a nearly extinct crocodilian race, are represented by Hevelius, a golem created in their image who uses a scepter to control mechanical sentinels, while the desert-dwelling Behenians are represented by Sothis, an exiled jackal who uses a magical hourglass to control time. The insectoid Austra of the Apians wields a lantern allowing her to manipulate the elements, and the final Oracle, Orion, a cuttlefish-like being from the Aquarian race, is the last surviving member of the original six, who was once their leader, and uses orbs to manifest four types of magic powers at once. The main villain is Astrea, the goddess of the six worlds, who has since become corrupted.

=== Story ===
Moonie is called to planet Aquarius by her book, and comes across Saiph, a fish-like robot who realizes she is actually an Oracle, and asks her to help his friend Meissa, an Aquarian who has become corrupted. Once freed, Meissa acts as a shopkeeper. Moonie and four other Oracles, each wielding their own Astrarium, journey to Ground Zero to find Astrea, defeating the corrupted enemies that stand in their way, but the path to Astrea is locked by a magical gate. Once the first five Oracles arrive at the gate, Meissa releases Orion from stasis, revealing him to be her older brother, though she has since aged to the point he is younger than her. Orion reveals that he fought to save the other original Oracles from Astrea, but failed, and was burdened by guilt, the intensity of which created a Karma Orb that was constantly corrupting Meissa. Meissa returns the orb to Orion, augmenting the powers of his original three.

Orion also reveals that, contrary to everyone's belief, Astrea has been corrupted beyond purification, and must be destroyed. The gate unlocked, one of the Oracles mounts a final assault on Astrea. After facing a corrupted Oracle doppelgänger, they defeat Astrea's Avatar, and, finally, the goddess' true form. Astrea loses her power, but survives as a crystal. She absolves the Oracles of any responsibility for the Cataclysm, explaining that, after creating the six races, she sought to become perfect, but her search for power caused her to accidentally corrupt herself. She further explains that, had she not been defeated, she would have collapsed into a black hole and annihilated the entire system. Astrea decides to leave forever, repairing any remaining corruption by entering the system's sun, but says that she will nevertheless always be watching over the Oracles and their kind.

== Reception ==
Reception

Aggregate score
Aggregator	Score
Metacritic	85/100

Review scores
Publication	Score
PC Gamer (US)	80/100
The Games Machine	8.8/10
Softpedia	4/5

Prior to release, Wes Fenlon of PC Gamer said that the game was "punching above its weight" for a small studio, calling its art "gorgeous" and saying that it seemed like it came from a much larger developer. He was impressed by the six possible playable characters. Ana Diaz of Polygon also called the game's characters "stunningly designed".

In a review, Dominic Tarason of PC Gamer called the game's characters "adorable cartoon critter-folk", saying that the game made a "strong impression" aesthetically. Calling the soundtrack "a tad generic", but still "memorable", he described its structure as "nigh-identical to [...] trailblazer Slay The Spire", but noted that the decision to trade cards for dice resulted in a different moment-to-moment experience. He praised the risk-reward aspect of the dice as an "exciting dynamic", saying that "rolling them is always fun", and called the game's Virtue system "ingenious", summing the game up as "thrillingly 'swingy'" and a "tense tightrope walk". However, he criticized the game's opening fights as the hardest part of a run, saying that "a few bad rolls" could doom the run.

Emanuele Feronato of The Games Machine called the graphics "inspired" and the replayability high, saying that the game would be greatly appealing to fans of Slay the Spire. Cosmin Vasile of Softpedia said that the game "does a lot with a little in the presentation department", saying that both player and enemy characters had a great deal of personality, and calling the game's interface "easy to understand and use". Calling the soundtrack "very good", he noted that the game had some difficulty spikes, and thought it did not innovate a great deal within the roguelike genre.
