= Sportsfriends =

2014 party video game

- Developer: Die Gute Fabrik
- Publisher: Die Gute Fabrik
- Platforms: PlayStation 3 PlayStation 4 Microsoft Windows; Mac OS X Linux
- Release: PlayStation 3, PlayStation 4; NA: 6 May 2014; PAL: 7 May 2014; Windows, OS X, Linux; 19 December 2014
- Genre: Party
- Mode: Local multiplayer

Sportsfriends is a party video game created by the Danish independent developer collective Die Gute Fabrik. It consists of four games: Johann Sebastian Joust, Super Pole Riders, BaraBariBall, and Hokra. It was released for PlayStation 3, PlayStation 4, Windows, Mac, and Linux. The game was funded through Kickstarter and received over US$150,000 from backers.

Johann Sebastian Joust does not have graphics or use a monitor. Instead, players try to hold a PlayStation Move controller still while others attempt to bump their controller. Die Gute Fabrik entered the minigame into the 2012 Independent Games Festival competition. Pole Riders is a polevaulting game created by Bennett Foddy. A prototype version is available as a web game. (Note: The prototype is available at foddy.net.)

== Johann Sebastian Joust ==
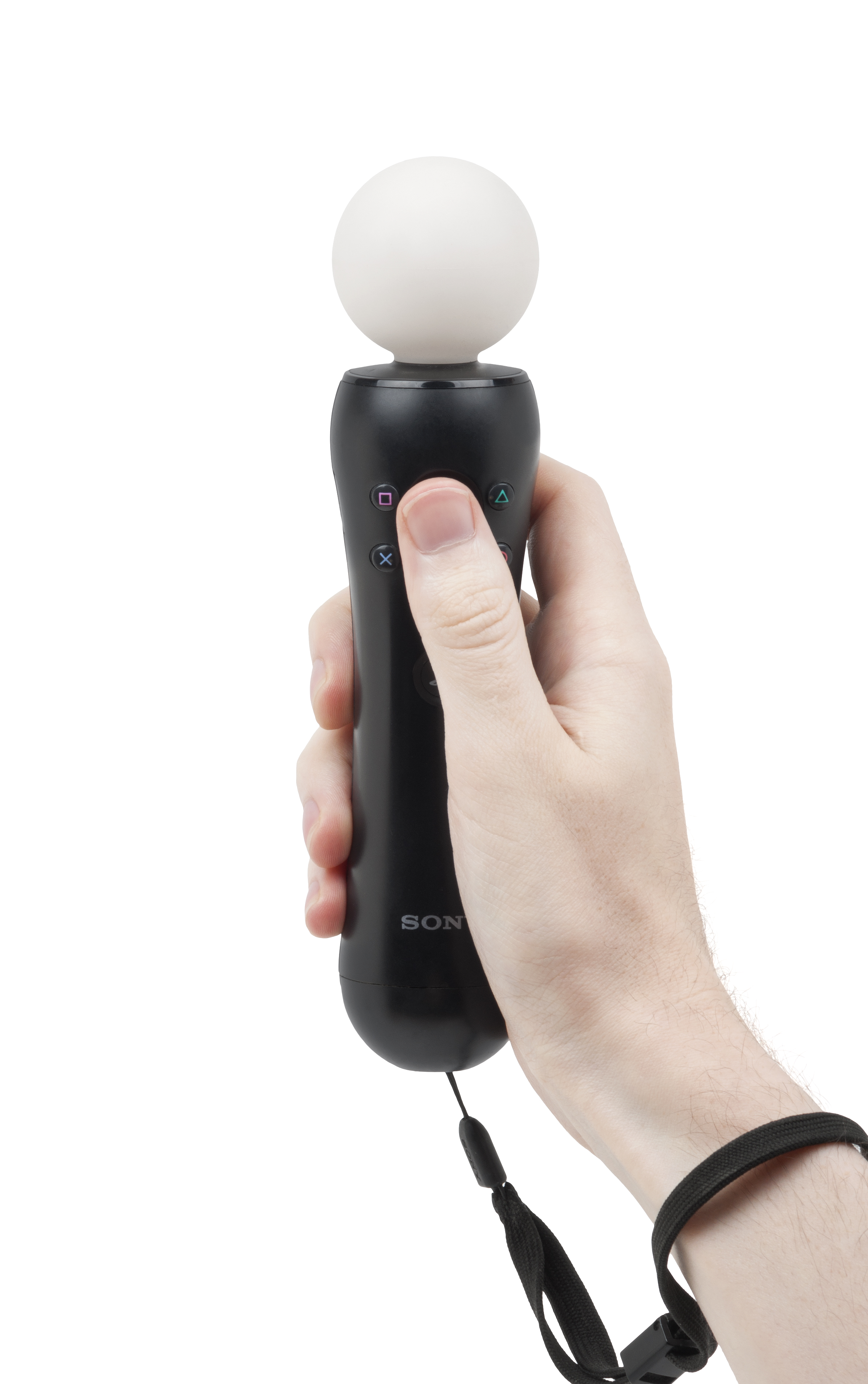
Each player in Johann Sebastian Joust is given a PlayStation Move controller which they must try to keep still while attempting to shake the other players' controllers.

Johann Sebastian Joust is a local multiplayer no-graphics contact sport video game created by Douglas Wilson. The objective of the game is to be the last man standing. This is done by players trying to cause a rapid motion in their opponent's controller: a PlayStation Move. During the game, music from Johann Sebastian Bach's Brandenburg concertos is played at a slow tempo. In relation to a player being knocked out, there is a tolerance of motion the controller will allow that is linked to the speed of the music. As the speed of the music increases, so does the motion tolerance, which allows players to move more rapidly without setting off their controller.

== BaraBariBall ==
BaraBariBall is a 2-4 player sports game with platform fighter elements. BaraBariBall injects a ball and goal into the platforming fighter genre, taking the priority away from killing an opponent. Instead, the players focus on scoring by throwing or dunking the ball into the opposing players' water, scoring one point upon a successful dunk. The players attempt to knock the ball out of each other's grasp by attacking the player in possession of the ball with directional based combat similar to the Super Smash Bros. series. However, the players are not limited to only one or two jumps, instead able to jump up to eight times as long as the player still has enough "charges". These are represented by circles floating around the character, which are consumed each time a player jumps and recharge as long as the player is on the ground. Once the player runs out of circles, the player falls. If a player falls into the water (the goals), the player dies and re-spawns at the center of the stage a few seconds later, causing their team to lose a point.

== Reception ==
Reception

Aggregate score
Aggregator	Score
Metacritic	(PS4) 82/100 (PS3) 81/100

Review scores
Publication	Score
Destructoid	(PS4) 7/10
Edge	(PS4) 8/10
Eurogamer	(PS4) 9/10
GameSpot	(PS4) 8/10
Hardcore Gamer	(PS4) 4/5
IGN	(PS4) 8.7/10
Joystiq	(PS3) 4/5
PlayStation Official Magazine – UK	(PS4) 8/10
Polygon	(PS4) 9/10
Push Square	(PS4) 7/10
Shacknews	(PS4) 8/10
Metro	(PS4) 9/10

The PlayStation 3 and PlayStation 4 versions received "favourable" reviews according to the review aggregation website Metacritic. Jeremy Peeples of Hardcore Gamer said of the latter console version, "It mixes the competitiveness of real sports with video game conventions and is the absolute best reason to own a PS camera on the PS4."

=== Awards ===
Johann Sebastian Joust won two awards, Impact and Technology, at IndieCade 2011, while Hokra received the Audience Choice award at IndieCade 2012. Polygon placed Johann Sebastian Joust at #64 among the decade's best.
