= Cryptmaster =

2024 video game

- Developers: Paul Hart; Lee Williams
- Publisher: Akupara Games
- Producers: Harri Staub; Lilianda Marsh
- Designers: Paul Hart; Lee Williams
- Programmer: Paul Hart
- Artist: Paul Hart
- Writer: Lee Williams
- Composer: Surasshu
- Engine: Unity
- Platforms: Windows, Xbox One, Xbox Series X and Series S, PlayStation 4, PlayStation 5,
- Release: WW: May 9, 2024
- Genres: Puzzle, RPG, dungeon crawler, word game
- Mode: Single-player

Cryptmaster is a 2024 role-playing word game developed by Paul Hart and Lee Williams, and published by Akupara Games. It was released on Steam, GOG, and Itch.io on May 9, 2024 for Windows. The game is played by typing words on a keyboard.

It has received positive reviews for its gameplay and visual design. It has won awards from Independent Games Festival, BIG Festival, and IndieCade.

== Gameplay ==
Gameplay screenshot.

The player controls a party of four members: Joro (a fighter), Syn (a rogue), Maz (a bard), and Nix (a wizard). The player is accompanied by the eponymous Cryptmaster, a necromancer who also acts on the player's behalf during some interactions. Additionally, the Cryptmaster provides assistance and guidance throughout the game, explaining the mechanics and offering guidance. Each party member's health is represented by the number of letters they have in their name. Additional letters can be added on to their names after leveling up to increase health.

The game's elements and mechanics are entirely reliant on typing. Players navigate, battle, and progress through the game by typing out a word describing an action or response. All four party members bear a sequence of letters below their name that, when discovered and typed, reward either a battle move or plot information, both unique to that party member. While in battle, learned moves are executed by whom they belong to. Winning a battle will yield one letter from the enemy's name. Moves may also be used outside of battle.

Puzzles are present throughout the environment in chests, skulls, and in other plot elements. Chests are opened by guessing their contents, and they provide multiple random letters that act as hints for what a party member's potential move or backstory may be. Living skulls pose riddles to the player – a correct answer will yield souls. Souls are stored inside of a "Soulstone" that belongs to the Cryptmaster. Souls are used as magic energy for certain moves such as healing.

The game also features "Whatever", an optional card game that can be played with any NPC. The turn-based game Whatever has players spell the names of cards to execute them.

=== Accessibility ===
Optionally, a push-to-talk option can be enabled, replacing the keyboard with voice input. This option is only on Windows 10 and greater and it requires a system setting to be enabled. Using voice control disables some minor gameplay elements and encounters. The combat pacing can also be changed from real-time to turn-based, to accommodate for controllers.

An option to show hints and make the puzzles easier is also available.

== Plot ==
Four heroes had battled a "great evil" but perished after. They awaken in a crypt, having been resurrected by the Cryptmaster, an eponymous necromancer. The Cryptmaster has the group ascend the crypt (which has since had multiple layers built atop it) so that he can break into the world of the living. As a result of being dead for so long, all four heroes have lost their memories and abilities; they regain their strength as the game progresses.

== Development ==
=== Conception ===
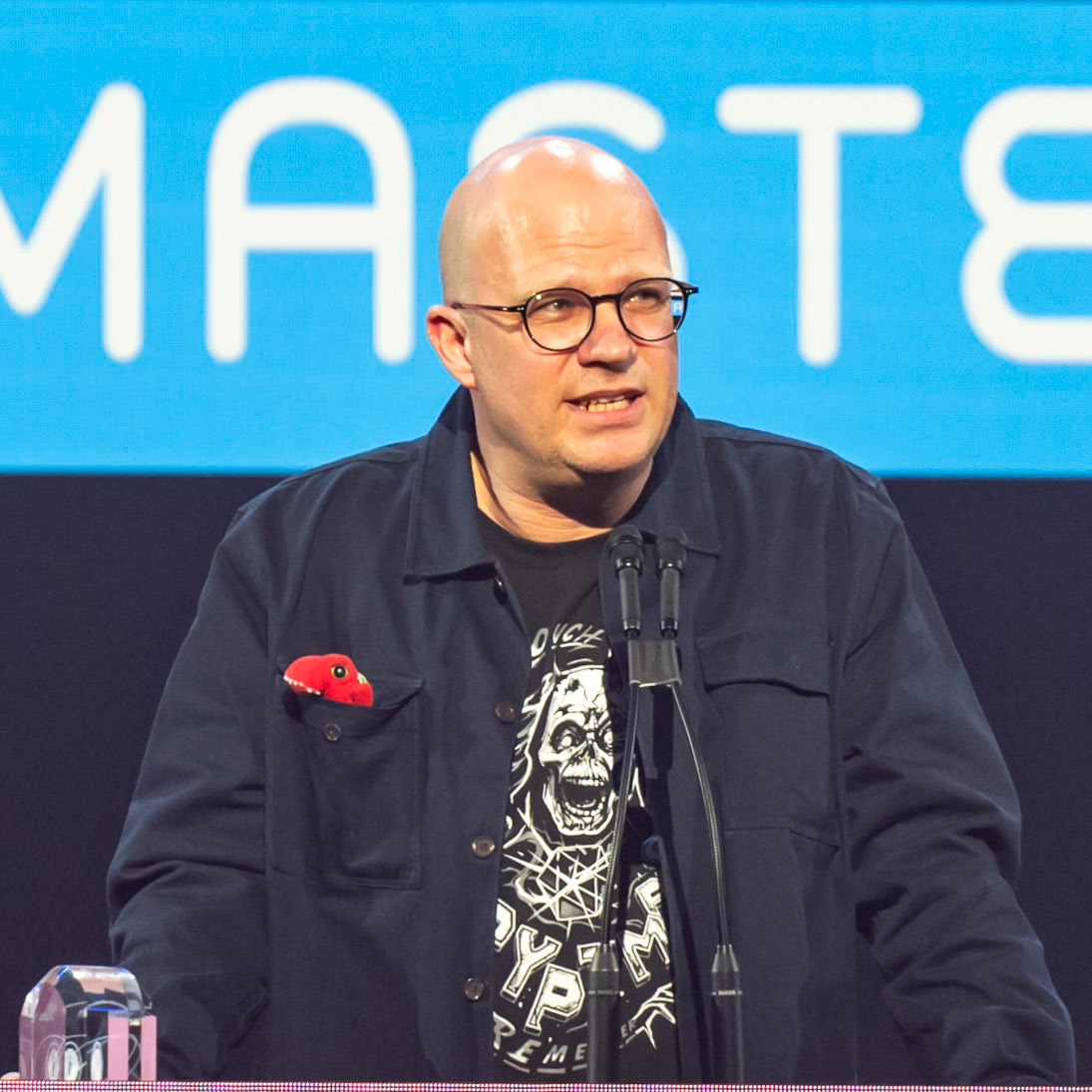
Lee Williams accepting his Independent Games Festival Award in 2024.

The game's development started when co-developer Lee Williams offered to write for free for a number of indie games. In 2014, Paul Hart accepted Williams's offer. Cryptmaster was created after many iterations of an idea in which words were the core gameplay mechanic. The duo state that the typing mechanic only became more of a focus because it was easier for players, and that originally, typing was not the intention.

=== Design ===
After deciding on the controls early, Williams and Hart worked on merging combat with typing. Initially, the first version gave players all skills at the start and attributes were upgraded as they played. The duo cite Hangman, Wordle, and Wheel of Fortune, as examples of games they drew inspiration from.

=== Dialogue ===
Cryptmaster features an extensive voice-recorded dictionary of words and phrases that are used to respond to the wide variety of words that players may enter. It also has a system for putting together and determining which lines to use. First, it checks for a unique response made for a specific word. Second, it checks in "pools" of word categories (verb, item, expletive). Lastly, it plays a default response. Williams says that he "recorded more or less a whole dictionary's worth of words".

== Reception ==
Reception

Aggregate scores
Aggregator	Score
Metacritic	77/100
OpenCritic	82% recommend

Review scores
Publication	Score
Hardcore Gamer	4/5
RPGFan	85
TouchArcade	4.5/5

Awards
Publication	Award
Independent Games Festival	Excellence in Design
IndieCade	Jury Prix Award

Cryptmaster received "generally favorable reviews" according to review aggregator website Metacritic, scoring a 77/100 on the site. Many critics praised its unique mechanics, humor, and art style. It has won the "Excellence in Design" award at the Independent Games Festival, and the "Jury Prix Award" at IndieCade.

The game's art style received particular praise. Alex McHugh of PCGamesN enjoyed the game art style and graphics, touting the monochrome graphics and weird enemies, saying players battle "with bizarre monsters, giant wobbling eyes peering at you out of doors, and much more to greet you on your journey."

Others noted the game's humor and jokes. Ars Technica's Kevin Purdy praised the game's humor and commented that "Cryptmaster ... seems like the worst possible game for people like me, and yet I dig it." Purdy and Mollie Taylor of PC Gamer noted how the Cryptmaster particularly responds to profanity. Jerry Williams of RPGFan praised the pacing and Cryptmaster character's humor and personality.

Mikhail Madnani, writing for TouchArcade, reviewed the game on a Steam Deck. He noted how despite the game's reliance on the keyboard, it does support using a controller. Noah Cochrane, in a review for GameTyrant, complimented the game's voice acting and sound design, noting the ambient music contributed to the atmosphere.

Slant was more negative, criticizing the repetition and lore. Aaron Riccolo said that, "Above all, Cryptmaster suffers from you having too many words to learn and there being far too few chapters in which to do so."
