= Dead Letter Dept. (video game) =

2025 indie horror video game

- Developers: Mike Monroe, Belief Engine
- Publisher: Belief Engine
- Composer: Mike Monroe
- Engine: Unity
- Platforms: Windows; Linux
- Release: 30 January 2025 (Steam)
- Genres: Psychological horror; Horror; Typing; Simulation
- Mode: Single-player

Dead Letter Dept. (stylized in uppercase) is a 2025 indie psychological horror typing game developed by Mike Monroe, and published by Belief Engine. It was released on Steam on January 30th 2025.

== Plot ==
The game revolves around the premise of the player having moved to a new city—the reasons as to why are decided by the player in the opening sequence in which they are writing a letter. The player obtains a temporary job doing data entry work for a firm outsourced by the Postal Service to handle interpreting undelivered mail of which whose address was not able to be successfully parsed by the Optical Character Recognition system.

The work consists of manually reviewing the undelivered mail and typing in what the system is unable to understand and wants to have processed, signaled by a yellow highlight. As the game progresses, the system begins to request the player type in additional prompts that are unrelated to address delivery—including sections from various postcards that range from vacation details, to ominous details about death and murder.

== Gameplay ==
The gameplay consists of two main modes - the first is the transversal from the player's home to their work, with the second being sat down and locked to a computer terminal typing in various texts.

In the transversal segment, the player can look around and inspect various items on their home. As they leave for work, the apartment complex they live in tends to shift and change in its visual and audio presentation.

In the typing segments, of which the majority of the game is played, they are prompted by the computer to view images of scanned mail and type in whatever is highlighted in yellow. Eventually it expands to more than just scanned mail, and becomes more puzzle-like in trying to figure out what is required to be typed in order to progress.

== Development ==
Developer Belief Engine is based in Redmond, Washington. The concept for the game was originally inspired by Belief Engine co-founder Scott McKie's part time job in college for the United States Post Office, in which he travelled to a distant warehouse in the middle of the night and sat in front of a computer that presented him mail that needed interpretation.

A demo was developed and released to be included on the HauntedPS1 Demo Disc series (Spectral Mall) compilation in August 2022. A revised version of the demo was released onto the Steam platform one month later.

== Reception ==
Reception

Review score
Publication	Score
Destructoid	8.5/10

Dead Letter Dept. received favorable reviews. VICE praised it saying "an incredible Indie Horror game that plays on the monotony of office work and what it means to be stuck in one place."
