= Die Gute Fabrik =

Danish video game developer

Die Gute Fabrik ApS
- Formerly: Copenhagen Game Productions ApS (2008–2011)
- Type: Private
- Industry: Video games
- Founded: 2008; 18 years ago
- Founder: Nils Deneken
- Headquarters: Copenhagen, Denmark
- Key people: Nils Deneken; Douglas Wilson; Christoffer Holmgård; Hannah Nicklin
- Products: Where Is My Heart?; Sportsfriends; Mutazione; Saltsea Chronicles
- Website: gutefabrik.com

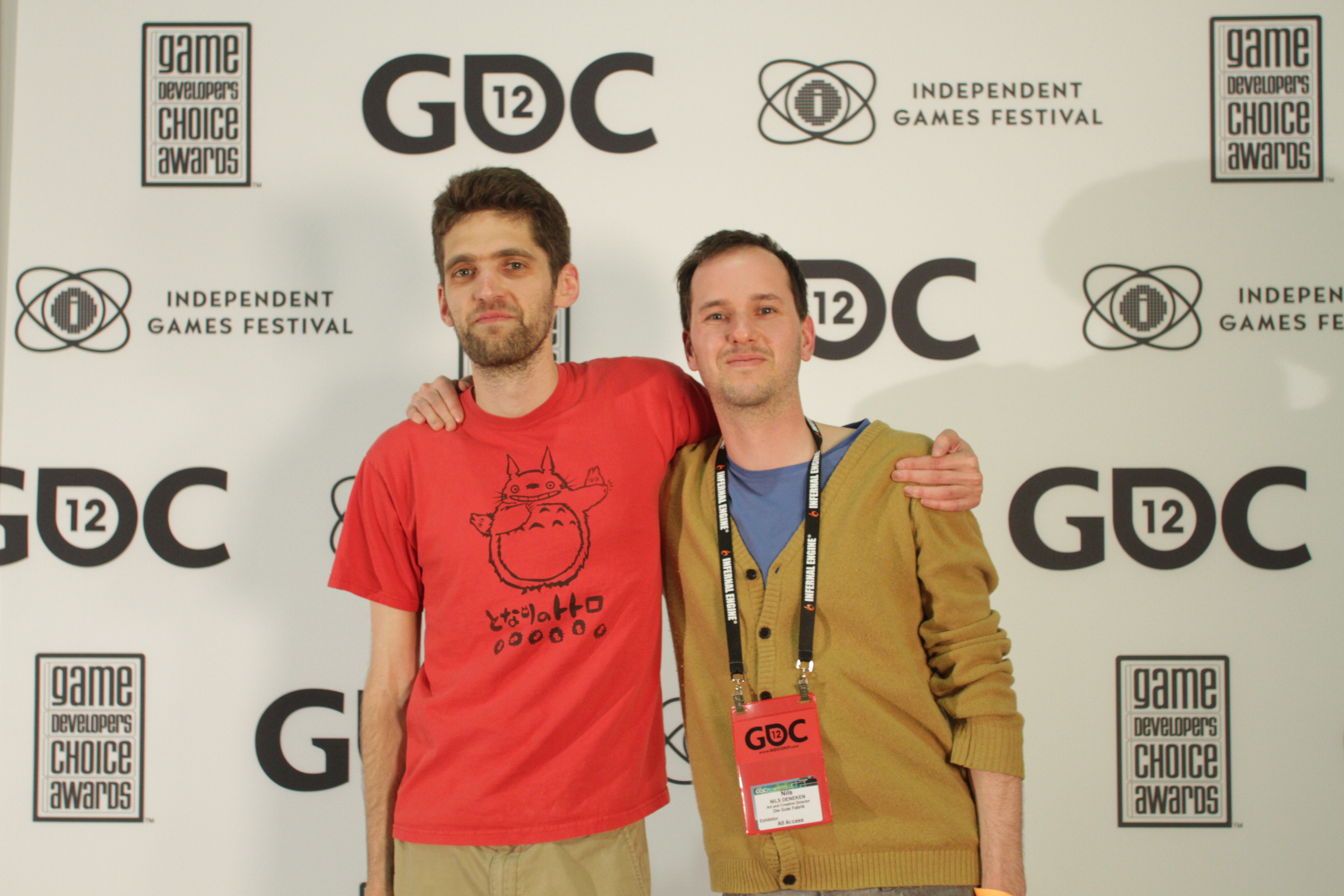
Douglas Wilson (left) and Nils Deneken of Die Gute Fabrik at the Game Developers Conference 2012

Die Gute Fabrik is an independent game developer based in Copenhagen, Denmark. Founded in 2008 by artist Nils Deneken, and joined by game designers Douglas Wilson and Christoffer Holmgård, the studio was afterwards led by writer Hannah Nicklin.

The company is best known for developing Where Is My Heart? and Johann Sebastian Joust, a game included in Sportsfriends, as well as Mutazione and Saltsea Chronicles.

In February 2024, the studio announced that they had "halted production" as they were unable to secure funding for their next project.

== Games developed ==
Year	Title	Platform(s)
2010	B.U.T.T.O.N.	Windows, Xbox 360
2011	Where Is My Heart?	macOS, Windows, Linux, PlayStation 3, PlayStation Portable
2013	Tower No Tumble	Sifteo Cubes
2014	Sportsfriends	macOS, Windows, Linux, PlayStation 3, PlayStation 4
2019	Mutazione	iOS, macOS, Windows, Linux, Switch, PlayStation 4, Xbox One, Atari VCS
2023	Saltsea Chronicles	macOS, Windows, Switch, PlayStation 5
