= Mutazione =

2019 video game

- Developer(s): Die Gute Fabrik
- Publisher(s): Akupara Games; Die Gute Fabrik (iOS)
- Director(s): Nils Deneken
- Artist(s): Leonardo D'Almeida
- Writer(s): Hannah Nicklin
- Composer(s): Alessandro Coronas
- Engine: Unity
- Platform(s): Linux; macOS; iOS; Microsoft Windows; PlayStation 4; Atari VCS; Nintendo Switch; Xbox One
- Release: Linux, macOS, iOS, Windows, PS4; September 19, 2019; Atari VCS; December 11, 2020; Switch, Xbox One; May 26, 2021
- Genre(s): Adventure
- Mode(s): Single-player

Mutazione is a 2019 adventure video game developed and published by Die Gute Fabrik. It launched for iOS through Apple Arcade as well as on Linux, Windows, macOS and PlayStation 4 by Akupara Games on September 19, 2019. It released on the Atari VCS on December 11, 2020. It was released on the Nintendo Switch and Xbox One on May 26, 2021. The game is set on an island where the player tends to the local gardens and learns more about the town's people.

== Gameplay ==
The player using the game's gardening feature

Mutazione is an adventure game, where the player walks around the different areas and interacts with the environment. The player plays as Kai, who goes to the island one summer in order to see her dying grandfather who lives there. The game takes place over different days within Kai's one week stay, styled as chapters, each with unique events. While in conversation, the player can choose different responses that will affect the discussion.

While gardening, the player can grow different types of plants, from bushes to trees. Seeds can be found all over the island from other plants. The player needs to give the plant the required space in order for it to grow and different ones require other types of soil. Each plant also creates different sounds which, when combined with other greenery, can create music.

== Development ==
The developers say that the ideas that started the game emerged over a decade ago when the creative director was sketching ideas in university. The game entered full production in around 2016. The developers cited the idea of a community and an in-depth world as things that inspired them. They said they wanted to make a game that rewarded meandering and respected the player's time. These ideas helped create Mutazione's "musical gardening."

The game was created in Unity, but most of the art and animation was done in Adobe Illustrator and Adobe Animate. Die Gute Fabrik also used custom tools for narrative design and music. They decided to focus it around a small town as it would reduce the amount of work needed, and that it would also help convey the ideas of community in a way they felt would not feel like a lecture to the player. The game's structure was inspired by soap operas, in that it focuses on ensemble storytelling.

== Reception ==
Reception

Aggregate score
Aggregator	Score
Metacritic	PS4: 76/100; PC: 80/100

Review scores
Publication	Score
Edge	7/10
Eurogamer	Eurogamer Recommended
IGN	7/10
PlayStation Official Magazine – UK	8/10

Mutazione received mostly positive reviews from critics, ending up with a Metacritic score of 76. Ana Diaz, writing for Polygon, praised the game's lack of pointless side quests and the game's gardening mechanics. The Verge's D. M. Moore enjoyed the character writing and the relaxing pacing of the game. Christian Donlan, writing for Eurogamer, liked the game's conversations and how the main area felt lived in. It was a finalist for the Seumas McNally Grand Prize at the 2020 Independent Game Festival, one of four nominations, winning for "Excellence in Audio".
