= Seeking Mavis Beacon =

2024 documentary film by Jazmin Renée Jones

- Film poster
- Directed by: Jazmin Jones
- Written by: Jazmin Jones
- Produced by: Guetty Felin
- Starring: Jazmin Jones; Olivia McKayla Ross
- Cinematography: Yeelen Cohen
- Edited by: Jon Fine; Jazmin Jones; Yeelen Cohen
- Music by: Fatima Al Qadiri
- Production companies: BelleMoon Productions; Neon; Field of Vision; Cinereach
- Distributed by: Neon
- Release dates: January 20, 2024 (Sundance); August 30, 2024 (United States)
- Running time: 102 minutes
- Country: United States
- Language: English
- Box office: $52,897

Seeking Mavis Beacon is a 2024 American documentary film directed by Jazmin Jones, which premiered at the Sundance Film Festival. The film is distributed by Neon and is Jones' directorial debut.

== Synopsis ==
Filmmaker Jazmin Jones and her collaborator, Olivia McKayla Ross, search for the real-life woman who served as the face of Mavis Beacon, the fictional instructor in the widely used typing software Mavis Beacon Teaches Typing.

The documentary begins by outlining the history of the software, which was first released in 1987 by The Software Toolworks. The filmmakers explore how Mavis Beacon became an iconic figure despite not being a real person. Through interviews with former employees and industry experts, they confirm that the character was portrayed by Renée L'Espérance, a Haitian-born model who was photographed for the software's cover but never credited or compensated beyond an initial payment.

Jones and Ross attempt to locate L'Espérance, traveling to various locations and speaking with individuals who may have known her. They uncover that she chose to disappear from public life after the software's success. Their search leads to archival footage and documents, but L'Espérance ultimately declines to participate in the documentary.

As their investigation concludes, the filmmakers acknowledge the limits of their search, recognizing that L'Espérance's absence remains a key part of the story. The documentary ends with reflections on Mavis Beacon's cultural impact, while leaving L'Espérance's fate unresolved.

The documentary was inspired by Cheryl Dunye's The Watermelon Woman, and Dunye moderated a panel following a screening of the film in Oakland.

== Cast ==
- Jazmin Renée Jones
- Olivia McKayla Ross

== Production ==
Seeking Mavis Beacon was produced by filmmaker Guetty Felin and Neon, in association with Field of Vision. The film was also associate produced by Olivia McKayla Ross.

== Release ==
The film premiered at the 2024 Sundance Film Festival in the NEXT category. The film was released by Neon on August 30, 2024.

=== Critical reception ===
Initial reception was generally positive. On the review aggregator website Rotten Tomatoes, 75% of 44 critics' reviews are positive, with an average rating of 6.2/10. The website's consensus reads: "Director Jazmin Jones' exploration of one of the internet's strangest cases occasionally lapses into self-indulgence, but the personalized approach ultimately yields a one-of-a-kind documentary experience." Metacritic calculated a weighted average of 72 out of 100 based on 12 critics, indicating "generally favorable" reviews.

Murtada Elfadl of Variety wrote that the "format-defying" documentary was "affecting and haunting," noting that the filmmaker explores "a range of philosophical and sociological considerations, from the notion of 'coded bias' to how they personally use technology to communicate and find community."
