= Cabernet (video game) =

2025 video game

- Developer: Party for Introverts
- Publisher: Akupara Games
- Producers: Enrique Otheo; Tanya Courtney
- Programmer: Arseniy Klishin
- Artist: Laura Gray
- Writers: Arseniy Klishin; Laura Gray
- Composer: Jim Fowler
- Platforms: Windows, PlayStation 4, PlayStation 5, Xbox One, Xbox Series X/S, Nintendo Switch
- Release: February 20, 2025
- Genre: Role-playing
- Mode: Single-player

Cabernet is a 2025 narrative role-playing video game developed by Party for Introverts, and published by Akupara Games. It was released for Microsoft Windows, Nintendo Switch, PlayStation 4, PlayStation 5, and Xbox Series S|X on February 20, 2025. The game is about vampires.

It has received positive reviews for its storytelling and voice acting. It has been nominated for many awards from GLAAD Media Awards, IGA Awards, and Horror Game Awards.

== Gameplay ==
Cabernet is a single-player narrative role-playing video game with multiple endings. Quests are based on interactions with the world and its characters, with exploration and conversations yielding experience points that can be used to level up skills, which in turn open up additional dialogue options. Rather than traditional combat stats, Liza has four knowledge-based attributes: Music and Arts, Literature and Writing, Science and Logic, and History and Politics, which grant her different options in dialogue when speaking with townsfolk. Base stats are chosen during Liza's funeral in the prologue, and can be further raised throughout the game by reading books, wearing different outfits, and completing quests. Completing enough quests levels Liza up within vampiric society, at which point the player can increase her stat pools.

Each night, the player is given Action Points, which are spent on quests, conversations, and other activities as time advances through predetermined increments till dawn. Once all action points are used, embers begin to fleck off of Liza, indicating that sunrise is imminent and she must return to her coffin. Liza only has a limited amount of time per night to complete tasks, some of which take up more time than others, requiring the player to carefully plan and schedule. The game is navigated through side-scrolling environments using standard keyboard controls, with full gamepad support. Liza has four vampiric abilities: turning into a bat, turning invisible, enchanting people, and entering a vampire form to drink blood, accessed through an ability wheel that can be opened at any time outside of dialogue.

Liza's health is indicated by a blood chalice, which drains each night. To feed, the player can purchase bottled Cabernet "wine", hunt rabbits in the nearby forest, or drink from human characters they have built a close enough relationship with to enchant. Victims are not directly aware of what has happened, but at some level retain the sensation, causing their friendship level with Liza to drop with each feeding. Drinking more blood than necessary grants temporary powers, but increases Liza's rate of dependency going forward.

Player choices feed into a morality system tracking Liza's alignment between Humanity and Nihilism, with further dialogue options opening up depending on how far in either direction she leans. Characters can die permanently as a consequence of player decisions, which can significantly alter how story events unfold.

== Plot ==
Cabernet begins with protagonist Liza's funeral, where her uncles gives a eulogy determining the direction of Liza's life and which skills she specializes in. The story then shifts to Liza as she awakes in a dungeon. Unsure of how she got there, Liza makes a pact with an unseen and silent presence for freedom, before finding herself at a party filled with vampires. It quickly becomes apparent that she is now a vampire as well, and that her new life comes with a ton of rules, like needing to satiate a constant thirst for blood and staying away from sunlight. But there are immense freedoms associated with the transformation as well, as Liza is empowered with supernatural abilities that allow her to go to places she never could before, get away with acts others are often swiftly arrested for, and pursue passions and love most mortals of her station cannot yet readily do.

== Reception ==
Reception

Aggregate scores
| Aggregator | Score |
|---|---|
| Metacritic | (PC) 88/100 |
| OpenCritic | 92% recommend |

Review score
| Publication | Score |
|---|---|
| GameSpot | 9/10 |

The PC version of Cabernet received generally favorable reviews from critics, according to the review aggregator website Metacritic. Fellow review aggregator OpenCritic assessed that the game received strong approval, being recommended by 92% of critics. Many critics praised its unique narrative, voice acting, and game design balancing between nihilism and humanity, although some critics expressed frustration with present glitches and performance issues on consoles such as the Nintendo Switch.

The game has been nominated for multiple awards such as "Best Score & Music" at the 2025 Horror Game Awards, "Outstanding Video Game" at the 2025 GLAAD Media Awards, and many others. Co-developer Laura Gray won the award for "Creative Impact" at the 2025 MCV/Develop Women in Games Awards for her work on Cabernet.
