= Your Computer (Australian magazine) =

- Partial cover from December 1992
- Editor: Les Bell
- Editor: Jake Kennedy
- Editor: Mat Wheelen
- Categories: Home computing
- Frequency: Monthly
- Founded: 1981
- Final issue Number: 1997; May/June 1997
- Company: White House Publishing Group
- Country: Australia
- Based in: Waterloo, New South Wales
- Language: English
- ISSN: 0725-3931

Your Computer was an Australian computer magazine published by the White House Publishing Group (under licence from Motorword Pty Ltd.) and printed by The Lithgo Centre, Waterloo. Starting with the very first issue in May/June 1981 (102 pages) (with a limited print run of 30,000) at the recommended price of $2.00. Around 1985 the magazine was later published by Federal Publishing Company (Hannanprint Group) and printed by Macquarie Print. The monthly magazine's final issue was May/June 1997. The first editor of the magazine was Les Bell.

The articles in Your Computer catered for beginners to computing, through to highly technical programming techniques, industry updates, resources, user group and microcomputer-specific columns, and published many special features of Australian technology companies. Articles were written by both full-time magazine staff and freelance contributors, including Les Bell, Matt Whalen, Bill Bolton, Stewart White and Lloyd Borrett. Cartoonist Brendan J Ackhurst was also a frequent contributor of illustrations to the magazine. For many years, the magazine was focused on home computers such as the Commodore 64, Apple II, MicroBee and many others. It never specialized on any one market, and so catered for hobbyists, serious hobbyists, and professionals, and remained platform agnostic.
