= Mavis Beacon Teaches Typing =

Software designed to teach touch typing

- 1987 box art
- Original authors: Norm Worthington, Walt Bilofsky, Mike Duffy
- Developer: The Software Toolworks
- Release: Late 1987; 39 years ago
- Stable release: 20
- Operating system: macOS, Windows
- Platform: cross-platform
- License: Proprietary
- Website: mavisbeacon.com, mackiev.com

Mavis Beacon Teaches Typing is an application software program designed to teach touch typing. Released in late 1987 by The Software Toolworks, the program aimed to enhance users' typing skills through a series of interactive lessons and games.

Mavis Beacon is an entirely fictional character created for marketing purposes.

== History ==
=== Background ===
Founded by Les Crane, Walt Bilofsky, and Mike Duffy, The Software Toolworks became widely known for developing Chessmaster 2000, a popular chess simulator. Norm Worthington and Mike Duffy also contributed significantly to the development of the program.

The character Mavis Beacon, famously associated with teaching typing, was originally portrayed by Haitian-born model Renee L'Esperance. The name "Mavis" was inspired by Mavis Staples, the lead vocalist of The Staple Singers, while the surname "Beacon" was selected for its connotation of guidance and light. Les Crane, a former talk-show host and an early partner in The Software Toolworks, played an integral role in creating the persona of Mavis Beacon.

=== Development ===
The program's early versions supported both the traditional QWERTY keyboard layout and the alternative Dvorak Simplified Keyboard layout.

A typing game in Mavis Beacon featuring car racing (Windows version)

Since its initial release in 1987, Mavis Beacon Teaches Typing has undergone numerous iterations. The 2011 Ultimate Mac Edition by Software MacKiev introduced two-player competitive typing network games, integration with iTunes, Dvorak keyboard support, practice typing song lyrics, RSS news feeds, and classic novels. In 2021, Encore, Inc. released Mavis Beacon Teaches Typing 2020.

=== Sales ===
In 1999, the series had sold over six million copies. In 2000, two products from the franchise were on the Top Selling Educational Software list. Mavis Beacon Teaches Typing 10.0 was in the fourth position, and Mavis Beacon Teaches Typing 5.0 was ranked eighth.

Distributions of the software include MS-DOS, Apple II, Commodore 64, Apple IIGS, Atari ST, Mac, Microsoft Windows, Palm OS, and Amiga.

=== Documentary ===
In 2024, a documentary titled Seeking Mavis Beacon premiered at the Sundance Film Festival, which investigates the origin of Mavis Beacon. The creators of the film discovered that the image of a corporate-attired Black woman on the software packaging was not of someone named Mavis Beacon, but rather a Haitian model named Renee L'Esperance. She was paid $500 for posing for the marketing photo, wasn't involved in the development or the sales of the software, and did not share in any of the presumably significant profits generated by the product. L'Esperance herself neither appears in nor is directly quoted in the documentary.

== Gameplay ==
Users can find themselves racing a virtual car by accurately typing words that appear on the screen. The program also includes typing drills that present users with passages of text to type out, which provides a comprehensive overview of their progress. Successful completion of lessons and tests can result in the achievement of certificates.

== Reception ==
The New York Times technology writer Peter Lewis noted its potential to improve typing skills in 1987. Compute! magazine's review in 1989 supports the Dvorak Simplified Keyboard.

Amiga Format's Paul Tyrrell praised its user-friendly design. Nick Veitch of CU Amiga noted that the program was more interesting than traditional educational packages. Mavis Beacon Teaches Typing Version 5 was described as a "well-polished program" by Superkids. AllGame reviewed Deluxe Version 11 and gave it a rating of 3.5 out of 5. They wrote that it "provides fun and challenge for typists of all abilities".

== Legacy ==
Minigames in the Mavis Beacon series are credited with being some of the progenitors of the typing game genre of video games, typically inventive, low-budget indie games. While these games are often still assumed to be educational in nature, many of them go beyond being educational games in order to fully utilize typing as a control method.

== See also ==
- Ratatype
- Seeking Mavis Beacon (2024 documentary film about Mavis Beacon)
- Typequick
- TypeRacer
