= Nuovo Award =

The Nuovo Award or Innovation Award is an award given at the Independent Games Festival (IGF), an annual event that takes place during the Game Developers Conference, one of the largest gatherings of the indie video game industry. The award is given to honor "abstract, shortform, and unconventional game development which advances the medium and the way we think about games". The award was designed as a way for art games to compete with traditional indie games, and the winner was originally selected from a group of finalists and given a prize of US$2,500. In 2011, the IGF increased the prize money to US$5,000 due to the increased quality of the entries.

The former IGF chairman Brandon Boyer described the Nuovo finalists as experimental games that attempted to distinguish themselves from established conventions, and would not fit in any of the other IGF award categories. Nominations for the award are made by the IGF's judges. Eight finalists are chosen by an elected jury from among the nominees and a few others are given honorable mentions if they receive insufficient votes to become finalists. The winner is decided from among the finalists by jury voting. Jury members include notable game developers and previous winners and finalists, including individuals such as Jennifer Schneidereit, Jason Rohrer, Paolo Pedercini, Ian Bogost, and Daniel Benmergui. In the seventeen years since the award's debut, 119 games have been nominated as finalists, while 97 games have been chosen as honorable mentions. Eighteen games have won the award, the first being the platformer Between (2009), while the latest to be awarded is Horses (2026).

== Recipients ==
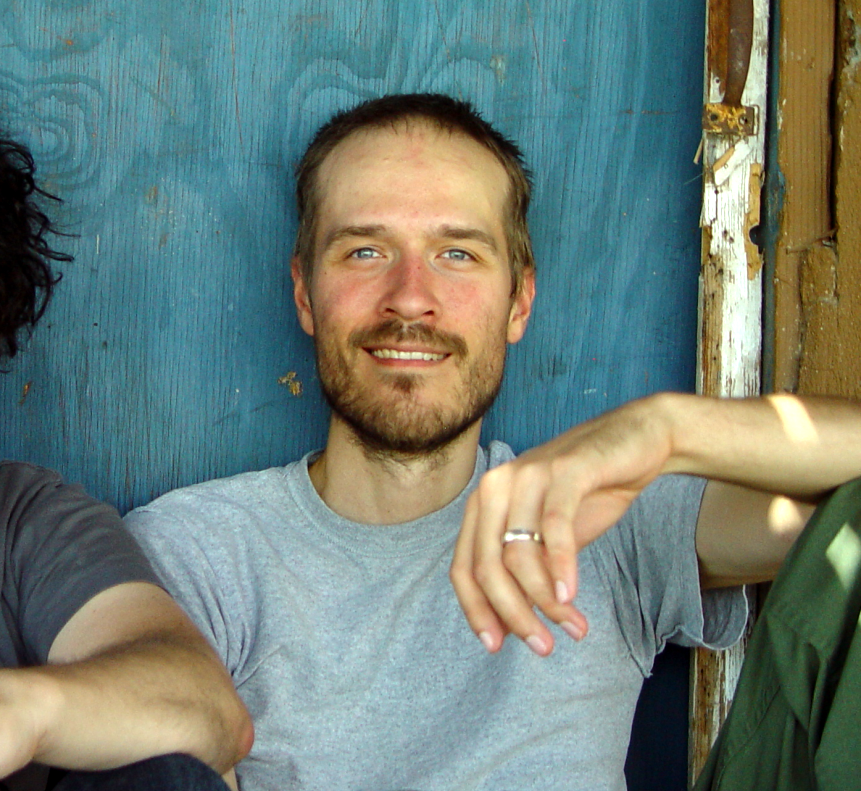
Jason Rohrer won for Between (2009).

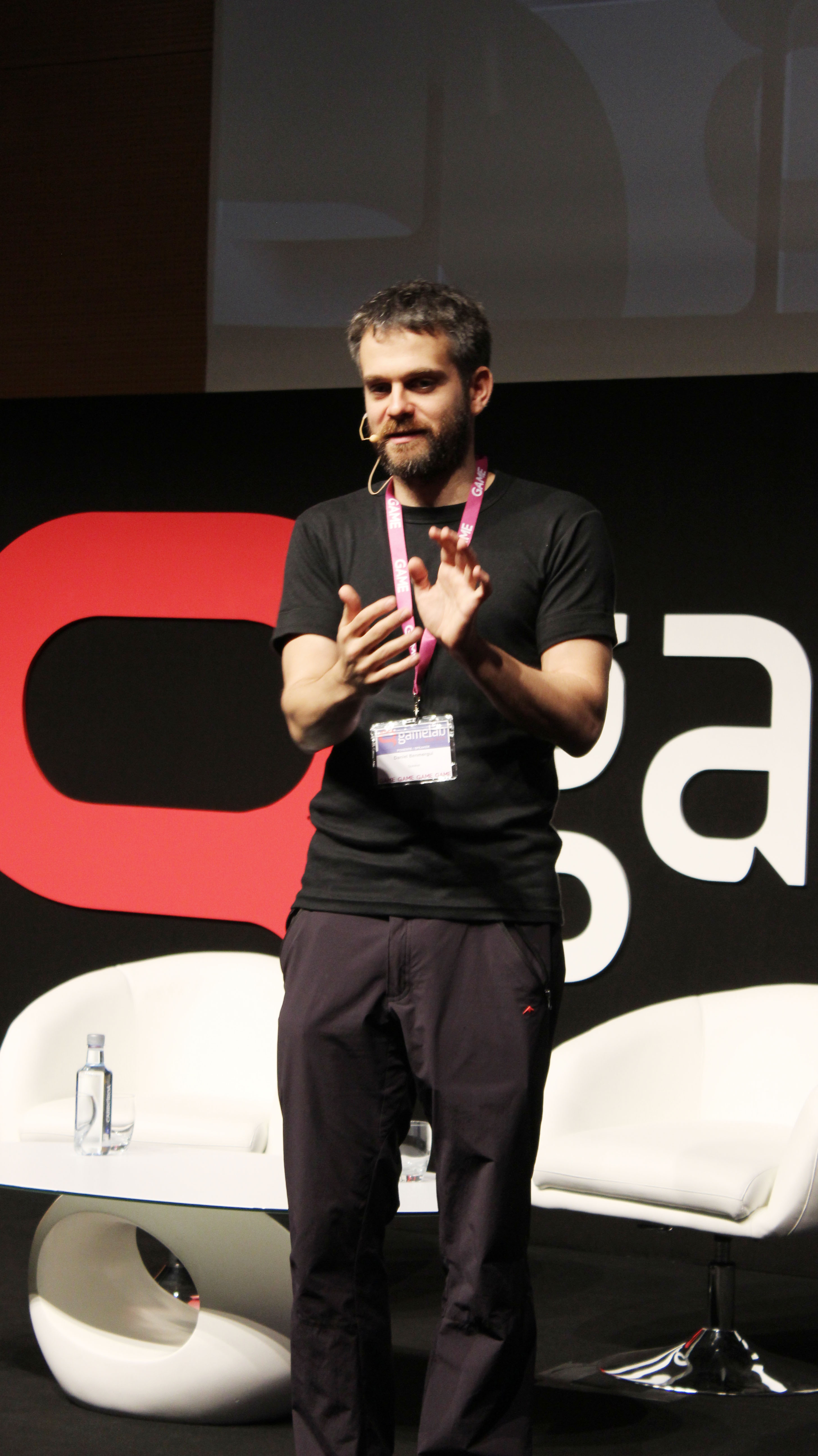
Daniel Benmergui won for Storyteller (2012).

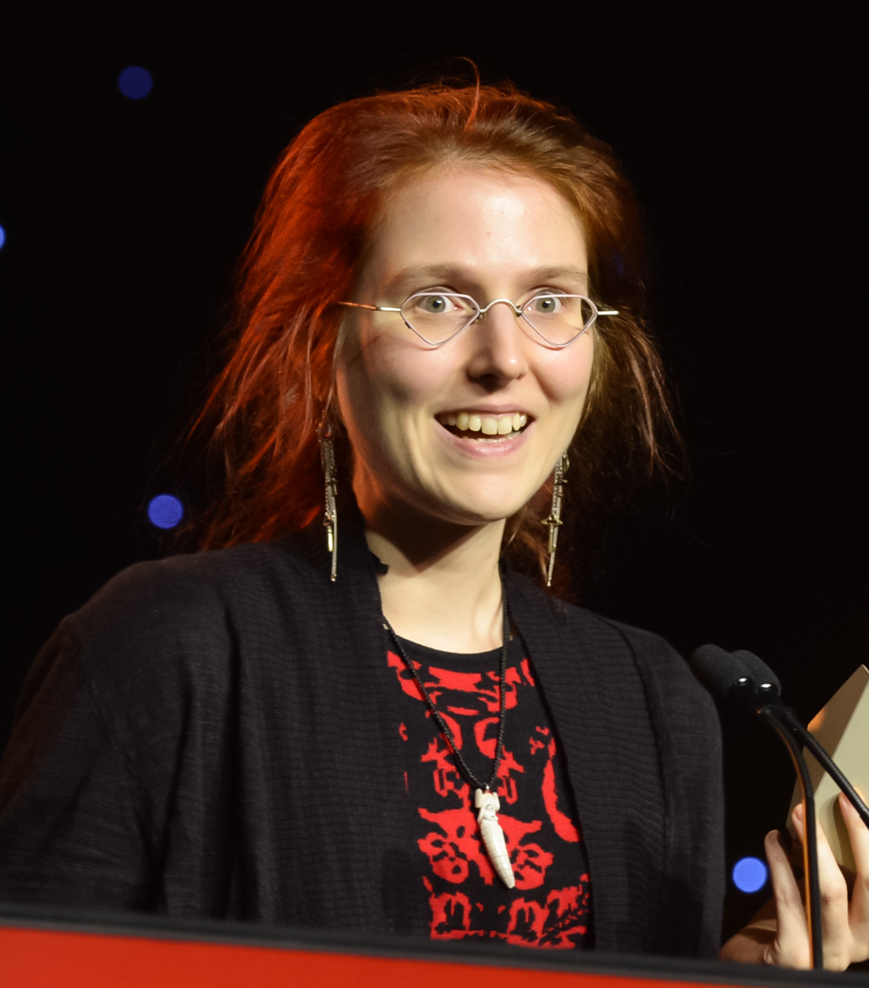
Nathalie Lawhead won for Tetrageddon Games (2015).

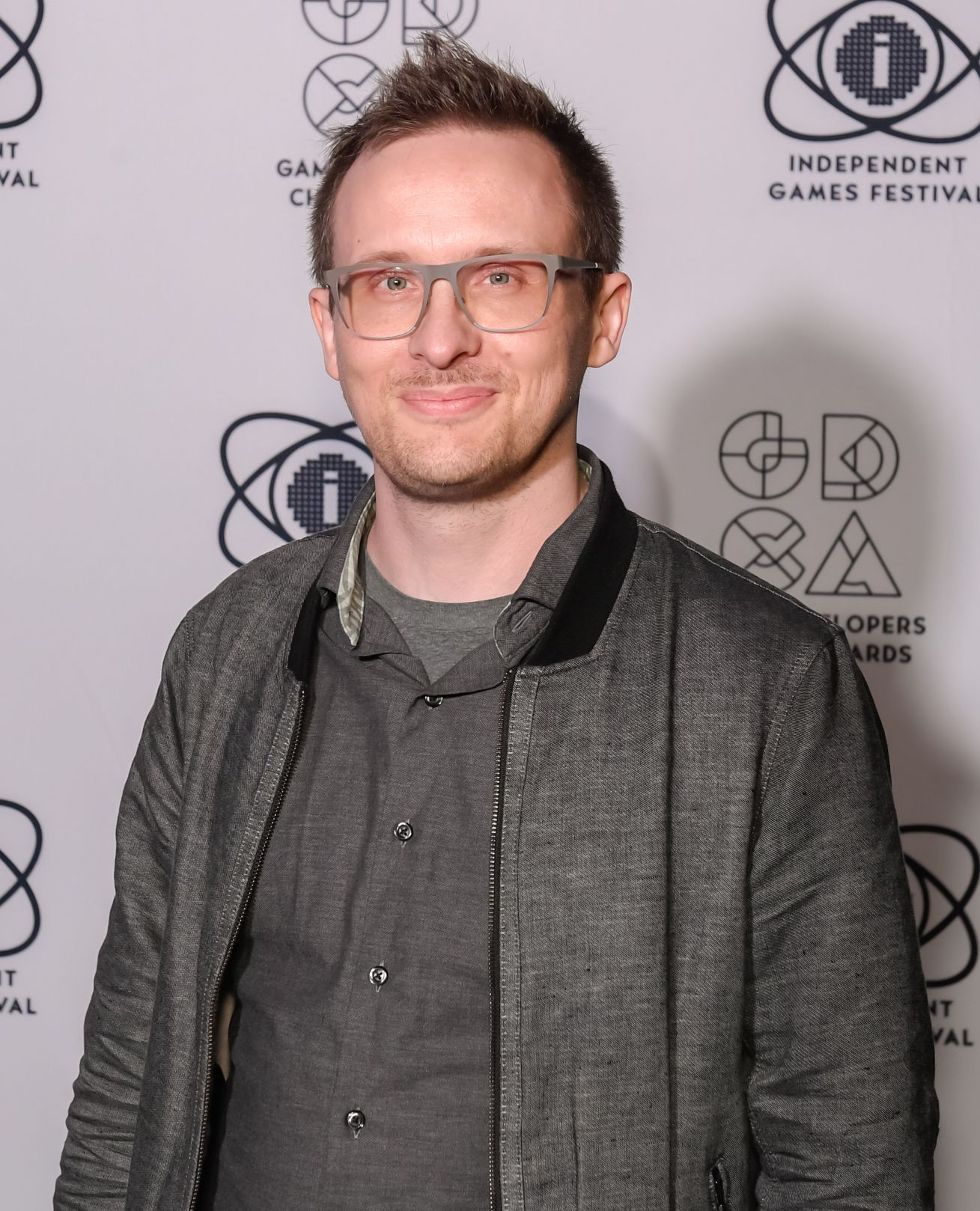
Bennett Foddy won for Getting Over It with Bennett Foddy (2018).

Recipients
Year	Winner	Developer	Finalists (Note: From 2009 to 2010, there were five finalists instead of eight.)	Honorable mentions (Note: Honorable mentions were introduced in 2011.)	Ref.
2009	Between	Jason Rohrer	Coil; Mightier; The Graveyard; You Have To Burn The Rope	—N/a	
2010	Tuning	Cactus	A Slow Year; Closure; Enviro-Bear 2000; Today I Die	—N/a	
2011	Nidhogg	Messhof	Bohm; Brutally Unfair Tactics Totally OK Now; The Cat and the Coup; Dinner Date; Hazard: The Journey Of Life; A House In California; Loop Raccord	Amnesia: The Dark Descent; Choice of Broadsides; Faraway; Feign; Spy Party	
2012	Storyteller	Daniel Benmergui	At a Distance; Dear Esther; Fingle; GIRP; Johann Sebastian Joust; Proteus; WAY	Deep Sea; Four Letter Word; GlitchHiker; Hundreds; POP	
2013	Cart Life	Richard Hofmeier	7 Grand Steps; Bientôt l’Été; Dys4ia; Little Inferno; MirrorMoon; Spaceteam; VESPER.5	Frog Fractions; Renga; Starseed Pilgrim; The Stanley Parable; Thirty Flights of Loving	
2014	Luxuria Superbia	Tale of Tales	Corrypt; Dominique Pamplemousse in "It's All Over Once the Fat Lady Sings!"; Extrasolar; Papers, Please; Perfect Woman; Save the Date; SoundSelf	18 Cadence; Device 6; Elegy for a Dead World; Shelter; Superhot	
2015	Tetrageddon Games	Nathalie Lawhead	Become A Great Artist In Just 10 Seconds; Bounden; Desert Golfing; Elegy for a Dead World; How Do You Do It?; Plug & Play; Rooftop Cop	Curtain; Ice-Bound: A Novel of Reconfiguration; International Jetpack Conference; Outer Wilds; Phonopath; Push Me Pull You	
2016	Cibele	Star Maid Games	Fantastic Contraption; Her Story; Keep Talking and Nobody Explodes; Orchids to Dusk; Panoramical; Progress; The Beginner's Guide	Affordable Space Adventures; Enough; Future Unfolding; Sage Solitaire; Sentree; TIS-100; Vignettes	
2017	Oiκοςpiel, Book I	David Kanaga	Islands: Non-Places; Close; Diaries of a Spaceport Janitor; Everything; Virginia; Mu Cartographer; Lieve Oma	Memoir En Code: Reissue; Far from Noise; Ladykiller in a Bind; Witchball; Project Perfect Citizen; Wheels of Aurelia; Quadrilateral Cowboy	
2018	Getting Over It with Bennett Foddy	Bennett Foddy	Tarotica Voo Doo; 10 Mississippi; A Mortician's Tale; Cosmic Top Secret; Everything Is Going to Be OK; Baba Is You; Kids	Where the Water Tastes Like Wine; IO Interloper; The Norwood Suite; Cheap Golf; Witchball; Million Onion Hotel	
2019	Black Room	Cassie McQuarter	Circle0; Do Not Feed The Monkeys; eCheese Zone; Mirror Drop; Noita; Nth Dimensional Hiking; Paratopic	All Our Asias; Cyberpet Graveyard; Hypnospace Outlaw; Levedad; Macdows 95; Nerve Damage; Subserial Network; The Norwood Suite	
2020	The Space Between	Christoph Frey	Tales From Off-Peak City Vol. 1; Infini; Life Tastes Like Cardboard; Promesa; Song of Bloom; The Longing; Pagan: Autogeny	Astrologaster; Elsinore; Fit for a King; My Exercise; Where the Bees Make Honey; Smile For Me	
2021	Blaseball	The Game Band	Nightmare Temptation Academy; That Night, Steeped by Blood River; Airplane Mode; Welcome to Elk; Umurangi Generation; Chasing Light; Kristallijn	Cai Cai Balão; Genesis Noir; Gnosia; Liquidators; Night Dreams; Rainy Season; Stilstand; There Is No Game: Wrong Dimension	
2022	Memory Card	Lily Zone	Okthryssia and Saturnia's Bureaucratic Adventures; Space Hole 2020; Tux and Fanny; Cruelty Squad; Sparkles & Gems; Fuzz Dungeon; Cuccchi	Last Call; The Shape of Time; The Under Presents; Song of Homunculus; Card Shark; The Vale: Shadow of the Crown	
2023	Betrayal at Club Low	Cosmo D Studios	Afterglitch; An Outcry; He Fucked the Girl Out of Me; Queer Man Peering Into a Rockpool.jpg; Sylvie Lime; Time Bandit; Titanic II: Orchestra for Dying At Sea	Atuel; Ib; Not For Broadcast; Of Moons and Mania; RPG Time: The Legend of Wright	
2024	Anthology of the Killer	thecatamites, Tommy Tone, A. Degen	1000xRESIST; Cryptmaster; Kevin (1997-2077); Mediterranea Inferno; Nidus; The Forest Cathedral	BlueSuburbia; goodbye.monster; In Stars and Time; Nour: Play with Your Food; The Cosmic Wheel Sisterhood	
2025	Consume Me	Jenny Jiao Hsia, AP Thomson, Jie En Lee, Violet W-P, Ken "coda" Snyder	Despelote; Extreme Evolution: Drive to Divinity; Ginger; Individualism in the Dead-Internet Age: an Anti-Big Tech Asset Flip Shovelware Manifesto; Starship Home; Tapeçaria; The Exit 8	Arctic Eggs; Judero; Onto Maizilind Unto Infinity; Price of Flight; Project_Y: Working Title; Refind Self: The Personality Test Game	
2026	Horses	Andrea Lucco Borlera	Baby Steps; Blippo+; Mini Mini Golf Golf; Plum Road Tea Dream; Titanium Court; kevin’s PLAYING in berlin; Wednesdays	The End of Gameplay; No Players Online; The House Dreams Along With Them; Type Help; _ΩMEGA_POINT; Dreamcore; Threshold	
