= Betrayal at Club Low =

- Developer: Cosmo D
- Publisher: Cosmo D
- Designer: Greg Heffernan
- Programmer: Greg Heffernan
- Artist: Greg Heffernan
- Composer: Greg Heffernan
- Engine: Unity
- Platforms: Linux; macOS; Windows
- Release: September 9, 2022
- Genre: Role-playing
- Mode: Single-player

Betrayal at Club Low is a 2022 role-playing video game developed and published by Cosmo D. It is set in the same world as Off-Peak, The Norwood Suite, and Tales From Off-Peak City Vol. 1.

== Gameplay ==
Players sent to Club Low to rescue a compatriot being held there. Unlike Cosmo D's previous games, which were first-person adventure games, Betrayal at Club Low is a role-playing game played from a third-person view. Characters have seven skills: cooking, deception, music, observation, physique, wisdom, and wit. To succeed at tasks, players roll dice based on their skills. They can improve their chances by buying skill increases and finding pizza recipes, which unlock bonus "pizza dice". Various bonuses and penalties can affect the chances of success, both for the player and their opponent. For example, convincing a DJ that his mother is in the audience can make subsequent challenges easier. The effects of previous decisions can carry forward, granting large bonuses toward the completion of complex and difficult tasks. All the details about dice rolls are openly presented, and players can choose to put them off until they are better prepared. Dice can be optionally rerolled up to twice. There are eleven endings.

== Development ==
Greg Heffernan developed the game himself under the name Cosmo D. In the past, Heffernan had made several games combining elements of walking sims and adventure games. As a longtime fan of role-playing games, he wanted to make a more mechanics-heavy game. Betrayal at Club Low was released on September 9, 2022.

== Reception ==
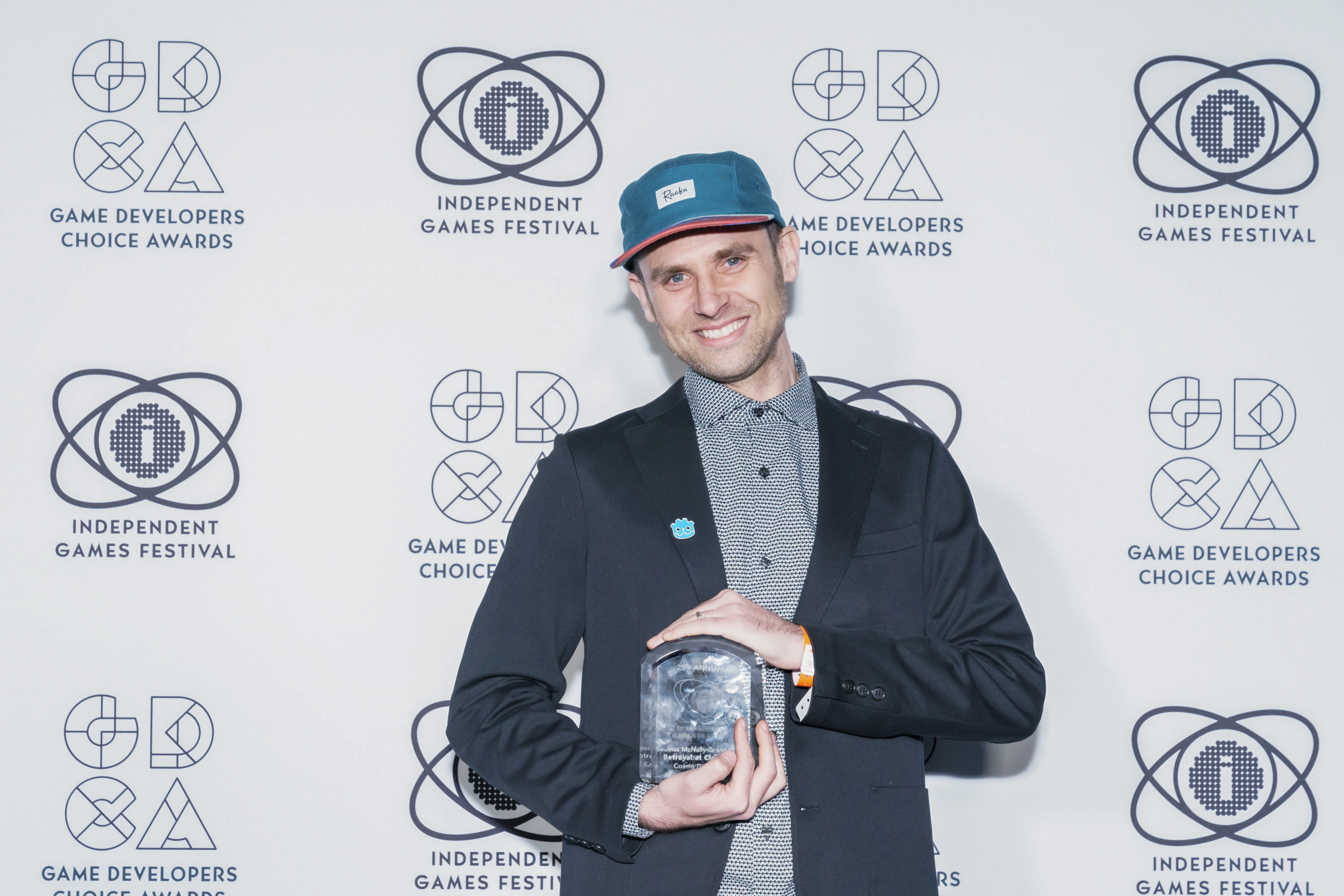
Cosmo D won the Seumas McNally grand prize at the 2023 Independent Games Festival

Betrayal At Club Low received positive reviews, according to review aggregator Metacritic. Rock Paper Shotgun called it "an honest-to-goodness RPG" with very fun dice mechanics and said it boils down the best parts of role-playing games into a short, surreal adventure. Commenting on the game's replayability, Slant Magazine said "going through the same motions hardly dulls the sheen of Cosmo D's latest clever and wholly invigorating gaming experiment". Eurogamer praised the game's ability to craft relatable situations and tell interesting stories about the people working at the nightclub. Adventure Gamers praised the game's replayability and 3D environment, but they said the randomness inherent in dice rolling may frustrate some gamers. GameSpot praised the use of dice in dialogue, which their reviewer found to give more depth than in traditional role-playing systems.

Writing for PC Gamer, Alexis Ong identified Betrayal at Club Low as one of her favorite adventure games of 2022 and, in a roundup of the best of games of 2022 for Eurogamer, called it "a luxurious escape from a reality defined by economic speculations and predictions". Rock Paper Shotgun selected it as one of the best games of 2022. At the Independent Games Festival, it won the Seumas McNally Grand Prize and the Nuovo Award, and it was nominated for Excellence In Design.
