= Save the Date =

Save the Date may refer to:

- Save the Date (film), a 2012 film
- Save the Date (video game), a 2013 video game
- "Save the Date" (The Loud House), a 2016 television episode
- "Save the Date" (The Thundermans: Undercover), a 2025 television episode
- Save the Date (TV series), a 2024 Israeli TV series

== See also ==
- Save the Day (disambiguation)
