= Nour: Play with Your Food =

2023 video game

Nour: Play With Your Food
- Developer: Terrifying Jellyfish
- Publisher: Panic Inc.
- Platforms: Windows; Macintosh; Nintendo Switch; PlayStation 4; PlayStation 5
- Release: Windows, Mac, PlayStation: WW: 12 September 2023; Switch: WW: 29 August 2024; AU: 30 August 2024
- Mode: Single-player

Nour: Play With Your Food is a 2023 video game created by independent developer Terrifying Jellyfish and published by Panic Inc. The game received average reviews from critics, and was nominated for the Excellence in Audio award at the Independent Games Festival.

== Development ==
Nour was developed by Terrifying Jellyfish, the studio of St. Louis, Missouri-based developer TJ Hughes. The game was in development from 2017, and supported with a Kickstarter campaign in that year.

== Reception ==
Reception

Review scores
Publication	Score
Push Square	6/10
TouchArcade	3.5/5
Multiplayer.it	5/10
PlayStation Universe	6/10

Nour received average reviews from critics. Game designer Nina Freeman named the demo as one the best games of 2018, and Jesse Vitelli of Giant Bomb named the game as one of the best of 2023. PC Magazine named the title as one of the best games for the Switch Lite.

Nour was nominated for the Excellence in Audio award at the 2024 Independent Games Festival, and received an Honorable Mention for the Nuovo Award.
