= All Our Asias =

2018 video game

- Developer: Analgesic Productions
- Platforms: Windows, Mac, Linux
- Release: 7 February 2018
- Genre: Adventure
- Mode: Single-player

All Our Asias is a 2018 video game developed and published by Analgesic Productions, the independent studio of Tokyo-based developer Melos Han-Tani. The game is a semi-autobiographic narrative adventure game in which players assume the role of Yuito, a Japanese-American man who uses a virtual reality system to simulate the memories of his dying father. Han-Tani stated that the game's focus was to explore the idea of belonging in the Asian diaspora community. Following release, the game received positive reception for its nuanced narrative and visual presentation, and won an Honorable Mention for the Nuovo Award at the 2019 Independent Games Festival.

== Plot ==
The developer, Melos Han-Tani, introduces themselves at the start of the game and explains the purpose of the game is to explore questions around Asian identity and common qualities to the Asian diaspora. The game is played from the perspective of Yuito, a Japanese-American hedge fund manager who enters a virtual reality system using technology named Memory World Visitation. The virtual reality allows Yuito a limited time to explore a reconstruction of the memories of his estranged dying father, who has become unable to talk. In the Memory World, Yuito is able to talk to people in his father's memories to learn about him. In the later stages of the game, set in a simulated Chicago, Yuito meets a figure called the General, who promises to share information about his father. The General challenges Yuito's attempts to identify with his father and the Asian diaspora characters he meets throughout the game. Yuito, who considers himself Asian and identifies closely with others who share the same label despite having a different class background, is confronted with understanding what it means to be part of the Asian community beyond the notion of shared heritage.

== Development and release ==
All Our Asias was created by Analgesic Productions, the studio of Melos Han-Tani. Han-Tani is a Tokyo based game developer, composer and programmer, formerly a game design and music lecturer at the School of the Art Institute of Chicago. Han-Tani stated the project was made with the aim of telling a "rich" and "thematically" dense narrative within the medium of the game, citing games such as Kentucky Route Zero for inspiration. The game was written as indirectly autobiographical and based on Han-Tani's past experiences living in Chicago, with the game's protagonist based on an imagination of a "future projection" of Han-Tani had they taken a different direction at a previous point in their life. Han-Tani stated their process was to focus on a "few familiar topics", including "race consciousness", "masculinity", and "complicating the notion of Asian America", and "minimize them" by focusing on the experiences of a single character. The game was released for free on Steam and itch.io.

== Reception ==
Several critics cited All Our Asias as one of the best games of the year, including developer Nina Freeman, writing for Giant Bomb, and Danielle Riendeau of Vice. All Our Asias also received an Honorable Mention for the Nuovo Award at the 2019 Independent Games Festival.

Describing the game as "thought-provoking" and involving "emotionally complex storytelling", Allegra Frank of Polygon considered the game was able to transcend its "odd premise" and resonated with is depiction of second-generation immigrants navigating the "big gulf" in how they relate to their parents. Julie Muncy of Wired stated that Han-Tani's self-inclusion in the game lent the game a "personal" tone and "quiet insistence" that demonstrated the "power games can have when artists take responsibility for their creation". Stating the game as "one of the most beautiful game's played in recent memory", Patricia Hernandez of Kotaku focused praise on the game's style and artistic direction, comparing it to the PlayStation 2 title Shin Megami Tensei III: Nocturne and stating that "by leaving out unnecessary details, the player has to interpret everything they see, making the game feel more personal somehow". Yussef Cole of Unwinnable, found the game's message resonant and powerful, stating that their experience with the game, as with Yuito's with his father, encouraged "finding new closeness with our families and our communities, and better understanding our place within them".
