= Dinner Date (disambiguation) =

Dinner Date is a British dating game show.

Dinner Date may also refer to:

- Dinner Date (American TV series), a musical variety show
- Dinner Date (video game)
- "Dinner Date" (Robin's Nest), a 1978 television episode

== See also ==
- A Dinner Date, a 1981 Egyptian film
- "The Dinner Date", an episode of The Curious Creations of Christine McConnell
- Lunch Date, a Philippine television variety show
- The Lunch Date, a 1989 American short film
