= How Do You Do It? (video game) =

2014 video game

- Steam cover art
- Developers: Nina Freeman, Emmett Butler
- Artist: Jonathan Kittaka
- Composer: Deckman Coss
- Platform: Browser
- Release: 26 January 2014
- Mode: Single-player

How Do You Do It? (styled as how do you Do It?) is a 2014 video game by independent developers Nina Freeman, Jonathan Kittaka, Emmett Butler and Decky Coss. The game is a short browser game in which the player is a young girl who attempts to understand how sex works by experimenting with her dolls. Developed as part of the 2014 Global Game Jam, the subject matter of How Do You Do It? was designed as a short and humorous experience inspired by Freeman's childhood memories of playing with her dolls in the same manner. Upon release, the game received positive reception, with publications praising the game's light-hearted tone and representation of childhood experiences of understanding sexuality. The game was also nominated as a finalist for the Nuovo Award at the 2015 Independent Games Festival.

== Gameplay ==
A screenshot of gameplay

The player is an eleven-year-old girl whose mother has left the house. Whilst alone, the player uses the keyboard to move and rotate two dolls to move them together in an attempt to understand sex, with the girl's thoughts about the "hugging" and "kissing" of the dolls appearing in thought bubbles and changing in expression from surprise, disgust and embarrassment. The player is required to move the dolls away upon the mother's return using audio cues: if the dolls are separated when this occurs, the game ends with the player having hidden the dolls from her mother, if not, the game ends with the mother alerted to the dolls. The game ends with a screen counting the number of times the player "might have done sex" by putting the dolls together.

== Development ==
How Do You Do It? was developed in three days by Nina Freeman and a team of independent developers, including Jonathan Kittaka, Emmett Butler, and Decky Coss, for the 2014 Global Game Jam. Freeman stated that the concept was based on her own "complex memories" and childhood experiences, including using dolls to attempting to understand sex, witnessing sex scenes in films such as Titanic, and sexuality being a taboo topic in her family household. After revisiting the memories with partner and co-developer Emmett Butler before the commencement of the Global Game Jam, Freeman found the memories to be grounded in physicality in a way that "seemed readily expressive within a game context" and used them as a concept for the game. The "clumsy" controls were designed intentionally to convey the "lack of understanding" and "awkwardness" of the subject matter, and make the gameplay a "simpler and funnier" experience, with the team focusing on conveying a humorous tone for the game.

== Reception ==
How Do You Do It? received praise for its presentation and the significance of its premise of exploring formative experiences of female sexuality. Describing the game as "extremely charming and deceptively meaningful", Porpentine praised the importance of the game's themes in representing childhood experiences around understanding sexuality and "depicting girls as human beings". Writing also for Rock Paper Shotgun, Cara Ellison of praised the game for "neatly" addressing "the space between feeling sexual and not knowing what to do with it" and the "feeble attempt at making sense of sex in a world where there are no tools for girls to do so". Ellison also noted for The Guardian that the game was "fun to play", citing the "adorable" artwork and "clumsy and silly" gameplay mechanics that "contextualised sex into a ridiculous prospect". Jesse Singal for the Boston Globe found the game "intriguing" and "weirdly powerful", finding that the evocation of "complicity" and "guilt" represented in the player character's behaviours was "effective" and unique to the video game medium. Game Informer also praised the game as having "a certain earnest humour to it".

How Do You Do It? was nominated as a finalist for the Nuovo Award at the 2015 Independent Games Festival.
