= I Wish I Were the Moon =

2008 video game

I Wish I Were The Moon
- Developer: Daniel Benmergui
- Platforms: Browser, Flash
- Release: 2008
- Genres: Puzzle game, artgame
- Mode: Single-player

I Wish I Were the Moon is a short Flash game by Argentine game developer Daniel Benmergui. It has been described as "a short love story told in the form of a puzzle game." The game was, as part of a collection of Benmergui's games, a finalist at the Sense of Wonder Night at the 2009 Tokyo Game Show. The game brought its maker, Benmergui, to international attention.

== Gameplay ==
I Wish I Were the Moon is a puzzle game where you can use to capture certain objects that can click and drop to where you can place it into.

== Reception ==
Mitu Khandaker-Kokoris called the game one of the simplest yet most effective example of portraying relationships by exposing the player to specific stories. Patrick Dugan of Gamasutra remarked the game was popular among female players.

The graphic style of I Wish I Were the Moon inspired Gregory Weir to emulate it for his game (I Fell In Love With) The Majesty of Colors.

The game was featured in the book 250 Indie Games You Must Play by Mike Rose.
