= Dreamcore =

Dreamcore may refer to:

- Dreamcore (aesthetic), an Internet aesthetic that gained popularity during the early 2020s
- Dreamcore (music), a subgenre of melodic hardcore music from the 2010s
- Dreamcore (video game), 2025 video game
