= Dominique Pamplemousse in "It's All Over Once the Fat Lady Sings!" =

2020 video game

- Steam cover art
- Developer: Deirdra Kiai Productions
- Platforms: Windows, Mac, iOS
- Release: 31 March 2013
- Mode: Single-player

Dominique Pamplemousse in "It's All Over Once the Fat Lady Sings!" is a 2013 video game by independent developer Deirdra Kiai. The game is a musical interactive fiction game with characters and visuals animated in stop motion. Following release, the game was nominated for several awards at the 2014 Independent Games Festival, including the Seumas McNally Grand Prize and Nuovo Award. A sequel, Dominique Pamplemousse & Dominique Pamplemousse in: "Combinatorial Explosion!" was published in 2017.

== Gameplay ==
Screenshot of gameplay in Dominique Pamplemousse

Players assume the role of Dominique Pamplemousse, a non-binary detective who is called upon to solve the case of the disappearance of teen idol and pop star Casey Byngham. Dialogue in the game is sung by the characters, accompanied by subtitled text. The game uses a point and click interface for players to reveal clues through dialogue with characters, with puzzles completed through dialogue.

== Development and release ==
Dominique Pamplemousse was created by independent developer Deirdra Kiai, a graduate at UC Santa Cruz and a former Hothead Games programmer who had made games for over a decade prior. Kiai said that completion of the project was made in the time expected, although they experienced minor delays due to a competing work contract. The game was re-released on Steam and Humble on 11 March 2014.

Kiai announced the game and published a demo in 2012 as part of a successful crowdfunding campaign on Indiegogo. Describing the game as "endearingly ramshackle", Alec Meer of Rock Paper Shotgun praised its "unabashed silliness" of the demo, although considered that "meaty puzzles perhaps aren't in great supply". The game was also exhibited at IndieCade for E3 in 2013 as part of its Official Selection.

== Reception ==
Reception

Review score
Publication	Score
Adventure Gamers	3.5/5

Describing the game as "charming, witty and experimentally fun", Adventure Gamers found the game "amusing" and considered the "unpolished" nature of the game's singing and claymation helped in "creating a world which strays from easy interpretation and is inevitably messier, more confusing, and ultimately much more personal and compelling than most conventional narratives". Becky Chambers of The Mary Sue praised the game's commitment to its "oddball humour", "cheeky" plot, and "half-assed" visual presentation. Chambers lauded the game's "effortless subtlety" in its themes around gender identity, considering the ambiguous presentation of Dominique's gender identity as subversive and demonstrating the "ridiculousness" of characters' efforts to "tie themselves in knots over what pronouns to use" for the character. Cassidee Moser of Kill Screen commended the game's "valiant mission" of its intent to "deliver commentary on social issues" around the economy and gender identity. However, Moser critiqued these as "half-realised" and "forced", stating that "gender never plays a meaningful role in Dominique's characterization", and "we never get a real sense of how tough or in what way economic struggles have hurt any of the people outside of our main character".

=== Accolades ===
Dominique Pamplemousse received several nominations at the 2014 Independent Games Festival, including the Nuovo Award, Seumas McNally Grand Prize, Excellence in Narrative and Excellence in Audio Awards. Kiai expressed surprise at the nominations, but stated they were reassured to not have won an award, stating greater visibility for the game may have exposed them to online harassment.
