= Tales From Off-Peak City Vol. 1 =

- Developer: Cosmo D
- Publisher: Cosmo D
- Designer: Greg Heffernan
- Programmer: Greg Heffernan
- Artist: Greg Heffernan
- Composer: Greg Heffernan
- Engine: Unity
- Platforms: Linux; macOS; Windows
- Release: May 15, 2020
- Genre: Adventure game
- Mode: Single-player

Tales From Off-Peak City Vol. 1 is a 2020 adventure game developed and published by Cosmo D. Players explore a surreal city. It is the sequel to Off-Peak and The Norwood Suite and was followed by Betrayal at Club Low.

== Gameplay ==
Two mysterious people task the player to steal a saxophone from Caetano Grosso, a former musician who now runs a pizzeria. The game is played from a first-person perspective and focuses on exploring the world. While posing as a pizzeria employee, the player makes custom-order pizzas based on abstract and somewhat nonsensical phrases (which writer Matthew J.R. Parsons likened to Brian Eno's Oblique Strategies) and meets the various citizens of Off-Peak City. After delivering the pizzas, the player can sneak through customers' houses and photograph the surreal objects found in them. The game does not have voice acting; instead, non-player characters' speech is rendered as music.

== Development ==
Greg Heffernan made the game mostly by himself using Unity and Blender. After being released as a part of a Humble Bundle, the game was released on May 15, 2020.

== Reception ==
Tales From Off-Peak City Vol. 1 received positive reviews on Metacritic. Despite his fears that it might be impenetrable, Rock Paper Shotgun's reviewer found it to be a very fun game that is enjoyable on a surface level. He felt that the game helps players discover their own meaning without being pretentious, likening it to being subtly tricked into having deep thoughts. Eurogamer wrote, "It's bizarre and unsettling, yet also captivating and hugely engaging." Comparing it to the works of film director David Lynch, Adventure Gamers said it may be too weird for some players but recommended it to those who are open-minded or fans of surrealism.

Slant Magazine and Rock Paper Shotgun included it in their best games of 2020, and it was nominated for the Nuovo Award at the 2020 Independent Games Festival.
