= Straftat =

2024 video game

- Steam header art
- Developers: Sirius Lemaitre, Leonard Lemaitre
- Publisher: Lemaitre Bros
- Engine: Unity
- Platforms: Windows, Linux, Mac
- Release: 24 October 2024
- Genre: First-person shooter
- Mode: Multiplayer

Straftat is a 2024 first-person shooter freeware video game developed by French duo Sirius Lemaitre and Leonard Lemaitre under the entity Lemaitre Bros. Upon release, Straftat received praise directed towards the pacing and control of its action gameplay and map variety, with several critics comparing the title to older games in the arena shooter genre.

== Gameplay ==
The gameplay of Straftat is that of an arena shooter, in which 2-4 players duel using disposable weapons, including pistols, assault rifles and machine guns located across the map. The game places a significant emphasis on the players' movement, with various parkour abilities such as sprinting, sliding and wallrunning. The player can also lean around corners, which provides a layer of slower, more tactical gameplay on some of the provided maps. The freeware version of the game contains 70 maps, with an additional 70 playable as paid downloadable content with the Weapons, Maps and Hats DLC. This DLC also includes the map from Babbdi, a previous game by the same developers.

== Development ==
Developer Leonard Lemaitre stated that the game was inspired by manga such as Blame! and Aposimz, Fumito Ueda games including Ico and Shadow of the Colossus, and the design of neoclassical and brutalist architecture.

The game originally released with only a 1v1 game mode, but in July 2025 it received an update adding modes for up to four players, including a 2v2 team mode and free-for-all. In addition, a "Supporters' Edition" release was also added, which provides additional in-game cosmetics, a digital art book, and Blender project files for the game's environments.

== Reception ==
Several critics praised the game as evocative of earlier multiplayer first-person shooter titles including Quake and Counter-Strike, and remarked that the game provided value as a freeware title. Kaan Serin of GamesRadar+ similarly commended the game's simplicity and quick gameplay compared to the live service model of modern first-person shooters, a point also noted by other critics. Writing for PC Gamer, Ted Litchfield described the game as a "great multiplayer shooter" due to its map design, variety of weapons and handling, discussing the game's variation of mechanics across maps "completely change how you play - each one has a curveball, something to surprise you and make you rethink your strategy", with Cole Luke naming the game as "one of the year's best shooters". Rick Lane of Rock Paper Shotgun praised the game as breaking new ground in reviving the arena shooter genre, highlighting its variety of maps, "sleek and clinical" combat mechanics and "grimy, ramshackle aesthetic". Serin also praised the game's learning curve in requiring familiarity with the environment and mechanics used by each map.
