= Sage Solitaire =

2015 video game

- Developer: Zach Gage
- Publishers: Zach Gage, Noodlecake Studios (Android)
- Platforms: iOS, Android
- Release: iOS 26 August 2015 Android 3 February 2016
- Genre: Puzzle
- Mode: Single-player

Sage Solitaire is a video game by independent developer Zach Gage for iOS in 2015. It is a card game that merges elements of solitaire and klondike, in which players combine cards from nine decks by making poker hands with topmost cards. A port to Android was published in February 2016. Upon release, Sage Solitaire received positive reviews, with critics praising the game's addictiveness and replayability. Following release, the game was nominated for a Nuovo Award and an award at the Game Developers Choice Awards.

== Gameplay ==
Players make poker hands by selecting cards from at least two different rows of nine stacked decks.

Sage Solitaire is a variation of a solitaire card game in which a deck of 51 playing cards is laid onto nine stacks on a three-by-three grid. The objective of the game is to earn as many points as possible and clear the board of cards to progress to the next stage. Cards can be removed and points earned by making various poker hands (such as three of a kind, full house or flush) from cards collected from the stacks; however, pairs must be matched with cards on at least two different rows. Playing a poker hand removes the cards from the stack, revealing the cards beneath. Points are earned by removing one of the piles or playing a hand. The value of points earned is modified by the location of the removed stack on the playfield, the type of hand, and whether a played poker hand contains a card that matches a randomly-selected suit at the start of the game. Players also have two 'trash' tokens they can play during any turn that allows them to discard a card on one of the decks. Later updates to the game contain additional play modes, including a True Grit mode which permanently ends the game if the player loses all their in-game funds, and an Instant Tournament mode that allows online players to compare their highest scores with the same configuration of cards in the deck.

== Development and release ==
Sage Solitaire was created by STFJ, the studio of New York City based independent developer Zach Gage, who had previously developed titles including SpellTower. Gage stated that the game was intended to design a solitaire title where the "cards were big enough to see and easily touch" on a phone screen, combining aspects of poker and klondike. In 2017, Gage published Flip Flop Solitaire, a successor with a similar premise.

== Reception ==
Reception

Aggregate score
Aggregator	Score
Metacritic	88%

Review scores
Publication	Score
Gamezebo	90%
Pocket Gamer	4.5/5
TouchArcade	5/5
148Apps	3.5/5

Sage Solitaire received "generally favorable" reviews, according to review aggregator Metacritic. Describing Sage Solitaire as a "fantastic example of how to make a mobile card game that's unique, fast and strategic", Carter Dotson of TouchArcade praised its "pick up and play" appeal, although felt the randomness could be "harsh". Jared Nelson, also for TouchArcade, awarded it the site's 'Game of the Week', stating it was an "ultimate go-to game" for its quick play sessions and strategic depth. Jim Squires of Gamezebo considered it a "refreshingly new approach to solitaire" and "clearly made for quick bursts of play", stating the game design felt "much deeper and more thought out than the game's simple rules might suggest". Craig Grannell of Pocket Gamer highlighted the game's "nagging replay quality" and quick playtime, although noted it was an "inherently simpler and more limited game" than Gage's previous work. Jennifer Allen of 148Apps viewed the gameplay as "challenging" and "compelling", similarly stating the short play time was "ideal for dipping in and out of".

=== Accolades ===
Sage Solitare was a nominee for the Nuovo Award at the 2016 Independent Games Festival, and an Honorable Mention for 'Best Handheld/Mobile Game' at the 2016 Game Developers Choice Awards.
