= Horses (video game) =

2025 video game

- Developer: Santa Ragione
- Designer: Andrea Lucco Borlera
- Engine: Unity
- Platform: Windows
- Release: 2 December 2025
- Genre: Adventure
- Mode: Single-player

Horses is a 2025 video game developed and published by the Italian game production studio Santa Ragione and filmmaker Andrea Lucco Borlera. It is a horror-adventure video game in which the player assists a young man, Anselmo, to tend to a farm owned by an unnamed farmer, who keeps enslaved humans dressed in horse masks. Gameplay is accompanied by experimental imagery, such as silent film motifs, camera shots, intertitles, and live-action footage. Borlera, an Italian designer and filmmaker, created the concept for the game and pitched it to Santa Ragione, citing surrealist cinema as an inspiration for the game's design and imagery.

In November 2025, shortly before release of the game, developer Santa Ragione disclosed that the digital distribution service Steam had made a final decision not to distribute the game on the platform, which was followed by the Epic Games Store taking similar steps. The developer stated the view that platform owners, including Valve, had not provided transparent reasons for the content ban. Horses was subsequently released on other platforms including GOG.com and itch.io. The ban prompted commentary about the role of games distribution censorship and the impact on independent games production.

Following release, Horses received mixed reviews, with critics praising the game's use of filmic techniques and unique premise, and expressing that the game did not feature sufficiently explicit content to merit removal from digital distribution platforms. Critiques of the game focused on the execution of its themes, with some describing the game as lacking choice or narrative subtlety. Despite its removal from several stores, sales of Horses were sufficient to allow Santa Ragione to repay debts taken to produce the game, although not enough for the studio to develop future titles.

== Gameplay ==
Gameplay screenshot

Horses is a first-person narrative horror video game. Players complete tasks over a series of consecutive days, which are presented as a list attached to the exterior of a farmhouse. The tasks, such as watering the crops, begin as simple, but become more abstract and disturbing over time. Completion of many tasks requires tools collected from throughout the farm and using them in their instructed context, with players only able to carry two at a time. Completion of some actions are interspersed with live-action cutscenes depicting the action players are undertaking, and some events are overlaid on the screen to draw the attention of players to them. Dialogue with characters is presented via an intertitle after the character speaks.

== Plot ==
The player is Anselmo, a young man who is sent to spend two weeks working on a farm. He is immediately introduced to the farmer and his "horses", who are humans kept naked except for masks, fed on hay and water, "ridden" on the shoulders, raced, and forced to pull a plow. Anselmo soon learns that the farmer's dog, Fido, is also a human in a mask and serves as a guard and supervisor.

As the farmer takes Anselmo into his trust, he learns that the farmer captures people caught engaging in sexual activity in the nearby woods, injects them with horse fluids, and brainwashes them into servitude. He is aided by a corrupt businessman, a preacher, and a vet, who visit the farm to abuse the "horses" in different ways. "Horses" who have sex with each other are punished by beating and castration, while the farmer wears a large locked chastity belt at all times. On one of several occasions, the farmer gets drunk and puts on his own horse mask, then has a female "horse" raped by Fido while the farmer watches and attempts to masturbate.

Anselmo befriends a female "horse" named Linda, who informs him that she is in contact with Fiero, a male "horse" who previously escaped and plans to free all the "horses". Fiero and Linda's plan fails, resulting in the death of Fido, Fiero being nailed to a stake to die, and Linda being recaptured for torture and brainwashing. Anselmo locates Linda and releases her, but is caught by the farmer. The farmer prepares to inject Anselmo to turn him into the next Fido, but Linda ambushes him, and together she and Anselmo tie the farmer down and inject him with horse fluids. The game ends with the "horses" holding a funeral for Fiero, with Linda giving Fiero's mask to Anselmo, who leads the "horses" off the farm to freedom.

== Development and release ==
Horses was conceived by Andrea Lucco Borlera, a film graduate at the Roma Tre University, developing the game's concept and directing the live action sequences. Borlera stated the design and aesthetic of the game was inspired by surrealist filmmakers Luis Buñuel and Jan Švankmajer, and the work of filmmaker Yorgos Lanthimos. Borlera also cited childhood experiences of fear of horses and their handlers on his grandfather's farm as a source for the game's direction. The game was developed by Santa Ragione, an Italian game studio formed in 2010 by Pietro Righi Riva and Nicolò Tedeschi, who had created titles including Wheels of Aurelia and Mediterranea Inferno. After finding difficulty in pitching the game to studios, Borlera stated the partnership arose from a chance meeting with Riva. Development cost the studio approximately $100,000 in costs, half of which was raised from friends.

Horses was announced in June 2023 as part of the IGN Summer of Gaming event, alongside the release of a trailer. The game experienced delays from its intended 2024 release date due to then-undisclosed reasons, with developers announcing the final release date and trailer for the game in 2025.

=== Storefront bans ===
In November 2025, immediately prior to the game's release date, Santa Ragione announced that they were unable to release Horses on Steam as Valve Corporation had made a final decision to not permit the game on the platform due to it breaching the platform's content guidelines. Following this announcement, Epic Games Store sent an email to Santa Ragione stating that they had resubmitted the International Age Rating Coalition questionnaire for Horses and received results suggesting an Adults Only 18+ (AO) rating, and that they would therefore not sell the game as it was against their policy to carry AO-rated games. Santa Ragione stated that when they had done the same, their questionnaire results suggested a Mature 17+ rating. Distributor GOG issued a statement that it would retain the game on its platform, stating that it was "proud" to host it as "players should be able to choose the experiences that speak to them". GOG's managing director Maciej Gołębiewski said of their decision, "We believe in creative freedom, because once a company, through their own terms of service, decides what's good and what's not good - what's acceptable; what can be sold and what cannot be sold - it's a slippery slope from that point onward."

The studio stated that Steam provided an automated response following an initial review that the game would not be distributed as it, in Valve's words, "appears, in our judgment, to depict sexual conduct involving a minor". The studio characterized the judgment as "vague and unfounded" and that Steam did not provide further feedback on scenes or elements that triggered the ban. They speculated that the decision stemmed from reviewers seeing a scene in a dialogue sequence depicting a child being carried on the shoulders of a naked adult woman, which they stated was "not sexual in any way". This character was later changed to an adult during development. As a result of the ban, Santa Ragione stated that whilst the game would receive post-launch support, the studio may need to wind down its operations, as the inability to secure an external partnership with a publisher due to the ban led to an "unsustainable financial situation". Following announcement, Valve shared a statement with media outlets stating that the platform had pre-emptively banned Horses based on a review of the game's store page and content in 2023. Following a later request by the studio to appeal this decision, Valve stated they undertook an internal content review, "extensively" discussed the game, and communicated to the developer a final decision that the game could not be shipped, consistent with their rules and guidelines.

The announcement prompted commentary on the role of game distribution platforms in approving or rejecting works with adult content. Several critics discussed that moderation of the game raised issues around artistic freedom of expression, and Chris Tapsell of Eurogamer wrote that it exposed a "much bigger problem" for freedom of expression, including the monopoly of Valve on digital distribution, the opaqueness of its decision-making, and similar issues faced in other industries. Citing discourse relating to Steam's content moderation of adult games required by payment processors following activism by Collective Shout, Nathan Grayson of Aftermath stated that these decisions reflected censorship and would "reverberate through the industry" and argued platforms should not decide "what does and does not constitute commercially viable art".

== Reception ==
=== Pre-release reception ===
Pre-release demo coverage for Horses praised the game's provocative and experimental concept. Edge praised the game's experimental qualities for keeping the game fresh and enhancing the "disquieting mood", highlighting the game's aesthetic choices such as its use of close-up shots, which "magnifies deformities and accentuates the grotesqueness of the human faces, turning a simple mealtime conversation into a paranoid fever dream". Describing the demo as "[defying] easy categorisation", Ignas Vieversys of The Guardian acknowledged the game was "unpredictable and jagged" and a "difficult pitch", but found the game's vision "promising". Edwin Evans-Thirwell of Rock Paper Shotgun considered the premise "repellent and compelling", commending the game's visuals cutscenes as occupying the uncanny valley and showcasing the "specific varieties of ugliness only videogames are capable of". Robert Purchese of Eurogamer stated that the game was "decidedly quieter" than Santa Ragione's previous works, noting its "minimal dialogue" and "eerily rudimentary construction". IGN stated that the demo was "not for the faint of heart".

=== Critical reception ===
Reception

Aggregate scores
Aggregator	Score
Metacritic	73/100
OpenCritic	56% recommend

Review scores
Publication	Score
The A.V. Club	C
Edge	7/10
Eurogamer	4/5
IGN	7/10
Slant Magazine	4/5

According to review aggregator platform Metacritic, Horses received "mixed or average" reviews. OpenCritic determined that 56% of critics recommended the game. Critics generally praised Horses for its aesthetic and experimental qualities, and several reviewers highlighted the game's use of silent film motifs. Maddi Chilton of PC Gamer wrote that the game "borrows heavily from the language of film", including its black and white color scheme, aspect ratio, and title cards. Steven Scaife of Slant felt the "jarring and intrusive" use of intertitles and "eerily overlaid" imagery was "especially forceful" in the context of the game's subject matter. Describing the game as "steeped in film history", Edge favorably compared Horses to the film Un Chien Andalou, writing that "Borlera uses every trick in the experimental filmmaker's playbook to unsettle."

Many critics considered the content of Horses disturbing but insufficiently explicit to merit its censorship. Alyssa Mercante of The Guardian said the game's controversy was "superfluous" and the game was "by no means shocking or radical", citing its lack of explicit gore or violence, and self-censorship of nudity by using pixelization. Chris Person of Aftermath opined that Horses was "goofy, cartoonish, and self-censored", cited numerous other video games which he felt to be more explicit in terms of sexual and violent themes, and criticized both Valve and Epic, calling their decision to ban the game "embarrassing". Megan Farokhmanesh of Wired felt that commentary on the game's censorship had distracted reviewers from genuine criticism of its themes, expressing surprise that other reviews had overlooked the game's "shoddy" depiction of sexual assault.

Several reviewers thought that the impact of the themes in Horses was limited by its narrative and gameplay execution, with Catherine Masters of The A.V. Club stating that whilst the game had strong imagery, it was not effective in its aims and lacked subtlety. Sarah Thwaites of IGN stated that "repetitive activities" and "unclear signposting" had the tendency to "pull [the player] out of [the game's] silent filmlike world"; whilst Chilton found the chorelike gameplay impactful, she felt the "rapid pace and on-rails nature" compromised elements of interactivity that made the themes best expressed as a video game. Farokhmanesh wrote that Horses lacked "any sort of moral resolution", leaving the game's ideas "half-baked".

=== Sales ===
Upon release, Horses reached the top of the recent best-seller lists for itch.io and GOG.com. Riva stated the commercial performance of the game on these platforms would assist the studio to partially recoup most of the loans used to fund the game, although it would likely not allow the studio to produce new games. By December 2025, the game had sold over 18,000 copies and $65,000 in net revenue, which were sufficient for Santa Ragione to repay its debts, although still insufficient for the studio to plan any future development. Kotaku speculated that the game's visibility may have been aided by the storefront bans, and whilst Riva noted the publicity had helped sales, he was uncertain of how it compares to having access to the kind of audience as offered by Steam.

=== Awards ===
Year	Award	Category	Result	Ref.
2019	A Maze	Most Amazing Game	Nominated	
2019	IndieCade	Official Selection	Nominated	
2026	Italian Video Game Awards	Best Italian Game	Nominated	
2026	Italian Video Game Awards	Community Spotlight Award	Nominated	
2026	Italian Video Game Awards	Outstanding Experience	Won	
2026	Golden Joystick Awards	Developer's Choice	Nominated	
2026	Independent Games Festival	Seumas McNally Grand Prize	Nominated	
2026	Independent Games Festival	Excellence in Narrative	Honorable mention	
2026	Independent Games Festival	Nuovo Award	Won	
