= Orchids to Dusk =

2015 video game

- Developer: Pol Clarissou
- Publisher: KO_OP
- Composer: Marskye
- Platforms: Windows, MacOS, Linux
- Release: 3 December 2015
- Genre: Adventure
- Modes: Single-player, Multiplayer

Orchids to Dusk is a 2015 video game by independent developer Pol Clarissou. It was listed as a finalist of the Nuovo Award at the 2016 Independent Games Festival.

== Gameplay ==
Gameplay screenshot

Players assume the role of a character who has crash-landed on an alien planet, with a slowly depleting meter of oxygen giving them a limited amount of time to explore the area. Once the player character sits after a period of inactivity, players are provided with the option to remove their helmet. Removing the helmet prematurely causes the character to die, with plants emerging from the surface to mark the location of their death. If players let the character's oxygen run out, they die and their remains persist on the surface. The game features a multiplayer component in which players that die leave a persistent mark on the landscape based upon the location and method of their death.

== Development ==
Orchids to Dusk was developed by Pol Clarissou, at the time a games development student and member of Klondike, a French games collective, and supported by the KOLAB Funding Program of studio KO_OP. Clarissou created the game in Unity over seven month. Building on their earlier work Even the Stars and inspired by the Merritt Kopas title Soft Chambers, Clarissou stated that the game's design came from a desire to guide players to "enjoy idleness and contemplation" in a world where player agency was limited. The inclusion of a multiplayer component was intended as an "important part of the experience", and to reinforce the game's themes through encouraging indirect methods of player interaction.

== Reception ==
Finding the game personally resonant, Chris Priestman of Kill Screen praised Orchids to Dusk for its "unexpected emotional turn" in guiding players to "die on your own terms" by removing their helmet, finding this ending conveyed an "experiential acceptance of serene futility". Priestman stated this ending was less "forlorn and lonesome" than merely letting the character run out of oxygen. Joe Donnelly of Rock Paper Shotgun similarly described the game's "sombre yet wonderful experience", highlighting its accompanying "soothing electronic melodies". Kate Gray of The Guardian wrote that its ending "teaches you the world is sometimes just as it is, and the only thing you can do is experience it".

=== Accolades ===
Orchids to Dusk received a nomination for the Nuovo Award and the Best Student Game at the 2016 Independent Games Festival.
