= Milky Way Prince: The Vampire Star =

2020 video game

- Developer: Eyeguys
- Publishers: Santa Ragione (PC); Fantastico Studio (consoles)
- Designer: Lorenzo Redaelli
- Platforms: macOS, Windows, Nintendo Switch, PlayStation 4, PlayStation 5, Xbox One, Xbox Series X/S
- Release: 13 August 2020 (PC); 21 June 2022 (consoles)
- Genre: Visual novel
- Mode: Single-player

Milky Way Prince: The Vampire Star is a 2020 video game developed by Eyeguys and published by Santa Ragione. It is a visual novel about a relationship between two people, Nuki and Sune. It deals with issues about mental health. The game was designed by Lorenzo Redaelli and is described as a semi-autobiographical work.

== Reception ==
Reception

Aggregate scores
Aggregator	Score
Metacritic	67/100 (PC)
OpenCritic	53% recommend

Review scores
Publication	Score
Eurogamer	Recommended
IGN	8.2/10 (Italy); 6/10 (Japan)
MeriStation	7/10
The Games Machine (Italy)	7.5/10
Multiplayer.it	6.5/10
PCMag	2.5/5

The PC version of Milky Way Prince: The Vampire Star received "mixed or average" reviews from critics, according to the review aggregation website Metacritic. Fellow review aggregator OpenCritic assessed that the game received fair approval, being recommended by 53% of critics.

Rock Paper Shotgun wrote: "Milky Way Prince manages to avoid conflating mental illness with cartoonish malice, presenting a nuanced, all too realistic portrait of a toxic relationship and all the different ways it can fail." Eurogamer said the game "[...] feels like the first steps of a future master." Dread Central called the game "moody" and "remarkable".

== See also ==
- Mediterranea Inferno, the second game by Lorenzo Redaelli
