= Oikospiel =

2017 video game

- itch.io cover art
- Developer: David Kanaga
- Engine: Unity
- Release: 16 February 2017
- Mode: Single-player

Oikospiel (titled as Oἶκοςpiel Book 1) is a 2017 video game by independent developer David Kanaga. Upon release, the game received positive reception from critics for its intersection of political, artistic and musical qualities within the medium of a video game, and commentary on the underlying politics of video game development. Following release, the game received awards at the 2017 Independent Games Festival and IndieCade, including the Nuovo Award.

== Gameplay ==
Oikospiel has been described as an experimental or art game, and includes first- and third-person exploration elements set across 40 levels in five acts. Across these acts, the player controls various characters as they explore the environments. The scenes depict the story of a team of canine programmers developing an opera of the Laurence Sterne novel The Life and Opinions of Tristram Shandy, Gentleman for their publisher, Donkey Koch. Following the cancellation of their project by the publisher for running over budget, the dogs stage a general strike in line with their union, the United Animal Workers. The Union is organizing a global gaming festival named the Geospiel in the year 2100, and are courting the dogs of Koch Games to join.

== Development and release ==
Oikospiel is the first game released independently by David Kanaga, the audio designer and composer of the video games Proteus, Panoramical and Dyad. Kanaga began work on the game in late 2014, after discovering the Unity development tools would allow him to create a game on his own. Many of the game's visual assets were imported from other sources, including the Unity Asset Store and TurboSquid, with Kanaga using keywords to locate imagery, "piecing diverse components together" to have an operatic or "engulfing quality". Kanaga stated the game's narrative involves exploring the "image of global warming and the industry of its denial", partially inspired by the work of Naomi Klein and her book This Changes Everything: Capitalism vs. the Climate. The title is a portmanteau, including Oikos, the Greek word for "household" and the root of "economy" and "ecology", and Spiel, the German word for play, uniting the game's themes of video games, politics and the environment.

The game was released on itch.io and via a pay what you want model on the developer's website, where users can input their annual household earnings or operate a wind turbine to adjust the cost of a virtual "ticket price" to download the game. In parallel with the game's release, Kanaga self-published a sixty-page libretto containing a "deeper backstory, plot interpretation, and walkthrough" in complement to the game.

== Reception ==
=== Critical reception ===
Several sites considered Oikospiel as one of the best games of 2017, including the AV Club, IGN PC Gamer, and VG247. Several critics also discussed the intersection of the game with art or music due to its experimental qualities. Daniel Fries of Paste found the game to be evocative of a "long tradition of politically-minded art" and "one of very few games that takes the time to examine the politics of game-making". Fries drew parallels between the game's "avant-garde realism" and the work of playwright Bertolt Brecht, stating both deliver "direct and unmediated" political messages through breaking immersion; the game embracing its "jerky camera and abrasive transitions" as part of its aesthetic. Brendan Keogh of Unwinnable praised the game's breadth in genre and scale, highlighting its thematic exploration of issues "such as ecology, economy, labor rights, animal rights, energy, and really, existence itself".

Critics also praised the game's union of visual and thematic elements. Describing the game as "wildly ambitious", Clayton Purdom of AV Club stated the game was "the best art game of the year" and conveyed a "coherent set of thoughts on the effects of neoliberal policies on the environment. Alice O'Connor of Rock Paper Shotgun found the game to be similarly "endlessly surprising" and "delightful", highlighting the game's surrealism and "snippets of allegory" as "scenes and stories of form and function roll together and across each other". James Davenport of PC Gamer stated the game was "truly bizarre", but "has something to say", considering its "choppy, beautiful arrangements" to "integrate entirely" with the gameplay. Considering the game's message to be "forcefully urgent", Lewis Gordon of Vice described the game as "incongruous" and "colored by Kanaga's surreal imagination", creating a game "unlike anything you’ve ever played before". Daniel Shkolnik, also writing for Vice, praised the game as a work that "toys with what opera can be".

=== Accolades ===
Oikospiel received the Nuovo Award at the 2017 Independent Games Festival. The game also received the Grand Jury Prize at the 2017 IndieCade Festival.
