= Babbdi =

2022 video game

- Developers: Sirius Lemaitre; Léonard Lemaitre
- Publisher: Lemaitre Bros
- Platforms: Linux; macOS; Windows
- Release: WW: December 22, 2022
- Genre: Adventure
- Mode: Single-player

Babbdi is a 2022 adventure game developed by Sirius and Léonard Lemaitre and published by Lemaitre Bros. It is freeware.

== Gameplay ==
The game is set in the titular Babbdi, a city full of brutalist architecture. It is a platform game set in an open world. There are numerous tools across the world to traverse Babbdi, but the player is only meant to hold one at once. The main objective is to obtain a train ticket and leave on the subway. This can be completed very quickly and requires little exploration or interaction with the city, leaving most of the game as optional content. Players are free to explore, speak to residents, and seek out collectibles for a trophy screen, and complete side quests as well as dance with the party people who live in the sewers.

== Development ==
The Lemaitre Bros released Babbdi on December 22, 2022.

== Reception ==
The Guardian likened it to the kinds of games found on PlayStation demo disks and called it "targeted relief from 2023's anxieties". Der Standard called it weird and entertaining. PC Gamer praised the platforming elements and level design. They said it is disconcerting but not a horror game, and they recommended it to fans of melancholy indie games. Rock Paper Shotgun compared it to Bernband and Off-Peak. They said it is a "weird, unpleasant place" that is fun to explore, and identified it is one of their favorite games of 2023.

== See also ==
- Straftat, a later game by the same developers
