= Where the Bees Make Honey =

2019 video game

- Developer: Whitethorn Digital
- Publisher: Wakefield Interactive
- Engine: Unity
- Platforms: Windows, Nintendo Switch, PlayStation 4, Xbox One, Xbox Series
- Release: Windows, PlayStation 4, Xbox: WW: 26 March 2019; Nintendo Switch: WW: 17 October 2019
- Genre: Adventure
- Mode: Single-player

Where the Bees Make Honey is a 2019 video game developed by Whitethorn Digital and published by Wakefield Interactive. It is a narrative puzzle video game in which players re-enact the childhood memories of Sunny, an office worker. The game is the debut of independent developer Brian Wilson. Following release, the game received generally unfavorable reviews, although was nominated for the Nuovo Award, at the 2019 Independent Games Festival.

== Gameplay ==
Gameplay is split over several scenes that feature different modes of play, with some played as three-dimensional gameplay and others in isometric perspective. The main sequences of the game involve puzzles where players rotate pieces of a city. The objective of these puzzles is to guide the player character through a path that allows them to collect all of the floating honeycombs within a level. Other sequences do not have concrete goals, consisting of maintaining play until the narration has completed.

== Plot ==
The game's narrative is delivered as a monologue over a series of gameplay vignettes. These depict Sunny, a young woman who is working late in overtime as a telemarketer in an office cubicle, who yearns for the simplicity of her youth. After the office experiences a blackout, Sunny enters a dreamlike portal after returning the power on from the generator, where she transforms into her childhood self to recalling key moments from her childhood: including losing her bike on a winter night, or celebrating Halloween. Other fantastical scenes include Sunny turning into a remote control car, or a bunny. Leaving her dreamlike state, Sunny returns to reality and reminisces about childhood photos on her desk, revealing the connection between the game's sequences and her memories.

== Development and release ==
The game was developed by Wakefield Interactive, the studio of independent developer Brian Wilson, while he was enrolled at Penn State University. Wilson stated that the game was conceived to resemble the rotation of a Rubik's Cube. Following launch, the developer announced in April 2019 that a patch would be released to address technical complaints with the game and "tune some gameplay behaviours".

== Reception ==
Reception

Aggregate score
Aggregator	Score
Metacritic	31%

Review scores
Publication	Score
Adventure Gamers	2.5/5
Gaming Age	F
PlayStation Universe	3.5/10
TechRaptor	1/10

According to review aggregator Metacritic, Where the Bees Make Honey received "generally unfavorable" reviews. The game received an Honorable Mention for the Nuovo Award and Best Student Game at the 2019 Independent Games Festival.

Describing Where the Bees Make Honey as a "bad game" and "broken disaster", Matthew Pollesel of Gaming Age excoriated its scenes as "incredibly boring", "rushed and nonsensical" plot and "nightmarish" controls. Richard Hoover of Adventure Gamers enjoyed the game's "decent" visual design and honeycomb puzzles, but critiqued the game's changing variation of "disparate gameplay styles", "vapid and pointless" levels and inconsistent narrative. Bob Dunn of the Berkshire Eagle stated that he encountered "controller-throwing" technical issues upon release. However, he praised the game as overcoming its technical flaws, stating it featured "gorgeous" art and character models, and elicited an emotional reaction. Similarly, Ron Welch of TechRaptor experienced "extremely buggy" behaviors and poor controls across various sequences of the game, and finding the varied sequences gave "tonal whiplash" and were "physically painful" to play.
