= Subserial Network =

2018 video game

- Developer: Effigy Softworks
- Publisher: Effigy Softworks
- Platforms: Windows; macOS; Linux
- Release: 2018
- Mode: Single-player

Subserial Network is a 2018 video game created by independent developer Effigy Softworks. Upon release, critics praised the game for its facsimile of early online digital spaces, and the exploration of themes around gender identity. The game received an Honorable Mention for the Nuovo Award at the 2024 Independent Games Festival.

== Gameplay ==
Players assume the role of an agent of CETUS, tasked with locating rogue synthetics who have strayed from their assigned role. Searching through the Meshnet, a facsimile of an early Internet browser, players can read messages and forum posts, and listen to music on a virtual media player.

== Development ==
Montreal-based director Matilde Park, who led the project and writing for the game, stated that the game's themes were shaped by life experiences, including their experience with gender-affirming surgery, and stated the game's premise was to facilitate "understanding" and "empathy". The game was developed in Twine.

== Reception ==
PC Gamer praised the game's "excellent writing and amazing music", describing the process of "deciphering the enigma of who you are, what you're trying to accomplish, and whether or not it's the right thing to do" as an "absolutely gripping experience". Describing the game as a "gripping snoop-fest that tangles with big ideas", Kotaku praised the game's "interesting" presentation and use of a simulated internet as adding "a lot of weight to the sleuthing" and making the player feel like "a proper cyberpunk detective". Rock Paper Shotgun praised the game as "on form" for the developers' "meta-fictional cyber-scribbling", highlighting the "familiar webscape" of the meshnet and its "whirring world and its community of internet-obsessives", comparing its concepts of digital consciousness to the work of science fiction writer Greg Egan. The game also received an Honorable Mention for the Nuovo Award at the 2019 Independent Games Festival.

Several critics discussed the game's themes and representation of the science fiction and cyberpunk genres. Discussing the role of sexuality in science fiction, PC Gamer described the game's sequences around androids confronting their identity "affecting" and "haunting, even divorced of subtext". Khee Hoon Chan of Unwinnable praised the game's use of language as "fascinating", discussing how the "mechanical perspective" of the game's android characters subverts players expectations about how those characters understand their bodies, and serves effectively as "an analogy to the transgender experience and gender dysphoria". Developer Bennett Foddy similarly discussed the game's themes of "trans experience, alterity, gender dysphoria, and self-actualization" and how the use of nostalgia created a "undercurrent of loss and disappointment" that "resonated very strongly" with me around the lost optimism of digital spaces.
