= The Forest Cathedral =

2023 adventure video game

- Developer: Brian Wilson
- Publisher: Whitethorn Games
- Platforms: Microsoft Windows, Xbox Series, PlayStation 5
- Release: Windows, Xbox Series: WW: 14 March 2023; PlayStation 5: WW: 6 November 2023
- Genres: Adventure, Puzzle
- Mode: Single-player

The Forest Cathedral is a 2023 video game created by independent developer Brian Wilson and published by Whitethorn Games. The game is an adventure-puzzle game inspired by the work of environmentalist Rachel Carson. Upon release, the game received mixed reviews from critics, and was nominated for a Nuovo Award at the 2024 Independent Games Festival.

== Gameplay ==
The Forest Cathedral is a three-dimensional adventure exploration game in which the player, as Rachel Carson, undertaking field research on Science Island by using tools that scan the ecosystem. Revealing anomalies using these tools requires the player to solve two-dimensional puzzles.

== Development ==
The Forest Cathedral was created by solo developer Brian Wilson, based in Erie, Pennsylvania. Spring was inspired to create the game as a reimagining of Silent Spring, a book by environmentalist Rachel Carson about her studies on the impacts of the pesticide DDT on the ecosystem.

== Reception ==
Reception

Review scores
Publication	Score
The Guardian	3/5 stars
Softpedia	4/5 stars

The Forest Cathedral received mixed reviews from critics. Writing for Softpedia, Andrei Dumitrescu praised the "ambitious" graphics and the importance of the game's narrative in drawing attention to Carson's work, but felt it did not "fully work as a video game" due to anachronisms in its narrative and platforming elements that did not make sense in the context of the game. Edwin Evans-Thirlwell for The Guardian considered the game to feel "forced" in its message and feature "dissatisfying" voice acting, although finding the "shock and dislocation" of its themes to have merit as a horror game. Describing the game as "disjointed, unfocused and maddening", Brandon Chinn of SUPERJUMP considered the game's puzzles to be "alarmingly frustrating" and aspects of the narrative to be "starkly off-putting" and "antagonistic to the player.

=== Accolades ===
The Forest Cathedral was nominated for a Nuovo Award at the Independent Games Festival in 2024.
