= That Night, Steeped by Blood River =

2020 video game

- itch.io cover art
- Developer: Taylor Swietanski
- Engine: Unity
- Platforms: Windows; macOS
- Release: Windows: WW: 13 November 2020; macOS: WW: 22 November 2020
- Mode: Single-player

That Night, Steeped by Blood River is a 2020 video game created by independent developer Taylor Swietanski for Windows and macOS. The game received a positive reception from critics, with reviewers praising the game's surrealism and visual design. Following release, the game received a nomination for the Nuovo Award at the 2021 Independent Games Festival.

== Gameplay ==
Screenshot of gameplay in That Night, Steeped by Blood River

That Night, Steeped by Blood River is an experimental game and walking simulator played in first-person perspective where players explore rooms and buildings to solve puzzles. Its design is abstract and surrealistic, with doors leading to spaces with completely different designs, and shaders that dramatically shift the colors and design of spaces from room to room.

== Development ==
That Night, Steeped by Blood River was created by American independent developer Taylor Swietanski, a game design graduate at Drexel University in Philadelphia. Swietanski started development with the aim to create an abstract, non-linear game that would elicit "emotions", "feelings or energies" from the player, naming these objectives as an "emotional beat sheet". Describing the game as a "personal" work that was "cathartic and emotionally laborious", Swietanski used her "painful real-life experiences and dreams" as a reference point for in-game settings and events. The game was designed using Unity and Probuilder, with Swietanski using LMMS and FMOD for the game's audio, and Adobe Photoshop for the visual assets.

== Reception ==
Describing the game as "one of the most interesting-looking games I can remember", John Walker of Kotaku praised the game's "unique" aesthetic and "excellent" soundtrack, comparing it to the visual design of The Sentinel and "trippy" educational illustrations from the 1970s. Natalie Clayton of Rock Paper Shotgun similarly described the game as "gorgeous", highlighting its "ephemeral, anxious mood", "effortlessly stylish transitions" and evocations of liminal spaces. Clayton also extolled the game's "stark colors and shimmering worlds" for PC Gamer as an example of independent games with experimental visual design. Describing the game's visual presentation as a set of "eye-searing abstractions", Steven Ngyuen of Fanbyte commended the game's "calm and contemplative" music, and "ethereal" atmosphere. Softonic stated the game's "unique approach to storytelling sets it apart in the genre, providing an engaging experience that resonates with those who appreciate narrative depth". Game designer and researcher Pippin Barr and historian David Wolinsky discussed That Night, Steeped by Blood River, with Barr stating the game was "wonderfully psychedelic". Wolinsky felt that the game "doesn't feel that experimental" and "forced progression in a really rigid way", stating its mechanics "drag you back into this place where you're playing it as a game rather than experiencing it as a dream".

=== Accolades ===
That Night, Steeped by Blood River received a nomination for the Nuovo Award at the 2021 Independent Games Festival.
