= Save the Date (video game) =

2013 video game

- Developer: Paper Dino
- Designer: Chris Cornell
- Composer: Francisco Cerda
- Engine: Ren'Py
- Platforms: Windows, Linux, Macintosh
- Release: 27 May 2013
- Genre: Visual novel
- Mode: Single-player

Save the Date is a 2013 video game by independent developer Paper Dino. It is a visual novel in which the player attempts to take their romantic interest, Felicia, on a date, invariably ending in Felicia's death. Upon replaying the game, players receive additional dialog options reflecting the player character's awareness that they are in a time loop, with the revised objective of protecting Felicia or convincing her that she is a character in a video game. Save the Date received positive reception upon release, with critics praising the depth of the game's concept and its humour. Following release, the game received academic attention for the use of repetition and metafiction in its narrative. The game was nominated for the Nuovo Award at the 2014 Independent Games Festival.

== Gameplay ==
Dialogue is progressed through multiple choice selection. Additional options, reflecting the player's awareness of the game's events, appear on successive playthroughs.

The game is a crossover of a visual novel and a dating sim, in which gameplay consists of branching narrative paths via dialog, where the story is propelled forward by selecting questions and the characters' narrative branches are guided by multiple choice possibilities. The player is an unnamed character who prepares to go on a date with his romantic interest, Felicia. Felicia calls the player and prompts the player to suggest the location of the date. No matter the location or circumstances of the date, the date ends with the death of Felicia through a series of increasingly violent and absurd circumstances, such as Felicia dying from an allergic reaction, caught in a gas explosion or attacked by ninjas. Felicia's death results in a game over, requiring the player to restart the game and pursue a different set of choices.

As the player restarts the game and replays certain sequences, additional dialogue options become available that reflect the player character's awareness of being in a time loop. These sequences include dialogue that attempts to protect Felicia from fatal incidents, or convince her that the player has foresight of the future, ultimately aiming to convince her that she is a character in a video game.

If the player is able to convince Felicia that she is in a video game and fated to die, Felicia suggests to the player to abandon the game and imagine it having a happy ending, shortly before being hit by a meteorite. The only choice that does not lead in death is the first choice presented at the start of the game: to call off the date, leading the player character and Felicia to part ways and move on with their lives.

== Development and release ==
Save the Date was developed by Paper Dino, the studio of independent developer Chris Cornell. Cornell developed the game over a two and a half month period using Ren'Py, a game engine used to create visual novels. He conceived the idea for the game when brainstorming ideas with Frog Fractions developer Jim Crawford, influenced by Groundhog Day a film with a similar time loop premise.

The game's narrative was written with the intent of using a time loop to prompt players to "examine their own motivations" and critically reflect on what it is they want to accomplish while playing the game, with their goal being finishing the game. Cornell supported development by playtesting the game early in the process, observing that many players aimed to approach the game's dialogue with honesty. In 2014, Cornell presented his learnings from developing the game at a session titled Building Player Investment at the Independent Game Summit during the Game Developers Conference.

== Reception ==
=== Critical reception ===
Nathan Grayson of Rock Paper Shotgun considered Save the Date to be "brilliant" and deep, stating it contained a "powerful message about inevitability" and had metafictional qualities, although he balked that "redoing similar bits over and over eventually became sort of annoying". Describing the game as "witty, smart and well thought-out", The Guardian's Cara Ellison complimented Save the Date's "ever-expanding and complex narrative", considering it both "fun and occasionally hilarious". Aaron Souppouris of The Verge stated Save the Date was a "powerful, frustrating game" that is "well-written and ingeniously designed".

=== Academic reception ===
Several academic papers and talks on narrative gaming and interactive storytelling have discussed Save the Date's use of repetition, scene replay, and metafiction. Researchers have also described that Save the Date's narrative devices are novel for the interactive storytelling medium, and present a "considerable challenge" to established narrative conventions.

Interactive fiction writer Emily Short categorised Save the Date as a "replay puzzle", completed by repeating failed attempts. Short stated the game's lack of narrative resolution "gives the player lots of ways to try to change the ending, but no ways that succeed, and the meaning emerges from the trying and the failing" to win. Utrecht School of the Arts researchers have described the game's use of "cross-session memory": where "the player experiences the consequences of decisions made in play sessions completed earlier". Northeastern University researchers discussed the game's nonlinear gameplay using "rewind mechanics", with players encouraged explicitly or implicitly to "replay the game over and over [to look] for a proper solution".

National University of Singapore researcher Alex Mitchell discussed the game's use of metagaming, by creating references to the player's world inside the game to instill "a sense that there is no longer a clear boundary...between the player and the playable character". Mitchell states that the game subverts player expectations about its purpose, shifting towards an awareness in the breakdown of "boundaries between individual play sessions" through a process described as defamiliarization.

=== Accolades ===
Save the Date was nominated for the Nuovo Award at the 2014 Independent Games Festival, and included in the selection for the IndieCade festival in 2013.
