= Daniel Benmergui =

Argentina independent video game designer

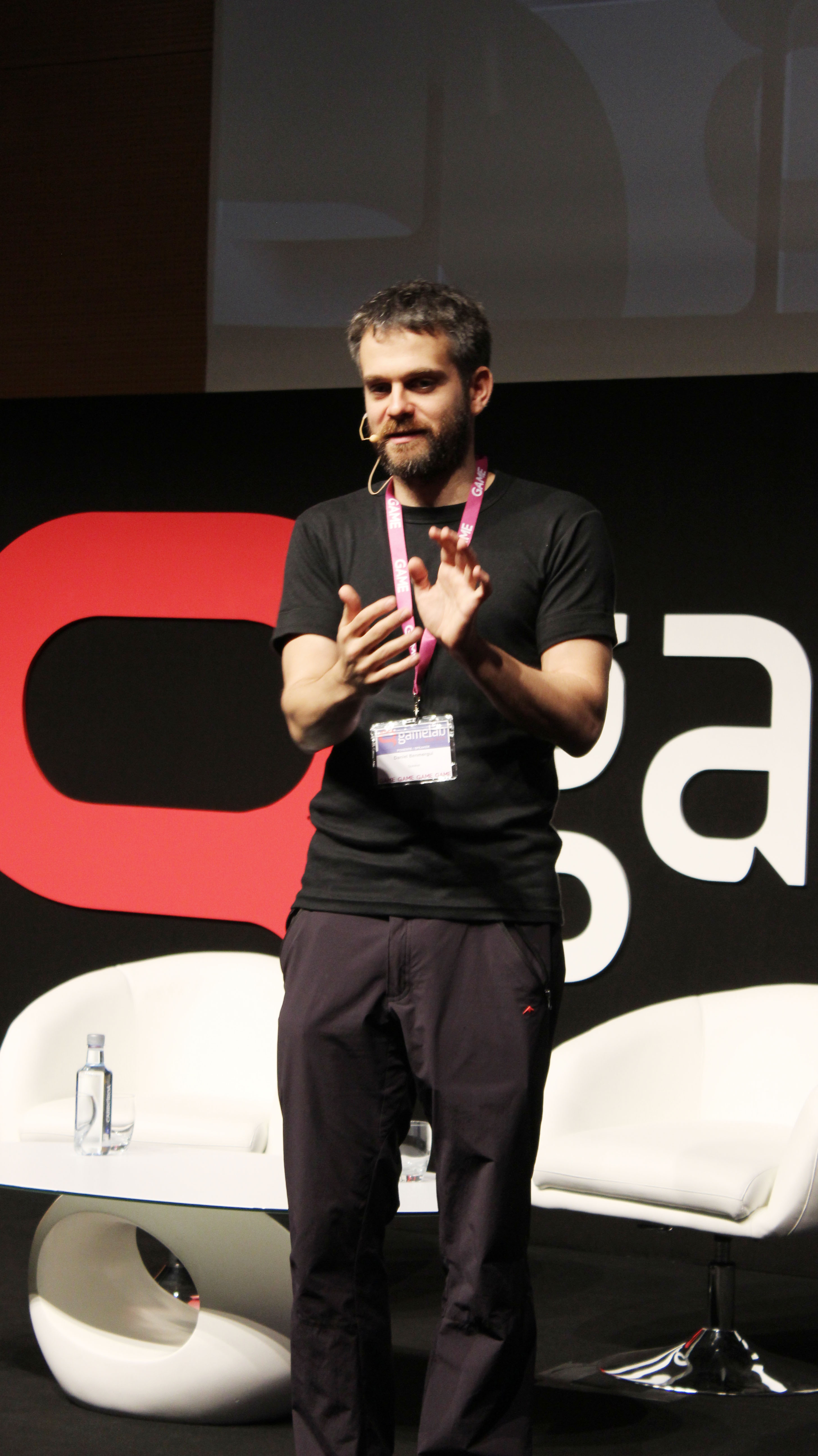
- Benmergui at the 2018 Gamelab Congreso Videojuegos
- Occupation: Game developer

Daniel Benmergui is an independent game designer from Buenos Aires, Argentina known for the creation of art games such as Today I Die, I Wish I Were the Moon, and Storyteller.

== Life and career ==
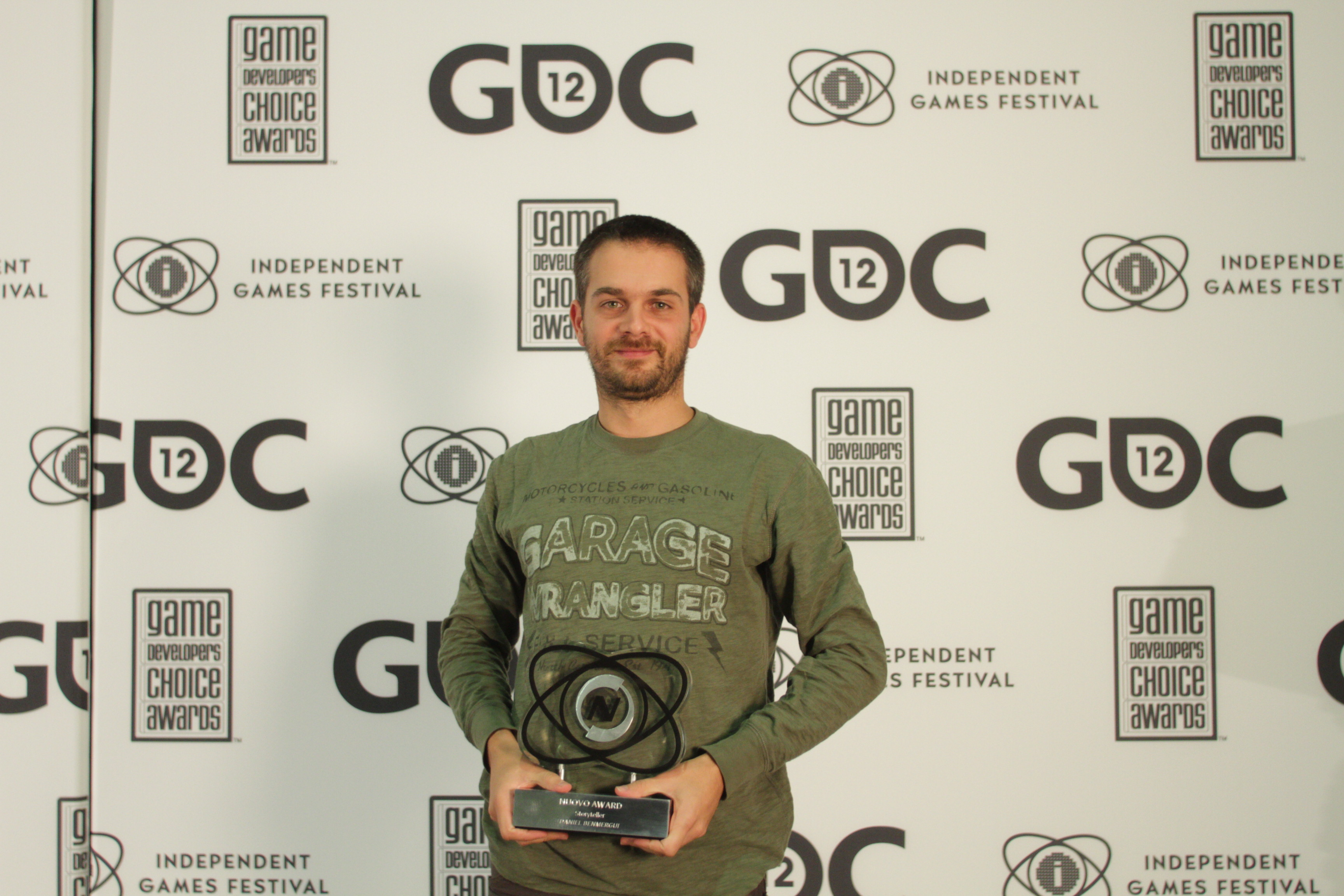
Benmergui at the 2012 Independent Games Festival

Benmergui grew up at his childhood home in a rural area inland in Argentina. Benmergui spent much of his childhood exploring outdoors, and hanging out with much older children from his neighborhood.

Before becoming an independent game developer, Benmergui was a development director at the French mobile game studio Gameloft, managing more than 120 game developers. When asked by Timothy Courtney about his time spent at Gameloft, Benmergui stated "My job was to define and enforce policies on how things are supposed to be done, as well as help with complicated technical problems. I became wiser on how to deal with people, something I am quickly unlearning now!"; Benmergui eventually left his job at a AAA game studio to focus on independent games. Benmergui went on to focus his full-time efforts on I Wish I Were the Moon, calling this time "an emotional revolution".

Between 2008–2009, Benmergui created six games, which most notably included I Wish I Were the Moon, Today I Die, and Storyteller. This was a turning point in Benmergui's career. When asked if he had cycles of creative passion, Benmergui replied "Exactly that: cycles. Sometimes I am productive designing, others programming, others just thinking, and yet others in which I'm not very productive at anything. It is frustrating how at the mercy of our emotional states we are sometimes."

Benmergui is one of the co-heads of the game presentation session Experimental Gameplay Workshop, held yearly at the GDC.

== Awards ==
Today I Die was chosen as a finalist for the Nuovo Award at the 2010 Independent Games Festival. His multiple-game package Moon Stories was awarded the Jury Award at Indiecade 2009 and was featured at the Sense of Wonder Night 2008 in Tokyo. Storyteller won the IGF Nuovo award in 2012.

== Games ==
- Storyteller (2008)
- I Wish I Were the Moon (2008)
- Night Raveler and the Heartbroken Uruguayans (2008)
- Secret of Software 64 (2008)
- The Trials (2008)
- Today I Die (2009)
- Ernesto - A Quick RPG (2013)
- Fidel Dungeon Rescue (2017)
- Fidel (2017)
- Storyteller (2023)
- Dragonsweeper (2025)
