= Mu Cartographer =

2016 video game

- Steam cover art
- Developer: Titouan Millet
- Engine: Unity
- Platforms: Windows, MacOS
- Release: 11 February 2016
- Genre: Puzzle
- Mode: Single-player

Mu Cartographer is a puzzle game released by Dutch independent developer Titouan Millet for Windows and MacOS in 2016. Described by Millet as an "experimental exploration game that can be enjoyed as an interactive visual toy", the game requires the player to navigate a landscape by learning how to use the interface of a machine. Mu Cartographer was met with a generally favorable reception by reviewers. Praise was directed toward the visual presentation and cryptic design, with criticism focusing on the intuitiveness of the mechanics. Following its release, the game was nominated for several awards at the 2017 Independent Games Festival.

== Gameplay ==
Screenshot of Mu Cartographer, depicting the user interface.

Mu Cartographer is a puzzle game in which the player navigates a visualization of a procedurally generated landscape using an abstract user interface of a machine. The interactive elements of the interface allow the player to manipulate the visualization in a consistent and predictable way, such as altering its shape, position, and perspective. However, the interface lacks instructions, with the player being required to "learn how to use the machine" to discover hidden features and structures. The game has a loose narrative, with single-sentence fragments of diary entries from other explorers.

== Development ==
Mu Cartographer was developed by Dutch-based independent developer Titouan Millet, a French graduate in video game art. Millet had developed Mu Cartographer over the course of one year. The game originated as "a visual experiment" with shaders which Millet wanted to work upon further "to make it more than just a visual tool". Millet cited MirrorMoon EP, an independent game by Santa Ragione, as an inspiration for the development of Mu Cartographer, stating that the game adopted a similar approach to "learning to use an interface (and) interact with a machine" without a tutorial. An early version of Mu Cartographer was exhibited by Millet at the Experimental Gameplay Workshop at the 2016 Game Developers Conference, a showcase of experimental game prototypes from independent developers.

== Reception ==
Mu Cartographer received praise from reviewers. Writing for Kill Screen, Daniel Fries praised the visual presentation of the game, noting the use of "brilliant colors", "intangible and unstable" landscapes, and the "obscure complexity of its graphical interface". He also stated that the game's abstract representation of its landscapes was evocative of a radar display and "makes the world feel more real". Robert Purchese of Eurogamer highlighted the game's worldbuilding, praising the "wonderful power" in its "scarcity of information" and its capacity to "take you somewhere else ... (and) gently, calmly, reveal a story about the world you're in."

Some critics provided a more indifferent assessment, expressing frustration with the mechanics as unintuitive. In a mixed review, Laura Michet of Fanbyte praised the "genuinely experimental" design and "very simple, but quite atmospheric" storytelling, although she found the initial experience "frustrating", citing "moments of difficulty that seemed accidental, or somehow not part of the designed challenge." Writing for GamesRadar+, Alayna Cole similarly noted the "lack of immediate feedback in the game can also be frustrating", citing "a point early on where I did what I thought I should do, but the game didn't respond to me, so I assumed that I'd misunderstood", although she praised the game for its sense of discovery and potential for collaborative play.

=== Accolades ===
Mu Cartographer was shortlisted for 'Excellence in Visual Art' and nominated as a finalist for the 'Nuovo Award' at the 2017 Independent Games Festival.
