= Cibele (video game) =

2015 video game

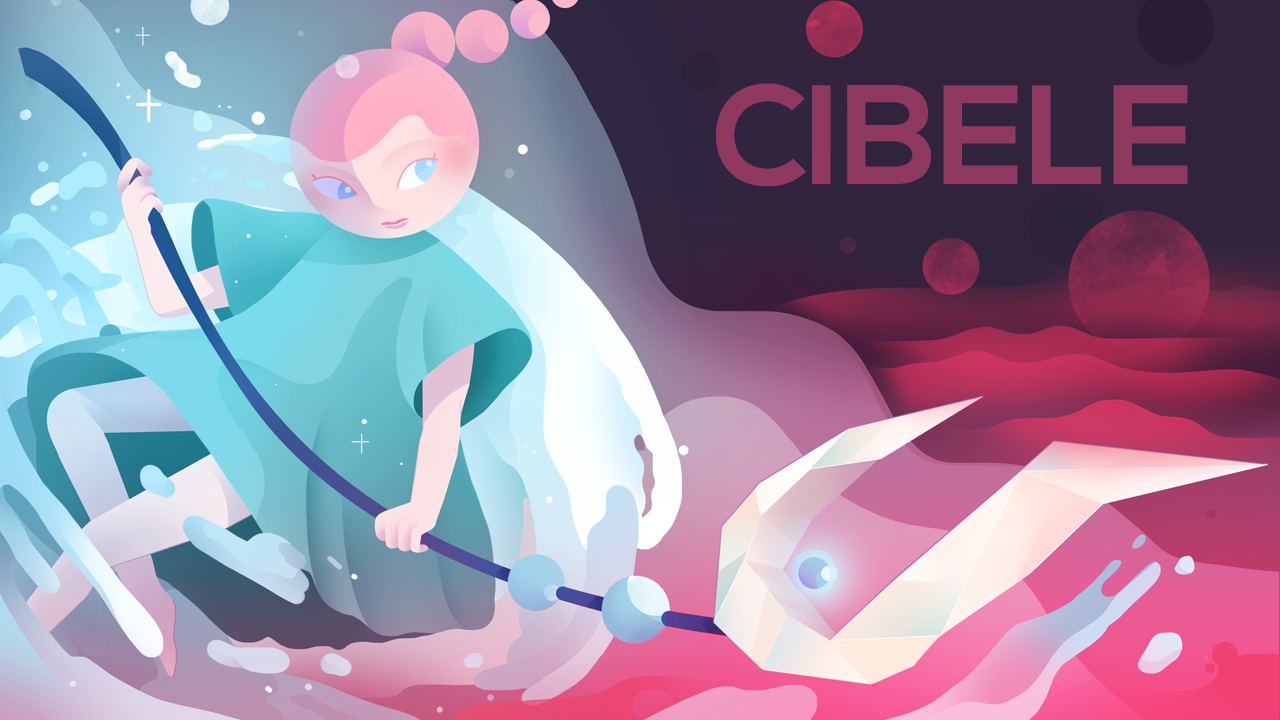
- Developer: Star Maid Games
- Designer: Nina Freeman
- Programmer: Emmett Butler
- Artist: Rebekka Dunlap
- Writer: Nina Freeman
- Composer: Decky Coss
- Engine: Unity
- Platforms: Microsoft Windows, MacOS
- Release: 2015
- Genre: Adventure
- Mode: Single-player

Cibele is a 2015 adventure video game about a romance developed through an online multiplayer game.

== Gameplay ==
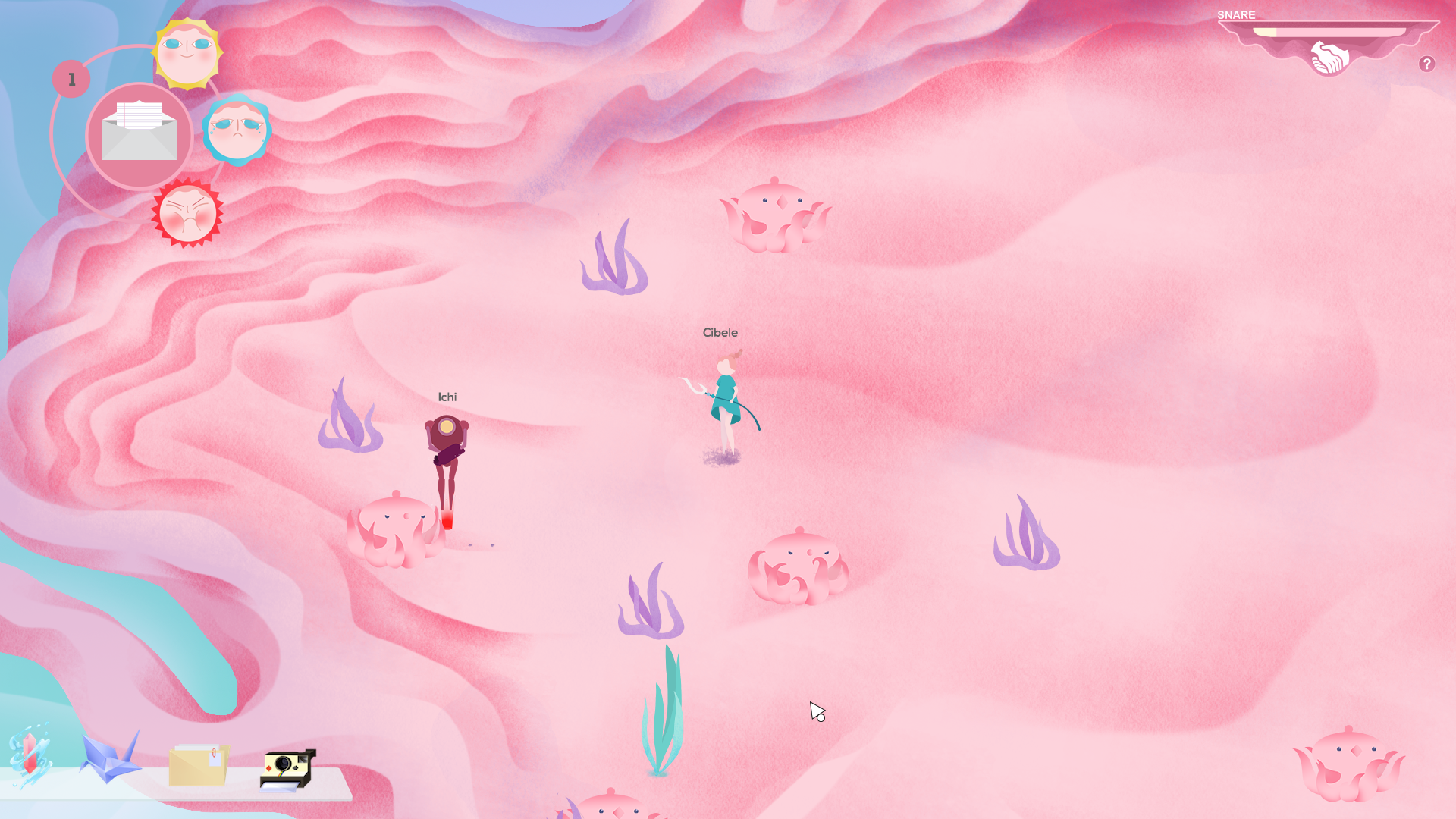
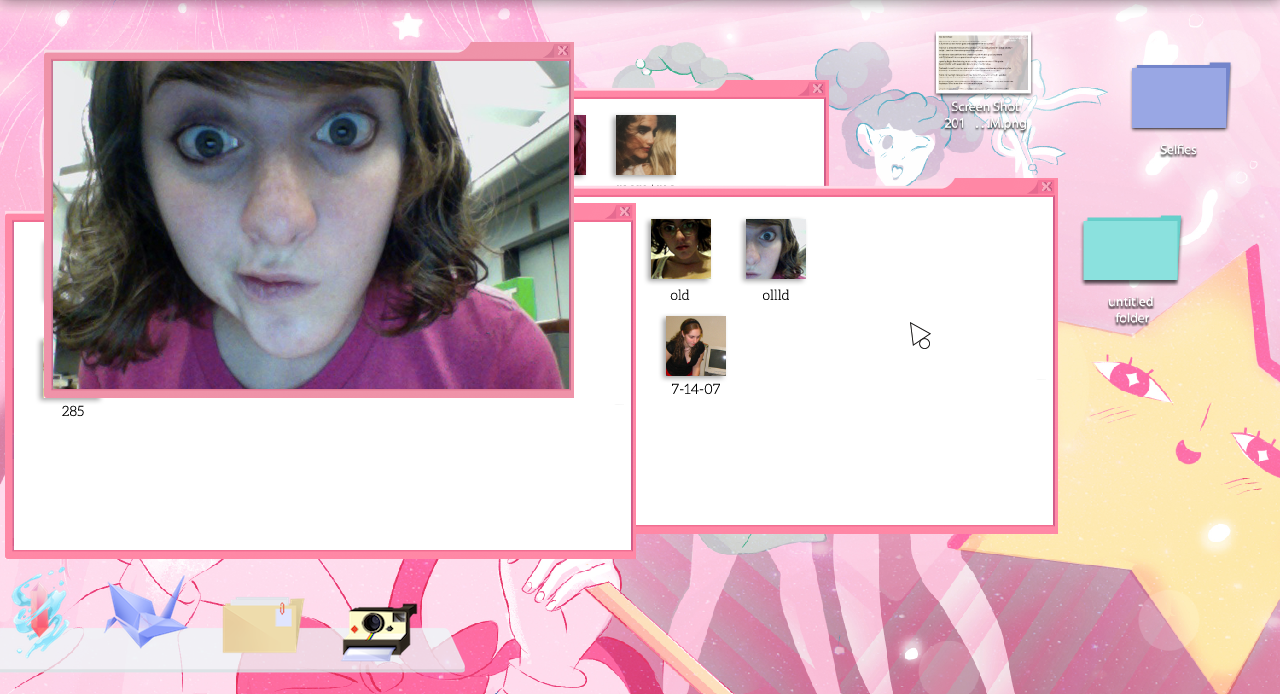
Screenshot of gameplay

Cibele is an adventure video game in which the player navigates a simulated desktop computer interface to follow a budding online romance. The story is based on the experiences of Nina Freeman, the game designer, and its simulated environment is that of her personal computer. In Cibele, the player can rummage through Freeman's personal files, including emails, photos, and journals, and pursue quests in a mock massively multiplayer online role-playing game (MMORPG) to advance the story. The mock multiplayer game, Valtameri, is designed to be incidental to the relationship that develops between Nina and Blake. The game's story is divided into three acts spanning six months. The two begin as part of a team of Valtameri players but eventually spend more time without the group. As the game advances, they share compliments and contact information and decide to meet in person, outside of the mock multiplayer game.

== Development ==
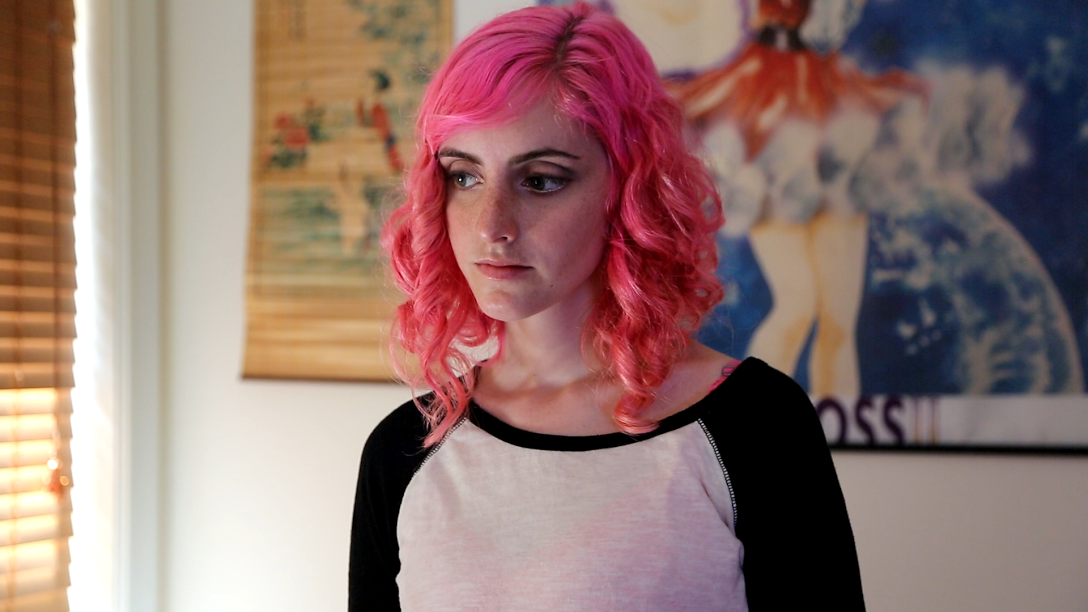
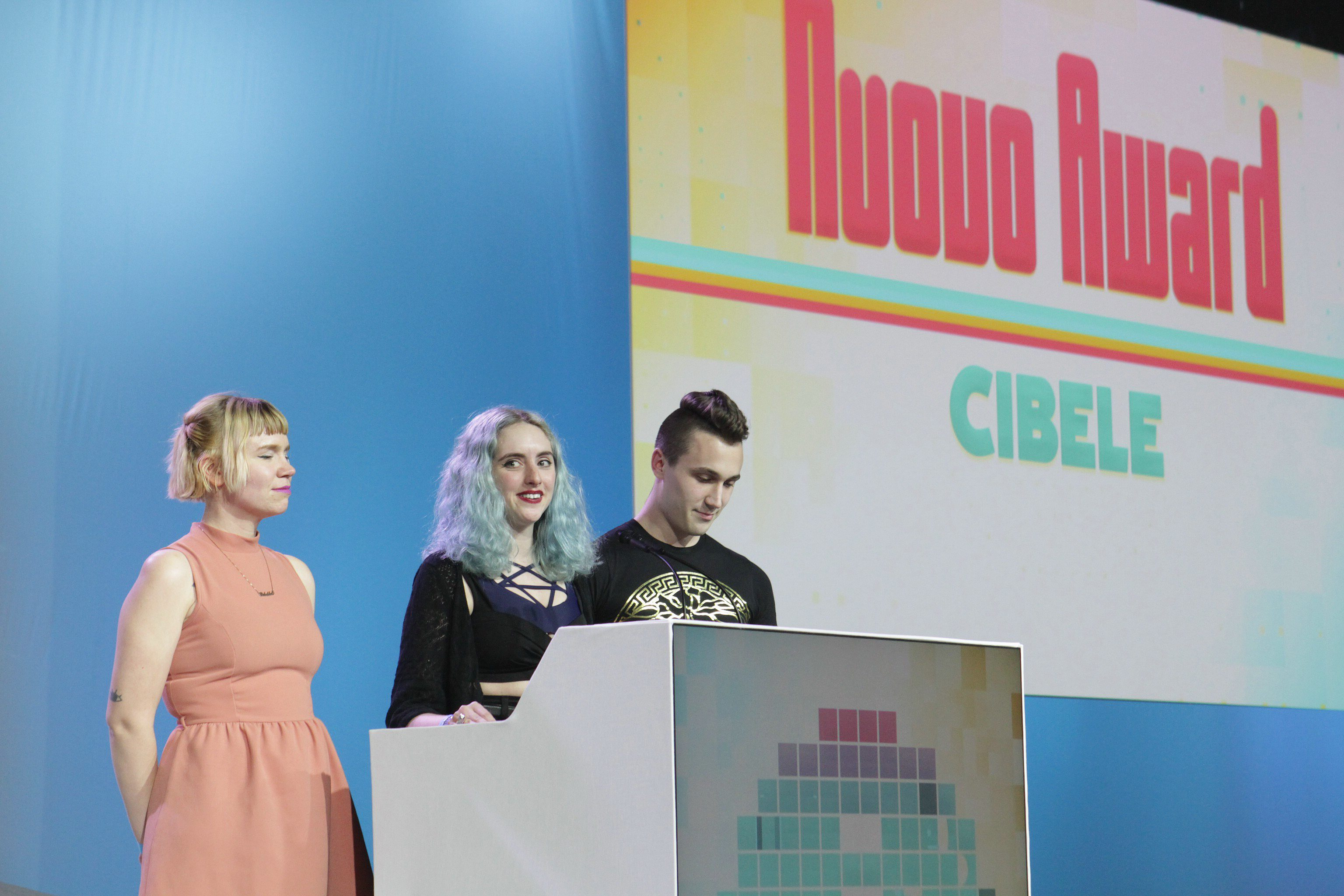
Nina Freeman (top), Freeman accepts the Nuovo Award at the 2016 Independent Games Festival (bottom)

The events of Cibele descend from the experiences of its designer, Nina Freeman. The story is based on her first love interest and sexual encounter, a relationship that developed through the massively multiplayer online role-playing game Final Fantasy XI. Freeman's avatar was named Cibele.

The in-game mock-MMO uses terminology drawn from Finnish mythology, with areas named after mythical figures such as Hiisi and Iku-Turso: Valtameri itself is the Finnish word for 'Ocean'. Many of the game's assets, such as photos and chat transcripts, are artifacts from Freeman's relationship.

Freeman's previous games were also based on personal, intimate experiences.

Cibele was released by Star Maid Games.

== Reception ==
Reception

Aggregate score
Aggregator	Score
Metacritic	71/100

Review score
Publication	Score
Game Informer	7.75/10
