= Enviro-Bear 2000 =

2009 video game

- itch.io version header art
- Developer: Justin Smith
- Composer: Roberto Ricioppo
- Engine: Haaf's Game Engine, Box2D
- Platforms: Windows, iOS, Android
- Release: 4 April 2009
- Genre: Action
- Mode: Single-player

Enviro-Bear 2000 (subtitled Operation: Hibernation in later releases) is a 2009 video game by Canadian independent developer Justin Smith. The game is a mixture of action, racing and survival genres as the player, who is a bear, attempts to drive a car around a forest to collect enough food to hibernate for the winter.

== Gameplay ==
A screenshot of Enviro-Bear 2000.

Using the cursor, the player must single-handedly operate the vehicle using the gas pedal, brake and steering wheel. The objective of the game is to eat enough food to hibernate over the winter by hitting or running over objects that fall into the car, such as fish in a lake or berries from a bush. Colliding or running into some objects creates clutter in the car that the player must throw away using the cursor to prevent interference with driving. Each round of the game is time-limited to represent the onset of winter, by which time the bear must have consumed enough food and find shelter. Described as "purposely awkward to control", the challenge in the game is based on attempting to complete multiple tasks at once whilst using one hand at a time. If the player is successful in hibernating, the time limit restarts and the bear returns for another round of seeking food for the following year.

== Development ==
Enviro-Bear 2000 was developed in two months in response to a game jam on TIGSource titled 'Cockpit Competition', in which developers were invited to create a game centred around cockpits in less than a month. The game was initially uploaded to Game Jolt on 4 April 2009, and received the most votes from TIGSource users as the favorite from the competition.

Enviro-Bear 2000 was originally intended by developer Justin Smith to be a game involving "driving a car through a post-apocalyptic wasteland, attacking other squirrel cars to take their nuts. Due to the one-month time constraint with the game jam, Smith decided to narrow the scope of the game to focus on one bear. Smith stated the hand-grabbing mechanic of the game was inspired by a test application in the engine Box2D, which allowed him to "grab simple shapes with your mouse and fling them around while experimenting with all the features of the physics engine." Smith drew the game's art by hand in Microsoft Paint, allowing the rudimentary visuals to be a reflection of his expectation that the game would be a "complete failure".

After a month of further development, the game was also released on iOS on 8 July 2009 as Enviro-Bear 2010. The app version of the game was periodically updated in 2011 to add support for the iPad and in 2014 to add support for widescreen devices.

== Reception ==
Enviro-Bear 2000 received positive reception from critics. Writing for Kotaku, Heather Alexandra praised the game's "mixture of comedic gameplay and complicated controls", stating the game was a "silly but smart experiment that's a ton of fun". The website later listed the game as the "weirdest car video game" of all time. Sean Bell for DarkZero praised Enviro-Bear 2000 as "the funniest game of all time", praising the "ridiculous amount of humorous touches waiting to be discovered" in the game. Adam Fimio of Indie Game Reviewer stated "the graphics aren't great, but they do what needs doing", though noting "the scaled back visuals actually sell the (pretty goofy) concept", but stated the game was "high on fun".

=== Accolades ===
Enviro-Bear 2000 was a finalist in the 'Nuovo' category at the 2010 Independent Games Festival, a category intended to "honor abstract, short-form, and unconventional game development which advances the medium and the way we think about games." The jury panel praised the game for its "joyfully off the wall, grin-inducing concept and art direction", and the "genuinely novel gameplay idea of having a time management approach to limited player controls". The game also won the 'Most Fantastic' award at the 2010 Fantastic Arcade Festival, an independent games festival presented in Austin, Texas, as a parallel event to the Fantastic Fest. Enviro-Bear 2000 received a cabinet display at the event and was attended by developer Justin Smith.
