= Today I Die =

2008 video game

- Developer: Daniel Benmergui
- Composer: Hernan Rozenwasser
- Platforms: Browser, Flash
- Release: 2008
- Genres: Puzzle game, artgame
- Mode: Single-player

Today I Die is a short 2008 Flash game created by Argentine game designer Daniel Benmergui. It received positive reviews from publications.

== Gameplay Overview ==
The game has been classified as an art game and requires the player to pull apart and reconstruct a poem by clicking on a number of words contained within it, changing its narrative meaning piece by piece. Kevin Veale has referred to it as an example of "interactive cinema."

== Reception ==
The game was chosen as a finalist for the Nuovo Award for innovative games at the 2010 Independent Games Festival and also chosen for the Experimental Gameplay Workshop in 2009. Gus Mastrapa of the website The A.V. Club called it "imaginative" but called the nostalgia-inducing graphics "heavy-handed".
