= Dreamcore (video game) =

2025 video game

- Developer: Montraluz
- Publisher: Tlön Industries
- Designer: Valentín Iribarren
- Engine: Unreal Engine 5
- Platforms: Windows; PlayStation 5; Xbox Series X/S
- Release: January 23, 2025
- Genres: Horror, adventure
- Mode: Single-player

Dreamcore is a 2025 first-person horror video game developed by Argentine studio Montraluz and published by Tlön Industries. It was released for Windows, PlayStation 5, and Xbox Series X/S on January 23, 2025. Developed in Unreal Engine 5, the game uses a body-camera and found-footage visual style and has players navigate non-linear, labyrinthine liminal spaces to find each level's exit.

== Gameplay ==
Dreamcore is played from a first-person perspective and emphasizes exploration and wayfinding through maze-like liminal spaces. The player navigates each level by observing environmental details, visual cues, and sounds in order to find an exit, rather than through combat or enemy encounters.

The game is divided into five levels: "Dreampools", an indoor pool complex; "Eternal Suburbia", a neighborhood of similar houses and looping paths; "Playrooms", a series of children's play areas; "Liminal Hotel", a multi-floor hotel connected by corridors and elevators; and "Dead Mall", an abandoned shopping mall. Several levels include light puzzle elements and trial-and-error navigation, while "Dead Mall" was designed around more open exploration with fewer mandatory objectives. The game uses a body-camera, found-footage presentation with VHS-inspired visual effects, and was developed in Unreal Engine 5.

== Development ==
Dreamcore was created by Valentín Iribarren, who began developing the game in mid-2022 after experimenting with Unreal Engine 5. Press Over reported that Iribarren had previously created maps for Counter-Strike: Global Offensive and that the game drew on his interest in Valve games, internet creepypasta, and The Backrooms. Destructoid described the game as influenced by analog horror and liminal-space horror.

A Steam demo was available by 2023, and a trailer was later shown during the 2024 Latin American Games Showcase. Following release, Montraluz added additional levels to the game as free updates for existing owners. "Playrooms" was released in June 2025, after being announced for June 17 and then released early during the Latin American Games Showcase. "Liminal Hotel" followed on November 14, 2025. The final post-launch level, "Dead Mall", was released on May 21, 2026, completing the game's five planned chapters.

== Release and reception ==
Reception

Aggregate score
Aggregator	Score
Metacritic	PC: 56/100

Review scores
Publication	Score
DayOne	8.2/10
TheXboxHub	3.5/5
Bloody Disgusting	1/5

Dreamcore was released for Windows, PlayStation 5, and Xbox Series X/S on January 23, 2025. At launch, the game contained two levels, "Dreampools" and "Eternal Suburbia", with three additional levels planned as free post-launch additions. The final post-launch level, "Dead Mall", was released on May 21, 2026, completing the game's planned five-level lineup.

The PC version received "mixed or average" reviews according to Metacritic. Reviewers were divided over whether the game's minimal interaction and maze-like design strengthened or weakened its atmosphere. Győző "FairyEmpire" Baki of DayOne praised the game's atmosphere, photorealistic surrealism, and "Dreampools" level design, while noting that its repetition, navigation, and walking-focused gameplay would not appeal to all players. Gareth Brierley of TheXboxHub called the game unconventional and praised its visuals and sound design, but wrote that its lack of clear objectives and traditional gameplay mechanics might frustrate some players. Harrison Abbott of Bloody Disgusting was more critical, arguing that the game's puzzles relied on trial-and-error wayfinding and that its VHS-style presentation did not compensate for repetitive exploration.

Writing for GameSpot, Mark Delaney discussed Dreamcore as part of a broader trend of liminal-space walking simulators, arguing that the subgenre can make exploration itself a source of horror without relying on enemies, chase sequences, or fail states.
