= Pagan: Autogeny =

2019 video game

- itch.io cover art
- Developer: Oleander Garden
- Platform: Windows
- Release: 14 August 2019
- Genre: Role-playing video game
- Mode: Single-player

Pagan: Autogeny is a video game by Canadian independent developer Oleander Garden. Described as an "experimental first-person open-world role-playing video game set in the digital ruins of an abandoned massively multiplayer online role playing game", Autogeny is the third game in Garden's Pagan trilogy. The game received praise from several critics, with several raising attention to the unique exploration of themes around identity and gender.

== Gameplay ==
Screenshot

The player assumes the role of VIVIAN, a player in a fictitious massively multiplayer online role-playing game titled PLAZA96, who is left to explore and interact with the remaining inhabitants of the game. The game assumes the conventions of online games, with a mixture of simple combat and puzzle mechanics. The role-playing features of the game include a stats-based leveling system that allows players to build on attributes such as 'Estrogen', 'Poetry', 'Body Forging', and 'Caffeine', and a tarot-based equipment system that allows players to further manipulate their attributes. The game is open-ended and features five explorable zones with hidden areas across "over 100 acres of handcrafted playable space".

== Development ==
Oleander Garden stated that the design of Pagan: Autogeny "unfolded gradually" and was not the product of a clear idea or concept. The game was inspired by Garden's experience of online games as "digital landscapes" that "transcend the normal boundaries of games" and reflect spaces that are "bound up" in memories and experiences. Garden stated the design ideas in Autogeny were directly inspired by or lifted from several adventure games, including Shadow of the Comet and Ultima: Worlds of Adventure 2: Martian Dreams. They described their expression of the themes of the game as "a way of engaging with ideas of self-creation and social identity in a sustained and unstructured way, at a time where that was, incidentally, extraordinarily useful to me."

== Reception ==
Pagan: Autogeny received praise by several critics. Writing for Indie Games Plus, Joel Couture stated that the game was a "captivating, if heavy experience", stating "it's in its loneliness that the game is at its most powerful." Emily Rose of RE:BIND praised the game for merging its "gameplay mechanics into the narrative in a seamless fashion" and "choosing to show the gloomier and more spiritual side of internet culture." Several critics also discussed the significance of the themes of identity in Autogeny, some proposing the game depicts the "complete expression" of "gender transition and the psychological condition of a person struggling with it." Jeremy Signor of Unwinnable described the game's themes as "inexorably queer", stating that Autogeny's representation of its characters and their identities depict "a plane of existence for trans women to explore themselves, to interact with other trans women, to mess around with the character creator as they forge bodies that they may not be able to as easily outside of the computer space." In contrast, Emily Rose of RE:BIND stated that "While it would be easy to read too deeply into certain elements of the game and deduce a straightforward commentary on topics like dysphoria, it's clear on a complete run that PAGAN is actually interested in a more broadly applicable subtext regarding the foundations of identity as a whole."

=== Accolades ===
Autogeny was an entrant in the Independent Games Festival held at the 2020 Game Developers Conference, and was a finalist for the 'Nuovo Award', given in "celebration of more esoteric and artful games".
