= Mediterranea Inferno =

2023 video game

- Developer: Eyeguys
- Publisher: Santa Ragione
- Designer: Lorenzo Redaelli
- Platforms: Windows; Macintosh; Nintendo Switch; PlayStation 4; PlayStation 5; Xbox One; Xbox Series
- Release: Windows, Mac: WW: 24 August 2023; Switch, PlayStation, Xbox: WW: 5 March 2024
- Genre: Visual Novel
- Mode: Single-player

Mediterranea Inferno is a 2023 video game created by independent developer Eyeguys and published by Santa Ragione. The game received generally positive reviews from critics, and won the Excellence in Narrative award at the 2024 Independent Games Festival.

== Development ==
Eyeguys, whose real name is Lorenzo Redaelli, wanted to deconstruct the image of a typical Italian summer holiday. He used Milan as the backdrop for his story and set it in a period shortly after the lifting of COVID-19 restrictions in Italy.

== Reception ==
Reception

Aggregate score
Aggregator	Score
Metacritic	84%

Review scores
Publication	Score
Edge	8/10
Eurogamer	5/5
PlayStation Official Magazine – UK	9/10
The Games Machine (Italy)	8.5/10
IGN Italy	8/10
Multiplayer.it	8/10

According to review aggregator Metacritic, Mediterranea Inferno received "generally favorable" reviews, receiving positive coverage from critics. Eurogamer named the game as the fifth best game of 2023. Mediterranea Inferno won the Excellence in Narrative award at the 2024 Independent Games Festival, and received a nomination for the Seumas McNally Grand Prize and Nuovo Award.

== See also ==
- Milky Way Prince: The Vampire Star, the first game by Lorenzo Redaelli
