= Save the Day =

Save the Day may refer to:

- Save the Day, a video game developed by Scottish company Denki
- "Save the Day" (The Living End song) (1998)
- "Save the Day" (Mariah Carey song), featuring Lauryn Hill (2020)
- "Save the Day" (SZA song) (2026)
- "Save the Day", a song by Selena Gomez from Stars Dance (2013)
- "Save the Day", a song by Ski Mask the Slump God and Jacquees featuring Coi Leray and LouGotCash from Spider-Man: Into the Spider-Verse
- Saves the Day, a New Jersey rock band
