= Judero =

2024 video game

- Developers: Talha and Jack Co.
- Publishers: Talha and Jack Co.
- Designers: Jack King-Spooner; Talha Kaya
- Composers: Jack King-Spooner; Talha Kaya
- Engine: Unity
- Platforms: Windows, macOS, Xbox One, Xbox Series X/S, PlayStation 5, Nintendo Switch
- Release: Windows, MacOS: WW: September 16, 2024; Xbox One, Xbox Series X/S, PlayStation 5: WW: October 3, 2025; Nintendo Switch: WW: May 28, 2026
- Genres: Action-adventure, hack and slash
- Mode: Single-player

Judero is a 2024 action-adventure video game developed by Jack King-Spooner and Talha Kaya, under the name Talha and Jack Co. Set in a fantastical depiction of the Scottish Borders, the player controls Judero, a Celtic warrior with the ability to control enemies with his mind. The game was noted for its use of stop-motion animation, with all the character graphics being based on real life clay models.

== Gameplay ==
Judero features melee combat against enemies, with the ability to use magic to temporarily possess and take control of enemies, which is often linked to puzzles for the player to surpass.

== Development ==
All of the assets in Judero were physically handcrafted and animated via stop-motion techniques before being placed into the game. The game was funded via Kickstarter and the UK Games Fund. Judero was the first game King-Spooner had developed in collaboration with any other individuals, noting that he had "went all kinds of grumpy trying to finish a game by myself during the pandemic". He described the possession mechanic as being inspired by the Kirby series.

In June 2024, the game was shown at the Future Game Show.

== Reception ==
Reception

Aggregate score
| Aggregator | Score |
|---|---|
| Metacritic | (PC) 81/100 |

Review scores
| Publication | Score |
|---|---|
| Destructoid | 8/10 |
| PC Gamer (US) | 83/100 |

The PC version of Judero received generally favorable reviews from critic, according to the review aggregation website Metacritic.

Judero was met with positive critical reception. Writing for Polygon, Ian Walker described it as "special in a way video games often no longer aspire to be, melding the developers' artistic sensibilities with the unique interactivity of the medium". PC Gamer described it as "a game with the kind of rough edges and pleasant surprises that could only come from a genuine artistic vision". Despite criticizing some of the gameplay mechanics, it was summarized as "funky, weird, rough and wonderful in a way only such a small, ambitious project could be", receiving a score of 83/100. Steven Scaife of Slant rated it 4/5, praising the ties between the game's art style and its storytelling, describing it as "an often beautiful treatise on what humanity creates to understand the world". Destructoid rating the game 8/10, noted the game's disconnected narrative makes "it very difficult to really tell you why Judero is such a successful game and why you should play it".

The game received an Honourable Mention at the 2024 A MAZE festival.
