= Dinner Date (video game) =

2010 video game

- The logo for Dinner Date
- Developers: Stout Games; Jeroen D. Stout
- Programmer: Jeroen D. Stout
- Artist: Jeroen D. Stout
- Writer: Jeroen D. Stout
- Composer: Than van Nispen tot Pannerden
- Engine: Custom Built
- Platform: Microsoft Windows
- Release: Microsoft Windows; November 17, 2010
- Genre: Casual
- Mode: Single-player

Dinner Date is a short, experimental first-person computer game made by Dutch game designer Jeroen D. Stout. It was first released digitally through Stout Games own website. Four months later (March 1, 2011) it was released on Steam. Just like some other indie games (e.g. Dear Esther or The Graveyard) its status as a video game has been disputed, as it requires minimal interaction and the few small choices you make are of no consequence to the story. It does, however, give the player the opportunity to eat, drink and smoke whenever the player wants to, as long as the time isn't up.

== Gameplay and plot ==
The game is a 25 minute long story exploring the subconsciousness of protagonist Julian Luxemburg as he sits by his dinner table set for two, waiting in vain for his date Meiko to arrive. As the night progresses, his thoughts continue to unfold more and his worries are revealed; these worries are not necessarily related to being stood up. Stout himself said in an interview; "It's about exploring the mindset of someone who's being stood up. Playing through the eyes of [the protagonist], you can go through the experience without the complete emotional damage." He further described the game as "...a space to explore the 'things you can't tell your friends'."

== Development ==
The game was written solely by designer Jeroen D. Stout, who also provided the voice acting for the protagonist's subconscious. The score was composed exclusively for the game by Than van Nispen tot Pannerden.

== Reception ==
Dinner Date received mixed reviews, with GameZone saying "As an intellectual experiment, Dinner Date is interesting and even profound. As a meta-narrative about the social constructs that confront the modern man, it fascinates. As a game, it barely qualifies.", captioning a common opinion among game critics that Dinner Date is more of an interactive art piece than a game.
