= The Norwood Suite =

2017 video game

- Developer: Cosmo D
- Publisher: Alliance
- Designer: Greg Heffernan
- Programmer: Greg Heffernan
- Artist: Greg Heffernan
- Composer: Archie Pelago
- Engine: Unity
- Platforms: macOS; Windows
- Release: October 2, 2017 (Win); November 27, 2017 (Mac)
- Genre: Adventure game
- Mode: Single-player

The Norwood Suite is a 2017 adventure game developed by Cosmo D and published by Alliance. Players explore a surreal hotel that was once owned by a famous musician. It is the sequel to Off-Peak and is followed by Tales From Off-Peak City Vol. 1, all of which are set in the same world.

== Gameplay ==
After musician Peter Norwood mysteriously disappears, his mansion is converted into a hotel. The player character is sent to the hotel by Muriel (who first appeared in Off-Peak), and the residents, many of whom are musicians, assume the player to be a member of the staff. The player is free to explore the hotel and can perform various jobs for the residents. The game does not have a loss condition, and consists primarily of exploration, reading dialogue, and solving puzzles. The goal of the game is to attain the pieces of a Peter Norwood costume in order to gain admission to a costume party in the basement of the hotel.

== Development ==
The Norwood Suite is musician and game developer Greg Heffernan's third video game, following Saturn V and Off-Peak, which were released as freeware. When creating characters, Heffernan was influenced by musicians who let their work be influenced by their lives regardless of theatricality. Characters and locations were designed to be believable and natural while still retaining the free-form nature of jazz improvisation. Heffernan likened Norwood himself to Glenn Gould and his namesake hotel to the Hotel Chelsea. Heffernan cited his main themes as "music and artists and artists finding a place in a hostile, shifting environment", though he intentionally left much to player interpretation. Gone Home and Dear Esther inspired Heffernan to focus more on exploration than puzzles and victory conditions, and he cited Thief as a major influence on The Norwood Suite's design. It was released on October 2, 2017. The macOS version was released on November 27, 2017.

== Reception ==
The Norwood Suite received positive reviews on Metacritic. PC Gamer said it "offers up some of the most satisfying immersive sim-style exploration of 2017". IGN said it feels like arriving in a unique and enjoyable form of "actual virtual hell". Describing it as "a walkthrough art piece with a few puzzles and backstories", Adventure Gamers recommended it to fans of surrealism and modern art. Rock Paper Shotgun said its core theme was "learning about music and the creative process" and, in a retrospective review, wrote, "I guarantee you'll have never seen a stranger or more surreal hotel than this."

Rock Paper Shotgun, Slant Magazine, and Vice included it in their best games of 2017, and Rock Paper Shotgun and Slant Magazine included it in the best games of the 2010s.
