= Off-Peak =

2015 video game

- Developer: Cosmo D
- Publisher: Cosmo D
- Designer: Greg Heffernan
- Programmer: Greg Heffernan
- Artist: Greg Heffernan
- Composer: Archie Pelago
- Platforms: Linux; macOS; Windows
- Release: WW: February 15, 2015
- Genre: Adventure game
- Mode: Single-player

Off-Peak is an adventure game developed and published by Cosmo D. Players explore a surreal train station and attempt to leave a dystopian city. It was released as freeware in 2015. It was followed in 2017 by The Norwood Suite, which shares the same setting.

== Gameplay ==
Off-Peak is set in a dystopian city reminiscent of New York City. Players arrive in a train station, attempting to leave a dystopian city. They have no ticket, but learn that a friend has ripped up his ticket and left the pieces scattered in the station. Off-Peak is a first-person adventure game that focuses on exploration. While exploring the station, players will meet characters who will tell them about their lives working in the station, or overhear conversations between other characters.

== Development ==
Greg Heffernan, a professional musician, began making video games in the 2010s under the name Cosmo D. Off-Peak is his second video game. He was looking to create something "satisfying and unsettling at the same time". He was inspired by musician John Zorn to make a surreal world based on improvisation that is grounded in a strong theme. Heffernan credited video games with giving him a "wider creative bandwidth" to talk about life in New York City, people he knew, and the intersection of music and commerce. Heffernan's band, Archie Pelago, provided music for the game. Off-Peak was released as freeware.

== Reception ==
Kill Screen said it was fun to explore and a love letter to Heffernan's influences. Describing it, they said "whether or not this is a videogame, a music video or a mood board is a question with no incorrect answer". In another article, Kill Screen interpreted Off-Peak as warning against the commodification of art. Slant Magazine, which called it weird and beautiful, chose it as one of the best games of 2015.

== See also ==
- Babbdi, another free video game where players attempt to flee a dystopian city via train
