= Nina Freeman =

American video game designer

Nina Marie Freeman
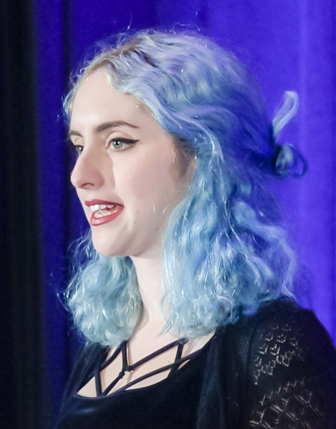
- Speaking at the 2016 Game Developers Conference
- Born: March 15, 1990 (age 36)
- Education: New York University Tandon School of Engineering
- Occupation: Video game designer
- Years active: 2012–present
- Organization: The Code Liberation Foundation
- Notable credit(s): Cibele, Tacoma
- Spouse: Jake Jefferies
- Children: 1
- Website: http://ninasays.so

Nina Marie Freeman (born March 15, 1990) is an American video game designer known for her games with themes of sexuality and self-reflection. A former game designer at Fullbright, she developed and published numerous video games and is a co-founder of the Code Liberation Foundation, a non-for-profit organization that makes an effort to diversify employment within STEAM fields.

== Academic career and personal life ==
While a student at Pace University in Lower Manhattan, New York, Freeman was drawn to the work of Frank O’Hara and other poets of the New York School. She admired how they documented their lives through verses that were witty, conversational, and confessional all at once.

Freeman regularly streams on Twitch.

Freeman resides in Maine with her husband, Jake Jefferies. The couple had a child in 2025.

== Works, awards, and accomplishments ==
Freeman developed her first game in 2012 based on a science fiction poem she wrote, though it remains unreleased.

In 2013, Freeman co-founded the Code Liberation Foundation on International Women's Day, a program offering free development workshops in order to facilitate more women to create video games.

Her game Bum Rush (2016) debuted at NYU Game Center 2015 No Quarter event and was released for free on July 6, 2016, for OS X and Windows.

She was included in Forbes 30 Under 30 2016 list of influential video game industry figures.

Her autobiographical game How Do You Do It? deals with the discovery of sexuality through toy dolls after viewing the movie Titanic. It was developed during the 2014 Global Game Jam and was a finalist at the Independent Games Festival and Indiecade.

In 2015, Freeman released Cibele. The game tells the story of a teenage girl, engaged in a whirlwind online romance with a fellow gamer, and is based on a personal experience she had during her college years. The game gained praise for its characters and intimate stories and received the Nuovo Award at the 2016 Independent Games Festival.

At Fullbright, she worked as a game and level designer for their second release, Tacoma. The game sold fewer copies than the studio's previous game Gone Home, but made enough sales to allow them to continue developing games.

In January 2020, Freeman resigned from Fullbright to focus on her own projects, working on a narrative domestic horror game with her partner, Jake Jefferies.

In 2021, Freeman released Last Call, which was nominated for the Excellence in Narrative award at the 2022 Independent Games Festival.

== Ludography ==
Video Game Credits
Year	Game	Note	Ref(s)
2014	How Do You Do It?		
2015	Cibele		
2017	Kimmy		
2017	Lost Memories Dot Net		
2017	Tacoma	Level design	
2018	Beach Date		
2019	We Met in May		
2021	Last Call		
2022	Nonno’s Legend	Part of the Triennale Game Collection.	
2023	Holy moly Houseplant		
2024	Open Roads	Level design	
2025	Lost Records: Bloom & Rage	Writer	
