= Mewgenics =

2026 video game

- Cover artwork by Sony-Shock
- Developers: Edmund McMillen (Note: Originally Team Meat prior to cancellation in 2016); Tyler Glaiel
- Publishers: Edmund McMillen (Windows); Tyler Glaiel (Windows); Nicalis (Nintendo Switch 2, PS5, Xbox Series X/S)
- Composer: Ridiculon (Note: Music group consisting of Matthias Bossi and Jon Evans)
- Engine: Glaiel Game Engine
- Platforms: Windows; Nintendo Switch 2; PlayStation 5; Xbox Series X/S
- Release: Windows: WW: February 10, 2026; Nintendo Switch 2, PS5, Xbox Series X/S: WW: September 8, 2026
- Genres: Tactical role-playing, roguelike, life simulation
- Mode: Single-player

Mewgenics is a 2026 tactical role-playing roguelike life simulation video game developed by Edmund McMillen and Tyler Glaiel. The gameplay revolves around the process of breeding cats that assume character classes and sending them out on adventures based on a series of tactical combats set up on procedurally-generated grids. Originally announced by Team Meat in 2012 as a follow-up to Super Meat Boy, the game experienced a protracted production cycle that led to a state of development hell, before being cancelled and subsequently reacquired by McMillen for development with Glaiel in 2018. Mewgenics was released for Microsoft Windows on February 10, 2026 and was released by Nicalis for Nintendo Switch 2, PlayStation 5, and Xbox Series X, Series S on September 8, 2026.

Mewgenics was a commercial success, having sold over one million copies within its first week. The game received critical acclaim, with praise for its gameplay, depth, soundtrack, and humor.

== Gameplay ==
Gameplay primarily takes place during combat on a grid (top) and in the house hub where cats live and breed (bottom).

Mewgenics is a tactical role-playing game divided into two stages: combat and cat breeding. At the beginning of the game, the player is assigned a team of four cats, which feature character classes, such as hunter, mage, tank, and fighter. The cats have varying statistics, as well as access to mana reserves, which influence their roles and performance. The cats may be additionally enhanced by equipping clothing and other paraphernalia. The combat portion of the game takes place, principally, on a procedurally-generated grid with a two-dimensional isometric perspective, where the team must eliminate all the enemies before advancing. The combatants may take a move action, use an active ability, and get benefit from passive abilities. The combat is heavily influenced by the environment, including weather and foliage, the latter of which can work for and against the cats. If a cat loses all its hit points, it will be incapacitated yet remain in the battle, though it will suffer long-term consequences in the form of injuries, such as a broken paw, which applies negative stat penalties. An incapacitated cat can still be killed if it takes three additional hits. Should a cat die, its items will be lost, including any exclusive rarities that may only drop once. After a successful battle, a random cat levels up, thereby enhancing its abilities.

Breeding, one of the game's essential mechanics, comes into play once the player has completed their initial run. Surviving cats return to the house hub, inheriting their statistics as well as equipment that may be used by other cats. While cats who finish a run are retired and no longer selectable for further runs, two cats in the same room may mate, resulting in the breeding of a new cat that inherits their parents' traits. Inherited traits may produce cats that are ideal for further runs. Inbreeding, the act of breeding cats with closely related parents, can results in offspring with birth defects tied to inbreeding, which have negative effects tied to them. Cats also have a daily chance to develop mutations. Mutations are not inherently harmful; they typically modify a cat’s stats through trade-offs, such as increasing one stat while reducing another. Some mutations can also grant unique gameplay effects, such as additional turns or level-up rerolls. As simulated in-game time passes, cats die from old age. The player's neighbors will also accept certain cats as gifts and will give the player items or enhancements in return.

== Synopsis ==
Mewgenics is set in Boon County, a mostly-dilapidated area in the United States. The game's story is "pretty light", having the player "do the bidding of an incompetent scientist".

The player character is a cat lady who is defibrillated at the start of the game, by a cat-obsessed scientist named Dr. Thomas A. Beanies. Beanies gives the player two cats before sending them off to their house, with no instructions beyond acquiring as many cats as possible and performing eugenics on them to make them stronger. As the player advances by exploring and battling further away from their house, various threats emerge to attack their house. Eventually, an earthquake shakes Beanies' lab, causing the animals he was experimenting on to drive him out of it. Beanies blames the player for this, and banishes them. However, he promptly recalls them and has them use a time machine in the lab in an attempt to reverse his misfortune. The player uses the machine to travel to the Ice Age and Jurassic period to no avail, prompting Beanies to urge the player to try travelling to the future instead. Even after visiting a mechanized dystopic Nazi future ruled by Adolf Hitler and witnessing the end of the world, time travel fails to produce any change in Beanies' position, so he has the player place antennas crafted from technology harvested from Hitler's minions in the past and future to open a gateway to "the Infinite" to find and kill God.

When God immediately starts regenerating after being defeated by the player, Beanies concludes that the only way to kill God is to "nuke the fetal Christ child". After completing several quests to assemble a nuclear bomb, the player returns to the Infinite to re-confront God and use the bomb to destroy God's "Child", which takes the form of a cat fetus.

Before the bomb is activated, Dr. Beanies appears via hologram to give a speech about his motives to God; 35 years in the past, his pet cat Stacy died, and despite countless attempts to clone her Beanies was unable to truly recreate her. He believes that this is because God took her soul, and now wants to take revenge on God by taking away his child. If the player refuses to activate the bomb, Beanies attempts to convince them to do so by reminding them of the fate of their son, in the process revealing that the player is Magdalene O. Moriah, the mother of Isaac, the protagonist of McMillen's game The Binding of Isaac; if the player continues to refuse, Beanies activates the bomb himself.

As the bomb's timer reaches zero, Beanies appears in the time machine and rescues the player and their cats. However, while returning home, Steven, the protagonist of McMillen's 2009 game Time Fcuk, (Note: Steven first appears earlier in the game to punish save scumming and allow the player to increase the game's difficulty.) appears and attacks and kills Beanies, before returning the player and their cats to a point in time before Beanies started the creation of the nuke.

== Development ==
=== Original design and cancellation ===
The original Mew-Genics prototype featured turn-based arena combat.

Following the release of the critically and commercially successful video game Super Meat Boy co-created by programmer Tommy Refenes and artist Edmund McMillen of Team Meat, McMillen collaborated with programmer Florian Himsl on the Flash video game The Binding of Isaac as a three-month exploration of the roguelike genre. After the game's release in 2011, McMillen worked with Refenes to develop Mew-Genics, taking into consideration lessons learned from the development of The Binding of Isaac. Announced in October 2012, the game was described by McMillen as being randomly generated, involving cats and the "strangest project [he had] ever worked on". The cats engaged bosses in a manner styled, principally, after Pokémon combat system, where opponents become progressively more difficult with every fight. Outside combat, cats could participate in various activities, such as beauty pageants and sewer races – as well as be cryogenically frozen for longevity. The game was intended to be a multi-platform title, with iOS being the first announced platform, followed by Steam and Android. The game's soundtrack was composed by the two-member band Ridiculon, McMillen's repeat collaborators.

Shortly after production began, McMillen and Refenes realized that they had underestimated the scope of Mew-Genics, with the game experiencing feature creep. Therefore, Team Meat temporarily shelved Super Meat Boy Forever, their planned handheld successor to Super Meat Boy, to prioritize Mew-Genics. It was originally planned to be released in 2014, and available for beta-test at PAX Prime in Seattle, Washington, between August and September 2013, but Team Meat announced directly before the event that it would only be exhibited and not playable. The game was playable for the public at PAX East in Boston, Massachusetts, in April 2014, with Team Meat insisting it would still release that year. In August 2014, development of Mew-Genics was put on hold to work on refactoring the gameplay to make it more coherent. After two years of no development, McMillen confirmed in 2016 that Mew-Genics had been cancelled while he shifted focused to the Binding of Isaac spinoff The Legend of Bum-bo. McMillen subsequently departed from Team Meat, which he credited to a divergence in creative philosophy: whilst Refenes was interested in expanding the Super Meat Boy series, McMillen expressed interest in creating new intellectual properties.

=== Final design and release ===
An early prototype of the final design in January 2020, featuring tactical combat and an isometric perspective

In January 2018, McMillen announced in a blog post that he had secured the rights to Mewgenics (unhyphenated) from Team Meat and that the project would be developed with video game designer Tyler Glaiel, McMillen's collaborator from The End Is Nigh. Eurogamer reported that the game's design would undergo a complete overhaul, with an anticipated release date several years away. While McMillen had been working on The Legend of Bum-bo, the final expansion for The Binding of Isaac: Rebirth called Repentance and the physical card game Tapeworm, Glaiel prototyped several gameplay variants for the rebooted Mewgenics. The genres Glaiel tested included brawler and real-time strategy, though he found them to be too chaotic. In early 2020, a turn-based tactical role-playing prototype moved forward as the game's design. The game was built upon an engine developed by Glaiel in 2010, which was previously utilized for development of The End Is Nigh and capable of importing assets created in Adobe Flash.

In October 2022, the official Steam page for Mewgenics was launched promoting it as a turn-based roguelike legacy game. In April 2025, with most of the content for Mewgenics completed, developers released an official trailer blending live-action performances and in-game content. During September 2025 announcement, McMillen confirmed that all the major content for Mewgenics had been completed and showcased the first longform gameplay video. Mewgenics was released on Steam on February 10, 2026. In February 2026, McMillen confirmed that console versions were in development. Immediately following a live performance of music from the game by Ridiculon at Gamescom in Cologne, Germany, console versions for Nintendo Switch 2, PlayStation 5, and Xbox Series X, Series S were announced, with a release date of September 8, 2026. Nicalis announced physical versions of Mewgenics to be released for Nintendo Switch 2 and PlayStation 5 in the first quarter of 2027.

== Reception ==
Reception

Aggregate scores
Aggregator	Score
Metacritic	88/100
OpenCritic	96% recommend

Review scores
Publication	Score
GameSpot	9/10
GamesRadar+	4.5/5
IGN	9/10
PC Gamer (US)	92/100
PCGamesN	8/10
RPGFan	79/100
The Guardian	4/5

Mewgenics was first previewed by journalist Russ Frushtick of Polygon on Halloween 2022, detailing his playthrough, as well as McMillen and Glaiel's account of the game's development history. He complimented it for being "one of the most ambitious and bizarre strategy games [he had] ever played." IGN journalist Tom Marks was given an extended preview of Mewgenics in May 2025 and praised the game for being one of the most exciting and nuanced roguelikes he had played in years. Tyler Wilde of PC Gamer, attending the early preview in July 2025, agreed with McMillen's assessment of Mewgenics as the best title of his career. Jean-Luc Seipke from GameSpot praised the video preview of Mewgenics posted in December 2025, describing it as "[his] next obsession".

The game received highly positive reviews from critics. After reaching a Top Critic Average of 89 with 96% of critics recommending the title on OpenCritic, Mewgenics became the first game of 2026 to secure "Must-Play" status. In response to the critical reception, Polygon's Giovanni Colantonio declared that Mewgenics was the first legitimate Game of the Year contender for 2026. Ali Jones' review for GamesRadar+ felt that the game's randomness was sometimes unfair, although this increased the satisfaction of finding ways to tip the odds in the player's favor and overall considered it "an excellent addition to its creator's already enviable canon". Jason Rodriguez from GameSpot praised the game's "limitless variety" and "ridiculous humor". Dan Stapleton of IGN praised the game's soundtrack, length, and humor. In The Guardian, Alex Spencer praised the game's amount of content, saying he had only seen less than a third of it after playing the game for 60 hours. PC Gamer's Robin Valentine said that he was still discovering new content after 100 hours of play. Jerry Williams of RPGFan felt that while the game sometimes felt repetitive, the sheer amount of content meant they would keep coming back to it. Writing for PCGamesN, Paul Kelly criticised the humor but praised the gameplay, calling Mewgenics "a good, maybe even great, strategy game that is also criminally unfunny".

Soon after the game's release, McMillen received minor backlash in response to some voice cameos which some players considered controversial, including YouTubers Ethan Klein and Hila Klein. McMillen responded to the controversy in an interview with Rock Paper Shotgun, explaining that he wished to "include and keep [cameos] that clashed or kinda counterbalanced each other", and that he wanted to include people with "different beliefs", pointing to his inclusion of YouTubers iDubbbz and Anisa as an example; and, responding to the overall controversy, "I understand we live in a time where a meow from someone who has different beliefs as you is scary and frustrating, confusing and controversial."

=== Sales ===
Mewgenics sold over 150,000 copies within the first six hours of its release, enough to fully recoup its development costs. In the first week after release, the game sold over one million copies.

=== Awards ===
Year	Award	Category	Result	Ref.
2026	Golden Joystick Awards	Best Indie Game — Self-Published	Nominated	
2026	Golden Joystick Awards	Best Soundtrack	Nominated	
2026	Golden Joystick Awards	PC Game of the Year	Nominated	
2026	The Game Awards 2026	Best Independent Game	Pending	
2026	The Game Awards 2026	Best Sim/Strategy Game	Pending	
