= The Binding of Isaac (video game) =

2011 video game

- Designers: Edmund McMillen; Florian Himsl
- Artist: Edmund McMillen
- Composer: Danny Baranowsky
- Engine: Adobe Flash
- Platforms: Windows; OS X; Linux
- Release: September 28, 2011
- Genres: Roguelike, action-adventure
- Modes: Single-player; multiplayer

The Binding of Isaac is a 2011 roguelike action-adventure game designed by independent developers Edmund McMillen and Florian Himsl. It was initially released for Microsoft Windows, then ported to OS X and Linux. The game's title and plot are inspired by the Biblical story of the Binding of Isaac. In the game, Isaac's mother receives a message from God demanding the life of her son as proof of her faith, and Isaac, fearing for his life, flees into the monster-filled basement of their home where he must fight to survive. Players control Isaac or one of the 6 other unlockable characters through a procedurally generated dungeon in a roguelike manner, fashioned after those of The Legend of Zelda, defeating monsters in real-time combat while collecting items and power-ups to defeat bosses and eventually Isaac's mother.

The game was the result of a week-long game jam between McMillen and Himsl to develop a The Legend of Zelda-inspired roguelike that allowed McMillen to showcase his feelings about both positive and negative aspects of religion, which he had come to discover from conflicts between his Catholic and born again Christian family members while growing up. McMillen had considered the title a risk, but one he could take after the financial success of Super Meat Boy, and released it without much fanfare to Steam in September 2011, not expecting many sales. McMillen and Himsl released an expansion called "Wrath of the Lamb" in May 2012, but were limited from further expansion due to limitations with the Flash platform. They had started working with Nintendo in 2012 to release a 3DS version, but Nintendo later backed out of the deal, citing controversy over the game's religious themes.

Developer Nicalis worked with McMillen in 2014 to complete a remake of the game, The Binding of Isaac: Rebirth, adding features McMillen had planned that exceeded Flash's capabilities, as well as to improve the game's graphics and enable ports for other systems beyond personal computers, including PlayStation 4 and Vita, Xbox One, Wii U, Nintendo 3DS, and the Nintendo Switch. This remake has commonly been cited as one of the best roguelike games of all time. (Note: Attributed to multiple references:) McMillen later worked with James Id to develop The Legend of Bum-bo, which serves as a prequel to The Binding of Isaac.

The Binding of Isaac has been well-received, with critics praising the game's roguelike nature to encourage repeated playthroughs. In the months following its release, the game's popularity increased, partially as a result of various Let's Play videos showcasing the title. By July 2014, McMillen reported over 3 million copies had been sold. The game has been credited with renewing interest in the roguelike genre from both players and developers.

== Gameplay ==
Gameplay screenshot of The Binding of Isaac, showing Isaac attacking (center) and two enemies (top left and top right)

The Binding of Isaac is a top-down dungeon crawler game, presented using two-dimensional sprites, in which the player controls Isaac or other unlockable characters as they explore the dungeons located in Isaac's basement. The characters differ in speed, amount of health, amount of damage they deal, and other attributes. The game's mechanics and presentation is similar to the dungeons of The Legend of Zelda, while incorporating random, procedurally-generated levels in the manner of a roguelike game. On each floor of the basement dungeon, the player must fight monsters in a room before continuing onto the next room. This is most commonly done by the character's tears as bullets in the style of a twin-stick shooter, but the player can also use a limited supply of bombs to damage enemies and clear out parts of the room. Other methods of defeating enemies become possible as the character gains power-ups, items that are automatically worn by the player-character when picked up that can alter the character's core attributes, such as increasing health or the strength of each tear, or cause additional side effects, such as for allowing charged tear shots to be fired after holding down a controller button for a short while, or a means to fire tears behind the character. Power-ups include passive items that improve the character's attributes automatically, active power-ups that can be used once before they are recharged by completing additional rooms in the dungeon, and single-use power-ups such as pills or Tarot cards that confer a one-time benefit when used, such as regaining full health, or increasing or decreasing all attributes of the character. The effect of power-ups stack, so that the player may come into highly-beneficial power-up combinations.

Once a room is cleared of monsters, it will remain clear, allowing the player to re-trace their way through the level, though once they move onto the next level, they cannot return. Along the way, the player can collect money to buy power-ups from shopkeepers, keys to unlock special treasure rooms, and new weapons and power-ups to strengthen their chances against the enemies. The player's health is tracked by a number of hearts; if the character loses all his hearts, the game ends in permadeath and the player must start over from a freshly-generated dungeon. Each floor of the dungeon includes a boss which the player must defeat before continuing to the next level. On the sixth of eight floors, the player fights Isaac's mother; after defeating her, Isaac crawls into her womb. Later levels are significantly harder, culminating in a fight against the heart of Isaac's mother on the eighth floor. An optional ninth floor, Sheol, contains the boss Satan. Winning the game with certain characters or by certain conditions unlocks new power-ups that might appear in the dungeon or the ability to use one of the other characters. The game tracks the various power-ups that the player has found over time which can be reviewed from the game's menus.

== Plot ==
The Binding of Isaac's plot is very loosely inspired by the biblical story of the same name. Isaac, a child, and his mother live in a small house on a hill, happily keeping to themselves, with Isaac drawing pictures and playing with his toys, and his mother watching Christian broadcasts on television.

One day, Isaac's mother hears "a voice from above," which she believes is that of God Himself. The voice states that her son, Isaac, is "corrupted with sin and needs to be saved." It asks her to remove all evil from Isaac, and his mother agrees, taking away his toys, drawings, and even his clothes. The voice speaks to Isaac's mother for a second time, stating that Isaac must be cut off from all that is evil in the world. Once again, his mother agrees and locks Isaac inside his room. For the last time, the voice speaks to Isaac's mother. It states that she has done well, but it still questions her devotion and tells her to sacrifice her son. She agrees, grabs a butcher's knife from the kitchen, and walks to Isaac's room, preparing to sacrifice him. Isaac, watching through a sizable crack in his door, starts to panic. He finds a trapdoor hidden under his rug and jumps in, just as his mother bursts through his bedroom door. It is then assumed that the start of every new run is just after Isaac jumps down into the trapdoor.

Until The Binding of Isaac: Repentance expansion in the remake, there is no clear conclusion, or even consistent narrative, to the story past this point. The original game features 13 possible endings, one after each major boss fight. The first ten endings serve as introductions to unlocked items and mechanics, while the final three suggest meaningful evidence to understanding the conclusion (although this is not revealed until a new game and three DLCs later).

During the game's cutscenes through two levels, or floors, Isaac is shown curled up in a ball, crying. His thoughts are visible, ranging from rejection from his mother and humiliation from his peers to a scenario involving his death.

== Development and release ==
Edmund McMillen in 2012

The Binding of Isaac was developed following the release of Super Meat Boy, which McMillen considered a significant risk and a large time effort. When Super Meat Boy was released to both critical praise and strong sales, he felt that he no longer had to worry about the consequences of taking risks with his finances supported by its sales. He also considered he could take further risk with the concept. He had been planning to work with Tommy Refenes, the co-developer of Super Meat Boy, on their next game, Mewgenics, but as Refenes had taken some time off, McMillen looked to develop something he considered to be "low stress" with minimal expectations such as an Adobe Flash game.

The Binding of Isaac's main concept was the result of a weeklong game jam that McMillen had with Florian Himsl; at the time, his co-contributor on Super Meat Boy, Tommy Refenes, was on vacation. The concept McMillen had was two-fold: to develop a roguelike title based on the first The Legend of Zelda game's dungeon structure, and to develop a game that addressed McMillen's thoughts on religion. McMillen had been inspired by Shigeru Miyamoto, the designer of the original Zelda games. McMillen saw the potential of the procedural generation aspect of roguelikes including in Spelunky and Desktop Dungeons, and considered that working on procedural generation would help towards development of his planned game Mewgenics. McMillen compares Isaac's controls to the game Smash TV.

Random rooms were created for each floor of the dungeon by selecting ten to twenty rooms from a pre-built library of 200 layouts, adding in the monsters, items, and other features, and then including fixed rooms that would be found on each floor, such as a boss room and treasure room. In expanding the gameplay, McMillen used the structure of Zelda's dungeons to design how the player would progress through the game. In a typical Zelda dungeon, according to McMillen, the player acquires a new item that helps them to progress farther in the game; he took the same inspiration to assure that each level in Isaac included at least one item and one bonus item on defeating the boss that would boost the character's attributes. McMillen also wanted to encourage players to experiment to learn how things work within Isaac, mirroring how Miyamoto had done with the original Zelda game. He designed the level progression to become more difficult with the player's progression in the game, as well as additional content that became available after beating the game as to make it feel like the game was long. McMillen designed four of the selectable characters based on the main classes of Dungeons & Dragons—fighter, thief, cleric and wizard.

On the story side, McMillen explained that the religious tone is based on his own experiences with his family, split between Catholics and born-again Christians. McMillen noted that while both sides born out faith from the same Bible, their attitudes were different; he found some of the Catholic rituals his family performed inspiring, while other beliefs they had were condemning of several pastimes McMillen had participated in like Dungeons & Dragons. He took inspiration from that duality to create Isaac's narrative, showing how religion can both instill harmful feelings while also bringing about dark creativity. McMillen also considered the scare tactics used by the Christian right to condemn popular media of the 1980s, such as heavy metal and video games. McMillen noted how many of the propaganda films from this period featured satanic cults that would sacrifice children, and he noted how many Biblical stories mirrored these concepts, subsequently building the story around that. He also stated that he also tended to like "really weird stuff" relating to toilet humor and similar types of off-color humor that did not sit well with his family and which he had explored in previous games before Super Meat Boy. While Super Meat Boy helped to make his reputation (including being one of the featured developers in Indie Game: The Movie), he felt it was a "safe" game considering his preferred type of humor, and used Isaac to return to this form, considering that the game could easily be "career suicide" but would make a statement about what he really wanted to do.

The Binding of Isaac began as a game jam between McMillen and Florian Himsl. Within the week, they had a working game written in Adobe Flash's ActionScript 2. The two agreed to complete it out as a game they could release on Steam though with no expectations of sales. Completion of the game from the prototype to the finished state took about 3 months with part-time development. During this time, they discovered there were several limitations on the size and scope of both Flash and ActionScript that limited how much they could do with the game, but continued to use the tools as to release the title. McMillen said that because they were not worried about sales, they were able to work with Valve to release the game without fears of censorship or having to seek an ESRB rating. Releasing through Steam also enabled them to update the game freely, several times on its initial release, an aspect that they could not do with other consoles without significant cost to themselves. They did release without significant end-user testing, as it would have taken several hundreds of users to go through all the various combinations of items that a player could collect, and McMillen recognized they had released the title with their buyers being playtesters for them. A week after the Steam release, McMillen released a demo version via the website Newgrounds. Merge Games produced a physical edition that included the game, soundtrack, and a poster, for stores in the United Kingdom in 2012.

AS2 was a very outdated program at the time, and caused many low-end PCs and even high-end PCs to encounter slow down at times. AS2 also lacked controller support, and Tommy Refenes had to help write an achievement program that would allow people to unlock Steam achievements. McMillen later stated that he would not have made it in Flash at all if he had known anyone would actually care about Isaac.

=== Soundtrack ===
Danny Baranowsky, the game's composer and who previously worked with McMillen on Super Meat Boy, was involved early on with the project shortly after the completion of the first prototype. McMillen and Baranowsky worked back and forth, with McMillen providing artwork from the game and allowing Baranowsky to develop the musical themes based on that; this would often lead to McMillen creating more art to support the music as it progressed. Baranowsky had been drawn to The Binding of Isaac as though the game puts forth a dark tone, he stated it had rather silly undertones underneath and such that one could not take it too seriously. Some of the songs were inspired by classical choral music but modified to fit the theme of the game. Other works were inspired by boss fight songs composed by Nobuo Uematsu for the Final Fantasy series. Baranowsky also had additional time after finishing the main songs for the game to craft short additional tracks that were used for special rooms like shops and secret areas.

=== Cancelled Nintendo 3DS port ===
In January 2012, as the game has surpassed 450,000 units sold, McMillen stated that he was approached by a publisher that had interest in bringing the title to the Nintendo 3DS as a downloadable title through the Nintendo eShop, though McMillen had reservations given Nintendo's reputation for less risque content. In late February, McMillen stated that Nintendo had rejected the game because of "questionable religious content". He believed this stemmed from Germany's classification board rating the existing Windows version of the game as "age 16+" due to potentially blasphemous content, the first such time a game was rated in that manner in the country. McMillen noted that Nintendo executives he spoke to before this decision had noted some blasphemous content would have been acceptable, and were more concerned with overtly religious content. He also noted that he was approached about his willingness to make some changes to the game to make it more suitable for the 3DS, but never was given a list of specific changes. McMillen speculated that Nintendo was worried about its reputation; because of the game's resemblance to The Legend of Zelda, an unknowing child could potentially have downloaded the title and been shocked by the content, which would have reflected poorly on Nintendo.

Several game websites were outraged at Nintendo's decision. Though disappointed with Nintendo's decision, McMillen did not think the loss of the 3DS port was a major issue, and saw a brief sales burst on Steam as the news was covered on gaming websites. McMillen further praised the flexibility of the Steam platform, which does not require games to obtain ESRB ratings to be published on the service, and the freedom it gave to the publishers regardless of the game content.

Nintendo would later allow the Rebirth remake to be released on both the New Nintendo 3DS and the Wii U in 2015; this came in part because Nintendo's Steve Singer (vice president of licensing), Mark Griffin (a senior manager in licensing), and Dan Adelman (the head of indie development) championed support for The Binding of Isaac.

=== Wrath of the Lamb ===
An expansion to the game, entitled Wrath of the Lamb, was released through Steam on May 28, 2012. McMillen was inspired to create the expansion not only due to the success of the base game, but because his wife Danielle had fully completed the base game, the first game he had written in which she had shown significant interest. The expansion adds 70% more content to the original, and contains more than 10 bosses, over 100 items, over 40 unlocks, two additional endings, and two additional optional levels. This expansion added new "alternate" floors, which can replace the normal floors, creating an alternate route through the game. These floors contain harder enemies, and a different set of bosses. Other features include a new item type, Trinkets, which have a variety of passive or triggered effects when carried, as well as new room types. McMillen had plans to release a second expansion beyond Wrath of the Lamb, but was constrained by the limits of Flash at this point. In May 2015, Florian Himsl released a final 'Eternal Edition' update for the Flash version, which introduced an 'Eternal' difficulty mode and rebalanced several items, serving as the final content expansion for the 2011 title before the developer shifted focus entirely to the Rebirth engine.

=== The Binding of Isaac: Rebirth ===
Sometime in 2012 after Isaac's release, McMillen was approached by Tyrone Rodriguez of Nicalis who asked if McMillen was interested in bringing the game to consoles. McMillen was interested, but insisted that they would have to reprogram the game to get around the limitations of Flash and to include Wrath of the Lamb and the second planned expansion, remaking the game's graphics in 16-bit instead of vector-based Flash graphics. Further, McMillen had wanted nothing to do with the business aspects of the game, having recounted the difficulties he had in handling this for Super Meat Boy. Nicalis agreed to these, and began work in 2012 on what would become The Binding of Isaac: Rebirth, an improved version of the title. It was released on November 4, 2014, for Microsoft Windows, OS X, Linux, PlayStation 4, and PlayStation Vita, with versions for the Wii U, New Nintendo 3DS, and Xbox One released on July 23, 2015. The game introduced numerous new playable characters, items, enemies, bosses, challenges, and room layout seeds for floors. A content pack, entitled Afterbirth was released for Rebirth starting October 2015, adding new alternate chapters, characters and items, as well as wave-based Greed mode. A second update, Afterbirth+, added further additional content and support for user-created modifications, and was released on January 3, 2017. A third and final update, Repentance added a lot of new content and bug fixes, including most of the content from Antibirth, one of the biggest fan-made expansions, such as a new alternate path through the whole game as well as numerous character variations and new final bosses. This expansion was released on March 31, 2021.

=== Other games ===
On June 27, 2018, McMillen announced and later released a card game adaptation in cooperation with Studio 71 titled The Binding of Isaac: Four Souls. He collaborated with James Id to develop The Legend of Bum-bo, which was released on November 12, 2019, for Windows and later for iOS and Switch. Bum-bo is described as a prequel to Isaac, and Isaac and Gish appear as characters in the game. Isaac also appears as a playable character in the fighting game Blade Strangers, and the puzzle game Crystal Crisis.

== Reception ==
The Binding of Isaac

Aggregate score
Aggregator	Score
Metacritic	84/100

Review scores
Publication	Score
Destructoid	9.5/10<
Edge	8/10
Eurogamer	9/10
Game Informer	8/10
GameSpot	8/10
GameSpy	4.5/5
IGN	7.5/10

The Binding of Isaac received generally favorable reviews from game critics. On Metacritic, the game has an average of 84 out of 100 based on 30 reviews.

The Binding of Isaac has been received by reviewers as a game with high replayability with the extensive range and combinations of power-ups that the player can encounter during a run-through, while providing an accessible Zelda-inspired framework that most video game players would recognize and easily come to understand. John Teti for Eurogamer praised the game for its replayability through the randomization aspects, calling it "the most accessible exploration of the roguelike idea" that he had seen. Edge's similarly commented on the lure to replay the game due to its short playthrough time, calling it "an imaginative and quick-witted arcade experience that manages to be both depraved and strangely sweet by turn". GameSpot's Maxwell McGee stated that the game smartly has removed extraneous features such that "what remains is a tightly focused game that continues to feel fresh even after multiple completions". Though the game is considered to be accessible to new players, reviewers found the game to be a difficult challenge, often set by the randomness of what power-ups the player happened to acquire during a single run. Writers for The A.V. Club rated the game an A on a grading scale, and favorably compared the title to McMillen's Super Meat Boy, requiring the player to have "masochistic patience in the face of terrible odds". This difficulty was considered mitigated by the large number of possible power-ups that the game offers, most would not be seen by players until they have replayed the game many times. McGee noted that while players can review what items they have discovered prior to a run-through, this feature does not explain what each item does, leaving the effect to be determined by the player while in game.

Game Informer's Adam Biessener noted that while The Binding of Isaac had a number of software bugs on release that may briefly detract from the experience, "McMillen's vision shines through" in the game's playability, art style, and story. Neilie Johnson for IGN found that some players may be put off by the game's crudeness but otherwise "it's totally random, highly creative and brutally unforgiving". Similarly, Nathan Muenier for GameSpy noted the game had some shock value that one must work past, but otherwise was "imaginative" and "utterly absorbing". Alternatively, Jordan Devore for Destructoid considered the visual style of the game one of its "biggest selling points", following from McMillen's past style of dark comedy from Super Meat Boy. Baranowsky's soundtrack was found by reviewers to well-suit the themes of the game, and used appropriately to avoid extensive repetition during a playthrough. Kirk Hamilton of Kotaku called the soundtrack as the combination of several genres and the musical styles of Danny Elfman, Muse, and Final Fantasy that created something "dark and unique".

The Binding of Isaac was nominated in the Best Independent Game category at the 2011 Spike Video Game Awards, but lost to Minecraft.

McMillen had only expected the game to sell a few hundred copies when he released it on Steam. For the first few months of its release, sales were roughly a few hundred per day, but shortly thereafter, McMillen found sales suddenly were boosted, a fact he attributed to numerous Let's Play videos that had been published by players to showcase the game and drove sales. This popularity also drew interest by players that wanted to create custom mods for the game, which would become a factor in the design of the sequel to better support modding.

By November 2012, the game sold over one million copies, with at least one-quarter of those having purchased the "Wrath of the Lamb" extension. As of July 2014, the game has sold over 3 million copies. By July 2015, following the release of Rebirth, the combined games had over 5 million units sold. The Binding of Isaac is said to be a contributing factor towards the growth of the roguelike genre since around 2010, with its success paving the way for later games that used the roguelike formula, such as FTL: Faster Than Light and Don't Starve.
