= Tboi =

Tboi or TBOI may refer to:

- The Binding of Isaac, a 2011 video game
  - The Binding of Isaac: Rebirth, 2014 remake of the above.
