= Tyler Glaiel =

American video game developer (born 1990)

- Glaiel in 2012
- Born: June 8, 1990 (age 36)
- Other name: Glaiel Games
- Occupations: Game designer and programmer
- Website: glaielgames.com

Tyler Glaiel (born 1990), also known by the moniker Glaiel Games, is an American video game designer and programmer known for games such as Aether (2008), Closure (2012), Number (2013), Bombernauts (2017), The End Is Nigh (2017) and Mewgenics (2026).

== Life and career ==
Glaiel is a native of Westfield, Massachusetts. He developed his first game, a simple thing called Pigeon Pooper using Adobe Flash in 2002, before his twelfth birthday. By high school, Glaiel was already one of the most successful game developers on Newgrounds, reportedly earning thousands of dollars from his games alone, leading Jonathan Holmes of Destructoid to call him "the Doogie Howser of videogames". He became a frequent collaborator of Edmund McMillen and went on to develop several titles together. In 2008, he earned the rank of Eagle Scout, the highest achievement in Scouts BSA. His game, Closure, won the Gameplay Innovation award at Indiecade 2009 and the Independent Games Festival award for Excellence in Audio in 2010, in addition to being nominated in the Innovation and Technical Excellence categories. The following year, he was invited to participate in the IGF's jury for the festival's innovation award, Nuovo.

Glaiel was included in the Forbes 30 Under 30 games industry section in 2016. Utilizing and building up a proprietary game engine of his own creation that allowed for SVG assets created in Adobe Flash to be imported expediently, Glaiel collaborated with McMillen for several months on The End Is Nigh, before it was released in 2017. In 2018, McMillen announced that he had acquired the rights to his previous project, Mewgenics and that he and Glaiel had begun developing it.

As of 2020, he was living in California. In 2020, at the onset of the COVID-19 pandemic when face masks were becoming mandated by law in many parts of the world, Glaiel received a great deal of attention for a voice-activated LED face mask he made on a lark. The positive press led Glaiel to take the mask to Kickstarter, where he raised over US$70,000 to mass-produce it under the name JabberMask.

== Games ==
Year	Title	Platform	Co-developer(s)	Designer	Programmer	Notes
2005	Magnetism	Flash		Yes	Yes	
2005	Magnetism 2	Flash		Yes	Yes	
2005	Krazy Kar	Flash		Yes	Yes	Audio
2005	supersoldier	Flash	Dan Paladin	Yes	Yes	
2006	NightStrike	Flash		Yes	Yes	
2006	Aqua Slug	Flash		Yes	Yes	
2006	Paths	Flash		Yes	Yes	
2007	Paths 2	Flash		Yes	Yes	
2008	Aether	Flash	Edmund McMillen	Yes	Yes	
2009	Closure	Flash		Yes	Yes	Story, Music
2009	Tetraform	Flash		Yes	Yes	
2012	Closure	PS3, Windows, Mac, Linux		Yes	Yes	Port of the Flash game
2012	Offspring Fling	Windows, Mac OS, Linux				Tech Support
2012	Fracuum	Flash		Yes	Yes	
2012	The Basement Collection	Windows, OS X, Linux	Edmund McMillen	Yes	Yes	
2012	Number	Flash		Yes	Yes	
2015	Crypt of the NecroDancer	Windows, Mac, Linux, PS4, PS Vita, iOS, tvOS, Xbox One, Switch				Tester
2015	Bombernauts	Windows		Yes	Yes	
2017	The End Is Nigh	Windows, OS X, Linux, PS4, Switch	Edmund McMillen	Yes	Yes	
2018	Octogeddon	Windows, Switch				Tester
2018	Iconoclasts	Windows, Mac, Linux, PS4, PS Vita, Switch, Xbox One				Tester
2019	The Legend of Bum-bo	Windows, OS X, Android, iOS, Switch			Yes	Additional Programming
2021	The Binding of Isaac: Repentance	Windows, Switch, PS4, PS5, Xbox One, Xbox Series X/S				Tester
2026	Mewgenics	Windows, Switch 2, PS5, Xbox Series X/S	Edmund McMillen	Yes	Yes	
