= The Basement Collection =

- Designers: Edmund McMillen; Tyler Glaiel; William Good; Eli Piilonen; Tommy Refenes; Florian Himsl
- Artist: Edmund McMillen
- Composer: Danny Baranowsky
- Platforms: Windows, OS X, Linux
- Release: August 31, 2012
- Genre: Various
- Mode: Single-player

The Basement Collection is a compilation of Edmund McMillen's Flash games released on August 31, 2012. The games were remade with added features and music tracks. The collection also adds many behind-the-scenes content such as Q&A, concept art, and clips of deleted content.

== Content ==
The games in the collection include:

- Tri-Achnid (2006), a physics spider simulation game
- Coil (2008), an experimental art game
- Meat Boy (2008), a Super Meat Boy predecessor
- Aether (2008), a space adventure game
- Grey-Matter (2008), an anti-shooter game
- Spewer (2009), a liquid physics platform game
- Time Fcuk (2009), a dark puzzle game

Unlockable content includes:

- The Lonely Hermit (2001), a child's story (unlocked by completing Tri-Achnid)
- AVGM (2009), an experimental "Abusive Video Game Manipulation" joke endless clicker mini-game (unlocked by completing Coil)
- Meat Boy (map pack) (2008), the Meat Boy game with different maps (unlocked by completing Meat Boy)
- The Box, scans of Edmund McMillen's art at 3–5 years-old that were found in a box kept by his grandmother (unlocked by completing Aether)
- Thicker Than Water, a 65-page virtual comic about Edmund McMillen's childhood (unlocked by completing Spewer)
- The Chest, eight years of drawings from Edmund McMillen's sketchbooks (unlocked by completing Time Fcuk)

Additionally, under steamapps/common/basement/moregames, four other games can be found:

- Carious Weltling (2003)
- Clubbe the Seal (2004), a side-scrolling action game
- Carious Weltling 2 (2005)
- Viviparous Dumpling (2005)

Most of the content was previously published at Newgrounds:

- The Lonely Hermit (2001)
- Tri-Achnid (2006)
- Coil (2008)
- Aether (2008)
- Meat Boy (2008)
- Grey-Matter (2008)
- Meat boy (map pack) (2008)
- AVGM (2009)
- Spewer (2009)
- Time Fcuk (2009)

== Notes ==
- McMillen, Edmund (August 2012). "A new game has appeared in the basement!". Edmundm.com. Edmund McMillen. Archived from the original on 2012-07-10.
- Rambo, Dant (2012-08-27). "Edmund McMillen Interview, Part 1: The Basement Collection". Gamezebo. Gamezebo, Inc. Archived from the original on 2012-09-05.
- Johnson, Ryan (2012-09-02). "Interview with Edmund McMillen for the Basement Collection (Reviewed)". GoozerNation. Michael Rohde. Archived from the original on 2012-09-09.
- Mason_M (2012-09-08). "The Basement Collection Review". WikiGameGuides.com. Next Gen Walkthroughs LLC. Archived from the original on 2012-09-15.
