= Super Meat Boy Forever =

2020 video game

- Developer: Team Meat
- Publisher: Team Meat (Note: Published by Thunderful Publishing for Android and iOS)
- Designers: Tommy Refenes; Kyle Pulver; Ryan Anderson; Daniel Linssen
- Programmer: Tommy Refenes
- Artists: Lala Fuchs; Paul ter Voorde
- Composer: Ridiculon
- Engine: Tommunism Engine
- Platforms: Nintendo Switch; Windows; Linux; PlayStation 4; PlayStation 5; Xbox One; Xbox Series X/S; Android; iOS
- Release: Switch, Windows, Linux; December 23, 2020; PS4, PS5, Xbox One, Xbox Series X/S; April 16, 2021; Android, iOS; April 20, 2023
- Genre: Platform
- Mode: Single-player

Super Meat Boy Forever is a 2020 platform video game developed and published by Team Meat. It was released for Nintendo Switch, Windows and Linux in 2020, PlayStation 4, PlayStation 5, Xbox One and Xbox Series X/S in 2021 and Android and iOS in 2023. Originally planned as a mobile-only version of Super Meat Boy, Super Meat Boy Forever was gradually developed into a full-fledged sequel featuring its new auto-runner control scheme and randomly generated levels.

The game received mixed reviews from critics. It was followed by a spinoff, Dr. Fetus' Mean Meat Machine and a sequel, Super Meat Boy 3D.

== Gameplay ==
Super Meat Boy Forever expands on Super Meat Boy's challenging gameplay, as well as the main villain Dr. Fetus. Meat Boy and Bandage Girl's child Nugget has been kidnapped by Dr. Fetus and the couple must work together to rescue her. Both characters can kick and punch enemies and must avoid deadly obstacles to save Nugget. The control scheme uses two buttons. Levels are randomly generated based on the player's skill level by combining seamless premade level segments created by the designers.

The biggest gameplay change introduced in Super Meat Boy Forever is that it is an auto-runner, with the player only having control of non-scrolling movement interactions like wall-jumping and regular jumping.

== Plot ==
Taking place a few years after the original game, Meat Boy and Bandage Girl are enjoying life while having a picnic with their infant daughter Nugget. Suddenly, Dr. Fetus attacks them both and kidnaps Nugget. When Meat Boy and Bandage Girl come to and discover that Nugget is missing, they both go on a quest to save her.

The duo travels through multiple worlds to catch Fetus only for him to get away or ambush them, leaving them to fight multiple bosses like a telekinetic brain monster named Manic, a massive machine dubbed "Big Slugger", and his lair's security system. During their pursuit, a group of animals, led by a squirrel from the forest they had their picnic in, go after Dr. Fetus, take Big Slugger with them and convince Manic to help them take Fetus down, with Manic helping via powering Big Slugger.

After an intense fight in Dr. Fetus's lair, the duo gets trapped in a pile of Dead Meat Boys with Fetus laughing in success until the animals show up and try to take him on; only for Fetus to activate the Self-Destruct, destroying Slugger and leaving many of the animals on the brink of death. After seeing this, Nugget bursts into tears with Fetus trying to calm her down while Meat Boy and Bandage Girl get out of the pile and go for them. During this, the squirrel leader manages to reach a button that it assumes is the lair's self-destruct. Before the squirrel can press the button, it succumbs to its injuries and lands on top of the button, which destroys all of time, the world, causes Meat Boy and Bandage Girl to age, and turns Nugget and Fetus to atoms.

In the final world (dubbed "The Other Side"), Meat Boy and Bandage Girl (now Meat Ninja and Bandage Ripper) explore and try to find Nugget and Fetus. After find a hologram version of the two, they try and punch it only for it to turn into atoms and reveals God Fetus to the duo, who was made of atoms from Dr. Fetus and a planetary system, and fight Fetus in an ultimate battle. After the fight, the atoms of Nugget reform and bring her to the duo and celebrate their victory, with it getting cut short due to Fetus getting new atoms and throwing a heavy rock at them in order to kill them. With the duo holding the rock up, Nugget gets an idea and shows her pacifier to God Fetus in order for it calm down. Nugget's idea works and the atoms of Fetus remerge and present him to the 3 of them, with Nugget giving the pacifier as a gift. Dr. Fetus, happy due to the gift, then gets punched in the face and is sent flying through time to before the events in the lab and is knocked out from the punch. As a result, the duo de-age, the animals are saved and return to the forest, and Nugget is rescued at last.

During the credits, a montage shows Meat Boy, Bandage Girl, and Nugget spending time together on their way back to where they started, and the animal squad and Manic rebuilding the forest. In an after-credits scene, it shows the three of them having their picnic, packing up, and walking towards the sun. Meanwhile, Dr. Fetus (who still keeps Nugget's pacifier she gave to him) makes many Meat Boy clones via various recordings and arms himself with a plasma shotgun, hinting that he is not done yet.

== Development and release ==
Development of a mobile successor to Super Meat Boy was announced in February 2012, with the game being rebuilt from scratch, without assets from the original. The game was put on hold a year later, so Team Meat could focus on Mew-Genics. Super Meat Boy Forever was formally announced in August 2014 as a mobile-only spinoff to the original Super Meat Boy. Team Meat founders Edmund McMillen and Tommy Refenes originally teased the project as a "live-action stealth game" called A Voyeur for September, but this was later revealed to be an anagram for Super Meat Boy Forever. After a few years of little to no public updates, Edmund McMillen left Team Meat and began focusing on other projects such as The Binding of Isaac, The End Is Nigh and (the unhyphenated) Mewgenics. Refenes said to not "hold your breath" expecting McMillen to come back after Super Meat Boy Forever is released.

In 2017, Refenes restarted the project as a full-fledged sequel. In the following year several new team members joined Team Meat to help with development. Among the new team members were Kyle Pulver (Lead level designer) (Offspring Fling, Snapshot), Lala Fuchs (Lead Artist) and Paul ter Voorde (Animation director). Ridiculon, consisting of musicians Matthias Bossi and Jon Evans, who composed the music for the PlayStation 4 version of Super Meat Boy, returned to compose the sequel's soundtrack. Refenes explains that even though the game is still coming to mobile, the game was developed primarily as a console game. The new version of the game was revealed at PAX Prime 2017 and was showcased by Nintendo during their Nindies Summer 2017 Showcase, and the PAX demo of the game was well received by the media. The game was scheduled for an April 2019 release, but was pushed back to December 2020.

The game was released on December 23, 2020 as a timed exclusive for the Nintendo Switch, Microsoft Windows and Linux via Epic Games Store. Versions for PlayStation 4, PlayStation 5, Xbox One and Xbox Series X/S were released on April 16, 2021, and on April 20, 2023 for Android and iOS. A level editor called Meat Grinder was released on January 16, 2024.

== Reception ==
Reception

Aggregate scores
Aggregator	Score
Metacritic	(iOS) 68/100 (PC) 70/100 (NS) 66/100
OpenCritic	37% recommend

Review scores
Publication	Score
Computer Games Magazine	8/10
Destructoid	6/10
Game Informer	8/10
GameRevolution	7/10
GameSpot	8/10
Nintendo Life	7/10
Nintendo World Report	6/10
PC Gamer (US)	70/100
Shacknews	8/10
The Guardian	2/5
TouchArcade	4.5/5

On the review aggregation website Metacritic, the iOS, PC, and Nintendo Switch versions hold respective scores of 68, 70, and 66 out of 100 based on 4, 19, and 35 reviews respectively, which indicate "mixed or average" reviews. Fellow review aggregator OpenCritic assessed that the game received fair approval, being recommended by 37% of critics.
