= The End Is Nigh (video game) =

2017 video game

- Developers: Edmund McMillen; Tyler Glaiel
- Publishers: Edmund McMillen; Tyler Glaiel; Nicalis
- Composer: Ridiculon
- Engine: Glaiel Game Engine
- Platforms: Windows, macOS, Linux, Switch, PlayStation 4
- Release: Windows: WW: July 12, 2017; macOS: WW: August 15, 2017; Linux, Switch: WW: December 12, 2017; PlayStation 4: WW: April 30, 2019
- Genres: Platform, action-adventure
- Mode: Single-player

The End Is Nigh is a platform action-adventure video game developed by Edmund McMillen and Tyler Glaiel. It was released on July 12, 2017 on Microsoft Windows via Steam. Ports of the game were released on August 15, 2017, on macOS, December 12, 2017, for Linux and Nintendo Switch and on April 30, 2019, for PlayStation 4. The game has been described as a spiritual successor to McMillen's Super Meat Boy.

== Gameplay ==
Gameplay screenshot

The player controls Ash, a small blob. The game is divided into more than 600 single-screen, interconnected levels, forming over 15 chapters. The objective of the game is to clear the platforming challenges of each screen and proceed to the next, exploring the world and collecting items along the way. Collectable items include tumors, which unlock bonus levels and are used as lives in later chapters, and video game cartridges, which unlock retro levels.

The retro levels in cartridges are generally themed on the regions where they are found, with matching hazards and mechanics. Each cartridge has achievements, which award tumors to the player on completion. Some introduce additional mechanics, such as a time limit or rings that can be collected for achievements.

== Plot ==
The game's introduction shows Ash livestreaming a retro-styled version of the game with the same name, allowing the player to play through it. (Note: The game expects the player to fail in Ash's cartridge game by getting killed. Should the player be skilled enough to actually complete it successfully, the story prematurely ends with Ash concluding that the game is too easy, before turning off the livestream and resetting the game itself; thus the player must fail the cartridge game in order to begin the story proper.) On the player's death, the game-within-a-game crashes and is corrupted to the point of inoperability, which Ash is unable to remedy by blowing on its cartridge's edge connectors. The next day, Ash writes a letter explaining his current situation and the state of the world, stating that there was an apocalypse, with himself being the only survivor. With his favorite game cartridge broken, Ash sets out into the world to make a friend and re-populate the world.

Ash finds three body parts in various regions and assembles them into a friend, who he spends a drunken night with. He wakes up to discover that his friend is gone and the world has ended a second time, causing additional hazards to appear. Navigating through "The Future", Ash finds his friend stuck to a large glowing orb, and rejects his friend for leaving and betraying him.

In the Acceptance ending, the orb starts to explode and Ash must escape. When the explosion goes off, Ash accepts his fate and dies happily. In the Nevermore ending, Ash jumps into the orb and traverses a new region, finding a glitched version of his game cartridge. He then becomes a part of the world, joining a being called "Mother" to live forever.

== Development and release ==
McMillen in 2012

Glaiel in 2012

The End Is Nigh began development as the product of a game jam between Edmund McMillen and Tyler Glaiel in December 2016. The game was built upon an engine created by Glaiel in 2010 that allowed for assets created in Adobe Flash to be imported expediently. After a year of developing a platforming shooter game called Øuroboros, McMillen and Glaiel decided to refocus the concept, as little progress had been made on the game. While developing Øuroboros, they took small breaks to prototype other ideas and, in December 2016, both committed to do a full game jam to explore these concepts. Within the first week, they had developed a platformer with open-world and adventure game elements. McMillen described it as feeling "a bit like VVVVVV meets 1001 Spikes with a Spelunky control setup and it felt perfect". They continued to work on the game in secret for the next few months, and it was officially revealed and announced on June 7, 2017, about a month before its planned release date. McMillen announced the game shortly before its release, wanting to avoid the game becoming vaporware, as had been the case for some of his previously announced titles like Mewgenics (until it was later finished and released in 2026) and Super Meat Boy Forever (until it was taken over by another team and released in 2020). Of the completed game, McMillen said that The End Is Nigh is the largest game, level-wise, that he had worked on, and embodies aspects of every game that he had created. The game has voice acting by Rich Evans of RedLetterMedia and its music was composed by Ridiculon.

McMillen later said that he felt that The End Is Nigh was a cathartic experience for him. Before its development, he had been working on The Binding of Isaac: Rebirth and its expansions for several years, and had found the development to be an onus on his time, as well as having poor experiences with other developers. He had been considering leaving the game development market, which influenced some of the direction that The End Is Nigh took. He used the theme of perseverance as a core element of the game, helping him to resolve his own personal concerns, and as a result, McMillen felt that The End is Nigh was his best work.

== Reception ==
Reception

Aggregate score
Aggregator	Score
Metacritic	PC: 84/100; NS: 80/100

Review scores
Publication	Score
Computer Games Magazine	8/10
Destructoid	8.5/10
Edge	7/10
Eurogamer	Recommended
Game Informer	8.25/10
Nintendo Life	8/10
Nintendo World Report	8.5/10

The game received "generally favorable" reviews according to the review aggregator Metacritic. Patrick Klepek of Vice praised the game's challenging nature and its emphasis on exploration. Nic Rowen of Destructoid praised the puzzle-platformer aspects and the hidden secrets, but found the game slightly redundant with McMillen's previous Meat Boy.
