= JabberMask =

Wearable computer face mask

JabberMask was a planned wearable computer face mask that uses LED lights to allow its wearer to smile in a manner, despite wearing a mask. The mask was developed by game developer Tyler Glaiel. An early, unnamed prototype gained considerable attention online after Glaiel shared it on his personal Twitter account, and WHO listed it as a "COVID-19 innovation" on their website. Although Glaiel initially stated that he had no plans to sell the mask and encouraged others to build their own, positive press led him to launch a Kickstarter campaign, where he successfully raised over $70,000 to fund mass production. The mask is powered by an Arduino computer.

In November 2021, Glaiel announced that the project had been cancelled due to supply issues at the factory they were working with, and said refunds would be sent to Kickstarter backers.
