= Closure (video game) =

2012 video game

- Programmer: Tyler Glaiel
- Artist: Jon Schubbe
- Platforms: Macintosh, Windows, PlayStation Network, Linux
- Release: PlayStation 3: NA: March 27, 2012; Windows & Mac; September 7, 2012 Linux; December 19, 2012
- Genre: Puzzle-platform
- Mode: Single-player

Closure is a puzzle-platform game developed by American programmer Tyler Glaiel and artist Jon Schubbe with music and sound by Chris Rhyne. Originally available as a Flash game on the website Newgrounds, a full version of the game was later released for Microsoft Windows, Macintosh, and PlayStation Network in Spring 2012. A Linux port was included in the Humble Indie Bundle 7 in 2012.

== Gameplay ==
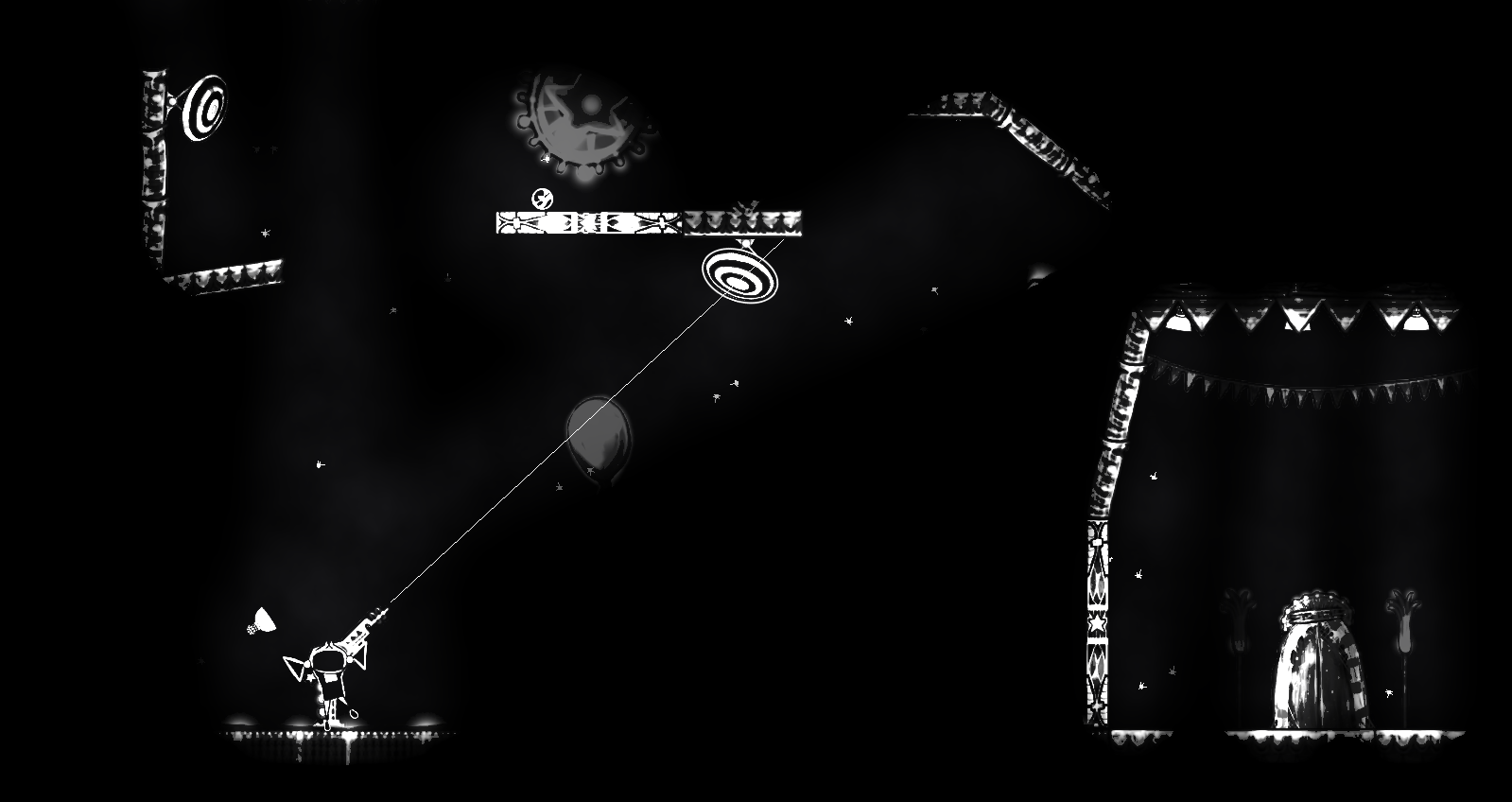
The carnival's world

Closure is a puzzle-platform game that centers on the concept of light. Through each of the many levels, the goal is to reach the door at the end. Lighting is a key gameplay mechanic, as only platforms and walls illuminated by lightbulbs, or orbs of light the player can carry can actually be touched by the player. The player can therefore walk through walls or fall through the floor based on where the light is. However, this also means the player can fall to their death accidentally by neglecting to stay inside of lit areas. There are also other objects which the player can interact with, such as hinged spotlights, keys, orb pedestals with various purposes and vines tied to orbs of light. The player has to make use of the light source and light orbs in order to get through the area without falling off the bottom.

== Reception ==
Reception

Aggregate score
| Aggregator | Score |
|---|---|
| Metacritic | 78/100 (PC); 81/100 (PS3) |

Review scores
| Publication | Score |
|---|---|
| Destructoid | 7.5/10 |
| Eurogamer | 8/10 |
| GameSpot | 8/10 |
| GameSpy | 4/5 |
| GamesRadar+ | 4/5 |
| GameTrailers | 8.1/10 |
| IGN | 8.5/10 |
| Joystiq | 4/5 |

Closure received scores of 78/100 for the Windows version (based on 8 reviews) and 81/100 for the PlayStation 3 version (based on 11 reviews) on Metacritic, both indicating "generally favorable" reviews.

The game won the Innovation Award at Indiecade, the award for Excellence in Audio at the 2010 Independent Games Festival and was the Grand Prize Winner at the 2012 Indie Game Challenge.
