= Coil (video game) =

Autobiographical video game

- Developers: Edmund McMillen; Florian Himsl
- Platform: Browser
- Release: 2008
- Genres: Puzzle, art game
- Mode: Single-player

Coil is an autobiographical Flash game developed by Edmund McMillen and Florian Himsl, released in 2008. It was nominated for the Innovation Award at the 2009 Independent Games Festival and is considered an example of an artgame. The game was sponsored by Armor Games.
