= Edmund McMillen =

American video game designer and artist (born 1980)

- McMillen in 2012
- Born: March 2, 1980 (age 46); Santa Cruz, California, U.S.
- Occupations: Video game designer, artist
- Known for: Super Meat Boy, The Binding of Isaac (Rebirth), The End Is Nigh, The Legend of Bum-bo, Mewgenics
- Spouse: Danielle McMillen (m. 2005)
- Children: 2

Edmund Charles John McMillen (born March 2, 1980) is an American video game designer and artist. He is known for his Adobe Flash games with unconventional visual styles. His works include the 2010 platformer Super Meat Boy, the 2011 roguelike game The Binding of Isaac, its 2014 remake The Binding of Isaac: Rebirth, and the 2026 turn-based roguelite game Mewgenics.

== Early life ==
McMillen was born on March 2, 1980, to a family of "born-again Christians" of Mexican descent. A lifelong resident of Watsonville, in Santa Cruz County, California, he attended Soquel High School. He is fond of drawing, his favorite subject being monsters. McMillen spent most of his childhood with his grandmother, whom he considers to be the greatest source of support in his creative endeavors. Later in his life, McMillen received a box from his grandmother that contained all of his drawings as a child. Many of these drawings can be seen by unlocking The Box in one of his games—"Aether"—which is part of The Basement Collection. His childhood is represented in many of his own game creations, especially The Binding of Isaac: Rebirth. In an interview with Indie Game: The Movie he explains that his family was consistently plagued with drug and alcohol addictions.

== Career ==
McMillen's initial graphic work was in independent comics. While he has largely abandoned this field in favor of video games, he has released a series of comics featuring Meat Boy, the title character in the video game Super Meat Boy, as a promotional tie-in for the game. His most well-known games are the Flash-based game Meat Boy, and its sequel Super Meat Boy, which has been released for PC, Xbox 360 and PlayStation 4. McMillen is also known for the games Gish, Aether, The Binding of Isaac and Coil. Gish won Game Tunnel's 2004 Adventure Game of the Year, as well as Indie Game of the Year. His game Coil was nominated for the Innovation Award at the 2009 Independent Games Festival. McMillen was the original character artist and animator on Braid, before those assets were replaced by the work of David Hellman. Braid went on to win the Innovation Award at the 2006 Independent Games Festival prior to its release, and several awards in 2008, including GameSpot's Best Platformer, and Best Original Downloadable Console Game, and the 12th Annual Academy of Interactive Arts & Sciences Awards Casual Game of the Year. His game Aether was a 2009 IndieCade finalist and received an honorable mention.

=== Super Meat Boy ===
McMillen in 2010

McMillen and programmer Tommy Refenes established Team Meat, an independent game production company, with the intent that they would never utilize a third-party publisher. Their first game, Super Meat Boy, was released on October 20, 2010, on the Xbox 360 via Xbox Live Arcade, and on Valve's digital distribution system Steam on November 30, 2010. A release was planned for the Nintendo Wii, but was canceled. According to Kotaku, problems arose due to the file size limitations of the Wii's WiiWare Channel. A retail version of the game was released on April 5, 2011. Due to Sony's initial lack of interest in the game, Team Meat entered into contractual obligations that prohibit the game from being released for the Sony PlayStation 3. McMillen and Refenes responded to the success of Super Meat Boy and the impossibility of a sequel in a brief statement that read, "We feel like we did it right the 1st time." McMillen and Refenes' development of Super Meat Boy was featured in the film Indie Game: The Movie.

In a 2017 interview with Eurogamer, Refenes revealed that McMillen was no longer a part of Team Meat and would not play a role in developing the game's sequel, Super Meat Boy Forever. McMillen later confirmed this in a blog post. Forever was eventually released in late 2020 for various platforms.

=== The Binding of Isaac ===
The Binding of Isaac is an indie roguelike video game designed by Edmund McMillen and Florian Himsl, initially released in 2011 for Microsoft Windows; the game was later ported for OS X, and Linux operating systems. The game's title and plot are inspired by the Biblical story of the Binding of Isaac. In the game, Isaac's mother receives a message from God demanding the life of her son as proof of her faith, and Isaac flees into the monster-filled basement of their home where he must fight to survive. Players control Isaac or one of 33 other unlockable characters through a procedurally generated dungeon in a roguelike manner, fashioned after those of The Legend of Zelda, defeating monsters in real-time combat while collecting items and power-ups to defeat bosses and eventually Isaac's mother.

The game was the result of a week-long game jam between McMillen and Himsl to develop a The Legend of Zelda-inspired roguelike that allowed McMillen to showcase his feelings about both positive and negative aspects of religion that he had come to discover from conflicts between his Catholic and born again Christian family members while growing up. McMillen had considered the title a risk, but one he could take after the financial success of Super Meat Boy, and released it without much fanfare to Steam in September 2011, not expecting many sales. The game soon gained popularity partially as a result of various Let's Play videos showcasing the title. McMillen and Himsl released an expansion "Wrath of the Lamb" in May 2012, but were limited from further expansion due to limitations with the Flash platform. They had started working with Nintendo in 2012 to release a 3DS version, but Nintendo later backed out of the deal, citing controversy over the game's religious themes.

Developer Nicalis worked with McMillen in 2014 to complete a remake of the game, The Binding of Isaac: Rebirth, bringing additional features that McMillen had planned that exceeded Flash's limitation, as well as to improve the game's graphics and enable ports for other systems beyond personal computers (including PlayStation 4 and Vita, Xbox One, Wii U, Nintendo 3DS, and Nintendo Switch). The Binding of Isaac: Rebirth has received three expansions, each one including more bosses, items, and areas. The first expansion, The Binding of Isaac: Afterbirth, released on October 30, 2015, the second expansion, The Binding of Isaac: Afterbirth+, released on January 3, 2017, and the third and final expansion, The Binding of Isaac: Repentance, was released on March 31, 2021.

In 2016, McMillen announced a prequel to The Binding of Isaac titled The Legend of Bum-bo, independently developed by programmer James Interactive and himself. The game was produced over the course of four years, without a working prototype created during the process. The Legend of Bum-bo was digitally released on Steam on November 12, 2019, to mixed reviews. The game was ported to iOS on December 7, 2020, then to Epic Games Store, GOG.com, Nintendo Switch, PlayStation 5 and Xbox Series X & Series S by Nicalis in 2022.

=== The End is Nigh ===
The End Is Nigh is a platform adventure video game developed by Edmund McMillen and Tyler Glaiel. The game was released on July 12, 2017, on Microsoft Windows via Steam. Ports of the game were released on August 15, 2017, on macOS and on December 12, 2017, for Linux and Nintendo Switch, with a port for the PlayStation 4 and PlayStation Vita in development. The game has been described as a spiritual successor to McMillen's Super Meat Boy.

The themes within the game were inspired by personal and professional experiences that had happened around the time of the game's development such as threatened lawsuits, his wife's pregnancy, and agoraphobia, which were described by McMillen as the "darkest" point in his career. McMillen was contemplating whether he wanted to continue making games, and these thoughts inspired the content of the game.

McMillen claimed that, to contrast Super Meat Boy's themes of challenging yourself because "it's worth it", The End is Nigh was designed to make players constantly question whether or not the game's challenges will reward them in the end. McMillen went on to describe The End is Nigh as "constantly waiting for the other shoe to drop, but it never drops", and described the struggles of the protagonist (Ash) as a "life falling apart".

== Works ==
Name	Platform(s)	Co-developer(s)	Publisher(s)	Release year	Notes
The Backup Files	Adobe Flash			2001	
The Lonely Hermit	Adobe Flash			2001	Included in The Basement Collection
Dead Baby Dressup!	Adobe Flash			2001	
12 uses of dead babies	Adobe Flash			2001	
Dead Baby Dressup 2!	Adobe Flash			2001	
6 more dead baby uses	Adobe Flash			2001	
Dead Baby Dressup 3	Adobe Flash			2001	
Stile man Dressup	Adobe Flash			2001	
WWF baby dressup	Adobe Flash			2001	
8 More Dead Baby Uses!	Adobe Flash			2001	
Dead Baby Dress up 4	Adobe Flash			2001	
The Boy who QuestionedGod	Adobe Flash			2001	
Dead Baby Dressup X	Adobe Flash			2001	
Dead Baby Super Hero Dres	Adobe Flash			2002	
Dead Baby Dressup best of	Adobe Flash			2002	
Carious Weltling	Adobe Flash	Caulder Bradford		2003	
SnackOlantern	Adobe Flash			2003	Described by McMillen as his worst game
Triptych	Windows	Chronic Logic		2003	
Word Peace	Windows	Chronic Logic		2003	
Clubby The Seal	Adobe Flash			2004	
Gish	Windows, OS X, Linux	Cryptic Sea	Chronic Logic	2004	First major game project
Carious Weltling 2	Adobe Flash			2005	
Weltling Dressup	Adobe Flash			2005	
Viviparous Dumpling	Adobe Flash			2005	
Cerebral Discharge iii	Adobe Flash			2005	
Blast Miner	Windows	Cryptic Sea	Chronic Logic	2006	
Triachnid	Adobe Flash	Florian Himsl		2006	Included in The Basement Collection
Holiday Snow Wars	Adobe Flash			2006	
Cereus Peashy	Adobe Flash			2007	
Weltling 2: Regurgitated	Adobe Flash			2007	
Host	Adobe Flash			2007	Online multiplayer game
Guppy	Adobe Flash			2007 (no release)	A prototype, unreleased
Blood Car 2000!	Adobe Flash	Cryptic Sea		2008	
Coil	Adobe Flash	Florian Himsl		2008	Included in The Basement Collection
Blood car! 2000! Delux!	Adobe Flash			2008	
DeadBaby VG Dressup	Adobe Flash			2008	
Twin Hobo Rocket	Adobe Flash	Florian Himsl		2008	
Cunt	Adobe Flash	Florian Himsl		2008	
Aether	Adobe Flash	Tyler Glaiel		2008	Included in The Basement Collection
Meat Boy	Adobe Flash			2008	Included in The Basement Collection
Clubby: Killing Season	Adobe Flash			2008	
Grey-Matter	Adobe Flash	Team Meat		2008	Included in The Basement Collection
Meat boy (map pack)	Adobe Flash			2008	
AVGM	Adobe Flash	Tyler Glaiel		2009	Included in The Basement Collection
Spewer	Adobe Flash			2009	Included in The Basement Collection
Time Fcuk	Adobe Flash			2009	Included in The Basement Collection
Super Meat Boy	Windows, OS X, Linux, Xbox 360, PS4, Nintendo Switch, PS Vita, Wii U	Team Meat	Team Meat	2010	First console game
The Binding of Isaac	Windows, OS X, Linux, Adobe Flash	Florian Himsl		2011	
The Binding of Isaac: Wrath of the Lamb	Windows, OS X, Linux	Florian Himsl		2012	Expansion for The Binding of Isaac
The Basement Collection	Windows, OS X, Linux	Tyler Glaiel		2012	Collection of Flash games
Facist	Adobe Flash			2014	Game jam game
The Binding of Isaac: Rebirth	Windows, OS X, Linux, PS4, PS Vita, New 3DS, Wii U, Xbox One, iOS	Nicalis	Nicalis	2014	Remake of The Binding of Isaac
Fingered	Windows	James Id		2015	
The Binding of Isaac: Afterbirth	Windows, PS4, Xbox One, OS X, Linux	Nicalis	Nicalis	2015	First expansion pack for The Binding of Isaac: Rebirth
The Binding of Isaac: Afterbirth+	Windows, OS X, Linux, Nintendo Switch, PS4, Xbox One	Nicalis	Nicalis	2017	Second expansion pack for The Binding of Isaac: Rebirth
The End Is Nigh	Windows, OS X, Linux, PS4, Nintendo Switch	Tyler Glaiel	Tyler Glaiel, Nicalis	2017	
The Binding of Isaac: Four Souls	Card game	Danielle McMillen, Tyler Glaiel	Studio71	2018	Based on The Binding of Isaac; Funded in less than two hours
The Legend of Bum-bo	Windows, OS X, Android, iOS, Nintendo Switch, PS5	James Id	The Label Limited, Nicalis	2019	Prequel to The Binding of Isaac
Tapeworm	Card game		Studio71	2020	
The Binding of Isaac: Repentance	Windows, Nintendo Switch, PS4, PS5, Xbox One, Xbox Series X/S	Nicalis	Nicalis	2021	Third expansion pack for The Binding of Isaac: Rebirth
Mewgenics	Windows, Nintendo Switch 2, PS5, Xbox Series X/S	Tyler Glaiel	Tyler Glaiel, Nicalis	2026	

=== Unreleased games ===
Name	Platforms	Year	State
Gish 2	None	2007–2008	Announced, later cancelled
No Quarter	None	2008–2009	Announced, later cancelled
Øuroboros	Windows	2016	Became The End is Nigh
Grub	Adobe Flash	2007	Cancelled
Tri-Achnid: Episode 2	Adobe Flash	2007–2008	Announced, later cancelled
Hitlers Must Die!	None	2009	Announced, then cancelled
The Book of Knots	None	2006–2007	Became Gish 2
Badlings	Adobe Flash	2006	Cancelled after a month
Office Yeti	None	2007	Cancelled
The Badlands	None	2004	Cancelled
Camdrome	None	2013	Cancelled
