= Indie Game: The Movie =

- Directed by: James Swirsky; Lisanne Pajot
- Produced by: James Swirsky; Lisanne Pajot
- Starring: Edmund McMillen; Tommy Refenes; Phil Fish; Jonathan Blow
- Cinematography: James Swirsky; Lisanne Pajot
- Edited by: James Swirsky; Lisanne Pajot
- Music by: Jim Guthrie
- Production companies: BlinkWorks; Flutter Media
- Distributed by: BlinkWorks Media
- Release dates: 20 January 2012 (Sundance); 12 June 2012 (digital distribution)
- Running time: 94 minutes (Canada); 103 minutes (International)
- Language: English

Indie Game: The Movie is a 2012 documentary film made by Canadian filmmakers James Swirsky and Lisanne Pajot. The film is about the struggles of independent game developers Edmund McMillen and Tommy Refenes during the development of Super Meat Boy, Phil Fish during the development of Fez, and also Jonathan Blow, who reflects on the success of Braid.

After two successful Kickstarter funds, interviews were conducted with prominent indie developers within the community. After recording over 300 hours of footage, Swirsky and Pajot decided to cut the movie down to follow the four developers selected. Their reasoning behind this was to show game development in the "past, present and future" tenses through each individual's story.

== Synopsis ==
The film shows the high level of personal expression that typically goes into independent games, through the story of three games: Braid was released in 2008, Super Meat Boy was preparing for its 2011 release (which would actually occur in 2010), while Fez was struggling with development hell for several years.

Braid developer Jonathan Blow recounts his thought process for the game: how he wished to put his "deepest flaws and vulnerabilities" into it and how his initial design experience quickly turned from experimentation to discovery. He also talks about the aftermath of the game: When Braid comes out, it receives widespread critical acclaim, but Blow is disillusioned, when a large portion of players don't "get" the underlying message and themes of the game. He makes attempts to influence the audience's impression of the game through forum posts and blog comments, but this eventually turns him into something of a comic figure, which he feels uncomfortable with. The game remains a commercial and critical success.

Super Meat Boy developers Team Meat (Edmund McMillen and Tommy Refenes) set out to do a platform game that harkens back to their own childhood video game experiences. McMillen talks about his lifelong goal of communicating to others through his work. He goes on to talk about his 2008 game Aether that chronicles his childhood feelings of loneliness, nervousness, and fear of abandonment. He also sheds light on the level design techniques he uses, on how he teaches players to play without extensive tutorials.

About a year into development, Microsoft offers Team Meat a chance to take part in an Xbox Live Arcade promotion called "Game Feast", under the condition that they finish the game in a month, which they reluctantly accept because of their dire financial situation. The development goes into crunch time, and takes its toll on McMillen's marriage, and on the health of Refenes, who bears the brunt of the work. Refenes also laments how he sacrificed his social life to get the game done, but expresses gratitude for his family being supportive of his goal. The team successfully delivers the game, but come release day, the game is nowhere to be found on Xbox Live, which greatly upsets Refenes, who predicts low sales as a result. The game does eventually appear on the marketplace, and doubles Super Meat Boy's sales, selling 20,000 units in the first 24 hours. McMillen is surprised by both the sales and touched by the fan reaction, and although Refenes, exhausted and cynical, is less enthusiastic, his joy shows through when he sees videos of people enjoying the game. The game eventually goes on to sell a million copies, providing a level of financial security to both developers.

Fez developer Polytron (Phil Fish and Renaud Bédard) is in the fourth year of the game's development: the game was first announced at Independent Games Festival 2008, which thrust Fish into the limelight as an "indie developer celebrity", but little was heard of the game since. The development is troubled, casting doubt on the future of the project. Fish himself admits to his perfectionism protracting the development, as well as losing perspective over time about how good the game really is. Similar to Refenes, Fish also notes that he does not see himself doing anything else other than indie games, saying that Fez has become his identity over time.

Polytron prepares to present Fez at Penny Arcade Expo, despite the possibility of a lawsuit lingering: Fish's original business partner (Jason DeGroot, who does not participate in the film) is yet to sign his side of a final separation deal, and as such, he could potentially block Polytron from presenting at PAX. This causes Fish to suffer anxiety attacks over the course of the preparation. The Fez kiosk is set up nevertheless, but the show runs into problems, when last minute changes in the build cause the game to often hang up or crash, forcing Fish to occasionally restart the game. The players are unfazed and continue to enjoy the game nevertheless; Fish gives a number of interviews, and Jerry Holkins expresses his excitement about the product as well. Towards the closing of the show, Fish's new partner Ken Schachter announces that he and the former business partner had a meeting and have come to an agreement, which relieves Fish, who in the end is satisfied with the results of the show, and vows to continue working on the game and releasing it in 2012 (which would ultimately occur).

The film bookends itself with Jonathan Blow's opening monologue about how indie gaming differs by offering flaws and vulnerabilities, making the games more personal. During the closing credits, videos of other upcoming indie games are interspersed.

== Reception ==
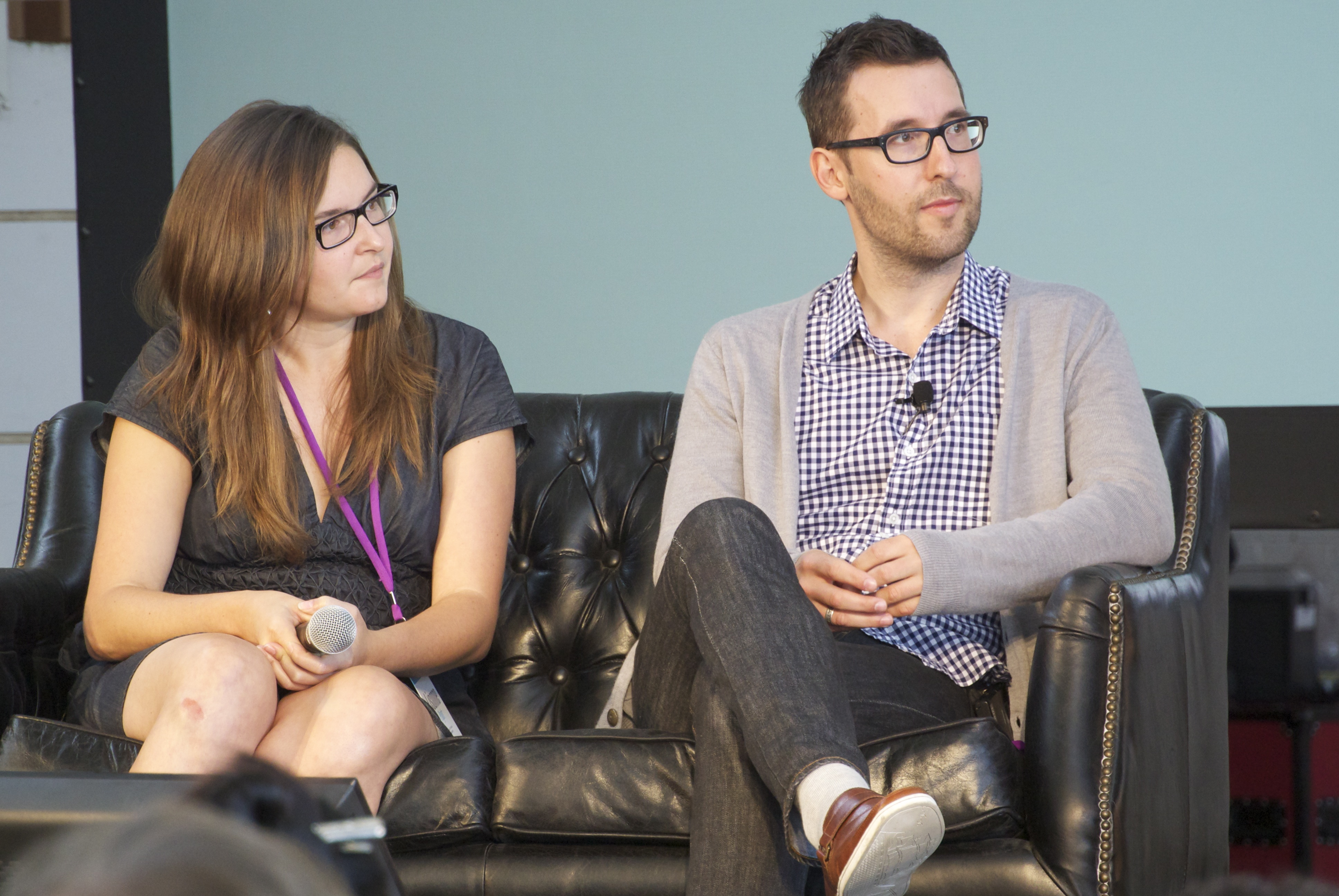
Directors Lisanne Pajot and James Swirsky, 2012

Indie Game: The Movie received a high level of interest from the gaming community almost from its inception. Rotten Tomatoes reports 93% approval based on reviews from 26 critics, with an average rating of 7.7/10. The film also holds a 73/100 average on Metacritic. G4 TV praised the film saying "Indie Game: The Movie is definitely worth your time, and should be seen by everyone in the video game industry on the publisher, developer, and consumer sides." Ain't It Cool News echoed these statements, stating that "there are victories, defeats, tears and smiles. Indie Game: The Movie is a must-see doc for anybody that fancies themselves a gamer or for anyone who gets sucked into a good underdog story."

The film was criticized for its one-sided portrayal of Phil Fish's ex-business partner, Jason DeGroot, who was portrayed by Fish as trying to sabotage Fez. DeGroot was neither interviewed nor shown in the film, and the film's credits originally stated that he "asked not to participate" in the film. Shawn McGrath, who worked with DeGroot on Dyad, said on Twitter that the disclaimer was "bullshit," calling the filmmakers "liars." Ken Schachter, Fish's new business partner shown later in the film, was also the executive producer of the film. Several days later, the message in the credits was silently revised to state DeGroot "was not asked" to be in the film.

=== Accolades ===
The film won the World Cinema Documentary Editing Award at the 2012 Sundance Film Festival.

Indie Game: The Movie was also named 'Best Documentary' by the Utah Film Critics Association and nominated for a Canadian Screen Award at the 1st Canadian Screen Awards in the category of 'Best Feature Length Documentary'.

== Release ==
The producers chose a non-traditional distribution method for the film, coupling the usual film festival circuit with a focused theater tour and aggressive online distribution. Online distribution was initially via iTunes and the gaming platform Steam with a DRM free release, expanded later to other online distribution services and direct downloads from the producers' website. The result of their distribution experiment has been documented by the directors online. Over 50% of gross revenue came from online distribution. The film premiered on Channel 4 in the United Kingdom on 30 November 2013, and was preceded by the documentary How Video Games Changed the World.

== Special Edition ==
On 24 July 2013, Indie Game: The Movie was rereleased with a special edition. Buyers of the new physical copy would receive a hand signed three-DVD box set including posters of the movie's logo and additional packaging artwork designed by Edmund McMillen. The announcement of additional content being released as pre-purchasable downloadable content (DLC) for Steam users and as a new physical version for collectors was met with mixed reactions some of which questioning the uncommonness of DLC for a movie. Both the original and the Special Edition continue to rate positively on Steam. It features over 100 minutes of additional short documentary content to the original film, also created by James Swirsky and Lisanne Pajot, including epilogues for Fish, McMillen, and Refenes two years after the film's conclusion.

=== Epilogues ===
Phil's epilogue picks up ten months later as Fez is nearing release, having been in its development cycle for five years. He discusses the game's growth, improvement, and closure after the events in IG:TM. It also features Polytron's win at the Independent Game Festival for the Seumas McNally Grand Prize in 2012.

Edmund reflects on the "life-changing" experience following the release and subsequent success of Super Meat Boy. Discussing how he continues to strive to remain working hard towards game development and seeks creative inspiration for new projects.

Tommy talks about the success of Super Meat Boy on Xbox Live and Steam pushing them into a level of financial security. Tommy and Edmund say how happy they are to be able to support their respective families following the financial success of Super Meat Boy.

The special edition also includes additional shorts regarding other independent game developer's experiences such as Jason Rohrer's Passage, Derek Yu's Spelunky, and Steph Thirion's Eliss, as well as two shorts regarding visual artist David Hellman's thematic choices for the aesthetic of Braid and multiple others regarding McMillen's and Refenes' earlier works (Tri-achnid, AVGM, and Coil) including lessons learned and their experiences and influences in development. In many of the shorts, emphasis is placed on how each developer's work was received and their experiences in dealing with the problems that their newfound notoriety brought. Short documentaries entitled “Edmund & Teh Internets”, “Tommy & Teh Internets”, and “Phil + Japan” all focus on each developer's struggle with maintaining a professional presence online as newly established and critically acclaimed independent developers, similar to Braid developer Jonathan Blow's struggles with popularity and presence on the internet in the original film.

Also featured is the trailer for the Special Edition, Phil Fish's first impression of the original IG:TM, Edmund McMillen showing their collection of official Super Meat Boy merchandise as well as the different kinds of fan-made submitted gifts they've received, and Tommy Refenes' reflections the immediate day following the release of Super Meat Boy.

Dedicated to its own short entitled "GameJam" is a documentary about the "TIGJam" (The Indie Game Jam) hosted in Mountain View, California by Spelunky creator Derek Yu and other indie game developers in 2013. It focuses on the community around independent games development, in particular the TIGSource online community and participants talking about their passions and inspirations for game design.
