= Spewer =

2009 video game

- Developers: Edmund McMillen; Eli Piilonen
- Publisher: Newgrounds
- Composer: Danny Baranowsky
- Platform: Browser
- Release: May 4, 2009
- Genre: Puzzle-platform
- Mode: Single-player

Spewer is a 2009 browser-based puzzle-platform game. It uses liquid physics through regurgitation as its core mechanic. Taking the role of a mysterious test subject, code named "Spewer", the player must vomit their way through over 60 levels while learning new abilities, changing forms and piecing together their purpose in the game. It is also a part of The Basement Collection.

== Gameplay ==
The player navigates through five chapters and a bonus chapter as Spewer, a small creature that navigates through single-screen levels by utilizing its own vomit as a platform. Spewer can also walk, jump, and swim. The amount of vomit available to the player is represented by a meter, which can be replaced by Spewer eating food or its own vomit. There are four types of vomit in addition to normal vomit which are accessed by eating pills: white vomit that floats, allowing the player to swim in mid air, red vomit that pushes the player off objects at a faster speed with more power, black vomit hardens to become platforms, and yellow vomit that melts and burns objects. A level editor is included, allowing players to create their own custom levels.

== Development ==
Spewer was developed by Edmund McMillen and Eli Piilonen and released on Newgrounds on May 4, 2009. A group of four people developed Spewer: Edmund McMillen created the art assets for the game, and Eli Piilonen was the programmer. These two also handled game design elements together. In addition, Jordan Fehr worked on the sound effects and Daniel Baranowsky provided the music.

== Reception ==
Macintosh gaming magazine MacLife's Arvind Srinivasan described the game as "incredibly addictive", stating that the game managed to hold his attention during the full 60 levels, Spewer was awarded the magazine's Editors' Choice award. Independent video game developer Derek Yu stated the game is the most mature title which McMillen has developed in terms of design.
