= The Binding of Isaac: Rebirth =

2014 indie video game

- Developer: Nicalis
- Publisher: Nicalis
- Designer: Edmund McMillen
- Artist: Edmund McMillen
- Composer: Ridiculon
- Platforms: Linux; Microsoft Windows; macOS; PlayStation 4; PlayStation Vita; New Nintendo 3DS; Wii U; Xbox One; iOS; Nintendo Switch; Nintendo Switch 2; PlayStation 5; Xbox Series X/S; tvOS
- Release: November 4, 2014: Linux, Windows, OS X; WW: November 4, 2014 PS4, PS Vita; NA: November 4, 2014; EU: November 5, 2014 New 3DS, Wii U; NA: July 23, 2015; EU: October 29, 2015 Xbox One; NA: July 23, 2015; EU: December 9, 2015 iOS; WW: January 11, 2017; Afterbirth October 30, 2015: Linux, Windows, OS X; WW: October 30, 2015 PS4, Xbox One; WW: May 10, 2016; Afterbirth+ January 3, 2017: Windows; WW: January 3, 2017 Nintendo Switch (Note: Standalone release); NA: March 17, 2017; EU: September 7, 2017 PlayStation 4; WW: September 19, 2017 Xbox One; WW: October 24, 2019; Repentance March 31, 2021: Windows; WW: March 31, 2021 PS5, Xbox Series X/S; WW: November 4, 2021 PS4, Xbox One; WW: November 4, 2021 Nintendo Switch; NA: November 4, 2021; EU: 2021 tvOS; WW: October 4, 2023; Repentance+ November 18, 2024: Windows; WW: November 18, 2024 (public beta as free DLC) Nintendo Switch 2, PS5, Xbox Series X/S; WW: November 19, 2026
- Genres: Roguelike, action-adventure
- Modes: Single-player, multiplayer

The Binding of Isaac: Rebirth is a 2014 roguelike action-adventure game designed by Edmund McMillen and developed and published by Nicalis. Rebirth was released for Linux, Microsoft Windows, macOS, PlayStation 4 and PlayStation Vita in November 2014, for Xbox One, New Nintendo 3DS and Wii U in July 2015, for iOS in January 2017, for Nintendo Switch in March 2017, for PlayStation 5 and Xbox Series X/S in November 2021, and for Nintendo Switch 2 in November 2026.

Rebirth is a remake of The Binding of Isaac, which was developed by McMillen and Florian Himsl and released in 2011 as an Adobe Flash application. This platform had limitations and led McMillen to work with Nicalis to produce Rebirth with a more advanced game engine, which in turn enabled the substantial addition of content and gameplay features. Since release, Rebirth has had four expansions: Afterbirth (2015), Afterbirth+ (2017), Repentance (2021) and Repentance+ (2024) with more game content and gameplay modes. Afterbirth+ also added support for user-created content.

Similar to the original The Binding of Isaac, the plot is based on the biblical story of the same name and was inspired by McMillen's religious upbringing. The player controls Isaac, a young boy whose mother, convinced that she is doing God's work, strips him of everything and locks him in his room. When Isaac's mother is about to kill him, he escapes to the basement and fights through random, roguelike dungeons. The player defeats monsters, using Isaac's tears as projectiles, and collects items which modify his appearance, attributes, and abilities, potentially creating powerful combinations. Unlike the game's predecessor, Rebirth has a limited multiplayer mode, allowing an additional player in Rebirth, later increased to three additional players in Afterbirth and Afterbirth+. Full local co-op support was added to Repentance, where up to four players are able to play as any of the playable characters. Online co-op support was added in November 2024 with Repentance+.

Rebirth released to critical acclaim. Reviewers praised its gameplay and improvements compared to the original The Binding of Isaac, but criticized its graphic imagery. Afterbirth, Afterbirth+ and Repentance also had a generally favorable reception, with reviewers criticizing their difficulty but praising their added content. By July 2015, Rebirth and The Binding of Isaac had sold over five million copies combined. The game is often regarded as one of the best roguelike games of all time. (Note: Attributed to multiple sources:)

== Gameplay ==
Gameplay of The Binding of Isaac: Rebirth with the Repentance DLC, showing the player using the Isaac character to fight enemies in the "Downpour" floor

Like the original, The Binding of Isaac: Rebirth is a top-down 2D game in which the player controls the boy Isaac, amongst thirty three other unlockable characters, as he traverses the basement and beyond, fighting off monsters and collecting items. The gameplay is presented in a roguelike style; the levels are procedurally generated through a random seed into a number of self-contained rooms, including at least one boss battle. A run is completed by beating one of a number of different final bosses. Like most roguelike games, it has permadeath: when the player character dies, the game is over. Rebirth allows a play-through to be saved at any point. Map seeds can be shared, allowing for multiple people to try the same dungeon layout. However, seeded runs do not earn a player achievements, preventing players from using seeds which make getting these achievements easier.

The game is controlled similarly to a multidirectional shooter: the player moves the character with one set of controls, while 'shooting' tears with the other; the tears are bullets which defeat enemies. The player-character's health is represented by a number of hearts (in halves). The character can find items which replenish hearts; other items give the character additional hearts, increasing their number. Throughout the dungeons, the player can find bombs to damage foes and destroy obstacles; keys to open doors and treasure chests; and coins to buy items. Many items impact the character's attributes (such as speed and the damage and range of the character's tears) and other gameplay effects, including a character who floats behind the player-character and aids in combat. Items are either passive, granting permanent effects on pickup, or active, which can be used at any point and are either consumed on use or recharged by clearing rooms. The player can collect any number of passive items, whose effects build on each other with the potential to create powerful combinations. The player can only carry one active item at a time. The player can also carry one consumable, mostly tarot cards or pills with various effects, and one trinket, which act similarly to passive items except that they can be swapped out. Each floor contains a number of special rooms, such as treasure rooms, shops, mini-boss fights, dice pip rooms, arcades, vaults, planetariums, and curse rooms.

In addition to expanding The Binding of Isaac's number of items, monsters, and room types (including those spanning multiple screens), Rebirth provides integrated controller support and allows a second local player to join in with a drop-in-drop-out mechanic. The second player controls a follower of the first player-character with the same attributes and abilities of that character, costing the first player-character one heart. The second character cannot plant bombs or carry items. The Repentance expansion adds support for a 4-player co-op, where the extra players control fully functional characters.

== Plot ==
The Binding of Isaac: Rebirth's plot loosely follows the biblical story of the same name, similar to the original game. The game's story is primarily told through ending cutscenes obtained from defeating bosses, which are either still images with narration or animations.

Isaac, a small child, and his deeply religious mother live in a small house on a hill. Isaac's mother hears what she believes is the voice of God, stating her son is corrupted with sin, and needs to be saved. She removes all his possessions, including toys and clothing, believing they are corrupting agents, and later locks him in his room to protect him from the evil outside. When she receives instructions to sacrifice her son to prove her devotion, Isaac flees through a trap door in his room.

After venturing through various floors, Isaac battles his mother. After defeating her, the game cuts back to Isaac in his room, where his mother is about to kill him with a knife. A Bible falls off a shelf and strikes Isaac's mother in the head, apparently killing her. Isaac celebrates, but his mother appears behind him, alive and still wielding the knife, revealing the entire sequence to be imagined.

Defeating other bosses unlocks a variety of other endings. These endings generally imply that Isaac, due to overwhelming religious guilt, locked himself in a toy chest and asphyxiated, with the events of the game being a hallucination.

=== Expansions ===
The game's expansions add several more endings. These expand on Isaac's background: his father abandoned the family and his mother has been abusing him since. In the final ending, Isaac ascends to Heaven as his life flashes before his eyes. However, the narrator, whom Isaac refers to as his father, interjects. The narrator asks if Isaac wants to change the story, and Isaac agrees. The narrator begins to tell a new story, featuring Isaac and both of his parents. There is also the Repentance+ expansion which adds the ability to play co-op online with up to 4 players, among other features.

== Development ==
The Binding of Isaac was developed by Edmund McMillen and Florian Himsl in 2011 during a game jam after the completion of Super Meat Boy, McMillen's previous game. Since Super Meat Boy was successful, McMillen was not concerned about making a popular game; he wanted to craft a game which melded The Legend of Zelda's top-down dungeon approach with the roguelike genre, wrapping it in religious allegory inspired by his upbringing. They used Adobe Flash, since it enabled them to develop the game quickly. McMillen quietly released the game to Steam for PC, where it unexpectedly became very popular. Wanting to expand the game, McMillen and Himsl discovered limitations in Flash which made an expansion difficult. Although they could incorporate more content with the Wrath of the Lamb expansion, McMillen had to abandon a second expansion due to the limitations.

The Binding of Isaac: Rebirth's designer, Edmund McMillen, in 2012

After The Binding of Isaac's release, Eddy Austin was approached by Tyrone Rodriguez of Nicalis (a development and publishing studio which had helped bring the PC games Cave Story and VVVVVV to consoles). Rodriguez offered Nicalis' services to help port The Binding of Isaac to consoles. McMillen was interested, but required they recreate the game outside Flash to incorporate the additional content he had to forego and fix additional bugs found since release. He also asked to be left out of the business side of the game's release (after his negative experiences dealing with business matters with Super Meat Boy), and Rodriguez agreed. Rebirth was announced in November 2012 as a console version of The Binding of Isaac, with plans to improve its graphics to 16-bit colors and incorporate the new content and material originally planned for the second expansion. Local cooperative play would also be added to the game, but McMillen said that they could not add online cooperative play because it would drastically lengthen development time.

McMillen wanted to overhaul the entire game, particularly its graphics (which he called an "eyesore"). After polling players about which art style to use for the remake, McMillen and Nicalis brought in artists to improve the original assets in the new style and began working on the new content. McMillen commissioned a new soundtrack for the remake from Matthias Bossi and Jon Evans.

=== Release ===
McMillen and Rodriguez initially wanted to develop The Binding of Isaac: Rebirth for the Nintendo 3DS as a tribute to its roots in Nintendo's Legend of Zelda series. Nintendo, however, did not authorize the game's release for the 3DS in 2012 for content reasons. Although they had spent some time creating the 3DS version, McMillen and Rodriguez decided to focus on PC and PlayStation versions instead; those platforms allowed them to increase the game's capabilities. In addition to the PlayStation 3 and Vita consoles, Nicalis was in discussions with Microsoft for a release on the Xbox systems and McMillen had also considered a future iOS release. McMillen and Nicalis opted to move development from the PlayStation 3 to the new PlayStation 4 in August 2013, announcing its release at Sony's Gamescom presentation. The PlayStation 4 and Vita versions were released with the PC versions on November 5, 2014.

During development, three senior Nintendo employees—Steve Singer, vice president of licensing; Mark Griffin, a senior manager in licensing, and indie development head Dan Adelman—championed the game within the company. They continued to work within Nintendo, and secured approval of Rebirth's release for the 3DS and Wii U in 2014. McMillen and Nicalis, after tailoring the game to run on more powerful systems, worked to keep it intact for the 3DS port. They spent about a year on the conversion and, although they got the game to work on the original 3DS, its performance was sub-optimal. They were one of the first developers (with Nintendo's help) to obtain a development kit for the New Nintendo 3DS, which had more powerful hardware and memory to run the game at a speed matching that of the other platforms. The announcement of the New 3DS and Wii U versions was made with plans for an Xbox One version, and the game was released for all three systems on July 23, 2015.

In January 2016, Nicalis reported that it was working on an iOS port of the game. The company reported the following month that Apple rejected its application to Apple's app, citing "violence towards children" violating content policies. Nicalis has worked with Apple to obtain preapproval and will release a universal iOS version of Rebirth (including the Afterbirth+ expansion) with improvements for that platform, including the use of iCloud for ease of play on multiple devices. Although Nicalis wants to add this to the Vita port, the company said it was a low priority due to the Vita's limited ability to handle many weapon combos. The initial iOS version of the core game, without expansions, was released on January 11, 2017.

After hinting at a release on the upcoming Nintendo Switch console, Nicalis confirmed in January 2017 that Rebirth (with both expansions) would be released for the Switch in March 2017 as retail and digital titles. Scheduled for release on March 3 as a launch title, last-minute adjustments required the company to delay it until March 17. Because of the existing relationship with Nintendo for the Wii U and New Nintendo 3DS versions, Rodriguez said that they could obtain developer-prototype hardware for the Switch to port the game to that system. McMillen said that they could get Rebirth working on the Switch easily due to their approach to developing the game (with hooking integrated into respective system features, such as achievements, to simplify porting) and the ease of the Switch's development platform. The game was released for Switch on March 17, 2017. The version allows up to four players in a drop-in/drop-out cooperative mode, with the other three players using Joy-Con to control one of Isaac's "buddies" (similar to the two-player cooperative mode for PC). The physical version of the Switch game includes a manual similar to the manual which shipped with The Legend of Zelda for the Nintendo Entertainment System.

=== Expansions ===
==== Afterbirth ====
McMillen announced The Binding of Isaac: Afterbirth, the first expansion for Rebirth, in February 2015. Afterbirth added items, enemies, alternate floors and bosses, and endings (including Greed Mode, which differs from the main game by its focus on money, and is reportedly more difficult). Afterbirth was released on October 30, 2015, for Windows, OS X, and Linux computers. The expansion was released for the PlayStation 4 and Xbox One versions on May 10, 2016. The expansion is unlikely to be released on any other platforms due to limitations in the platforms' hardware capabilities and Afterbirth's more complex mechanics.

McMillen had programmed a number of hidden secrets into The Binding of Isaac (which fans were discovering and discussing on a Reddit subforum), and took additional care to hide them in patches and updates. He knew that players would be looking for hidden secrets in Rebirth, and took steps to completely hide the Lost (a new playable character). Unlocking it required a number of steps (including having the player-character repeatedly die in specific circumstances), and hints for what needed to be done were scattered among the game's assets; therefore, McMillen and his team anticipated that it would take a long time before players would discover the Lost. However, players on the Reddit subforum went to its executable files to search for clues to secrets and discovered the Lost (and how to unlock it) within 109 hours of the game's release. McMillen said that he was disappointed with the community because his team hid the secrets for discovery in gameplay and clues in the game; although he still planned to release Afterbirth, he said that he would not rush its release.

McMillen wanted to hide the Keeper (another character) and elements already hinted at in the game about Isaac's father in Afterbirth, but knew that players would data-mine its program files to find them; instead, he planned an alternate reality game (ARG) which would require players to discover real-world clues. Since he expected the birth of his daughter at the end of September 2015 and the expansion was planned for release in October, he arranged the ARG to continue without him. When Afterbirth was released, players found what they thought were bugs (such as missing new items which had been promised on the game's store page); some accused McMillen of deceiving them. Although some of these omissions were planned as part of the ARG, McMillen discovered that the released game accidentally lacked some new items because it used a different build than originally planned. His team raced to patch the game and tried to provide support (and hints) about the Keeper, using the number 109. McMillen later said that the items missing from the released game distracted players from the secrets he had hidden.

With the release of the patch, players began discovering in-game hints about the Keeper and engaged in McMillen's ARG as planned. Clues included calling a special phone number and identifying actual locations in the Santa Cruz area (where McMillen lives) which were related to the game. Following additional clues (including locating a buried figure of one of the game's mini-bosses), they unlocked the Keeper and additional in-game items to collect. Although McMillen thought that the ARG ultimately worked out, he would not engage the community in a similar manner again to avoid seeming egotistical.

==== Afterbirth+ ====
Nicalis announced in December 2015 that a second expansion, Afterbirth+, was in development. In addition to adding monsters, bosses, items and a playable character called Apollyon to the game, the expansion includes a bestiary which tracks how many of each type of creature (and boss) the player has defeated and modding support to allow players to craft room types, import graphics, and script events with Lua. The expansion was released for Windows on January 3, 2017, and for PlayStation 4 on September 19, 2017. The expansion later released to Xbox One as downloadable content on October 24, 2019. The Switch version of the game was released in North America on March 17, 2017, and in Europe and Australia on September 7 of that year. This version includes Afterbirth and Afterbirth+; limited-time launch editions of the game are available physically and digitally, making it the first Nicalis-published game to be released physically.

Some of the best community mods were added to the game in "booster packs" (initially planned monthly, becoming less frequent), with the first release in March 2017 and the fifth (and final) release on May 1, 2018. The last two packs include material developed by players who created the Antibirth fan expansion and whom McMillen enlisted.

==== Repentance ====
Before the release of Afterbirth+, The Binding of Isaac: Antibirth (a fan-made mod of Rebirth) was released in December 2016. Similar to the official expansions, Antibirth adds playable characters, bosses, power-ups and other content, and reverts some gameplay aspects (which had been changed in the Afterbirth expansion) to their original Rebirth version. Alice O'Connor of Rock, Paper, Shotgun called the mod "more difficult than [The Binding of Isaac]" and a new challenge compatible with the official game expansions. At McMillen's request, the group reworked some Antibirth content (which was incorporated into the Afterbirth+ booster packs). McMillen said at PAX West in September 2018 that Antibirth would be made into Repentance (official DLC for Rebirth), and he was working with some of the mod's creators on balance tweaking and ensuring that its narrative was consistent with Isaac.

The expansion was released for PC on March 31, 2021. Repentance was released for Nintendo Switch, PlayStation 4, PlayStation 5, Xbox One, and Xbox Series X/S on November 4, 2021.

==== Repentance+ ====
Announced in 2023, the next expansion was released as an open beta on November 18, 2024 for the 10th anniversary of the game, and features online multiplayer, a much-requested feature from fans of the game. The end of an online match features an arena where players battle one another using items found throughout the run, or preset builds. The expansion also features a number of item and quality of life tweaks, like the highly requested "internal Item Descriptions" feature which was added to the Repentance+ Beta on September 10, 2025.

Repentance+ received a standalone release for Nintendo Switch 2, PlayStation 5, and Xbox Series X/S on November 19, 2026.

=== Future development ===
Although McMillen wanted to support the modding community and its expansions as part of The Binding of Isaac: Rebirth, he found that several ideas began overlapping with his own thoughts about what a sequel to The Binding of Isaac should be; in addition, further expansion of the game would require him to rework the base game engine. With the last booster packs (containing Antibirth content), he considered The Binding of Isaac complete. The addition of the Antibirth content somewhat extends the game, but McMillen does not plan any more updates. He plans to continue to develop The Binding of Isaac franchise; a prequel, The Legend of Bum-bo, was released on November 12, 2019. During an investigation by Kotaku exploring questionable business practices and behavior from Nicalis, McMillen announced that he would sever his working relationship with the company, with Repentance being their final planned collaboration. McMillen recanted his stance with Nicalis in January 2021, citing Rodriguez's adjusted behavior. Nicalis published McMillen's further works, including the console versions of The Legend of Bum-bo in 2022. Nicalis also released the Repentance+ expansion in 2024.

== Reception and legacy ==
Reception

Aggregate score
| Aggregator | Score |
|---|---|
| Metacritic | PC: 86/100; PS4: 88/100; 3DS: 78/100 (Afterbirth) PC: 85/100 iOS: 93/100; NS: 85/100 |

Review scores
| Publication | Score |
|---|---|
| Destructoid | 10/10 |
| Eurogamer | 9/10 |
| GameSpot | 8/10 |
| IGN | 9/10 |
| Nintendo Life | 8/10 |
| Nintendo World Report | 8/10 |
| Pocket Gamer | 4/5 |
| Push Square | 8/10 |
| TouchArcade | 5/5 |

According to review aggregator website Metacritic, The Binding of Isaac: Rebirth received "generally favorable" reviews; the iOS version received "universal acclaim". Dan Stapleton of IGN praised Rebirth for the seemingly-endless variation in gameplay created by each run-through, giving him "plenty of motivation" to continue playing; his only criticism was its lack of in-game information on available power-ups. GameSpot's Brent Todd wrote that while the game's story and imagery may be initially disturbing, Rebirth has "speedy, varied gameplay and seemingly never-ending new features" which would keep the player entertained for a long time. Simon Parkin of Eurogamer said that Rebirth "feels like the product of the psychotherapeutic process", but is "the most accessible Rogue-like [game] yet made" due to its easy control scheme and randomization of each run. Nic Rowen of Destructoid said that Rebirth was a great improvement on The Binding of Isaac, "an incredible experience that can't be missed".

Afterbirth+ received mixed-to-favorable reviews from critics. Jose Otero of IGN praised its variety: "The unpredictable items and varied enemies make it one of the most wacky and replayable games I've ever experienced." Although Peter Glagowksi of Destructoid gave its DLC a positive review, calling it an "impressive effort", he wrote that the DLC's base content has little to offer newcomers to the series.

Repentance + Online received critical acclaim, with Metacritic designating the Nintendo Switch 2 version with "universal acclaim".

Rock, Paper, Shotgun was critical of the DLC's difficulty, which it thought was largely derived from random, untelegraphed enemy behavior. About Afterbirth+'s design cohesion, reviewer Adam Smith characterized its DLC as "mashing together existing parts of the game and producing either a weak cover version or a clumsy remix". Review website Beastby criticized Afterbirth+'s fairness: "The question isn't always 'Will I enjoy the gameplay loop?' but rather 'How many unfair runs will it take for me to have one in which I stand a chance?'" The expansion's modding application programming interface was called "a disappointment" by members of the Team Alpha modding group, who expressed frustration with the API's "massive shortcomings" and Nicalis' lack of support.

The game has remained popular since its release. It saw renewed interest in 2021 after the release of the Repentance DLC, reaching a peak of 70 thousand concurrent players on Steam. After the game and its DLC were on sale for 90% off on Steam in June 2026, it received a new surge of players. The concurrent player count peaked at 156 thousand, becoming the tenth most played game on the platform. According to McMillen, nearly 4 million people bought the game during the sale.

== See also ==
- The Binding of Isaac
- The Binding of Isaac: Four Souls
- Mewgenics
