= Super Meat Boy =

2010 video game

- Developer: Team Meat
- Publisher: Team Meat
- Producer: Kevin Hathaway
- Designers: Edmund McMillen; Tommy Refenes
- Programmer: Tommy Refenes
- Artist: Edmund McMillen
- Composer: Danny Baranowsky (Note: Ridiculon, David Scatliffe, and Laura Shigihara composed for the PS4, PS Vita, Wii U, and Switch versions, replacing Baranowsky's original soundtrack after a licensing disagreement.)
- Engine: Tommunism Engine
- Platforms: Xbox 360; Windows; OS X; Linux; PlayStation 4; PlayStation Vita; Android (Nvidia Shield); Wii U; Nintendo Switch
- Release: October 20, 2010: Xbox 360; WW: October 20, 2010; Windows; WW: November 30, 2010; OS X; WW: November 18, 2011; Linux; WW: December 13, 2011; PlayStation 4, PlayStation Vita; WW: October 6, 2015; Android (Nvidia Shield); WW: April 2016; Wii U; WW: May 12, 2016; Switch; WW: January 11, 2018
- Genre: Platform
- Mode: Single-player

Super Meat Boy is a 2010 platformer game developed and published by American indie studio Team Meat. It was designed by Edmund McMillen and Tommy Refenes as the successor to Meat Boy, a 2008 Flash game designed by McMillen and Jonathan McEntee. In the game, the player controls Meat Boy, a red, cube-shaped character, as he attempts to rescue his girlfriend, Bandage Girl, from the game's antagonist Dr. Fetus. The gameplay is characterized by fine control and split-second timing, as the player runs and jumps through over 300 hazardous levels while avoiding obstacles. The game also supports the creation of player-created levels. Super Meat Boy was first released on the Xbox 360 through Xbox Live Arcade in October 2010, and was later ported to Microsoft Windows, OS X, Linux, PlayStation 4, PlayStation Vita, Wii U, and the Nintendo Switch. A Wii version was in development but was ultimately cancelled.

Development of the game began in early 2009. McMillen worked on level design and artwork, while Refenes coded it. The game's soundtrack was written by Danny Baranowsky, who had also worked on the original Meat Boy. Super Meat Boy won several awards and has been cited as one of the greatest video games of all time. Critics lauded the game's controls, art, soundtrack, and challenging gameplay. The game was also a commercial success, selling over a million copies by January 2012. A sequel, Super Meat Boy Forever, was released on December 23, 2020; another sequel, Super Meat Boy 3D, was released on March 31, 2026, both without McMillen's involvement. A remaster Super Meat Boy+ was announced in November 2026.

== Gameplay ==
Players navigate Meat Boy through each level while avoiding traps and hazards, such as saw blades and crumbling blocks.

Super Meat Boy is a platform game in which players control a small, dark red, cube-shaped character named Meat Boy, who must save his cube-shaped, heavily bandaged girlfriend Bandage Girl from the evil scientist Dr. Fetus. The game is divided into chapters, which together contain over 300 levels. Players attempt to reach the end of each level, represented by Bandage Girl, while avoiding crumbling blocks, saw blades, and various other fatal obstacles. The player can jump and run on platforms, and can jump off or slide down walls. The core gameplay requires fine control and split-second timing, and was compared to, regarding both gameplay and level of difficulty, traditional platform games such as Super Mario Bros. and Ghosts 'n Goblins.

Levels in each chapter can be played in any order, but a certain number of levels need to be completed to access the boss stage, which unlocks the next chapter if cleared. The player has an unlimited number of attempts to complete each level. If Meat Boy is killed, he immediately restarts the level, though the ornamental red meat juice left behind on surfaces that the player has touched remains. A replay function, which may be accessed after a level is completed, simultaneously shows all the player's attempts to complete the level. Completing a level within a certain time earns an "A+" grade, which unlocks a harder alternate version of the level in the "dark world", an optional set of especially difficult levels. Hidden stages called warp zones are accessed by finding portals in specific levels. These warp zones feature bonus levels that have either the art style of older video games and a limit of three lives, or are patterned after another indie video game such as Castle Crashers or Braid. The player may control characters other than Meat Boy, many of whom first appeared in other independent video games. Each character has different attributes, such as Commander Video's ability to momentarily float in midair. These characters can be unlocked by collecting bandage items placed throughout the game's levels or completing certain warp zones. Some bandages can only be collected by using certain characters. Some levels, such as warp zones and boss levels, can only be played with specific characters. The available characters vary depending on the version of the game played.

The Xbox Live Arcade (XBLA) version features an unlockable mode called "Teh Internets", which is updated with new, free, officially curated levels. The PC version has a "Super Meat World" section, which allows users to play and rate additional levels that players have created with a level editor. This editor was released in May 2011. Players can also access an unsupported developer mode inside the game to edit their own levels using the "rough" tools that Team Meat used to create the game.

== Plot ==
The game's opening describes that Meat Boy (a boy born without skin) and his girlfriend Bandage Girl (a girl whose body is covered in bandages) love one another, though the antagonist Dr. Fetus (an intelligent fetus in a jar piloting a mechanical body) is unloved: thus, he hates everybody.

One day, Bandage Girl is kidnapped by Dr. Fetus in a fit of jealousy. Meat Boy proceeds to chase Dr. Fetus to rescue her, though the latter causes a forest fire and pursues Meat Boy in a large mech "Lil' Slugger". Lil' Slugger is destroyed after Meat Boy tricks the doctor into piloting it into a variety of hazards. Dr. Fetus then escapes to an abandoned hospital where he unleashes a giant monster made of blood "C.H.A.D". Meat Boy causes it to evaporate upon exposing the creature to sunlight, and kills it offscreen by smothering the creature with a pillow before continuing after Dr. Fetus, who has ventured to an abandoned salt factory. There, Dr. Fetus creates an evil clone of Meat Boy from his own feces "Brownie" who he directs to attack Meat Boy, though the two are interrupted from fighting when salt floods the factory, presumably killing Brownie. Dr. Fetus then ventures to hell, with Meat Boy discovering that, due to the game's difficulty, a variety of Meat Boy corpses are present. A large golem, "Little Horn", is created from these corpses, though it kills itself by repeatedly slamming its own head into the ground, allowing Dr. Fetus to escape whilst triggering a nuclear missile, which causes the rapture and opens a path to a ruined city. There, Meat Boy fights three large worms, "The Larries", tricking them into jumping into sawblades.

In the final level, Dr. Fetus, frustrated by Meat Boy's ability to respawn, chases him wielding a rocket launcher, though Meat Boy manages to destroy Dr. Fetus' mechanical body by destroying a bridge he stands on during the fight. Dr. Fetus tries to kill Meat Boy and Bandage Girl by triggering a self-destruct sequence, though is unsuccessful when Brownie reappears to save the two, sacrificing himself. As Bandage Girl hugs Meat Boy after escaping, Dr. Fetus suddenly lands on Bandage Girl and tries to pummel her as the game cuts to credits. If Dr. Fetus is beaten in the Dark World, It is shown in an extended ending that Fetus's attacks were ineffective and Bandage Girl proceeds to stomp on him.

A bonus chapter "Cotton Alley" appears after beating the game in which Meat Boy is kidnapped by Dr. Fetus, and Bandage Girl must save him.

== Development and marketing ==
The original Meat Boy is an Adobe Flash game created by Edmund McMillen and programmed by Jonathan McEntee. The game was developed over a three-week period and was released on Newgrounds on October 5, 2008. By April 2009, it had garnered over 840,000 views at Newgrounds, and 8 million overall. A map pack for the Flash version was released on December 8, 2008. McMillen began development of Super Meat Boy after Nintendo and Microsoft requested that he make a game for their download services, WiiWare and Xbox Live Arcade, as they were impressed by the success of his Flash games Aether and Meat Boy. At the time, he was working with Tommy Refenes on a Flash game titled Grey Matter. Although McMillen initially pitched the companies a sequel to Gish or Aether, the pair decided to form Team Meat and work on an expanded version of Meat Boy instead. Team Meat also includes soundtrack composer Danny Baranowsky and sound effects designer Jordan Fehr. According to the developers, Super Meat Boy is "a big throwback to a lot of super hardcore NES classics like Ghosts 'n Goblins, Mega Man, and the Japanese version of Super Mario Bros. 2", with the plot written as "a mash-up of every videogame story from the early 90s". The game was explicitly designed by the team to be reminiscent of Super Mario Bros., and McMillen considered it a tribute to Shigeru Miyamoto, the developer of Super Mario Bros.

McMillen (left) and Refenes at Indie Game: The Movie 2012 GDC panel

McMillen worked on level design and artwork, while Refenes coded the game; it was tested primarily by the pair and their families. McMillen and Refenes lived on opposite sides of the United States, and met only a few times in person while working on the game. They developed the control scheme by iterating through several designs, trying to find one that felt fluid and logical. Rather than use a pre-built game engine, Refenes programmed an original one. The game was initially set to include around 100 levels, and to have co-operative and competitive multiplayer modes. During development, however, the multiplayer option was dropped and the number of levels was greatly increased. The pair designed the game to be deliberately "retro", imitating the aesthetics of traditional platform games, but with a modern sensibility regarding difficulty. They wanted the game to be rewarding and challenging, rather than frustrating; to this end they included infinite lives, quick restarts of levels, obvious goals, and short levels. They felt the replay feature transformed death into a form of reward.

Development of Super Meat Boy began in January 2009. Initially announced for WiiWare and PC, the game was set to be released in the first quarter of 2010. The release date was pushed back to the fourth quarter because the developers wanted more time to create extra levels, such as the dark worlds. A picture released on Team Meat's Twitter page on February 22, 2010, revealed that the game would also be released for XBLA. The next day, they announced that, while all versions would be released in the same month, the game would be released for XBLA first due to "contractual obligations". In August 2010, the developers were contacted by Microsoft with the prospect of inclusion in Microsoft's 2010 Fall GameFeast XBLA promotion two months later. As they were almost out of money, they did not believe that they could financially support themselves until the Spring event, but felt they had four months' worth of work left to complete on the game. For the final two months of development they worked daily, slept five hours a night, and frequently forgot to eat—a process that McMillen said he "would never voluntarily go through" again. According to McMillen, due to Microsoft's low expectations for the game, Super Meat Boy was lightly promoted. The level of promotion was not increased during the GameFeast, though the game greatly outsold the rest of the games in the event. The team described the effort required to finish the game for the promotion as "by far the biggest mistake [they] made during SMB's development". Their development struggle is depicted in the documentary Indie Game: The Movie. The game was released on XBLA in October 2010 and on PCs via Steam and Direct2Drive a month later. McMillen noted that the PC release was more heavily promoted than the XBLA version. A version for Mac OS X was released in November 2011, while another version for Linux operating systems was released in December 2011 as part of the Humble Indie Bundle #4 game pack.

Due to Sony's initial lack of interest in the game, Team Meat entered into contractual obligations that prohibited Super Meat Boy from ever being released on the PlayStation 3. Despite this, a version for the PlayStation 4 and PlayStation Vita was eventually announced. The WiiWare version was canceled because the game's file size had been expanded beyond the limits imposed by Nintendo. Team Meat looked into releasing it as a retail Wii game, but were told by all third-party publishers they approached that a budget title would not be profitable so late into the Wii's lifecycle. Versions of the game were eventually released for Nintendo's follow up systems Wii U and the Switch. The PlayStation 4, PlayStation Vita, Wii U, and Switch ports were produced by BlitWorks. The Switch version includes a platform-exclusive "Race Mode", allowing two players on the Switch's split-screen and using separate Joy-Con to race through sets of levels. This mode was added to the Windows version in October 2018.

A limited edition retail version of the PC game was released in April 2011. It included bonuses such as behind-the-scenes videos, a sample disc of the game's music, and a Super Meat Boy comic. In 2012 Team Meat began prototyping an iOS and Android version of the game. The game was intended to be a different take on the Super Meat Boy concept that is more adapted to touch-screen controls than a direct port would be. This project would develop into the new endless runner game Super Meat Boy Forever, revealed in 2014 at the video game convention PAX.

Team Meat released several pieces of merchandise related to Super Meat Boy. These include Super Meat Boy Handheld, an iOS app released on April 3, 2010, and styled on a Tiger Electronics handheld. It was released as a joke after Refenes' game Zits & Giggles was removed from the iTunes Store following a statement by Refenes that likened the iPhone to a Tiger handheld. McMillen has released a Super Meat Boy microgame for WarioWare D.I.Y. Team Meat sells charms, plush toys, and posters related to the game, as well as T-shirts, stickers, stress balls, and a limited edition Super Meat Boy comic. In 2011, Voxelous released a set of four Super Meat Boy figures of Meat Boy, Bandage Girl, Brownie, and Tofu Boy, later making figures of Commander Video, Jill, Ogmo, and Dr. Fetus.

=== Music ===
Super Meat Boy's soundtrack was composed by Danny Baranowsky, who previously composed the soundtracks for the indie video games Canabalt, Cortex Command, and Gravity Hook. He also composed the music for the original Meat Boy. McMillen knew of Baranowsky's other work, and approached him late in Meat Boy's development, asking him to supply whatever tracks he had on hand. For the soundtrack of Super Meat Boy, Baranowsky incorporated the music he had provided for Meat Boy into an expanded soundtrack. He tried to ensure that the music would accompany the action on the screen without overpowering the sound effects. Baranowsky was given complete freedom for the game's music, and retained all of the rights to it; McMillen believed that being more invested in the game would let Baranowsky express the part of him that was "manic, obsessive, complex, and full of life". McMillen feels that the soundtrack "gets your heart rate up, complements every aspect of its gameplay, and stays with you for days".

On October 26, 2010, the game's soundtrack was released as a download-only album via the online Bandcamp store titled Super Meat Boy! Soundtrack. This release features 34 tracks and a 100-minute runtime, and includes several remixes of tracks from the game. On January 11, 2011, Baranowsky and Team Meat released a special edition soundtrack on Bandcamp as both a downloadable and physical album. This edition includes a second disc of songs not included in the original release, as well as additional remixes. The album, titled Nice to Meat You, has a total of 73 tracks, is 2 hours 25 minutes long, and features album artwork by McMillen. Three music tracks from the game were released as downloadable content for Rock Band 3 in June 2011.

Baranowsky's music was not used for the PlayStation 4, Nintendo Wii U, Nintendo Switch and PlayStation Vita versions, as he "no longer [had] a working relationship with Team Meat" and they could not agree on licensing terms. Instead, those versions of the game feature a soundtrack composed by Ridiculon (Matthias Bossi and Jon Evans), David "Scattle" Scatliffe, and Laura Shigihara, who have previously worked on games such as The Binding of Isaac: Rebirth, Hotline Miami, and Plants vs. Zombies respectively. A soundtrack album for the new music, titled Songs in the Key of Meat: Music from SMB 5th Anniversary, was released on Bandcamp on October 6, 2015. On April 13, 2017, Tommy Refenes introduced the alternative soundtrack on the PC port.

== Reception ==
Reception

Aggregate scores
Aggregator	Score
Metacritic	X360: 90/100; PC: 87/100; PS4: 85/100; VITA: 85/100; WIIU: 83/100; NS: 84/100
OpenCritic	83/100; 96% Critics Recommend

Review scores
Publication	Score
Eurogamer	9/10
Game Informer	9/10
GamesRadar+	9/10
GameTrailers	9.1/10
IGN	9/10
Joystiq	4.5/5
Official Xbox Magazine (UK)	10/10
PC Gamer (UK)	90%
X-Play	5/5

Super Meat Boy received critical acclaim. After being showcased at the Penny Arcade Expo 2010, Super Meat Boy was declared Game of the Show by Destructoid and nominated for the same award by Machinima.com. The game received nominations for the Grand Prize and Excellence in Audio awards at the 2010 Independent Games Festival. It won the award for Most Challenging Game in IGN's Best of 2010 awards, and received nominations for Best Soundtrack and Best Retro Design. It was voted GameSpot's Best Downloadable Console Game of 2010, and won the Best Downloadable Game award from GameTrailers. Sales were strong, with nearly 140,000 units of the Xbox 360 version sold by the end of 2010. The Steam and Xbox 360 versions had sold over 600,000 copies combined by April 2011; 400,000 of these sales were through Steam. On January 3, 2012, Team Meat announced on Twitter that the game had surpassed 1,000,000 sales.

Critics praised Super Meat Boy's platforming elements, and often commented on the game's difficulty. X-Play reviewer Alexandra Hall said the game had "riveting platforming action", and added that "Super Meat Boy's designers are masters of their craft." Henry Gilbert of GamesRadar felt the platforming was "perfect". He wrote that "while it's always tough and demanding, it never feels cheap, or like the game is cheating you." A reviewer from GameTrailers stated that "the difficulty rides the perfect line between driving you utterly bonkers when you fail and making you feel like a platform pro when you succeed". Joystiq's Richard Mitchell echoed other reviewers' comments: "Super Meat Boy is tough, as tough as the toughest nails in the toughest universe." Gilbert cited the level of difficulty, which he believed made the game inaccessible to some players, as his reason for not awarding the game a perfect score. Tom McShea of GameSpot praised the game's "precise control", "excellent level design", and "smooth difficulty curve". Reviewer Tom Bramwell of Eurogamer warned that Super Meat Boy is "a hard game. It should make you want to throw the pad across the room".

Critics gave high marks to the game's retro art direction and presentation. Official Xbox Magazine (UK)'s Mike Channel appreciated the variety found in each set of levels. He stated that "while the graphics may look crude, the presentation is exceptional. Each level has a distinct visual style." Daemon Hatfield, a reviewer for IGN, noted the uniqueness of the game's visual presentation. He commented that the warp zone levels pay tribute to classic 8-bit games, and lauded the game's soundtrack: "The rocking chiptune soundtrack is the best I've heard since Scott Pilgrim vs. The World: The Game". Joe Leonard of 1UP.com noted that the game's humor and over-the-top gameplay help to calm frustrations regarding the difficulty: "Super Meat Boy's greatest strength has to be how it never takes itself too seriously—as maddening as some of the levels got, I could never stay angry at the game for too long", said Leonard. MTV Multiplayer reviewer Russ Frushtick praised the game's visual design. He appreciated the game's cutscenes, which he noted are "hand-drawn animated [shorts] which [bear] more than a passing resemblance to a classic video game intro".

While the game received high praise overall, certain publications voiced complaints. Hatfield noted that the cutscenes had low production values, stating that "they don't have the polish of the rest of the game". The reviewer for PC Gamer mentioned "a few minor, yet-to-be-patched bugs". Eduardo Reboucas of Game Revolution said that "a lot of the levels in Super Meat Boy depend a little too much on twitch reflexes and trial-and-error memorization". He also stated that "there are some bits of toilet humor here and there that are duds", and that the game's high level of difficulty "will make most casual players shy away". Mitchell Dyer of GamePro agreed, saying that certain "absurdly difficult" levels broke the flow of the game, especially in the boss levels and the later chapters.

== Legacy ==
Meat Boy has made cameo appearances in video games such as Bit.Trip Runner, Spelunky, Dust: An Elysian Tail, Ori and the Blind Forest, Retro City Rampage, ilomilo, and Indie Pogo. A parody Flash game, Super Tofu Boy, was released by People for the Ethical Treatment of Animals (PETA) on December 1, 2010, to protest the game and promote veganism. In response, Team Meat added its own interpretation of Tofu Boy to the PC version of the actual Super Meat Boy on December 2, 2010. The game's success spurred the development of the 1930s-style animated indie video game Cuphead, which is also noted for its difficulty.

On August 29, 2014, Team Meat announced that a sequel, Super Meat Boy Forever, was in development for smartphones, tablets, and Steam. The game would remain in development limbo until the project was restarted in 2017, without the assistance of McMillen. In August 2017, the game was confirmed for release for Microsoft Windows, Nintendo Switch, PlayStation 4, Xbox One, iOS and Android systems. The Nintendo Switch and Windows versions were released in December 2020, with PlayStation 4, Xbox One, iOS and Android versions following in 2021.

Edmund McMillen left Team Meat and released the platforming game The End Is Nigh with Tyler Glaiel in 2017, which has been described as a spiritual successor to Super Meat Boy.

A new title, Super Meat Boy 3D, was announced at the Xbox Games Showcase in 2025. The game is co-developed by Team Meat and Sluggerfly and was released on March 31, 2026. A remastered version of Super Meat Boy, Super Meat Boy+, was announced by Team Meat in November 2026 for release on Windows, featuring new levels and improved visual and music assets.
