= Aether (video game) =

2008 video game

- Developers: Edmund McMillen; Tyler Glaiel
- Publisher: Armor Games
- Platform: Adobe Flash
- Release: September 3, 2008
- Genres: Adventure, puzzle
- Mode: Single-player

Aether is a flash game designed by Edmund McMillen and Tyler Glaiel and published by Armor Games, released on September 3, 2008. Players control a lonely boy and an octopus-like monster that the boy encounters, solving puzzles on different planets to restore them from monochrome to color. The pair travel through space by swinging on clouds and asteroids with the monster's elongated tongue, searching other planets for life to which the boy can relate. It is also a part of The Basement Collection.

McMillen and Glaiel created the game and developed it in 14 days. Both developers expressed interest in seeing a version being released on the Wii game console through the WiiWare online service. Aether received a positive response from video game blogs for its unusual visual style and atmosphere. The single looped piece of background music received a mixed response and the controls were highlighted as an area of the game that could have been improved before release.

== Gameplay ==
Aether is a space adventure game with washed-out pastel colors and a varying soundtrack consisting of a piano, synthesizer, guitar, and percussion piece. There are four monochrome planets to explore, which have subdued hues. Players control a lonely boy from Earth and an octopus-like monster he befriends. The monster's tongue is used to propel itself and the boy through space and onto other planets. Each planet has a unique soundtrack that gets louder as you approach it. Each moon or planet exerts gravity over the player character, requiring momentum to escape from the planet's orbit. To escape a planet, the tongue must first be latched onto a cloud floating above the planet's surface, which can then be used to swing the player around. By propelling themselves from the initial cloud using swinging momentum, players can latch onto the next and repeat the process to leave the planet's orbit. After reaching space the process is repeated with stars and asteroids. In space the lack of gravity causes the player to drift until the direction is changed by swinging on another object.

The boy and his monster swing on a crystal hanging from Gravida's interior.

When travelling through space, players are drawn to a planet's orbit once they get close. Each planet's location is labeled with a colored marker which disappears once that planet's puzzle is solved. The player encounters characters who can be helped if a puzzle is solved. Each planet besides Earth has its own puzzle. The monster's ability to swing around objects is used in some of the game's puzzles. One puzzle involves swinging on the crystals which surround the core of a hollow planet called Gravida, without swinging on the same crystal twice or breaking the chain. Solving each planet's puzzle produces a flash of light, after which monochrome planets change to color, subdued pastel colors brighten, and the planet's unique soundtrack becomes permanent.

The game's plot describes a journey through a child's emotions and anxieties. After befriending the monster, the boy leaves Earth on the creature's back to look for life elsewhere in the galaxy. He hopes to find someone to relate to. The hollow planet Gravida's surface is patrolled by a creature that complains of stomach pains. This larger creature is followed by several tiny creatures, some of which ride on its back. One of these smaller inhabitants has fallen into the core of Gravida. Though it is isolated and lonely, the creature consoles itself that nobody can harm it. The planet Malaisus is composed of water, with a monster identical to the player's swimming around with a shoal of fish. The monster tells the player to leave. Planet Bibulon has two faces on opposite sides, one angry and one happy. A two-faced creature travels across the surface; one is happy and the other morose. Bibulon is orbited by four moons, each of which has differing opinions on an unnamed man or boy. When players find the planet Debasa, they discover that it is surrounded by a green fog. Gravity is very intense within the fog. Four orbiting satellites produce the fog, which has trapped two boys. Earth shrinks slightly after each planet has been completed. After restoring color to all the surrounding planets, the game is completed by returning to Earth. The Earth has shrunk until it is only slightly larger than the monster; it is destroyed when the boy and his monster land. Both fly upwards and land on the moon, where the boy is free to craft a future of his choosing.

== Development ==
Aether was created by Edmund McMillen and Tyler Glaiel, McMillen was a member of independent development studio Cryptic Sea and co-creator of the award-winning Gish. Glaiel runs his own independent studio, Glaiel Games, and develops Flash games for game and animation website Newgrounds. The game's graphics and story were created by McMillen, while Glaiel wrote the game's music and code. The game was developed in 14 days; McMillen found he could "ride off" Glaiel's inspiration and allowed the project to be completed quickly. "People being creative and taking risks with their work always is inspiring to me, honesty in art is also very inspiring," he stated.

McMillen's childhood experiences and fears were used for the game's themes of loneliness, nervousness, and fear of abandonment or rejection. The boy's journeys through space represent inward-thinking and imagination, planets represent fears and the inhabitants personify McMillen's childhood "inner demons". He was initially unsure as to whether or not he wished to release Aether, since it was based on personal experiences and made him feel vulnerable. Glaiel created the game's planets and gameplay, designing the layout of the planets to convey the emotions involved in the game, but he did not know which planets would ultimately be used to relate to each emotion. He felt that the game's sense of emotion and mood was improved because development was not thoroughly planned from the outset. Both developers expressed a wish to port the game to the WiiWare service on the Wii video game console. Aether was released as part of McMillen's game and comic compilation CD This is a Cry For Help in early November 2008.

== Reception ==
The game was positively received by gaming blogs, though reviewers held mixed opinions about the controls. The story was compared to The Little Prince, Antoine de Saint-Exupéry's 1943 novella. Aether's graphics were praised by reviewers. Alec Meer of website Rock Paper Shotgun described them as "beautiful to look at", Justin McElroy of Joystiq said the game has a "unique visual style" and described the pastel shades as attractive, and Peter Cohen of Macworld described them as a unique look composed of "cute characters with sometimes grotesque imagery". Meer also enjoyed the game but found the looped piano music irritating. Nate Ralph of Wired found the game "hauntingly beautiful, if short".

Reviewers noted that the solution to some of the puzzles were unclear, further hindered by the planets' inhabitants, whose dialogue does not change when the planet's puzzle is completed. Meer enjoyed the spacefaring aspect of the game, and Derek Yu of the indie games forum TIGSource stated the controls "sometimes felt brilliant, at other times felt unresponsive and awkward." Patrick Dugan of Play This Thing saw potential in the tongue-swinging gameplay, noting that Aether appeared to be the first of a series. He suggested that more spatial elements, such as nebulae and black holes, would have made space flight more interesting. McMillen described Aether as "just the prelude to a larger experience", while Yu suggested that a larger game with improved controls "could be something better than great".

Aether received an Honorable Mention at IndieCade in 2009.
