= Offspring Fling =

2012 video game

- Steam banner art
- Developer: Kyle Pulver
- Engine: FlashPunk
- Platforms: Windows, Mac OS, Linux
- Release: WW: March 30, 2012
- Genre: Puzzle-platform
- Mode: Single-player

Offspring Fling (stylized as Offspring Fling!) is puzzle-platform game developed by Kyle Pulver and released on March 30, 2012 for Microsoft Windows, Mac OS, and Linux. The game was received favorably by various critics.

== Gameplay ==
Offspring Fling is a 2D sidescrolling puzzle-platform game. The player controls a rodent-like forest creature, whose children have been lost. The goal in each level is to gather all the children and bring them to the exit.

While carrying one or more children, the player will not fit through small openings and their jump height is decreased. The player can throw the children in a straight line to move them across the level, which is where the game's name comes from.

== Development ==
Offspring Fling began as a side-project by Tempe, Arizona-based developer Kyle Pulver that turned into a full game. The game contains 100 campaign puzzles, a time trial mechanic, and 20 unlockable bonus levels focusing on precise platforming.

== Reception ==
Offspring Fling received positive reviews from critics upon release. On Metacritic, the game holds a score of 79/100 based on 4 reviews, indicating "generally favorable reviews".
