= Gish (video game) =

2004 platform video game

- Developer: Chronic Logic
- Publisher: Chronic Logic
- Designers: Edmund McMillen; Alex Austin; Josiah Pisciotta
- Programmers: Alex Austin; Josiah Pisciotta
- Artist: Edmund McMillen
- Writer: Dave Strock
- Composer: Game Audio Magic
- Platforms: Microsoft Windows, Linux, Mac OS X
- Release: Microsoft Windows; May 4, 2004; Linux, macOS; August 2, 2004
- Genre: Platform
- Modes: Single-player, multiplayer

Gish is a 2004 platform game developed and published by Chronic Logic. After eight months in development, it was released in May 2004 to a positive reception. A sequel, Gish 2, was canceled. The game became open-source software in May 2010 and received a 15th-anniversary update in January 2020.

== Gameplay ==
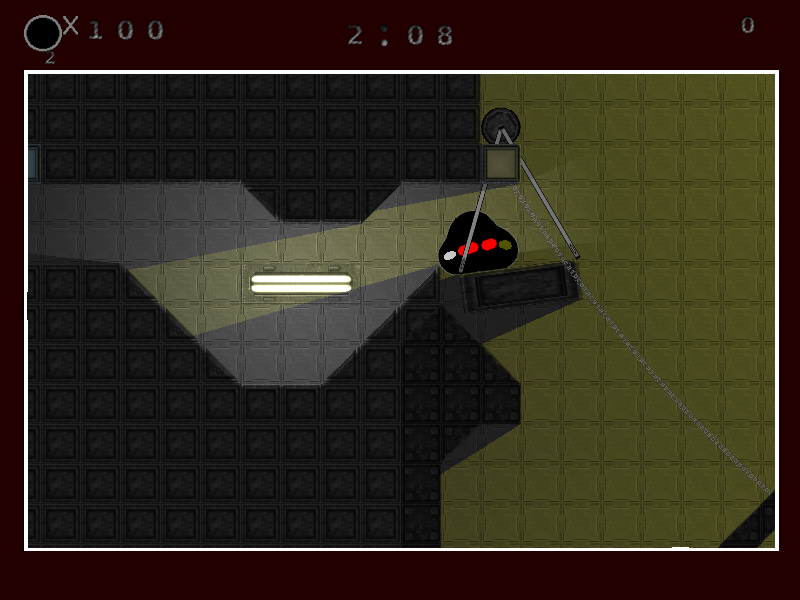
A screenshot of FreeGish, a fork of Gish

Gish is a physics-based platform game. The player controls Gish, a ball of tar. Besides movement, Gish has four abilities: becoming sticky, slick, solid, and jumping/expanding. When sticky he can climb up walls, stick to ceilings, and plant himself firmly to a solid object. Becoming slick makes Gish slippery and frictionless, letting him slide down pipes and squeeze out of being crushed at the same time getting under objects. Being in solid state turns Gish's body into a rigid weight, allowing him to push any object he might have squeezed under, fall faster, squash enemies, smash breakable platforms, sink in water, and resist being run over. To jump, Gish must first compress his body, then expand to launch himself into the air. Gish's abilities can be combined for use in certain situations - for instance, while both sticky and slick he can climb walls without grabbing loose objects, and while slick and solid he can slide downhill at high speed.

== Plot ==
Gish is a ball of tar who lives happily with his human girlfriend Brea, until one day a mysterious dark creature kidnaps her. Gish fights through several levels of enemies in the sewers of Dross until the final boss appears: Hera, Gish's former classmate who has an unrequited affection towards Gish. Gish rejects her, and Hera threatens to drop Brea into a pool of lava. After Gish defeats Hera, he must rescue Brea. If the player succeeds, Brea and Gish escape and become famous entomologists, as well as the world's first legal inter-species marriage. If the player fails, Brea burns to death in the lava pit and Gish goes on to live a life of celibacy, "volunteering most of his time to charity organizations that specialize in bringing lava awareness to the mainstream." In the latter case, Brea's picture is crossed out from the final group photo of the game.

== Development and release ==
Gish was developed by Chronic Logic—an indie game studio based in Santa Cruz, California, and founded in 2001—without external funding. The game was the idea of Edmund McMillen, Chronic Logic's artist and designer, as the company was looking for a new game concept that used the physics from its previous puzzle video game, Triptych. Alex Austin, the lead programmer, was initially against the idea until McMillen convinced him of the concept. Over a longer time period, the developers were able to test out several concepts. They came up with further ideas and discarded those that did not work, such as the original plan of giving Gish an arm to swing with.

The development process was split into two halves. The first focused on the physics and issues with collision detection. Austin used the MS-DOS Editor to write the source code, compiling it with Visual C++. The second half covered "everything else", including the level design, which was changed multiple times, and a level editor. They were driven by the "make it fun" principle of games like Super Mario Bros. and Pitfall!, which they played during the production. Using Adobe Photoshop and Macromedia Flash, McMillen designed original characters, including 36 enemies, which later had to be reduced to 16 due to time constraints. Austin also cited self-imposed crunch time as an issue during development. The total development time was eight months. Gish was released for Microsoft Windows on May 4, 2004, and ported to Linux and Mac OS X on August 2, 2004.

Music and sound effects of the game were created by Tim Smolens and Jeff Attridge of Game Audio Magic. It features remixes of songs by Smolens's band Estradasphere.

Chronic Logic disbanded shortly after Gish's release, which cost the game potential publishing deals, McMillen later joined Austin at his new venture, Cryptic Sea. Another Mac OS X version, compatible with all variants of the operating system, was released by Cryptic Sea in December 2007. Reflexive Entertainment distributed the game through its online game portal, Reflexive Arcade, starting in 2006. Gish Mobile, a version for J2ME, was developed by Hardwire and Erphenic Studios, published by Pixalon Studios, and distributed by GlobalFun.

A sequel, Gish 2, was in development "for a couple months" at Cryptic Sea by November 2007. McMillen proposed Gish 2 to Microsoft in 2008 before developing Super Meat Boy instead. Gish 2 was formally put on hold in late 2008 for Cryptic Sea to focus on its other release, No Quarter. Austin released the Gish source code under GNU GPL-2.0-or-later in May 2010. In the same month, Gish became part of the first Humble Indie Bundle. It further appeared in the Humble Voxatron Debut in November 2011. In January 2020, celebrating the game's 15th anniversary, Austin and McMillen released an update for Gish with several quality-of-life improvements. Newgrounds user Tarhead designed the cover art for this version.

== Reception ==
Gish received "generally favorable reviews", according to Metacritic. At the 2005 Independent Games Festival, Gish won the "Innovation in Game Design" award, as well as the Seumas McNally Grand Prize and its US$20,000 prize money. McMillen used his acceptance speech for the latter to propose to his girlfriend, Danielle. Gish also won Computer Games Magazine's 2004 "Best Independent Game" award. The revenue from Gish kept Austin afloat for several years.
