= The Legend of Bum-bo =

2019 indie roguelike deck-building puzzle video game

- Developers: Edmund McMillen; James Interactive
- Publishers: Edmund McMillen; The Label (Android); Nicalis
- Composer: Ridiculon
- Engine: Unity
- Platforms: Windows; Android; Nintendo Switch; PlayStation 5; Xbox Series X/S
- Release: Microsoft Windows; November 12, 2019; Android; December 7, 2020; Switch, PS5, Xbox Series X/S; June 29, 2022
- Genres: Roguelike deck-building, puzzle
- Mode: Single-player

The Legend of Bum-bo is a 2019 roguelike deck-building game developed by designer Edmund McMillen and programmer James Interactive. The game was released for Microsoft Windows via Steam in November 2019 and Android by The Label in December 2020, and for Nintendo Switch, PlayStation 5, Xbox Series X/S by Nicalis in June 2022. The game is a prequel to McMillen's previous roguelike video game The Binding of Isaac.

== Gameplay ==
The Legend of Bum-bo combines gameplay elements from multiple different video game genres. The player takes turns matching tiles on a board in order to cast spells, improve their defense, and attack the various enemies of the game.

The Legend of Bum-bo melds together gameplay elements from several different video game genres. The player controls Bum-bo or other unlockable characters as they progress through the various levels of the game; each character varies in their starting attributes, such as health, speed, luck, and so on. There are a total of 4 levels, each made up of multiple rooms filled with various enemies that the player must defeat, and a boss fight at the end of each level. In order to defeat the enemies and bosses, the player must match tiles on a board (similar to games such as Bejeweled and Candy Crush Saga) in order to cast spells, improve their defense, and attack. The game is turn-based; the player has a specific number of turns to strategically match tiles before the enemy can move their position and attack, but there are spells and items that allow the player to extend the amount of turns they have. Like most roguelikes, the tiles, rooms and enemy layouts are randomly generated, ensuring no two runs of the game will be the same.

Upon clearing a room of enemies, players are given the choice of one of two items that they can use for the rest of the run. When the player defeats the level's boss, they are taken to a transitional area between levels where they can play a number of minigames using the coins they obtained from defeating enemies. These minigames include a wheel that can be spun to increase a given attribute, and a shell game that players can play to earn an item. There is also a shop where players can purchase items for coins directly. Graphically, the game has a cardboard aesthetic, making it seem as if the player is inside a cardboard box.

== Plot ==
The game centers around Bum-bo, a homeless man that happily lives in a box behind a house on a hill with his trash and his money. Bum-bo hears a voice from above from someone which steals his money and disappears down a hole. Bum-bo grabs his trash and jumps down the hole, fighting through hordes of enemies and bosses in pursuit of his money.

The game has multiple endings; each one reveals more of the story: Bum-bo finds several treasure chests containing Bum-bos unlike himself (unlocking them as additional characters); he eventually finds a trap door and enters it. After clearing the enemies and boss inside, Bum-bo finally retrieves his money, but hears something mean and huge.

The narration is suddenly interrupted by a woman's voice asking Isaac who he is talking to; the game zooms out of the cardboard box setting to show a child's room, revealing that the world of Bum-bo was a fictional creation that Isaac had been playing in, created by Isaac's father. Isaac's mother berates Isaac for playing the game, repeatedly stating that Isaac's father had left them and that it was just the two of them. The game's epilogue is a flashback from when Isaac's father was still around and the two of them were playing Bum-bo; his father narrates the ending of their game in which a slot machine appears and Bum-bo gambles his money.

Depending on the performance of the player's run, two outcomes occur. If Bum-Bo loses, he hangs himself. If Bum-bo wins, he gets rich and rules over his kingdom. Isaac's father explains that the world of Bum-bo will continue to grow and grow, and will always be there for Isaac as a way to escape from the real world.

== Development and release ==
The Legend of Bum-bo was developed by designer Edmund McMillen and programmer James Interactive. Described by McMillen as his "biggest project" with the "most difficult design cycle", the game was in development for four years and created without a prototype. When the game launched it briefly had softlocks that created backlash on Steam. Due to personal issues, James Interactive did not proceed with fixing bugs and updating the game with new content. In November 2020, McMillen announced that he had recruited The Binding of Isaac: Rebirth programmers Simon Parzer and Adrian Gavrilita to fulfill programming tasks and that further development would be moving forward, with a free downloadable content pack anticipated to be released in 2021. The Label Limited ported over and released the game for Android on December 7, 2020. On February 4, 2022, publisher Nicalis released The Legend of Bum-bo on the Epic Games Store and GOG.com. Nicalis released the game for Nintendo Switch, PlayStation 5 and Xbox Series X and Series S on June 29, 2022.

== Reception ==
Reception

Aggregate score
Aggregator	Score
Metacritic	PC: 73/100

Review score
Publication	Score
PC Gamer (US)	72/100

The Legend of Bum-bo received mixed reviews. In a review for PC Gamer, Rachel Watts comments: "It's a fun twist on the traditional turn-based roguelike, though it's a little frayed around its cardboard edges. [...] It's frustrating that The Legend of Bum-Bo asks me to think ahead, but doesn't reward me for planning further than the box I'm currently in. [...] It's a smaller game than its predecessor but it feels more focused, with combat that offers a distinctive spin on turn-based strategy."
