= Tommy Refenes =

American video game programmer

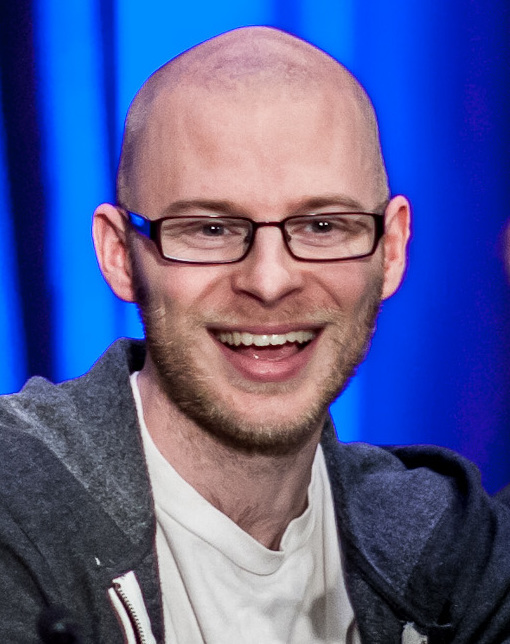
- Refenes at the 2012 Game Developers Conference
- Born: June 14, 1981 (age 45); Hendersonville, North Carolina
- Occupations: Video game designer, programmer CEO of Team Meat
- Known for: Super Meat Boy

Tommy Refenes is an American video game designer and programmer, best known for his work on the game Super Meat Boy, a platformer he co-created with designer Edmund McMillen.

== Early life ==
Refenes began programming at the age of eleven, and has been doing so professionally since the age of 18, initially contracting for a website whose owner had threatened to sue him over a parody Flash game he had made. He dropped out of North Carolina State University; he later told gaming blog Brutal Gamer "if you want to be a programmer, do not go to college." He is also Type 1 Diabetic, as revealed in Indie Game: The Movie.

== Career ==
Refenes started at Seventy - Two DPI in August 2001 where he managed their website and servers. In August 2003 he was hired by Learning Station, where he developed server software and applications in Flash, C++, PHP, and ASP. In July 2005 he decided to shift to the computer game field and went to work for Streamline Studios, where he assisted in optimizing and porting the Unreal 2.x engine from the original Xbox to the Xbox 360, In May 2006, Refenes and Aubrey Hesselgren, a game designer, founded the company Pillowfort. Their first effort was a game they dubbed Goo!. In 2008 Goo! won the grand prize for Best Threaded Game in the 2008 Intel Game Demo Contest, and took third place for Best Game on Intel Graphics. The game was canceled and Refenes left the studio in January 2009.

In 2009 he co-founded the company Team Meat with game and graphics designer Edmund McMillen, with Refenes acting as programmer and co-CEO. Super Meat Boy is the only game they have published together as McMillen left Team Meat in 2017, and they are not expected to work on more projects together. Though Team Meat did release Super Meat Boy Forever in 2020 with Refenes as a designer and lead programmer, McMillen was not involved and later stated that he would not return to the series.

=== Apple App Store controversy ===
In March 2010 at the Game Developers Conference 2010, Refenes criticized Apple's App Store, calling it "awful" and "horrible" and likened its games to the crude Tiger Electronics games that were popular in the 1980s and 1990s. Seven days after this speech was given, Apple pulled the game Zits & Giggles from the market. Refenes had developed the game and sold it through the App Store in order to satirize what he considered to be the nonsensical nature of the App Store. In response to its removal he and McMillen launched the Super Meat Boy Handheld on the App Store. The game adopted the art style and gameplay of the Tiger handheld series of games. As Refenes described it, "Super Meat Boy Handheld is all the branding of Super Meat Boy, without the actual gameplay or art from Super Meat Boy...and all for ONLY A DOLLAR."

== Games ==
Title	Platform(s)	Release year	Notes
nail jesus to the cross!!	Flash	2000	
Bitch Hunt	Flash	2000	
Owl Country	Mac OS X, Microsoft Windows	2008	Voice Work, voices the owl
Grey Matter	Flash	2008	
Beat! Music Memory Match	iOS	2009	
Free Money* Scratch n'Win	iOS	2009	
Zits & Giggles	iOS	2009	
Goo	N/A	2009	Cancelled
Super Meat Boy HANDHELD!	iOS	2010	
Super Meat Boy	Linux, Mac OS X, Microsoft Windows, PlayStation 4, PlayStation Vita, Xbox Live Arcade	2010	
Super Meat Boy Forever	Epic Games Store, Steam, Nintendo Switch, Xbox One, PlayStation 4	2020	
Dr. Fetus' Mean Meat Machine	Steam, Epic Games Store, Nintendo Switch, Xbox One, Xbox Series X/S, PlayStation 5, PlayStation 4	2023	
