= Florian Himsl =

Austrian game developer and programmer

- Occupation: Game designer
- Website: https://komix-games.com/

Florian Himsl is an Austrian game developer, programmer and YouTuber, best known for his work together with artist and designer Edmund McMillen, first and foremost the best-selling roguelike The Binding of Isaac but also the game Coil, which was nominated for the Innovation Award at the 2009 Independent Games Festival. He has also made games under the name Komix Games.

Florian is also known for his YouTube channel Himsl Games, his most recognized video series being Binding of Isaac: Explained!.

In 2022, Himsl released the game Ballfrog to mostly positive reviews.

Florian regularly appears on the podcast Is It Kino?. He is known for often expressing opinions that are contrarian to those of the other hosts, usually to their chagrin.

On March 12, 2023, Florian made the Anti Reviews channel, where he posts "bi-weekly videos that may or may not be reviews".
