= I am Error =

Quote from Zelda II: The Adventure of Link

The original usage of the phrase in Zelda II: The Adventure of Link

"I am Error" is a quote from the NES game Zelda II: The Adventure of Link. The quote is spoken by a villager, apparently named Error, in the town of Ruto. In the original Japanese version of the game, the line is Ore no na wa Erā da… (オレノナハ エラー ダ…), which translates to "My name is Error…".

The unlikely character name is widely believed to have been a programmer's in-joke, since the game also features a similar looking character named Bagu (バグ; lit. Bug), meaning software bug. In computing, a bug is a flaw in the programming code that might lead to an error. Error and Bug are thus assumed to form a comical, in-universe parallel. In the English version, the name Erā was translated, but the name Bagu was not. Many gamers therefore missed the joke and variously believed the "I am Error" phrase to be a mistranslation, a misspelling, or an actual error message.

The phrase has since become part of the NES folklore and became an early Internet meme around 2000. It has been referenced in a number of games, including Super Paper Mario, The Binding of Isaac, Guacamelee!, Pony Island, and Terraria.

== Origin ==
Zelda II: The Adventure of Link was released in Japan on 14 January 1987, and internationally in late 1988. The player controls Link, who travels through Hyrule in his quest to rescue Princess Zelda. Early in the game, Link arrives in the town of Ruto, where he can enter a house inhabited by a bearded man in purple attire. If the player approaches him, he announces: "I am Error".

Many puzzled gamers believed the cryptic phrase to be a textual mistake or a glitch within the game, but it is actually neither. The line is a correct English translation of the original Japanese text Ore no na wa Erā da… (オレノナハ エラー ダ…), of which a more precise translation would be "My name is Error…". (Note: Due to space considerations, the original Japanese version of this line was rendered in single-byte katakana rather than double-byte Shift JIS characters as would be expected for standard Japanese writing.) Initially, the character does not say anything else. When the player advances to the harbor town of Mido, a man there advises Link to "Ask Error of Ruto about the Palace". If the player then goes back to Error, he provides Link with a clue about how to gain access to the Island Palace, the game's third dungeon.

While no official explanation from Nintendo exists regarding the origin of the Erā/Error character, his name is widely believed to have been an in-joke from the game's programmers. Aside from Error, the game also features a character named Bagu (バグ), meaning "[software] bug". In computing, a bug is an error in the programming code, leading to unintended results. Bagu/Bug lives near Error, residing in a house hidden in a forest south of Ruto. The two characters look identical, except that Error wears a purple tunic, while Bug's tunic is red. It is therefore assumed that one of the developers named one character Error and another one Bug, having the two men form a humorous thematic connection within the game's universe. When the game was translated to English, the name Erā was correctly translated to Error, but the name Bagu was not translated to Bug, leading Official Nintendo Magazine to conclude: "In reality, then, Bagu is the mistake, because his name was translated wrongly and should have been Bug. So there".

Translator Clyde Mandelin wrote that the "I am Error" quote is often incorrectly believed to be a translation mistake, and is even considered "one of the biggest mistranslations of early Nintendo games", even though it is not actually a mistranslation. Another incorrect notion about Error is that his name is a typo and should have been Errol. The original Japanese text proves this wrong though. The reason for the phrase often being considered a translation or spelling mistake is likely because many early games from the 1980s and 90s, including the first Zelda game, were rife with mistranslations and poor English prose ('Engrish'). A well-known example of this is "All your base are belong to us" from Zero Wing (1989).

== Legacy ==
Around 2000, "I am Error" became an early Internet meme. According to Ben Huh, founder of Cheezburger Inc., the meme was inspired by the success of the "All your base are belong to us" meme, which inspired a number of memes based on 'Engrish' quotes from old games, such as "A Winner is You" (from the NES game Pro Wrestling). The "All your base" joke is believed to have sprung up in 1998 and surged in popularity in 2000–2001, giving some indication of when the "I am Error" meme must have originated.

Despite being a minor NPC, Error has become part of the wider NES folklore and has been mentioned in several pieces of media. For example, VideoGamer.com's Emily Gera included him in a list of the "oddest character names in games", describing him as "[p]ossibly one of the most well known minor characters of all time". GamesRadar+ included his phrase in a list of the 40 most repeated quotes. GameSpot mentioned the phrase in an article discussing poor translation in video games, incorrectly calling it a 'translation oddity'. IGN included it in their list of the worst in-game quotes at number two. The editor joked that the 'mystery' of Error "ranked up with Sasquatch and the Loch Ness Monster". The Escapist's Brett Staebell called Error a "pioneer in game humorology", and used the quote as the subtitle for his article. A Nintendo Life review for Castlevania II: Simon's Quest noted that the game had a script similar to that of "I am Error", likening the game's garbled translation to the phrase.

From approximately 2012 to 2015, the 404 page of nintendo.co.uk stated "I am Error", along with a picture of the character. At E3 2014, the Nintendo Treehouse's presentation of Super Smash Bros. for Wii U displayed an error page based on the "I am Error" scene after experiencing technical difficulties.

Nathan Altice wrote a book titled I Am Error, named after the character, which gives a technical history of the NES, focusing especially on the console's technical limitations and how they influenced its games. It was published in May 2015 by MIT Press.

On day 2 of the Nintendo Treehouse presentation at E3 2019, an "I am Error" technical difficulties screen was shown after the Treehouse was hit by a brief power outage within the South-Hall.

A Nintendocore band named iamerror existed from 2005 to 2009.

=== Appearances in other video games ===
Super Paper Mario (2007) features a boss battle against a character named Fracktail, a robotic dragon. It is at one point hacked, which causes it to utter several confused lines, including "I am Error. Press any key to restart". An achievement in Guacamelee! (2013) was given the title "I Am Error". Zeno Clash II (2013) also features it as an achievement title. The quote is featured in Fossil Fighters: Champions (2010). Video game designer Edmund McMillen put references to the quote in two of his games: Time Fcuk and The Binding of Isaac. In Splatoon 2 (2017), Pearl says "I am Error" when her Team Retro loses the Splatfest to Marina's Team Modern. In Cadence of Hyrule (2019), if the player finds a way to go out of bounds, they encounter a character in a house who says "I am Error". Talking to him again has him call himself "Error Houlihan", a reference to the Chris Houlihan room.

== See also ==
- "It's dangerous to go alone!", a quote from The Legend of Zelda (1986)
- "Our princess is in another castle!", a quote from Super Mario Bros. (1985)
