= Ghost Brigade (disambiguation) =

Ghost Brigade is a 1993 American supernatural horror film.

Ghost Brigade may also refer to:

== Arts and entertainment ==
- Ghost Brigade, a 1993 American supernatural horror film
- Ghost Brigade (band)
- The Ghost Brigades, a 2006 science fiction novel
- Ghost Brigade (song), a 2022 song by the rock band Creeper

== Military ==
- 1st Stryker Brigade Combat Team (SBCT) referred to as the Ghost Brigade
- 9th Special Forces Brigade referred to as the Ghost Brigade
- Prizrak Brigade referred to as the Ghost Brigade
- 3rd Brigade, 3rd Infantry Division referred to as the Phantom Brigade

== See also ==
- Phantom Brigade, a 2020 video game
- The Trenchcoat Brigade, a comic book series published in 1999
