= Danny Baranowsky =

American electronic music composer

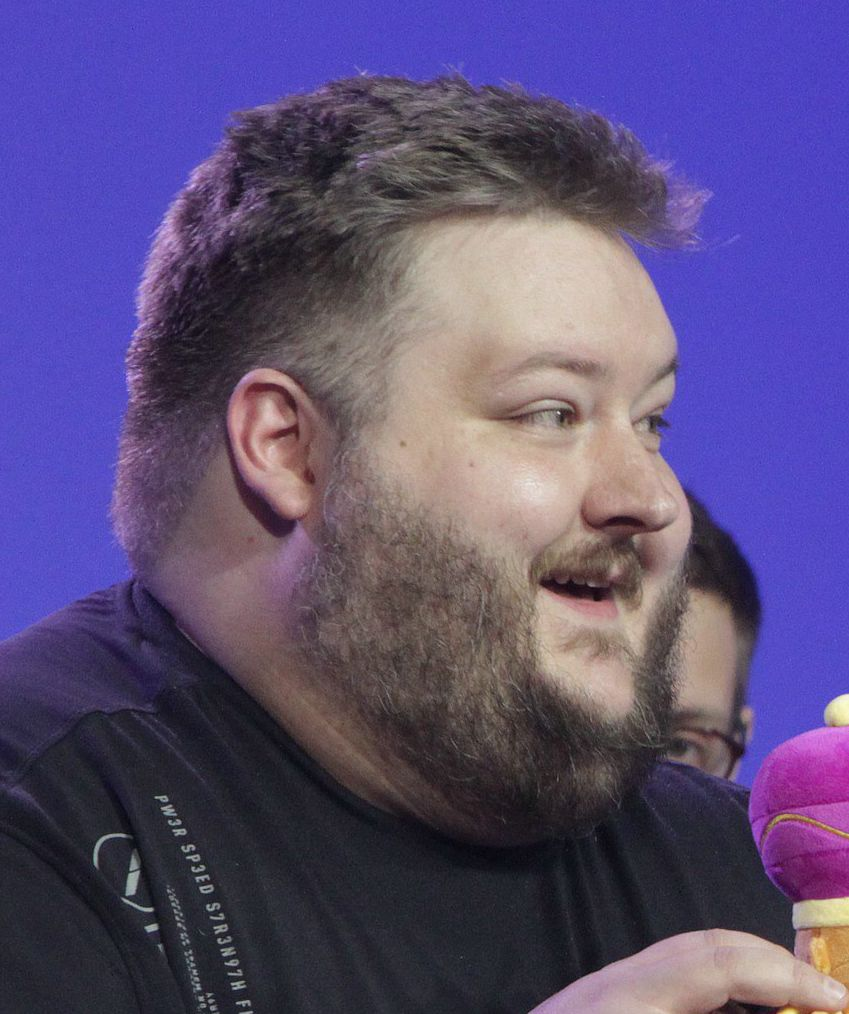
- Baranowsky at the 2016 Game Developers Choice Awards

Background information
- Also known as: Danny B; dB Soundworks; Count Funkula; SysteManiac
- Born: Daniel Baranowsky; April 5, 1984 (age 42); Mesa, Arizona, U.S.
- Genres: Electronic; video game
- Occupations: Composer; musician
- Instrument: Digital audio workstation
- Years active: 2001–present
- Website: dbsoundworks.com

Danny Baranowsky (born April 5, 1984), also known as Danny B or by the company name dB Soundworks, is an American electronic music composer, composing music mainly for indie films and indie games. He founded dB Soundworks to sell and promote his music. He is most known for providing the music for games such as Canabalt, Super Meat Boy, The Binding of Isaac, and Crypt of the NecroDancer. Baranowsky has also contributed to the soundtrack of the 2016 Amplitude remake.

== Career ==
Baranowsky first came into contact with video game music in 2001, when he became a member of online game remix community OverClocked ReMix. At this time, Baranowsky was hoping to become a film composer.

When Adam Saltsman, who would later develop Canabalt, sent Baranowsky an incomplete version of Gravity Hook, which Saltsman intended to keep free of music, Baranowsky decided to write a track for it anyway. When Baranowsky sent "Track A" back to Saltsman, he was really impressed by the music. After finishing the soundtrack of Gravity Hook, Saltsman introduced Baranowsky to Edmund McMillen, for whom he later composed the soundtrack of Super Meat Boy and The Binding of Isaac.

He co-composed Desktop Dungeons with Grant Kirkhope and composed the entirety of the Crypt of the Necrodancer soundtrack.

Baranowsky moved from his native Arizona to Vancouver, British Columbia to work for independent developer Brace Yourself Games, composing the soundtracks of their games Industries of Titan and Cadence of Hyrule.

== Reception ==
Rory Young from Game Rant described Baranowsky as "amazingly talented" because of his work on Super Meat Boy.

== Discography ==
=== Albums ===
Title	Album details
dannyBsides	Released: December 1, 2017; Label: None (self-released); Formats: Digital download

=== Soundtracks ===
Year	Name	Type	Notes	Ref.
2009	Cortex Command	Video Game		
2010	Canabalt	Video game		
2010	Gravity Hook HD	Video game		
2010	Gravity Hook	Video game		
2010	Once Upon A Pixel – KOOPA	Web series		
2010	GLORG	Video game		
2010	Super Meat Boy	Video game		
2010	Das Cube	Video game		
2010	Hey Ash, Whatcha Playin'? (Season 2 Finale)	Web series		
2010	Steambirds	Video game		
2010	Anthony Saves the World	Web series		
2010	Blush	Video game		
2010	Time Donkey	Video game		
2011	Friday (Lost NES Game Version)	Video game		
2011	Singularity Collapse	Short film		
2011	The Binding of Isaac	Video game		
2011	Cave Story 3D/Cave Story+	Video game		
2011	Super Meat Boy (Special Edition)	Video game		
2012	Parallax	Short film		
2012	AVGM (Blooba Doop Scooba)	Video game		
2013	The Adventures of Dash	Video game		
2013	Desktop Dungeons	Video game	In collaboration with Grant Kirkhope.	
2013	Soundodger	Video game		
2015	Crypt of the NecroDancer	Video game		
2016	Rocky	Video game		
2016	Amplitude	Video game	Composed track "Crypteque (1-2)"	
2017	Bombernauts	Video game		
2017	Crypt of the NecroDancer: AMPLIFIED	Video game	DLC content from the game.	
2019	Cadence of Hyrule	Video game		
2023	Industries of Titan	Video game		
2025	Rift of the NecroDancer			
