= Rift of the NecroDancer =

2025 video game

- Developers: Brace Yourself Games; Tic Toc Games
- Publisher: Klei Entertainment
- Composers: Danny Baranowsky; Alex Moukala; Jules Conroy (FamilyJules); Josie Brechner; Sam Webster; Nick Nausbaum
- Engine: Unity
- Platforms: Windows; Nintendo Switch
- Release: Windows; February 5, 2025; Nintendo Switch; March 27, 2025
- Genre: Rhythm
- Mode: Single-player

Rift of the NecroDancer is a 2025 rhythm game developed by Brace Yourself Games and Tic Toc Games, and published by Klei Entertainment. A spin-off of Brace Yourself Games' previous title Crypt of the NecroDancer, it features the player pressing buttons corresponding to 3 lanes as enemies with different behaviors approach the bottom of the screen.

The game was released on February 5, 2025, for Windows and elicited positive reviews. It was later released for Nintendo Switch on March 27, 2025. The game has received various downloadable content since its release, collaborating with other intellectual properties such as Celeste, Pizza Tower, Hatsune Miku and Friday Night Funkin'.

== Gameplay ==
Gameplay screenshot, featuring characters Cadence and Merlin from left to right. Directional button prompts are located at the bottom of three respective lanes that house various hostile enemies, which must be defeated in time with music.

Rift of the NecroDancer is a rhythm game that has the player press specific buttons in time with the music. The player controls Cadence, the returning protagonist from Crypt of the NecroDancer, as she progresses through a series of stages in three different game modes.

In the main game mode "rhythm rift" enemies advance towards Cadence down three lanes, and the player must press the corresponding button for each lane when an enemy reaches the front. Different enemy types have different behaviors such as moving between lanes, or requiring multiple button presses to defeat. If the player fails to defeat an enemy, Cadence will lose health, and the stage is failed if her health reaches zero. The player can collect food items during stages which restores some of Cadence's lost health. In boss battle stages, the player must press buttons at the correct time to avoid attacks from the boss, and then counterattack until the boss is defeated. The game also contains minigame stages heavily inspired by Rhythm Heaven. Like the other modes, the player must press buttons in time with the music, but each mini game has a different setting and rules, such as Cadence needing to pose at the correct time during a yoga class.

The game's story mode has players progress through stages in a linear order, with story cutscenes in-between gameplay sections. Players can alternatively select individual stages from the menu and choose to play on one of four difficulty levels. There is also a practice mode where players can practice stages without a failure state. Rhythm rift stages also have a remix mode, where enemy types and positions are shuffled for a different experience each time. Every day, there is daily challenge where players can compete for a high score by playing the same remixed stage. The game also allows players to create custom stages using outside music, and share their creations with other players via Steam Workshop.

== Development ==
Rift of the NecroDancer was first revealed on August 4, 2022, alongside a trailer for the Crypt of the NecroDancer: Synchrony DLC. A gameplay trailer announcing a Windows release was later posted on August 24, 2022. A Nintendo Switch version was also confirmed during the April 2023 Nintendo Indie World Showcase targeting a 2023 release date. One month later Brace Yourself Games laid off 50% of its staff, but confirmed that development of Rift of the NecroDancer would continue. In August 2023, Brace Yourself Games announced the game would be delayed to 2024 and also be published by Klei Entertainment. In November 2024, the release was delayed again, with the Windows version releasing on February 5, 2025. The Nintendo Switch version would release a month later on March 27, 2025, after the Nintendo Direct on the same day.

The game has received various free and paid updates utilizing characters and music from other intellectual properties.

List of post release updates
Title	Release date	Notes	Ref.
Super Meat Boy	February 12, 2025	Free update	
Celeste	March 27, 2025	Paid music pack with one free song	
Crypt of the NecroDancer (wave 1)	April 23, 2025	Free update celebrating Crypt's anniversary	
Pizza Tower	May 5, 2025	Paid music pack	
Hatsune Miku	June 12, 2025	Paid music pack with one free song	
Hololive	June 25, 2025	Paid music pack with one free song	
Everhood	August 13, 2025	Paid music pack with one free song	
Monstercat	September 18, 2025	Paid music pack	
Shovel Knight	October 30, 2025	Paid music pack with one free song	
Unbeatable	December 10, 2025	Free update	
Friday Night Funkin'	December 10, 2025	Paid music pack with one free song	
Crypt of the NecroDancer (wave 2)	February 5, 2026 (Note: Announced as part of the same celebration, but released separately)	Free updates celebrating Rift's anniversary	
Crypt of the NecroDancer (wave 2)	February 19, 2026	Free updates celebrating Rift's anniversary	
VA-11 Hall-A	March 11, 2026	Paid music pack with one free song	
Spin Rhythm XD	March 11, 2026	Free update	
Undertale	April 9, 2026	Paid music pack with one free song	
Rift of the NecroDancer Vol. 2	June 11, 2026	Paid music pack with one free song	
K/DA	June 25, 2026	Paid music pack	

Other than collaborations with other intellectual properties, the game received an update in October 2025 to add profile customization and unlockables.

== Reception ==
Reception

Aggregate scores
Aggregator	Score
Metacritic	PC: 79/100
OpenCritic	88% recommend

Review scores
Publication	Score
Digital Trends	4/5 stars
IGN	8/10
Nintendo Life	8/10
Nintendo World Report	7/10
RPGamer	4/5 stars
Shacknews	8/10

Rift of the NecroDancer received a 79/100 aggregate review score on Metacritic, indicating "generally favorable" reviews.

Charlie Wacholz of IGN described the game as a "Greatest Hits box set for rhythm games," praising the different game modes inspired by various other rhythm games, but noted that the variety results in a game that is "missing a sense of cohesion at times." Giovanni Colantonio from Digital Trends complimented the gameplay and how it felt similar to playing a musical instrument, comparing learning how enemies behave in rift mode to learning how to read sheet music. Colantonio was more mixed on the story mode however, commenting that the boss stages felt "anticlimactic" after the more difficult rhythm rift stages. RPGamer's Ryan Costa also enjoyed the gameplay, but felt the game had some difficulty balance issues, and commented that extended play sessions and the higher difficulty levels were "physically punishing." Ronald Ingram of Nintendo Life also criticized its difficulty, claiming that the harder difficulties "became a step too far" in the latter half of the game, but praised the medium difficulty as leading to "in-the-zone play". Lucas White of Shacknews criticized the lack of any RPG elements compared to Crypt of the NecroDancer. Reviewing the game on Nintendo Switch, Willem Hilhorst of Nintendo World Report wrote the control options are unsatisfactory, feeling that the Joy-Con's directional buttons combined with the game requiring fast inputs made the game unforgiving. Many reviewers compared the game's various modes to games such as Guitar Hero, Rhythm Heaven and Punch-Out.

Reviewers praised the game's soundtrack, noting its use of multiple composers across a variety of music genres.

=== Awards ===
Year	Award	Category	Result	Ref.
2026	The Steam Awards 2025	Best Soundtrack	Nominated	
2026	26th Game Developers Choice Awards	Best Audio	Nominated	
