= Brace Yourself Games =

Canadian video game developer and publisher

- Type: Private
- Industry: Video games
- Founded: 2013; 13 years ago
- Founders: Ryan Clark
- Headquarters: Vancouver, Canada
- Products: Crypt of the NecroDancer; Cadence of Hyrule; Rift of the NecroDancer
- Number of employees: 20 (2025)
- Website: braceyourselfgames.com

Brace Yourself Games is a Canadian independent video game developer and publisher based in Vancouver, Canada. Founded in 2013 by Ryan Clark, the studio is best known for Crypt of the NecroDancer, a rhythm-based roguelike, and its Nintendo collaboration Cadence of Hyrule.

== History ==
Brace Yourself Games began in 2013 in Vancouver, Canada. The studio’s first major success came with Crypt of the NecroDancer, released in April 2015, which introduced a unique fusion of roguelike RPG dungeon mechanics and rhythm-based action.

In 2018, the studio acquired Phantom Brigade developer Tetragon Works, absorbing the studio's staff and taking over the development and publishing of the game.

At Clark’s initiative, the team pitched adding Zelda characters and elements to their Nintendo Switch version of Crypt of the Necrodancer. This collaboration evolved into Cadence of Hyrule, released in June 2019 and published by Nintendo.

In 2022, Brace Yourself Games launched an in-house publishing label, Brace Yourself Publishing to support small indie game developers. In its public announcement, the company stated its desire to publish "a small handful of games to which we give our full attention and care." The company began accepting submissions directly from independent developers, encouraging early-stage projects so long as they include something playable.

On May 18, 2023, Brace Yourself Games announced significant layoffs affecting roughly half its workforce, citing financial pressures and project delays. In an official statement, the company stated that remaining staff would focus on key titles like Rift of the NecroDancer, the Crypt of the NecroDancer: Synchrony DLC, Phantom Brigade, and another untitled game.

In February 2025, the studio released Rift of the NecroDancer for PC and Nintendo Switch. The game won the 2025 Indie Game Award for best music.

== Games developed ==
Year	Title	Platform(s)	Genre(s)
2015	Crypt of the NecroDancer	Linux, OS X, Windows, PlayStation 4, PlayStation Vita, iOS, Xbox One, Nintendo Switch, Android	Roguelike, Rhythm
2019	Cadence of Hyrule	Nintendo Switch	Roguelike, Rhythm
2020	Phantom Brigade	Windows	Turn-based tactics
2023	Industries of Titan	Windows	City-building
2025	Rift of the NecroDancer	Windows, Nintendo Switch	Rhythm

== Games published ==
Year	Title	Developer	Platform(s)	Genre(s)
2023	Cobalt Core	Rocket Rat Games	Windows, Nintendo Switch	Roguelike, Deck-building
2023	Super Raft Boat Together	Shattered Journal Games	Nintendo Switch	Roguelike, Action
