= Crypt of the NecroDancer =

2015 video game

- Developers: Brace Yourself Games; Vortex Buffer
- Publishers: Brace Yourself Games; Klei Entertainment (PC); JP: Spike Chunsoft
- Director: Ryan Clark
- Producer: Heather Wilson
- Designer: Ryan Clark
- Programmers: Oliver Trujillo; Ryan Clark
- Artist: Ted Martens
- Writers: Ryan Clark; Oliver Trujillo; Kathryn Clark (now Sykes)
- Composer: Danny Baranowsky
- Platforms: Linux, OS X, Windows, PlayStation 4, PlayStation Vita, iOS, Xbox One, Nintendo Switch, Android
- Release: Linux, OS X, Windows; April 23, 2015; PS4, PS Vita; February 2, 2016; iOS; June 30, 2016; Xbox One; February 10, 2017; Nintendo Switch; February 8, 2018; Android; June 8, 2021
- Genres: Roguelike, rhythm
- Modes: Single-player, multiplayer

Crypt of the NecroDancer is a 2015 roguelike rhythm game created by Brace Yourself Games. The game takes fundamental elements of a roguelike dungeon exploration game and adds a beat-matching rhythm game set to an original soundtrack written by Danny Baranowsky. The player's actions are most effective when moving the character set to the beat of the current song and are impaired when they miss a beat, so it is necessary to learn the rhythmic patterns that the various creatures follow. The mixed-genre game includes the ability to import custom music, and the option to use a dance pad instead of traditional controllers or the keyboard. The game was released for Linux, OS X, and Windows in April 2015, being co-published by Klei Entertainment, for the PlayStation 4 and Vita in February 2016, for the Xbox One in February 2017, and for Nintendo Switch in February 2018. Crypt of the NecroDancer Pocket Edition, developed for iOS, was released in June 2016.

A crossover title, Cadence of Hyrule, featuring music and elements from The Legend of Zelda, was released in June 2019 for the Nintendo Switch. A DLC pinball table for Pinball FX was released on April 13, 2023. A spin-off game, Rift of the NecroDancer, was released on February 5, 2025.

== Gameplay ==
Crypt of the NecroDancer is a top-down 2D game in which the player controls one of a selection of characters to explore several levels of an underground dungeon that are procedurally generated, similar to roguelike games.

The player can manipulate their character by using either a dance pad, a keyboard, or a gamepad. Unlike traditional roguelikes, the player can only move their character or attack if they perform the action on the beat of the music. Enemies drop coins when killed, and killing successive enemies without taking damage or missing a beat increases a coin-scoring multiplier. Failure to match the beat does not directly harm the character in most situations, but does reset the scoring multiplier and may cause the character to be damaged by a nearby monster if they are in their attack path. The character can also be harmed by moving into a monster's path. When the character's health meter empties, the game is over. Monsters move according to predetermined patterns that the player must learn to attack and avoid damage. For example, skeletons target the player directly, but only move and attack on every other beat.

Crypt of the NecroDancer screenshot of the 0.244alpha version showing Cadence, a playable character (middle) next to two blue slimes (left), a titanium broadsword (right) as well as some dropped gold coins. She has 3 spells, which is not normally possible in release versions of the game.

As the player explores, they will collect new weapons, armor, usable items, and treasure. The player's inventory is automatically managed by the game. Defeating monsters yields several coins that can be used to purchase items from shops within the dungeon. Some diamonds are used for purchasing permanent enhancements to the character's abilities in the game's lobby. The dungeon is divided into four zones of four levels each. The first three levels of each zone require the player to find the exit and defeat a mini-boss to unlock it. The fourth level is a larger boss character that must be defeated to progress further. The player is also limited to the length of the song to complete the level. When the song ends, the player is automatically sent to the next level through a trapdoor, landing close to powerful enemies if the boss from the previous floor was not defeated.

The player returns to the game's lobby area after dying, losing their items, gold, or other equipment, though retaining any diamonds they have found. The lobby features shops where the player can spend the diamonds on permanent upgrades before restarting the game or, if they have completed any zones, accessing the next available zone. Other game modes can also be accessed, such as "All Zones Mode", in which the player must make their way through the entire crypt without dying. The player initially has access to the main character, Cadence, but new characters with different modes of play also become available as certain goals are completed. For example, the monk character receives one free item in each shop, but immediately dies if he touches gold. Special trainers and other beneficial non-player characters can be rescued from certain zones, and once rescued, will provide services to the player from the main lobby. This includes letting the player train against enemies and bosses, or providing items that can be purchased with diamonds and used on the next journey into the crypt.

The songs in the soundtracks are ordered in ascending tempo across zones and levels, making deeper levels more challenging than earlier ones. The player additionally has the ability to set custom music for each of the levels.

== Plot ==
In the main game, the player controls Cadence, the daughter of a famed treasure hunter who has gone missing. In searching for him, she falls into a crypt controlled by the NecroDancer, who steals Cadence's heart and forces her to challenge his minions to retrieve it. She is forced to fight through the crypt's dungeon with her actions tied to the beat of the music and her heart, so as to stay alive and defeat the NecroDancer.

Near the heart of the crypt, Cadence finds one of the NecroDancer's minions named "Dead Ringer". She defeats him, revealing that it was her missing father and frees him from the NecroDancer's control, allowing him to help her defeat the NecroDancer. They take the NecroDancer's magical golden Lute and use it to kill him, and then use its power to resurrect Cadence's dead mother, Melody. However, they discover that the lute is cursed. Melody must keep playing it forever to sustain her life, but the lute will gradually consume her humanity just as it did to the NecroDancer. Melody enters the crypt in search of answers and a way to break the curse of the lute.

When Melody reaches the end of the crypt, she uses the Golden Lute to resurrect the NecroDancer and find answers, but he attacks and Melody defeats him. The NecroDancer tries to flee, but is cast into a crevice by Aria (Melody's mother) who was lying in a coffin with a dagger in her chest and is brought back to life by the Lute. Aria reveals that she knows how to break the curse of the lute, but was betrayed by the NecroDancer and left for dead. Intending to finish what she started, she begins her ascent out of the crypt in search of a shrine that will destroy the lute once and for all.

When Aria reaches the shrine, she is attacked by the lute itself, which mutates into a large monster in an attempt to save itself from destruction. After defeating the lute's monster form, Aria sacrifices her life to destroy the cursed instrument, restoring Melody to full life and allowing her to return to her family, who later bury Aria together.

== Development ==
Crypt of the NecroDancer was a creation of Canadian programmer Ryan Clark, inspired by thinking about the traditional structure of roguelike games. Clark found that the player-character's death in roguelikes often occurred due to conditions created by the procedural-generation of the game as opposed to player's skill, and wanted to make a game that was more "fair" to escape or avoid seemingly difficult situations. Clark considered how games like Spelunky put the player more in control of their fate, as he viewed it as "a game that is really hard but you can still improve. If you die, you still know it was your fault" whereas in other games, the player might die because "the game is simply unfair". However, Clark also discovered that removing the turn-based nature of roguelikes in games such as Spelunky or FTL: Faster Than Light lost some of the flavors of roguelikes, and sought a way to maintain the turn-based nature. He came up with the idea of using turns where each turn lasted only a short amount of real-time. As such, the "lack of time to think renders impossible the careful study and patience of the expert NetHack player". With this concept, Clark recognized that this was similar to beat-matching rhythm games, and quickly refined the concept around the rhythm-based roguelike game. The title came after discovering this concept, and plays on the pun of the word "necromancer".

Clark initially programmed the game to require the player to be relatively accurate to the music's beat, similar to the accuracy used by rhythm games. He found this timing to be too tense, as the player was more likely to miss the short accuracy window while stressed and would lead to the character being harmed, creating even more stress. Instead, he greatly expanded the accuracy window, as well as programmed a simple autocalibration system that recognized if the player was ahead or behind the beat to some degree to match the current stress levels, both aimed to help make the game fairer and remove frustration. Furthermore, he found that when he made the player move on the beat and monsters on the half-beat, the game played too close to a roguelike and instead made all characters move on the beat, with the player's action having priority. While this posed a few drawbacks he had to program around, it felt much more natural to the game.

The Beat tracking algorithm used in the game is known as the Multi-feature Beat tracker. It is implemented in the Essentia framework and determines the positions of the beats to estimate the beats per minute, which is then used to set the tempo. The game was developed using the Monkey X programming language.

The game was released on Steam early access on July 30, 2014, using public feedback to improve the title, with full release on April 23, 2015. The game was released for the PlayStation 4 and PlayStation Vita on February 2, 2016. An iOS version, with support for both screen and Bluetooth controllers, was released on June 30, 2016. An Xbox One version was released on February 10, 2017.

A downloadable content prequel expansion, Crypt of the NecroDancer: Amplified, was released through Early Access on Steam on January 24, 2017, to get feedback during development, with the full release coming later that year. The expansion includes an additional zone, a new boss named Fortissimole, a new protagonist called Nocturna, new non-main characters named Diamond, Mary and Tempo, a new soundtrack by OverClocked ReMix, new items for the game, including familiars for the protagonist, along with various other changes and fixes.

A Nintendo Switch version, Crypt of the NecroDancer: Nintendo Switch Edition, was released on February 1, 2018. In addition to including Amplified content as part of the base package, this version introduced a new non-main character named Reaper and co-operative support.

A major update to Crypt of the NecroDancer was released in July 2022. Besides making the game more compatible with the Steam Deck, the update included a "No Beat" mode that allows players to use any character without needing to follow the beat (like the character Bard), as well as a much improved level editor. This update, and all subsequent updates, are from a different development team, Vortex Buffer, who started making this update as a fan-made mod of the game before getting hired. It features a complete rewrite of the game engine. This engine is powered by C++ and Lua.

In August 2022, the title received its second DLC expansion, Crypt of the NecroDancer: Synchrony, as part of Steam early access, with the full release for PC, Mac, Linux, PlayStation, and Nintendo Switch releasing in March 2024. It includes three new characters, several new items, enemies, and traps, visible items on player sprites, and co-op and competitive online multiplayer support for up to eight players, along with various other changes and fixes.

A character DLC featuring Hatsune Miku was released for PC, PlayStation 4, and Nintendo Switch in April 2024, a character DLC featuring Shovel Knight was released for PC in October 2025 to coincide with a Shovel Knight DLC releasing for Rift of the NecroDancer, and a Supporter DLC featuring skins based on Rift of the NecroDancer was released for PC in December 2025.

=== Music ===
The soundtrack was composed by Danny Baranowsky, designed to vary in speed and rhythmic complexity the further the player gets within the game. Baranowsky's friend dubbed the new genre of music "Spookhouse Rock". The game has four additional soundtracks: an EDM soundtrack by Alex Esquivel ("A_Rival") from group Super Square, a heavy metal soundtrack by YouTube personality Jules Conroy, better known as "FamilyJules", a "freestyle retro" soundtrack by composer Jake Kaufman, also known as "virt", and a synthwave soundtrack by artists from Girlfriend Records.

The Japanese PlayStation versions of the game added a fifth additional soundtrack by Masafumi Takada, consisting of new arrangements from the Danganronpa franchise. These arrangements were made to fit the song length and BPM of the original soundtrack, so they don't effect leaderboard submission. It was also included with Spike Chunsoft skins.

Similarly, the Japanese PlayStation versions of the game were updated with a sixth additional soundtrack based on Groove Coaster. It includes eleven songs original to the Groove Coaster franchise and six songs from other games that were featured in Groove Coaster. The songs have been arranged to fit the song length and BPM of the original soundtrack, so they don't effect leaderboard submission. It was also included with Groove Coaster skins. The soundtrack has since been brought to other versions, but is currently still absent from the PC release. This soundtrack was added along with songs from the original soundtrack and the Danganronpa arrangements being added to Groove Coaster 3: Link Fever.

The Crypt of the Necrodancer: Amplified DLC added a seventh additional soundtrack by OverClocked ReMix.

The Xbox One version added an eighth additional soundtrack by Chipzel.

A free update to the PC version was released in August 2017, adding The Danganronpa soundtrack from the PlayStation release and the Chipzel soundtrack from the Xbox One release.

Hatsune Miku character DLC in April 2024 added a ninth soundtrack, consisting of several Hatsune Miku songs, including two new tracks composed by Danny Baranowsky exclusively for Crypt of the Necrodancer. The songs haven't had their lengths or speed edited to fit the original game's soundtracks, so it submits to alternate leaderboards for most characters.

Shovel Knight character DLC in October 2025 added an tenth soundtrack, consisting of several songs from the Shovel Knight franchise. The songs haven't had their lengths or speed edited to fit the original game's soundtracks, so it submits to alternate leaderboards for most characters, and the songs even loop.

== Reception ==
=== Critical reviews ===
Reception

Aggregate score
Aggregator	Score
Metacritic	PC: 87/100; PS4: 85/100 iOS: 92/100; XONE: 83/100; NS: 86/100

Review scores
Publication	Score
Destructoid	9.5/10
Edge	9/10
Game Informer	8/10
IGN	8.8/10
TouchArcade	5/5

Critical reception was positive. Destructoid named the game one of their favorite entries at PAX Prime 2013, and praised its execution. Joystiq also gave the game a positive review. Gaming Age described the game as "a wildly imaginative take on the formula".

=== Accolades ===
Year	Award	Category	Result	Ref.
2015	SXSW Gaming Awards	Excellence in Musical Score	Nominated	
2016	The Edge Awards 2015	PC Game of the Year	Runner-Up	
2016	The Edge Awards 2015	Best Audio Design	Runner-Up	
2016	Game Developers Choice Awards	Best Audio	Won	
2016	National Academy of Video Game Trade Reviewers	Original Light Mix Score (New IP)	Nominated	
2016	National Academy of Video Game Trade Reviewers	Use of Sound (New IP)	Won	
2016	National Academy of Video Game Trade Reviewers	Game (Music or Performance-Based)	Won	

== Sequels ==
=== Cadence of Hyrule ===
When developing the Switch version of Crypt of the Necrodancer, Brace Yourself Games approached Nintendo about providing downloadable based on Nintendo's properties, specifically The Legend of Zelda. Nintendo proved highly interested in a collaboration, leading to further discussions that resulted in an entirely new crossover game, Cadence of Hyrule - Crypt of the NecroDancer Featuring The Legend of Zelda, based on Crypt's gameplay mechanics, but taking place within the universe of Zelda.

The crossover was released exclusively for the Nintendo Switch on June 13, 2019. In the main story mode, players play as either Link or Zelda, with Cadence becoming playable later in the game.

=== Rift of the Necrodancer ===
In August 2022, Brace Yourself Games announced a third title in the series, titled Rift of the NecroDancer. Taking place in the modern day, Rift is a more traditional rhythm game that sees Cadence repairing dimensional rifts created by the titular Necrodancer. Originally planned for a 2023 release on PC and Nintendo Switch, the game was later delayed into 2024, before finally seeing release in February 2025 for PC.
