= Cobalt Core =

- Developer: Rocket Rat Games
- Publisher: Brace Yourself Games
- Composer: Aaron Cherof
- Engine: FNA / MonoGame
- Platforms: Nintendo Switch; Windows; macOS
- Release: Nintendo Switch, Windows; November 8, 2023; macOS; July 28, 2025
- Genre: Roguelike deck-building
- Mode: Single-player

Cobalt Core is a sci-fi roguelike deck-building game released in November 2023 for Nintendo Switch and Windows, and in July 2025 for macOS, developed by Rocket Rat Games and published by Brace Yourself Games. It follows a group of anthropomorphic animals trapped in a time loop, fighting various enemy spacecraft in an attempt to discover the origin of the loop and escape it.

== Gameplay ==
Cobalt Core has the player guide a spacecraft piloted by three of eight possible characters through several hostile territories and fighting against other spacecraft. At first there are only three characters and one spacecraft to choose from, more are unlocked as the player progresses. Each character brings a set of cards related to their expertise that is added to the player's initial deck, and extra cards can be earned by defeating other ships. Over the course of a run, the player can also upgrade or remove cards from their deck. Defeating certain boss ships can also gain artifacts that affect the player's ship as a whole, or boosts the abilities for cards for one of the characters.

When in combat, the player generally starts with five cards from a shuffled deck at the start of each round, and three action points to expend in playing cards. Cards can provide attack abilities, defensive shields, or allow the player to shift the spacecraft left or right to avoid incoming fire. The enemy ship's attacks or actions on their upcoming turn are shown to the player, allowing them to plan out their actions. After using all action points and shift actions, the turn is resolved, with the player discarding their hand and gaining a new hand of five cards. Combat continues until either the enemy is destroyed, allowing the player to direct the ship to the next encounter, or the player's ship is destroyed, forcing them to restart the game but giving them the opportunity to select different characters and modifiers.

== Plot ==
The game begins in medias res with three characters - Dizzy, a science officer, Peri, a weapons officer, and Riggs, a pilot - waking up in their attack spacecraft, the Artemis, at the beginning of a time loop. It is implied that they have been through a number of previous loops after being trapped inside a pocket dimension by an unknown event. The ship's AI, CAT, somehow remembers each loop and brings them to their senses every time. Every loop, they battle through several areas against enemies such as space pirates and derelict automated drones, and arrive at the Cobalt, a massive and highly advanced ancient warship within a powerful spatial distortion. CAT leaves the ship at the end of each loop to hijack the Cobalt just long enough to force it to attack the crew before being deleted by its cyber-defenses. Each time the crew successfully destroys the Cobalt, they regain one of their lost memories from a mysterious higher-dimensional being.

In their travels, they come across several other major characters who join their crew - Isaac, a drone operator, Drake, a space pirate, Max, a computer tech and hacker, and Books, an "alchemist" who was completely uninvolved in the instigating event and simply entered the pocket dimension out of curiosity. They also encounter a copy of Riggs who has become a pirate, and claims she is the original version. As they regain their memories, the crew slowly realize what had occurred. Dizzy, Peri, Isaac and Max were members of an organization doing research on the Cobalt, which was left by an extinct alien race, and its core, a time crystal. Riggs became the new cargo ship pilot for the Cobalt and befriended the rest of the crew, but fell in with Drake, who convinced her to help steal the crystal and sell it for a fortune. Meanwhile, Max created CAT to function as the interface for the Cobalt's AI system and hooked the AI up to the crystal's analysis beam. While the experiment was running, Riggs attempted to steal the crystal, but triggered a malfunction. In desperation, she broke off a small shard of the crystal before everyone became trapped. Being the closest in proximity to the crystal, Riggs was split into two separate entities.

Once everyone regains their full memories, the player gains control of CAT and the Cobalt itself. CAT reveals that in fact she was the one who became sentient and ascended into a higher dimension as a result of the crystal overloading while she was inside it, something she realized while analyzing a hidden file. As the pocket dimension collapses, CAT collects all the crew members, as well as the alternate Riggs, who merges with the original into a single being again. The Cobalt successfully escapes the pocket dimension by combining CAT's power with that of the crew, and everyone safely lands on a nearby celestial body.

== Development ==
Cobalt Core was the second game developed by Rocket Rat Games, co-founded by John Guerra and Ben Driscoll. They had been finishing development of their first game, Sunshine Heavy Industries, a spacecraft-based puzzle game, around October 2021, and were trying to determine what their second game would be. Guerra had then played Inscryption, and coupled with players of Sunshine Heavy Industries wanting to pilot the spacecraft they had created, the two came up with the idea of a spacecraft-based roguelike deckbuilder. Both had played Slay the Spire, but wanted to introduce new ideas. They took inspiration from how ships in Star Trek were crewed, with characters interjecting dialog during encounters, an idea that they had seen in the game Reigns.

As Guerra and Driscoll were located on opposites of the United States, their prototype development was performed in Tabletop Simulator, with Driscoll playing against Guerra as a simulation of the computer opponents. Once they established the core gameplay, Guerra continued to work to refine the cards, while Driscoll created the characters and art for the game. They introduced the use of time travel as a mechanic of the larger game so that the characters, such as CAT the computer, had a meta-like awareness of the loop, a similar concept to Inscryption's living cards.

A demo for Cobalt Core was released during the October 2023 Steam Next Fest event. The game was released on the Nintendo Switch and Windows on November 8, 2023.

== Reception ==
Cobalt Core had received positive reviews from critics, with a 94 aggregate score from Metacritic. Critics generally praised the compactness of the gameplay loop and the characters, though felt that the game's length to unlock everything was comparatively short compared to other roguelike deckbuilders, and lacked randomness in the various boss battles.

During the 27th Annual D.I.C.E. Awards, the Academy of Interactive Arts & Sciences nominated Cobalt Core for "Strategy/Simulation Game of the Year".
