= It's dangerous to go alone! =

Video game quotation

The original usage of the phrase in The Legend of Zelda (1986)

"It's dangerous to go alone! Take this." is a quotation from the 1986 video game The Legend of Zelda.‍ (Note: Due to technical constraints, the original Japanese version of this line (published with the 1986 Famicom Disk System release) was rendered in single-byte katakana rather than double-byte Shift JIS characters as would be expected for standard Japanese writing. The original line reads: Hitori de wa kiken ja kore o sazukeyō (ヒトリデハキケンジャ コレヲ サズケヨウ). The line was rendered in hiragana for Week 1 of the 1995 spin-off Satellaview broadcast game, BS Zelda no Densetsu, as ひとりでは きけんじゃ これを さずけよう.) It is spoken by an unnamed old man, whom the player can meet in a cave at the beginning of the game; he gives the player character Link a sword to aid his quest to defeat Ganon and rescue Princess Zelda. The quote has been referenced in video gaming and other media, has become an Internet meme, and has been established in pop culture.

== Description ==
In 1986, Nintendo released the original The Legend of Zelda video game on the Nintendo Entertainment System. It opens with the protagonist, Link, entering a cave to meet an old man who offers him a wooden sword and says: "It's dangerous to go alone! Take this." The player is given no further explanation within the game world on how to progress. Series creator Shigeru Miyamoto thought that it would be more enjoyable to play the game without any help.

== Reception ==
The quote has spawned many variations and became a popular image macro. IGN positioned it at #22 on its top 100 video game moments list, describing it as "one of the most-quoted video game sentences" and the best example of the exploration element of The Legend of Zelda. GamesRadar featured it in its list of the 40 most-repeated video game quotes and of the top 100 best video game quotes. Ozzie Mejia for Shacknews opined that the quote "has become synonymous with gaming in the 35 years since they were first spoken. More than that, it's seeped into the greater world of pop culture. It's been referenced in other games, television, merchandise, memes, and much more".

Christian Donlan, writing for Eurogamer, stated that the phrase is "one of the most famous in all of video games" and opined that it acts as a "universal guide for playing Zelda". He also felt that the phrase is memorable due to its compact nature and slightly awkward phrasing, which he described as "the perverse music of utility". Phil Hornshaw of GameSpot commented on the legacy of the quotation within the original The Legend of Zelda game by stating that "there's still nothing quite like wandering through [the game's] enormous, mysterious world, with barely a hint or explanation to lead you on. It was dangerous to go alone. No help was coming. No guideposts were set along the way. There was just you, your sword, the pull to explore, and a game that rewarded you with nothing but hours of discovery."

NF Magazine commented that the quote was well-known and appeared "time and time again" in gaming culture. They noted that it was representative of the original Zelda's nonlinear gameplay, saying that while taking the sword from the old man was the smartest choice, the player did not have to enter the cave, and could instead proceed weaponless and begin to explore the overworld. In Power-Up, Chris Kohler criticized the phrase as "done by a Japanese person with a shaky grasp of the English language", though calling it "practically Shakespeare" compared to other quotes from the same character, such as "one who does not have Triforce can't go in".

== See also ==
- "I am Error", a quote from Zelda II: The Adventure of Link (1987)
- "Our princess is in another castle!", a quote from Super Mario Bros. (1985)
