= Our princess is in another castle! =

Quote from Super Mario Bros.

The phrase originated in Super Mario Bros. (1985). A Mushroom retainer informs Mario that Princess Toadstool has not yet been rescued.

"Thank you Mario! But our princess is in another castle!" is a quote from Super Mario Bros., a 1985 platform game for the Nintendo Entertainment System. It is stated by a Mushroom retainer after Mario defeats what appears to be the antagonist, Bowser. This informs the player that the damsel in distress Princess Toadstool is elsewhere, and implies that the defeated boss was a decoy. The quote is repeated at the end of each of the first seven castle levels, until the real Bowser is defeated in the final stage.

It became one of the most famous quotes in video game history, and an Internet meme. It is referenced in some subsequent Mario games, either unironically or humorously. Critics have used it ironically, to highlight the damsel in distress cliché in video games.

== Appearances ==
=== Mario franchise ===
The quote first appeared in Super Mario Bros., when Mario fails to find Princess Toadstool. It is repeated for each of Bowser's castles, except the final one.

In the English version of Super Mario Bros. 3 released in 1988, Princess Toadstool says the line upon being rescued by Mario, admitting it is a joke.

The line is referenced in the role-playing video game Mario & Luigi: Partners in Time (2005), in which a Toad character assures the player that the princess is not in another castle.

As an Easter egg in the 2023 film The Super Mario Bros. Movie, the Toads guarding Peach's Castle utter the line to Mario as a joke.

=== Others ===
The sixth and final track on Black Pear Tree, a 2008 collaborative extended play by the band The Mountain Goats and American guitarist-composer Kaki King, is titled "Thank You Mario but our Princess Is in Another Castle".

== Development ==
In the Japanese version of Super Mario Bros., the line is in English. This is due to the pervasive use of English in modern Japan, and due to the English alphabet conserving more cartridge space than Japanese kana.

== Reception ==
Meghan Sullivan of IGN called it an unforgettable quote in video game history, and a "super effective metaphor for life". She noted that, metaphorically speaking, there is "always another castle" that needs the hero, but also stated that each life can be rewarding nonetheless, and that with enough perseverance, the princess can actually be rescued. Josh Straub of Game Informer also described it as an iconic moment in games, saying that the line "continues to haunt gamers". He cited its repetition throughout the game as evidence of the Nintendo designers' delight at "yanking" away the player's hope, evidencing its use in Super Mario 3D Land (2011) that "the message is still the same 29 years later".

In the 2012 book Super Mario: How Nintendo Conquered America, author Jeff Ryan highlights the use of the word "our" rather than "the" or "your", saying that it includes the player within the quest, and that its constant repetition turns Mario into an analog for Odysseus. Gabrielle Trepaniér-Jobin, writing in Gaming Representation, argued that Princess Peach's use of the line as a prank in Super Mario Bros. 3 depicts her as less dependent and subordinate than in previous games, going against the notion shown in the original Super Mario Bros. that a woman is indebted to her rescuer.

== See also ==
- "It's dangerous to go alone!", quote from The Legend of Zelda (1986)
- "I am Error", quote from Zelda II: The Adventure of Link (1987)
