= Desktop Dungeons =

2013 video game

- Developer: QCF Design
- Publisher: QCF Design
- Composers: Danny Baranowsky; Grant Kirkhope
- Engine: Unity
- Platforms: Windows, Mac, Linux, iOS, Android
- Release: November 7, 2013; Rewind edition: 2023
- Genre: Role-playing
- Mode: Single-player

Desktop Dungeons is a single-player roguelike-like puzzle video game developed and published by QCF Design. Released in November 2013, the game underwent a lengthy public beta phase, during which it was available to customers who pre-ordered the game. In the game, players navigate a dungeon filled with monsters before battling a final dungeon boss. The game has qualities of a puzzle as players must find the best methods to use items, spells, and upgrades to reach the final boss without losing too much of their character's health. Desktop Dungeons has been compared to a roguelike but with condensed gameplay. Desktop Dungeons received an award for Excellence in Design at the 2011 Independent Games Festival. The game is available for Windows, Mac, Linux, iOS, and Android. A video game remake titled Desktop Dungeons: Rewind was announced in 2022 and released April 18, 2023.

== Gameplay ==
The game plays as a condensed roguelike with sessions taking only about 10 minutes to play. Players choose a race and class for a character before sending them into a randomly generated dungeon. After completing dungeons, players are rewarded with the ability to unlock new character classes, starting weapons, and bonus dungeons. Players can worship different deities at altars, who then bestow upon the worshipers a set of rules which benefit the player if they are followed or harm them if they are not.

Video game modders can create tilesets for the game which changes the appearance of the dungeon. Derek Yu, the creator of the video game Spelunky, created one such tileset which the developers of Desktop Dungeons decided to use as the default appearance for the game.

== Development ==
The beta version (right) included graphical improvements and new features not found in the alpha version (left)

Desktop Dungeons is developed by a three-man team in South Africa. Rodain Joubert says that he began development of the game in January 2010 after having played many roguelike games and then reading a manifesto written by Edmund McMillen, the creator of Super Meat Boy and initial character artist and animator on Braid. The alpha version of the game was written using Game Maker, and one of the major changes to the game during the alpha development was the ability to worship gods at altars which affected the course of a dungeon run.

The beta featured a significant graphical upgrade from the free alpha version and included a new tutorial system, changes to character progression, player inventory, and an adventuring locker to store items between dungeon runs.

== Preliminary release and reception ==
The preliminary reception among critics based on the released beta version has been generally positive. The game was available for pre-order during this period, allowing users to access a beta version. A Special Edition of the game was also available for pre-order which includes extra quests and character classes. An Exclusive Edition pre-order of the game was also sold for which customers would have their names mentioned in the game as well as in the credits. With the changes made for the beta version, Rock, Paper, Shotgun's writer Alec Meer praised, "Desktop Dungeons is now easily the game it always deserved to be." The game received an award for Excellence in Design at the 2011 Independent Games Festival. The game was listed at #3 in Gamasutra's Top 10 Indie Games of 2010.

=== Remake ===
Desktop Dungeons: Rewind is a remake of the game, announced in April 2022. It is a fully 3D remake, featuring new art and graphics, retaining its original gameplay and including all DLC content. It has a new soundtrack done by Danny Baranowsky and Grant Kirkhope. The remake also features additional quality-of-life features, including the ability to rewind and undo steps taken in a dungeon.

== Cloning controversy ==
Eric Farraro, developing under the pseudonym Lazy Peon, created an iPhone game titled League Of Epic Heroes after playing the beta version of Desktop Dungeons. Farraro announced League of Epic Heroes in an internet post in October 2010 and stated, "To give credit where credit is due, League is based on the core gameplay of Desktop Dungeons." League of Epic Heroes uses the same mechanics, character classes, spells, and progression system as Desktop Dungeons, but none of the graphics, sound effects, source code, or other game resources. Farraro contacted QCF Design on November 12, 2010, with information about the game he was creating and claiming that the game was not a clone. Despite QCF Design's request that Farraro not release the game, League of Epic Heroes was released in the Apple App Store on November 23, 2010. Following a copyright infringement notice from QCF's lawyers, Farraro removed League of Epic Heroes from the App Store.
