= All your base are belong to us =

Internet meme from a video game

The phrase as it appears in the introduction to Zero Wing

"All your base are belong to us" is an Internet meme based on a poorly translated phrase from the opening cutscene of the Japanese video game Zero Wing. The phrase first appeared on the European release of the 1991 Sega Mega Drive conversion of the 1989 Japanese arcade game.

By the early 2000s, a GIF animation depicting the opening text became widespread on web forums. A music video accompanied by a techno remix of the clip, originally posted on the website Newgrounds, gained popularity and became a derivative Internet meme in its own right. The original meme has been referenced many times in media outside of the forums.

The original phrase in Japanese, uttered by the enigmatic antagonist "CATS", is "君達の基地は、全てCATSがいただいた" (Hepburn Romanization: Kimitachi no kichi wa subete CATS ga itadaita), which can be translated more accurately as "All of your bases have been taken over by CATS" (see the transcript below).

== Zero Wing transcript ==
Below are some other examples of text as it appeared in the poorly translated English release, alongside a more accurate translation from the original Japanese, and the one from the 2023 PC re-release.

Original script	Rōmaji	Basic translation from Japanese	English version (1991) (Note: Original broken English translation as it appeared in the released video game.)	English version (2023) (Note: Revised English translation as it appeared in the updated re-release.)
機関士：何者(なにもの)かによって、爆発物(ばくはつぶつ)が仕掛(しか)けられたようです。	Kikanshi: Nanimono ka ni yotte, bakuhatsu-mono ga shikake rareta yōdesu.	Engineer: It appears someone has planted explosives.	Mechanic: Somebody set up us the bomb.	Mechanic: Someone set up bombs all over the ship.
通信士：メインスクリーンにビジョンが来(き)ます。	Tsūshinshi: Meinsukurīn ni bijon ga kimasu.	Communications Operator: Incoming visual on the main screen.	Operator: Main screen turn on.	Operator: Main screen turned on.
CATS：連邦政府(れんぽうせいふ)軍(ぐん)のご協力(きょうりょく)により、君達(きみたち)の基地(きち)は、 全(すべ)てCATSがいただいた。	CATS: Renbōseifu-gun no go kyōryoku ni yori, kimitachi no kichi wa, subete CATS ga itadaita.	CATS: With the help of Federation government forces, CATS has taken all of your bases.	CATS: All your base are belong to us.	
CATS：せいぜい残(のこ)り少(すく)ない命(いのち)を、大切(たいせつ)にしたまえ・・・・。	CATS: Seizei nokorisukunai inochi o, taisetsu ni shita ma e.	CATS: Treasure what little time you have left to live…	CATS: You have no chance to survive make your time.	CATS: You have no chance to survive, make your time.
艦長：たのむぞ。ZIG！！	Kanchou: Tanomu zo. ZIG!!	Captain: We're counting on you, ZIG!!	Captain: Move 'ZIG'.	Captain: We are counting on the ZIGs!!
艦長：我(われ)々(われ)の未来(みらい)に希望(きぼう)を・・・	Kanchou: Wareware no mirai ni kibō o…	Captain: May there be hope for our future…	Captain: For great justice.	Captain: May there be hope for our future…

== History ==
External videos
- YouTube video of the opening sequence, featuring the line
- Newgrounds post where the music video was posted

Zero Wing was released in Japanese arcades by developer Toaplan on 1 July 1989, and in North America in April 1990. The European release of the game on the Sega Mega Drive, also known as the Sega Genesis, which contained the script of the meme's origin, occurred in May 1992.

Zero Wing is one of the most widely known examples of poor linguistic translation in video games. Toaplan staff Tatsuya Uemura (programmer and music composer of Zero Wing and Toaplan founding member) and Masahiro Yuge (fellow Toaplan composer and founder) addressed the meme in interviews during the 2010s. According to Uemura, the English translation in the Mega Drive version was handled by a member of the Toaplan design team in charge of export and overseas business, and not by a professional translator. Uemura said that the English skills of the team member who prepared the translations were "really terrible".

The first references of the meme could be seen in 1999 and the early 2000s when an animated GIF of the scene appeared on forums and sites like Zany Video Game Quotes, OverClocked, and TribalWar forums. In November 2000, Kansas City computer programmer and part-time disc jockey Jeffrey Ray Roberts (1977–2011), of the gabber band The Laziest Men on Mars, made a techno dance track, "Invasion of the Gabber Robots", which remixed some of the Zero Wing video game music with a voice-over of the phrase, "All your base are belong to us". (The original music for Zero Wing was written by Tatsuya Uemura and arranged by Noriyuki Iwadare.) On 16 February 2001, user Bad_CRC posted an animated music video accompanying the song onto the Flash game and animation sharing site Newgrounds. The video was shared rapidly, soon becoming an Internet meme and receiving widespread media attention. The meme's popularity was seen throughout the 2000s when it was broadcast unauthorized onto the ticker of a Raleigh, North Carolina, TV channel, used as a placeholder message by YouTube while under maintenance, and reproduced onto T-shirts.

The 15th and 20th anniversaries of the posting of the remix on Newgrounds were recognized by numerous culture sites. The meme has been highlighted for its uniqueness in that, unlike other memes of the time, it lacked sexual innuendos or vulgarity.

== Mentions in media ==
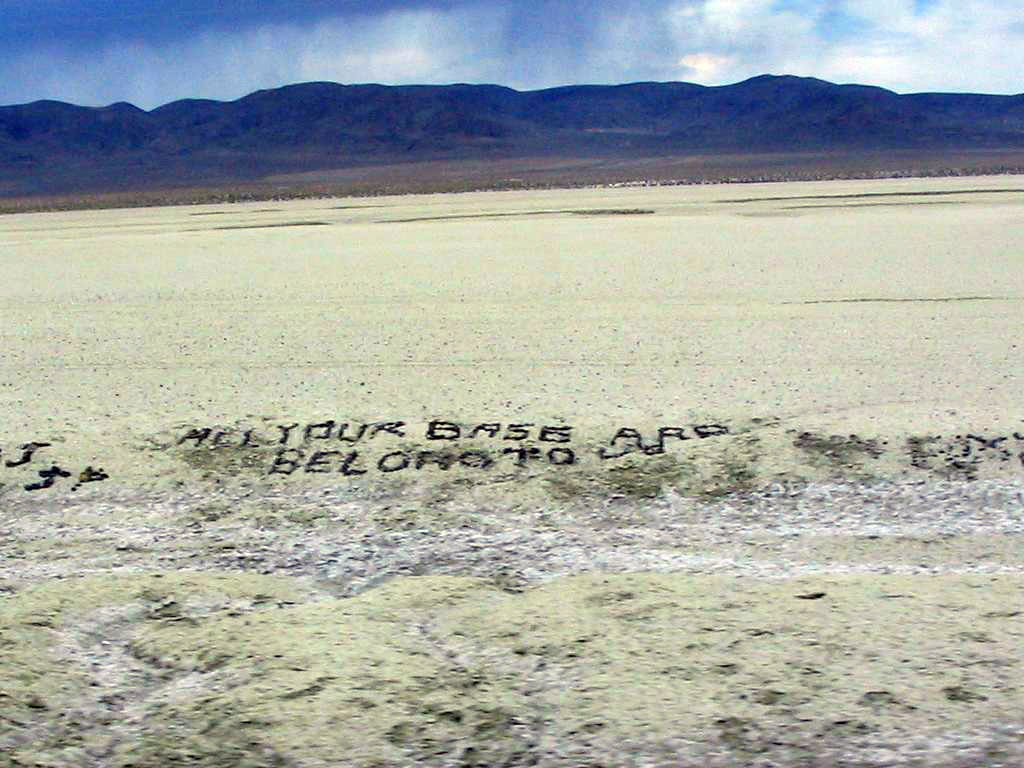
"All Your Base Are Belong to Us" graffitied on the side of U.S. Route 50 in Nevada

The phrase or some variation of lines from the game has appeared numerous times in films, commercials, news broadcasts, other games, and social media posts.

On 1 April 2003, in Sturgis, Michigan, seven people placed signs through the town that read: "All your base are belong to us. You have no chance to survive make your time." They claimed to be playing an April Fools' joke, but most people who saw the signs were unfamiliar with the phrase. Many residents were upset that the signs appeared while the US was at war with Iraq, and police chief Eugene Alli said the signs could be "a borderline terrorist threat, depending on what someone interprets it to mean".

In February 2004, North Carolina State University students and members of TheWolfWeb in Raleigh, North Carolina, exploited a web-based service used by local schools and businesses to report weather-related closures to display the phrase within a news ticker on a live news broadcast on News 14 Carolina.

On 1 June 2006, the phrase "All Your Video Are Belong to Us" appeared in all-caps below the YouTube logo as a placeholder while YouTube was under maintenance. Some users believed the site had been hacked, leading YouTube to add the message "No, we haven't be [sic] hacked. Get a sense of humor."

In the E3 2016 demo for the 2017 video game The Legend of Zelda: Breath of the Wild, "all your base are" could be seen written in the game's symbol-based fictional language.

On 19 January 2019, Democratic Party congresswoman Alexandria Ocasio-Cortez of New York tweeted "All your base (are) belong to us" in response to a poll which found that 45% of Republicans approved of her suggested implementation of a 70% marginal tax rate for individual income over $10 million per year.

== See also ==
- Linguistic interference – Influence one language has on the acquisition or intelligibility of another
- Code-switching – Changing between languages during a conversation
- The cake is a lie – Internet meme from the video game Portal
- English as She Is Spoke – Book by Pedro Carolino
- List of Internet phenomena
- Lolcat – Internet meme involving images of cats
- I am Error
