= Cortex Command =

Video game by Swedish studio Data Realms

- Title screen of Cortex Command
- Developer: Data Realms
- Publisher: Data Realms
- Director: Daniel Tabár
- Composer: Danny Baranowsky
- Platforms: Windows, Mac OS X, Linux
- Release: Windows, Mac OS X 28 September 2012; Linux; 7 October 2012
- Genre: Action
- Modes: Single-player, Multiplayer

Cortex Command is a two-dimensional side-scrolling action game developed by Swedish studio Data Realms since 2001.

== Gameplay ==
Cortex Command screenshot.

The player takes the role of a stationary or mobile "brain", which can take control of other purchased units in order to accomplish objectives. Missions range from tasks such as retrieving a control chip in a cave filled with zombies to defending the brain from attack. As the brain is weak, the player must manage his resources carefully, protecting the brain, mining gold and fighting off enemies.

The game includes the ability for players to create mods (additions and changes to the game) with the built in Lua programming applet and simple scripting.

== Development ==
The game engine was designed and built by Dan Tabár, using several open-source libraries. The GUI was built by Jason Boettcher, the artwork is by Arne Niklas Jansson, and the macOS port is by Chris Kruger, while the Linux port was developed by Jesus Higueras.

The game was first released as an open beta and was later released for purchase with a time-limited demo version available as well.

As of May 2008, the game was described as being in development for approximately seven years, with Dan Tabár quitting his job in mid-2006 to work full-time on the project. No versions for game consoles were produced. The game allows several components to be modified using Lua and INI files, such as Scenes (or levels), Actors, Weapons, and more. Influences for the game include the X-COM: UFO Defense series.

On 28 September 2012 the game was finally released in version 1.0 for Windows and Mac OS X via Steam and for Linux on 7 October.

In July 2019 the source code was released as open source software under the AGPL-3.0-only software license on GitHub.

The game's soundtrack was composed by Danny Baranowsky. The intro theme was composed by Robert Stjärnström and Jonas Rörling from Machinae Supremacy.

== Setting ==
Despite the fact that the main story has been scrapped, Cortex Command does have some background lore. Sometime in the mid-to-far future after humanity suffered a war brought on by a religious group, Brain transplant and life support technology was developed to make space travel more feasible. This leads to humans making contact with alien life forms, and founding Free Trade. Free Trade is one of the biggest if not the biggest corporations in the whole Orion Spur. But humanity doesn't stop there, despite humanity having long abandoned their bodies, they still kept the stubborn will to fight. With contracting being open to the highest bidder, prospectors fight on earth-like planets with rich gold deposits, while being supplied by companies like Alchiral or Free Trade.

== Reception ==
The control system for the unfinished version of the game has been described as "too fiddly to be considered entertaining" in 2007. Others described the game as requiring patience, asking players to "take [their] time and experiment". The game has been compared to other games in the genre, such as GunBound and Worms. Positive reviews praise the detailed physics, as well as the chaotic gameplay.

Cortex Command was the Indie Games Game of the Month for April 2008.

Cortex Command won the Audience Award and Technical Excellence award at the 2009 Independent Games Festival.
