= Phantom Brigade =

2020 turn-based tactics video game

- Developer: Brace Yourself Games
- Engine: Unity
- Platform: Windows
- Release: February 28, 2023
- Genre: Turn-based tactics
- Mode: Single-player

Phantom Brigade is a turn-based tactics video game originally developed by Tetragon Works, but currently being developed by Brace Yourself Games after they acquired the indie studio. Initially in early access on Epic Games Store since November 2020, the full game was released on February 28, 2023.

== Gameplay ==
The player commands a squad of mechs with a secret prototype weapon that lets them see briefly into the future, showing them the time and direction which enemies move or attack based on the player's actions in the previous round. The game plays out in a semi-real-time manner with turns being separated into segments of five seconds each. The player can predict what happens during these turns and set up moves that then play out in real time.

This mechanic is not only important to keeping troops alive, but also for planning lines of fire to prevent damaging civilian buildings, avoid friendly fire, and mitigating collisions between units which costs them actions for that turn as well as damaging them. Once a turn has been executed and played out, players can use a replay feature to potentially pick up on mistakes or overlooked details. Player objectives can range from destroying enemies and fortifications to intercepting supplies and destroying as many buildings as possible.

After a battle, players can scavenge fallen enemies for parts to upgrade and repair their own units. Outside of combat, players must also manage the wellbeing of their pilots, the Brigade's relations with the civilian populace, and look for ways to obtain further resources to improve their base and capabilities. The players can also build new mechs and recruit both new and seasoned pilots to replace combat losses or expand the ranks: pilots even have different classes that give them specialities with different equipment and tactics.

== Setting ==
Phantom Brigade takes place in the late 20th century on an alternate Earth where the Kellwasser event was caused by the Moon's orbit destabilizing, shattering into a planetary ring around Earth and bombarding the planet with meteorites, leaving the surface inhospitable until the Palocene. Even in the modern day, leftover orbital debris renders space programs impossible.

In the Northern Impact Circuit (resembling Northern Europe), conflict brews between the Fyrland Republic, a prosperous democracy rich in natural resources and focused on social welfare and scientific advancement, and its eastern neighbor, the Kaskad Dominion, a triad-led, expansionist oligarchy with a formidable military. Abundant Helium-3 isotopes left by the Impact have replaced hydrocarbons as the world's primary energy resource; Kaskad, while a leading isotope refiner, has minimal reserves, and its seizure of disputed territories has put it under economic pressure, driving widespread unemployment and poverty. In 1992 SE, with isotopes dwindling, Kaskad invades Fyrland to acquire its resources and technology, easily wiping out most of the Fyrland Defense Service in a coordinated attack. The scattered FDS remnants dissolve into the beleaguered Fyrland Freedom Forces, or "3F" and bide their time for three years of occupation, waiting for the right moment to fight back,

While vastly outnumbered and outgunned, the 3F has a key advantage over Kaskad: the FDS's prototype "Predictor" technology capable of simulated tactical precognition, allowing equipped troops to move, fight, position, evade, and plan with uncanny efficiency. In 1995, the 3F gives its best troops, the "Phantom Brigade" with Predictors to begin striking at Kaskad's forces. Seizing a mobile base crawler, the Brigade's rapid success rallies the resistance and they drive the occupiers from the outer provinces, seizing the passage through the western mountains, and fighting their way east across the country.

== Development ==
The game was first announced at PAX West 2017.

The game's developers decided that the game would not be fully turn-based and play out in real time, in order to "capture that energy you get in a mech anime [...] but have that actually be the gameplay", according to the game's creative lead and designer, Adelaide Jenkins. She stated that while she found games like Front Mission 4 to be "hype" in their cutscenes, the gameplay was "very much traditional turn-based". The game features procedural damage for both the environment and mechs (based on direction).

== Reception ==
Luke Plunkett of Kotaku compared the game to a hybrid of XCOM and MechWarrior Tactics, saying that it "looks amazing" and that he was "excited to see how this giant mechanical ballet looks after a few more months". Mike Williams of USgamer stated that he initially compared the game to Front Mission due to its turn-based gameplay, a comparison that the developers agreed with. Saying that "god dammit, I want more mech strategy games", he called Phantom Brigade the highlight of the PAX West 2019 show. Alex Connolly of Wargamer.com called the game "what we've all been pining for since Square Enix dropped the ball by a) not officially releasing Front Mission 5: Scars of the War in the West and b) allowing Front Mission Evolved to be, well, Front Mission Evolved".
