= Zero Wing =

1989 video game

- Japanese arcade flyer
- Developer: Toaplan
- Publishers: Namco: Arcade; JP: Namco; NA: Williams Electronics Mega Drive; JP: Toaplan; EU: Sega CD-ROM² Naxat Soft
- Producer: Toshiaki Ōta
- Designers: Sanae Nitō; Yuko Tataka
- Programmers: Hiroaki Furukawa; Tatsuya Uemura
- Artists: Miho Hayashi; Naoki Ogiwara; Shintarō Nakaoka
- Composers: Masahiro Yuge; Tatsuya Uemura; Toshiaki Tomizawa
- Engine: Hellfire
- Platforms: Arcade, Mega Drive, PC Engine CD-ROM²
- Release: Arcade: JP: October 1989; NA: April 1990; Mega Drive: JP: 31 May 1991; EU: May 1992; CD-ROM²: JP: 18 September 1992
- Genre: Scrolling shooter
- Modes: Single-player, multiplayer

Zero Wing (Note: Japanese: ゼロウィング, Hepburn: Zero Wingu) is a 1989 horizontally scrolling shooter video game developed by Toaplan and published by Namco for arcades. It was released in North America by Williams Electronics. Controlling the ZIG space fighter craft, players assume the role of protagonist Trent in a last-ditch effort to overthrow the alien space pirate organization CATS (Abigor in the PC Engine version). It was the eighth shoot 'em up game from Toaplan, and their fourteenth video game overall.

Headed by development chief Toshiaki Ōta, Zero Wing was created by most of the same team that previously worked on several projects at Toaplan, initially starting as a project not intended for commercial release but to train new recruits before being ultimately released to the market. The game was later ported to other platforms, each one featuring several changes or additions compared with the original version.

Zero Wing enjoyed a degree of success in arcades and its home conversions were met with mostly positive reception from critics. The European Mega Drive version later gained renewed popularity due to the "All your base are belong to us" internet meme, which plays off the badly translated introductory cutscene. The rights to the title are owned by Tatsujin, a Japanese company formed by Masahiro Yuge. The Mega Drive version was later released in North America by independent publisher Retro-Bit in 2020 as well as the Nintendo Classics service.

== Gameplay ==
Arcade screenshot

Zero Wing is a science fiction-themed side-scrolling shooter similar to Hellfire, where players assume the role of Trent taking control of the ZIG space fighter craft through eight increasingly difficult levels, each with a boss at the end that must be fought before progressing any further, in a last-ditch effort to overthrow the alien cyborg CATS as the main objective. As far as side-scrolling shooters go, the title initially appears to be very standard, as players control their craft over a constantly scrolling background and the scenery never stops moving until the stage boss is reached.

A unique gameplay feature is the "Seizer Beam" system; during gameplay, players can grab certain enemies and hold them as shield against enemy fire or launch them against enemies. There are three types of weapons in the game that can be switched between after destroying incoming carriers by picking up a color-changing item ranging from the "Red Cannon" shot, the "Blue Laser" and the "Green Homing" missiles. Each weapon can be upgraded by picking up an item of the same color. Other items can also be grabbed along the way such as speed increasers, 1UPs and a bomb module capable of obliterating any enemy caught within its blast radius that can also be triggered after taking enemy hits.

Depending on the settings in the arcade version, the title uses either a checkpoint system in which a downed single player will start off at the beginning of the checkpoint they managed to reach before dying, or a respawn system where their ship immediately starts at the location where they died. Getting hit by enemy fire or colliding against solid stage obstacles will result in losing a life, as well as a penalty of decreasing the ship's firepower and speed to his original state and once all lives are lost, the game is over unless the players insert more credits into the arcade machine to continue playing. The game loops back to the first stage after completing the last stage as with previous titles from Toaplan, with each one increasing the difficulty and enemies fire denser bullet patterns as well as spawning extra bullets when destroyed.

== Synopsis ==
The backstory of Zero Wing varies between each version, but the plot within the game itself remains consistent. Set in 2101, the game follows the signing of a peace treaty between the United Nations (also translated as the Milky Way Federation) and CATS, a space pirate organization, who later breaks the covenant and takes control of the Japanese/Federation space colonies. The protagonist, Trent, pilots a ZIG spacecraft that managed to escape from a mothership destroyed by a representative of CATS. His aim is to defeat enemy forces, avenge the mothership and its crew, and liberate Earth.

However, in the PC Engine version, the story is different. CATS is replaced by an organization called Abigor, led by a man named Ludwig and his right-hand woman, Seiren. Abigor attacks the Galactic Federation, and the ZIG, piloted by Masato Tachibana, is sent to repel them. It is eventually revealed that the Federation dispatcher's sister, Airen, who had been working as an undercover spy to alert the Federation about Abigor's attack, is arrested by Seiren and turned over to Ludwig. After Ludwig chooses to spare Airen's life, Tachibana communicates with Ludwig, who challenges him to a battle with the condition that Airen will be returned if Tachibana wins. Tachibana accepts and destroys Ludwig's ship, after which Ludwig relinquishes Airen before committing suicide. Airen and Tachibana then celebrate their victory before returning to Earth offscreen.

== Development ==
Zero Wing was created by most of the same team that previously worked on several projects at Toaplan, with members of the development staff recounting its history through various Japanese publications. Toshiaki Ōta was at the helm as development chief and also served as programmer alongside Hiroaki Furukawa and Tatsuya Uemura. Uemura also acted as composer along with Masahiro Yuge and Toshiaki Tomizawa. Artists Miho Hayashi, Naoki Ogiwara and Shintarō Nakaoka created the artwork while Sanae Nitō and Yuko Tataka served as character designers.

Uemura stated that Zero Wing originally started as a project not intended for commercial launch to train new recruits at Toaplan, handling training for new hires while using his work and engine from Hellfire before ultimately deciding with releasing the game to the market, which made it a more practical learning experience for the new developers. Uemura, however, felt that both stage design and characters were "cobbled together", leading the game's world being "kind of a mess" and he also stated the project turned into a "battle royale", as staff from both Hellfire and Truxton were mixed with the new recruits. Sound also proved to be very divisive as Uemura, Yuge and Tomizawa wrote several songs for the game with their own individual styles, though Uemura claimed this was due to dividing the work, while Yuge stated he would go to rest and drink after being stuck when composing for the title during work hours. Due to being a training project, Uemura stated that the team had freedom to "just fool around" and several features were integrated into the title such as warps, which was taken from Slap Fight. Uemura also revealed that the reason for enemies spawning suicide bullets during loops of higher difficulty was in response to hardware limitations regarding sprites. Both the single-player and co-op versions were also planned from the beginning of development due to pressure to make two-player games at the time. The alien Pipiru was designed by Ogiwara, though Uemura claimed such character was not planned.

The Mega Drive version of Zero Wing was created by the same staff responsible for the arcade version, with Uemura overseeing development in-house. Both Uemura and Tataka have stated that working with the Mega Drive proved to be difficult due to several restrictions imposed by the hardware. According to both Uemura and Yuge, the poor English translation of the Mega Drive version was handled by a member of Toaplan in charge of export and overseas business whose English was "really terrible". The Mega Drive port features arranged music by Noriyuki Iwadare. The PC Engine CD-ROM² version was outsourced by an "acquaintance" from defunct developer Orca, with Uemura handling sound.

To expand the plot, the Mega Drive version added an introductory sequence to the game. This introduction does not appear in the arcade original nor in the PC Engine CD-ROM² versions; rather, a different intro takes place with a blue-windowed ZIG. The PC Engine CD-ROM² also added two new levels: 5th (Deeva) and 10th (Vacura).

== Release ==
Zero Wing was first released in arcades in October 1989 by Namco in Japan, and then by Williams Electronics for North America in April 1990. In 1989, an album containing music from the title was co-published exclusively in Japan by Scitron and Pony Canyon.

Zero Wing was first ported to the Mega Drive by Toaplan and was first published in Japan on 31 May 1991 and later in Europe by Sega in May 1992. Despite never being released in North America, this version is playable on American Sega Genesis consoles; like most early titles, it had no region protection, nor had the European release been PAL-optimized. The game was later converted to the PC Engine CD-ROM² add-on and published exclusively in Japan by Naxat Soft on 18 September 1992.

The Mega Drive port was later released in North America by independent publisher Retro-Bit in 2020. Zero Wing was included as part of the Toaplan Arcade 1 compilation for Evercade, released in December 2022. Zero Wing was re-released on the Nintendo Classics service in June 2022.

Bitwave Games and Tatsujin jointly released Zero Wing on Steam and GOG.com in February 2023, both as a standalone title and as a game bundle with Twin Cobra, Truxton, and Out Zone. The Steam version includes several game enhancements, such as an updated graphics, rewind option, achievements, online leaderboards, sidebar indicators, and a new Very Easy mode.

== Reception ==
Reception
Review scores
Publication	Scores	
Publication	Sega Mega Drive	PC Engine CD-ROM²
Beep! Mega Drive	32/40	—N/a
Computer and Video Games	93%	—N/a
Famitsu	28/40	21/40
Games-X	92%	—N/a
Gekkan PC Engine	—N/a	78/100
Génération 4	81%	—N/a
Hippon Super!	60/100	—N/a
HobbyConsolas	86/100	—N/a
HonestGamers	2/5	—N/a
Joypad	90%	68%
Joystick	86%	78%
Marukatsu PC Engine	—N/a	25/40
Mean Machines	91%	—N/a
Mega	70%	—N/a
Mega Drive Advanced Gaming	72%	—N/a
Mega Drive Fan	19.70/30	—N/a
Mega Force	80%	—N/a
MegaTech	82%	—N/a
PC Engine Fan	—N/a	19.72/30
Play Time	68%	—N/a
Player One	79%	—N/a
Power Play	67%	—N/a
Sega Force	86%	—N/a
Sega Power	5/5; 88%	—N/a
Sega Pro	78%	—N/a
Supersonic	85%	—N/a
Tilt	16/20	—N/a
Video Games	67%	—N/a

In Japan, Game Machine listed Zero Wing as the fourth most successful table arcade unit of November 1989, outperforming titles such as Jitsuryoku!! Pro Yakyū and U.N. Squadron.

The game received a positive critical reception upon release. Computer and Video Games scored it 93%, including ratings of 92% for graphics, 93% for sound, 90% for playability, and 89% for lastability. They praised "the great intro sequence", "super-smooth gameplay, beautifully defined graphics, rocking sound track, amazing explosions and incredible end-of-level bosses", concluding that it is "the game which breaths (sic) new life into shoot 'em ups on the Megadrive". Mean Machines scored it 91%, including ratings of 92% for presentation and graphics, 88% for sound, 90% for playability, and 89% for lastability. They praised the "ace" opening sequence, "detailed" graphics, "real good" music, and skill-based gameplay, and called it one of the best games for Mega Drive. Sega Force scored it 86%, including ratings of 84% for presentation, 89% for visuals, 83% for sound, 89% for playability, and 82% for lastability. They praised the "animated intro" sequence, "smart" graphics, "up-beat Jap tune" music, and the accessible but "highly involved" gameplay, concluding that it is "almost as good as Hellfire" but "not quite".

Complex ranked Zero Wing 98th on their list of "The 100 Best Sega Genesis Games".

== Legacy ==
Zero Wing was the last side-scrolling shoot 'em up title to be developed by Toaplan, as the developers believed they did not know how to make a side-scrolling shooter interesting, despite positive reception from players.

Zero Wing is one of the most widely-known examples of poor linguistic translation in video games. Translations were handled internally by the design team, not a professional translator. In 1999, the introduction cutscene for the Sega Mega Drive version of Zero Wing was re-discovered, culminating in the wildly popular "All your base are belong to us" Internet meme.

Zero Wing is also of interest in the field of translation studies in the context of its multiple endings. As noted by Clyde Mandelin, who reverse engineered the original game, while the English-language version had three different post-credit endings, the Japanese version had thirty-five. Many of those endings referenced then-current Japanese popular culture in ways that would have been hard to translate across cultures, and suggests that the text was written by someone who grew up in the 1960s or 1970s.

In more recent years, the rights to Zero Wing and many other IPs from Toaplan are now owned by Tatsujin, a company named after Truxton's Japanese title that was founded in 2017 by former Toaplan employee Masahiro Yuge, and is part of Embracer Group since 2022.
