= Gravity Hook =

2008 video game

- Title screen
- Publisher(s): Semi Secret Software
- Designer(s): Adam Saltsman
- Platform(s): Web browser, iOS
- Release: Browser; August 2008; Gravity Hook HD; WW: March 1, 2010 (Browser); WW: July 29, 2010 (iOS)
- Genre(s): Action (Vertical scroller)
- Mode(s): Single-player

Gravity Hook is a vertically scrolling video game designed by Adam Saltsman and published by Semi Secret Software for web browsers in 2008. The game was remade into Gravity Hook HD and released for both browsers and iOS in 2010.

== Gameplay ==
In this game the player attempts to use a futuristic grappling hook to climb out of an underground, secret base in order to reach the surface.

== Reception ==
Reception

Aggregate score
Aggregator	Score
Metacritic	67/100

Review scores
Publication	Score
The A.V. Club	A−
GamePro	4/5 stars
Gamezebo	4/5 stars
Pocket Gamer	3.5/5 stars

The iOS version received "average" reviews according to the review aggregation website Metacritic.
