= Cadence of Hyrule =

2019 video game

- Icon artwork, featuring from left to right, Link, Cadence, and Zelda, with Octavo above them
- Developer: Brace Yourself Games
- Publisher: Nintendo: JP: Spike Chunsoft
- Directors: Ryan Clark; Toshihisa Nikaido
- Producer: Makoto Isobe
- Designers: Oliver Trujillo; Ryan Clark
- Programmers: Stephen Kiazyk; Alain Carter; Oliver Trujillo
- Artists: Paul Veer; Lucas Carvalho; Ted Martens; Tyriq Plummer
- Writers: Ryan Clark; Oliver Trujillo; Kramer Solinsky; Toshihisa Nikaido
- Composer: Danny Baranowsky
- Series: Crypt of the NecroDancer; The Legend of Zelda
- Platform: Nintendo Switch
- Release: June 13, 2019
- Genres: Roguelike, rhythm
- Modes: Single-player, multiplayer

Cadence of Hyrule: Crypt of the NecroDancer Featuring The Legend of Zelda (Note: Japanese: ケイデンス・オブ・ハイラル: クリプト・オブ・ネクロダンサー Feat. ゼルダの伝説, Hepburn: Cadence of Hyrule: Crypt of NecroDancer Feat. Zelda no Densetsu) is a 2019 roguelike rhythm game developed by Brace Yourself Games and published by Nintendo for the Nintendo Switch. The game is a crossover between Crypt of the NecroDancer and Nintendo's The Legend of Zelda series, combining the rhythm-based movement and fighting mechanics with elements reminiscent of earlier games in the Zelda franchise. The game was released on June 13, 2019 to generally positive reviews from critics.

== Gameplay ==
Cadence of Hyrule combines the rhythm-based gameplay of Crypt of the NecroDancer with settings, characters, and music from The Legend of Zelda series. Players play the majority of the game as either Link or Princess Zelda, with other characters such as NecroDancer protagonist Cadence becoming unlocked by progressing through the game or completing certain quests, each with their own unique abilities. Players venture across the overworld, composed of predefined regions and map layouts related to Zelda lore such as Hyrule Castle or Death Mountain, but whose relative placement is procedurally generated for each new save file. This map remains the same throughout an entire game, but certain dungeons such as those found in temples will be randomly generated every time they are visited. Whenever enemies are in an area, the player is required to move and attack in time to the music using the directional buttons, with bonus multipliers and extra rewards available for maintaining the beat. Throughout the game, the player can find or purchase weapons and equipment, such as shovels for digging through dirt or torches that can reveal the contents of chests, as well as recurring Zelda items such as bows, bombs, and hook shots.

Partially carrying over roguelike elements from NecroDancer, the player will lose amassed rupees and temporary items if they lose all of their health. Diamonds, which can be found in dungeons or earned by defeating every enemy in an area, are retained even if the player gets a game over. Players can activate Sheikah Stones in certain areas, which they can either fast travel to or respawn from following a death. The game features optional modes such as "fixed-beat mode", which removes the need to play to the music, and permadeath mode, which challenges players to play through the campaign without dying once. The game can also be played co-operatively with a second player on the same Switch unit with each player using one Joy-Con to move.

== Plot ==
In the Kingdom of Hyrule, a mysterious man named Octavo uses a magical lute to put Hyrule's king, as well as Link and Zelda, to sleep, before using the Triforce of Power to turn his Lute into a Golden Lute. In this time of need, Cadence is mysteriously transported to Hyrule by the Triforce and manages to wake up Link and Zelda. While Cadence goes off to try to find a way home, Link and Zelda travel across Hyrule to find and defeat Octavo's four champions, who each possess enchanted instruments containing musical power. After Link and Zelda, soon rejoined by Cadence, obtain the instruments and enter Hyrule Castle, Octavo reveals that he and his champions were meant to be used to battle against Ganon, who will take over Hyrule in the future. Finding himself defeated, Octavo opens a portal into the future, where Link, Zelda, and Cadence confront Ganon and combine their forces to defeat him. With help from the Golden Lute, Link and Zelda use the power of the Triforce to try and send Cadence back to her own world.

== Development ==
Cadence of Hyrule was developed by Brace Yourself Games and directed by Crypt of the NecroDancer creator Ryan Clark. It began development when Clark approached Nintendo to ask permission to use The Legend of Zelda content as DLC for the Nintendo Switch port of the game. Clark stated that a mutual interest in the idea grew faster than they were expecting. The project eventually evolved into a new crossover title. The project was described as a new entry in the Crypt of the NecroDancer series, while also taking care to make sure it works as a Legend of Zelda game as well. Clark stated that he was excited to work with The Legend of Zelda soundtrack, due to the series' compositions as well as the use of instruments as gameplay mechanics.

Composer Danny Baranowsky provides the 25-song soundtrack, which remixes several classic Zelda songs. Part of the pixel art style for the game was developed by members of the Sonic Mania art team.

The game was announced in March 2019, at the end of a Nintendo Direct "Nindies" showcase, and garnered immediate attention for being a rare instance of Nintendo allowing a small independent developer to make use of its intellectual property, as most Nintendo collaborations of this nature had previously been with larger third-party developers such as Ubisoft, Atlus, and Capcom. The game released on June 13.

Free downloadable content (DLC) for the game was added on December 18 the same year. It includes additional story-based content, with Octavo as the playable character, and a Dungeons mode. Three additional paid DLC were released in 2020, and can be purchased individually or as part of a Season Pass. The first, released on July 20, adds five playable characters to the game, each with their own special moves and attacks, including Impa, Shadow Link and Shadow Zelda from The Legend of Zelda, and Aria and Frederick from Crypt of the Necrodancer. The second, released on August 31, is a pack containing additional music tracks for the game arranged by Jules "FamilyJules" Conroy, Alex "A_Rival" Esquivel, and Chipzel. The final DLC, released on September 23, is a new adventure titled "Symphony of the Mask", starring the Skull Kid from The Legend of Zelda: Majora's Mask, which includes new maps, modes, and music. Additionally, a physical version of the game that includes all DLC was released on October 23.

== Reception ==
Reception

Aggregate scores
| Aggregator | Score |
|---|---|
| Metacritic | 85/100 |
| OpenCritic | 94% recommend (Note: Based on 63 reviews.) |

Review scores
| Publication | Score |
|---|---|
| Destructoid | 9.5/10 |
| Game Informer | 7.75/10 |
| GameRevolution | 4.5/5 |
| GameSpot | 8/10 |
| IGN | 8.8/10 |
| Jeuxvideo.com | 17/20 |
| Nintendo Life | 9/10 |
| Nintendo World Report | 9.5/10 |
| RPGamer | 4/5 |
| Shacknews | 9/10 |
| USgamer | 4.5/5 |

Cadence of Hyrule received "generally favorable reviews" according to review aggregator Metacritic.

The Verge called the style of the game a "welcome shot of retro charm" when compared to The Legend of Zelda: Breath of the Wild. The Guardian enjoyed the way music factored into every aspect of the game, saying that "instead of wearing thin, the rhythm-based gimmick enhances everything it touches". Eurogamer praised the way it adapted Zelda to Crypt's gameplay, saying that "it makes up for its smallish footprint with its sheer delight in discovery as you wander about, everything half familiar, every ultimately a surprise".

Polygon liked the soundtrack, composed of remixes of traditional Zelda themes, commenting that "Baranowsky makes these classics his own without distracting from the game itself". Destructoid wrote that it managed to advance the Crypt formula by adding elements from Zelda and that "it takes the best parts of Crypt of the NecroDancer and makes them more accessible". While criticizing the non-use of HD Rumble, Nintendo Life enjoyed the co-op mode.

Cadence of Hyrule was the best-selling digital Nintendo Switch game during its first week of release in Japan. The physical version sold 1,539 copies within its first week on sale in Japan, making it the twenty-fourth bestselling retail game of the week in the country. It was also the bestselling digital Nintendo Switch game during the month of June 2019 in Europe.

=== Awards ===
| Year | Award | Category | Result | Ref. |
|---|---|---|---|---|
| 2019 | 2019 Golden Joystick Awards | Best Audio | Nominated | |
| 2019 | 2019 Golden Joystick Awards | Nintendo Game of the Year | Nominated | |
| 2019 | The Game Awards 2019 | Best Score/Music | Nominated | |
| 2020 | NAVGTR Awards | Game, Music or Performance-Based | Won | |
| 2020 | 18th Annual G.A.N.G. Awards | G.A.N.G. / MAGFest People's Choice Award | Won | |
