= Link (The Legend of Zelda) =

Protagonist of The Legend of Zelda

- The Legend of Zelda character
- Various incarnations of Link, as seen in The Legend of Zelda: Hyrule Historia
- First game: The Legend of Zelda (1986)
- Created by: Shigeru Miyamoto
- Designed by: Shigeru Miyamoto
- Voiced by: Child: Fujiko Takimoto (Ocarina of Time, Majora's Mask, Super Smash Bros. Melee, Hyrule Warriors, Super Smash Bros. Ultimate); Sachi Matsumoto (The Wind Waker, Four Swords Adventures, Phantom Hourglass, Super Smash Bros. Brawl, (Note: Toon Link) Super Smash Bros. for Nintendo 3DS and Wii U, Super Smash Bros. Ultimate); Yūki Kodaira (Spirit Tracks); Mitsuki Saiga (A Link Between Worlds, Link's Awakening, Echoes of Wisdom); Serika Hiromatsu (Ocarina of Time (2026)); Adult: Nobuyuki Hiyama (Ocarina of Time, Super Smash Bros., Majora's Mask, (Note: Fierce Deity Link while wearing the obtainable Fierce Deity Mask.) Super Smash Bros. Melee, Soulcalibur II); Akira Sasanuma (Twilight Princess, Link's Crossbow Training, Super Smash Bros. Brawl, Super Smash Bros. for Nintendo 3DS and Wii U); Takashi Ōhara (Skyward Sword, Mario Kart 8); Yūki Kaji (Hyrule Warriors); Kengo Takanashi (Breath of the Wild, Super Smash Bros. Ultimate, Age of Calamity, Tears of the Kingdom); Shou Komura (Ocarina of Time (2026)); Other: Jonathan Potts (TV series and Captain N); Jeffrey Rath (Link: The Faces of Evil and Zelda: The Wand of Gamelon); Caitlyn Bairstow (Cadence of Hyrule)
- Portrayed by: Benjamin Evan Ainsworth (2027 film)

In-universe information
- Race: Hylian
- Weapon: Swords, Shields, Spears, etc.. Mainly user of Master Sword
- Origin: Hyrule

Link (Note: Japanese: リンク, Hepburn: Rinku) is a character and the main protagonist of Nintendo's video game franchise The Legend of Zelda. He was created by Japanese video game designer Shigeru Miyamoto. Link was introduced as the hero of the original The Legend of Zelda video game in 1986 and has appeared in a total of 21 entries in the series, as well as a number of spin-offs. Common elements in the series include Link travelling through Hyrule whilst exploring dungeons, battling creatures, and solving puzzles until he eventually defeats the series' primary antagonist, Ganon, and saves Princess Zelda.

Throughout the series, Link has made multiple appearances in a variety of incarnations, but has been traditionally depicted in his signature green cap and tunic wielding a sword and shield. He has appeared as both a child and adult of the elf-like Hylian race. Within Zelda mythology, Link is the soul of a legendary hero that throughout history is reincarnated within a seemingly ordinary young boy or young man whenever evil arises. To defeat Ganon, Link usually obtains the mystical Master Sword or a similar legendary weapon obtained after completing many trials.

In addition to the main series, Link has appeared in other Nintendo media, including merchandise, comics and manga, and an animated television series. He is a prominent character in various spin-off games, including Hyrule Warriors, Cadence of Hyrule, Hyrule Warriors: Age of Calamity, and Hyrule Warriors: Age of Imprisonment. He has appeared in several other game franchises, including the Super Smash Bros. series, SoulCalibur II, and Mario Kart 8. He has also been referenced in other games, such as The Elder Scrolls V: Skyrim.

Alongside fellow Nintendo character Mario, Link is one of the most recognisable characters in the video game industry. He has been instrumental in the establishment of the role-playing video game genre as the protagonist of the series, which has influenced numerous other video games with its concepts of open world and nonlinear gameplay. According to Guinness World Records, Link is the most critically acclaimed video game playable character and the most ubiquitous action-adventure video game character. He was recognised by the Guinness World Records Gamer's Edition as the second best video game character after Mario. Critics have named him as one of the greatest and most influential video game characters of all time.

== Concept and creation ==
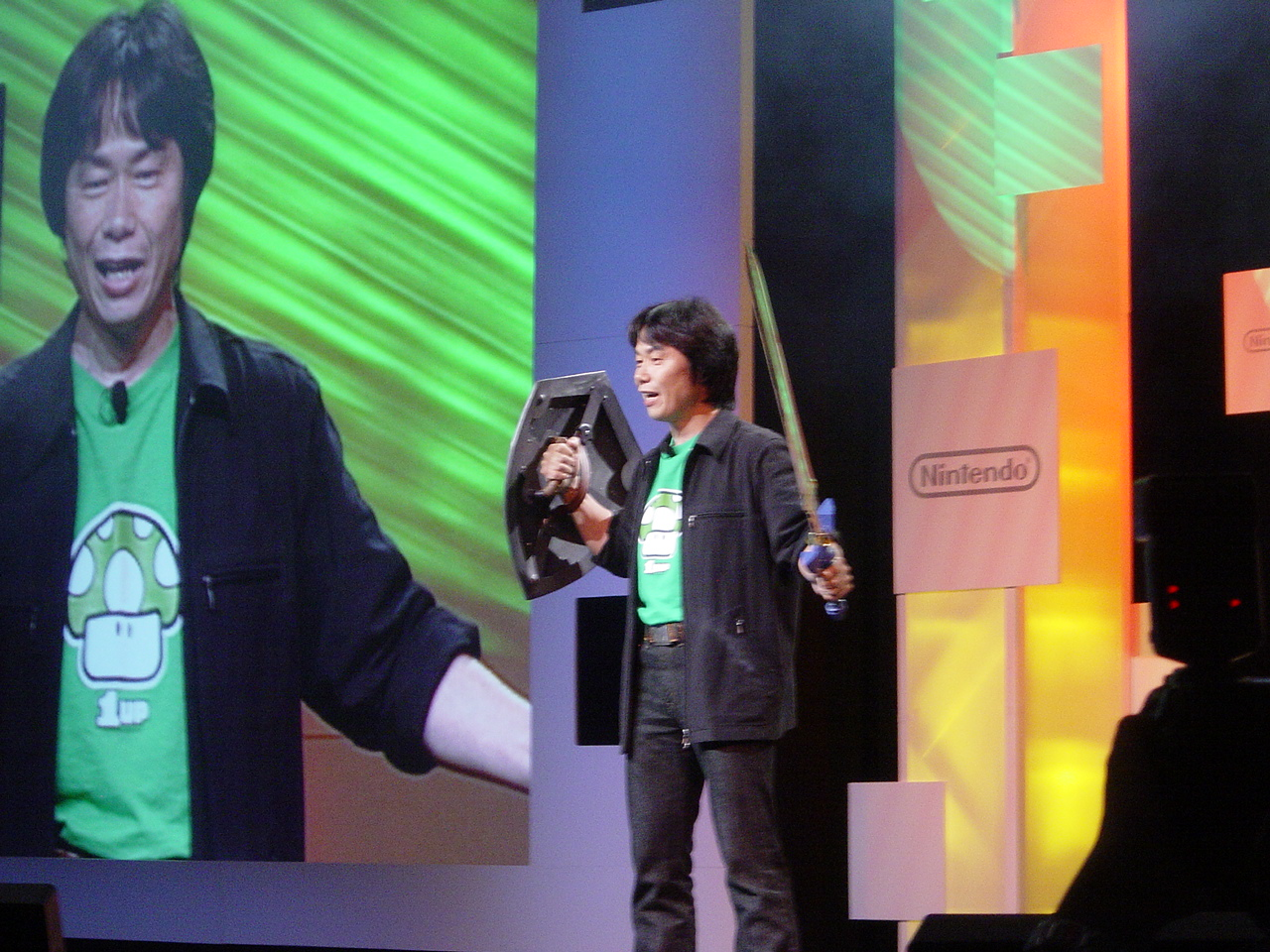
Shigeru Miyamoto, creator of Link, holding replicas of the character's signature Master Sword and shield at Electronic Entertainment Expo 2004

=== Characterisation ===
Link's creator, Shigeru Miyamoto, said that his concept of The Legend of Zelda was based on his childhood memories as well as books and movies that he and video game designer Takashi Tezuka had enjoyed, notably J. R. R. Tolkien's The Lord of the Rings. Miyamoto wanted people to have the opportunity to be heroes and created Link as a normal boy, with "a destiny to fight great evil". On the origin of the character's name, Miyamoto said: "Link's name comes from the fact that originally, the fragments of the Triforce were supposed to be electronic chips. The game was to be set in both the past and the future and as the main character would travel between both and be the link between them, they called him Link". In the Nintendo book Hyrule Historia he said that the character is named Link because he, "connects people together" and, "he was supposed to spread the scattered energy of the world through the ages".

Link is the playable character who appears in every installment of The Legend of Zelda series. Although there are many iterations of Link, each with a similar role and appearance, they are not physically the same individual. The series spans thousands of years in Hyrule's history across The Legend of Zelda fictional timeline, so that each version of the character is a different Link, sometimes being a descendant of earlier incarnations or a spiritual reincarnation. In some games, such as Ocarina of Time and Majora's Mask, the same version appears in both, continuing that character's individual story. Skyward Sword, which was released in 2011, explained Link's incarnations by creating an origin story, in which the antagonist Demon King Demise curses the hero to be caught in an endless cycle of defeating evil in the form of Ganondorf.

As no canonical game in The Legend of Zelda series to date has contained substantial spoken dialogue for Link, he is mostly a silent protagonist, but not a mute character (except in The Legend of Zelda: Echoes of Wisdom, where he is mute). His voice acting consists only of grunts, battle cries, and other sounds, although in The Wind Waker, he can be heard saying, "Come on!" Despite lacking spoken dialogue, Link interacts with other characters through visual responses, such as nodding or shaking his head, reactions from side characters, or game text that expresses his dialogue. Series producer, Eiji Aonuma explained that a core aspect of Link's design is that players need to relate to him and put themselves in his shoes, while still playing as themselves. Link is silent to allow the player to interpret how he sounds, make decisions for the character and become the hero.

=== Character design ===
Link's character design has been consistent, but it has evolved across the series. His original design was created by Miyamoto while his sprite design was created by Tezuka. In an interview with Gamekult, Miyamoto said that he used the Disney character Peter Pan as a source of inspiration when creating Link in order to make the character recognisable. Due to the limited capabilities of the technology at the time, the development team was only able to use three colours and chose green as Link's signature colour, as the first game was mainly set within a forest environment. Link's sword and shield, long cap and ears were all created to make the character easily distinguishable. For Ocarina of Time, Miyamoto said that the team started by designing a grown-up model followed by a child model, but realised that both could be used in the game, "to tell the story of a boy growing up". Link's adult appearance in Ocarina of Time was designed with the aim of making him more handsome, influenced by developer Yoshiaki Koizumi's wife declaring, "all of Nintendo's characters have funny noses; don't you have any handsome ones?" Nintendo illustrator Yusuke Nakano said that Link's design in Ocarina of Time was based on a well-known American actor at the time of the game's development.

Prior to The Wind Waker a cartoon version of Link was created by graphic designer Yoshiki Haruhana as a way to evolve the series, which was well received by the development team. According to designer Satoru Takizawa, this oversized anime-inspired design with huge eyes offered a richer variety of expression and provided a better way of representing the puzzles and mechanisms than a more photorealistic design. After many experiments, the development team had decided that cel-shading was the best option for expressing a young, energetic boy. Although the team loved the idea of basing the next Zelda game on a cartoon Link, Aonuma held off presenting it to Miyamoto until later in the game's development. When he did view it, Miyamoto reportedly cringed, believing that the game would not sell, but the team insisted that there was not enough time to develop a realistic art style. Toon Link eventually carved his own identity into the franchise by appearing in multiple entries in the series and being introduced as a playable character in Super Smash Bros. Aonuma said that despite some initial outrage, gamers began to accept Toon Link, so Phantom Hourglass and Spirit Tracks were created with a similar artwork style.

Following the response to The Wind Waker, Nintendo reversed the art style for Twilight Princess in 2006, by depicting Link in a more realistic style with a darker, grittier tone. Nakano and Takizawa stated in The Legend of Zelda: Art and Artifacts that they had planned to design him aged mid-to-late twenties and that he would be well built, but this was rejected because the team expected that fans wanted to see Link as he appeared in Ocarina of Time. Aonuma explained that the design team wanted to express Link as an adult: "The fact that we're seeing Link on horseback and swinging a sword, I think that's one more way in which Link has matured". In Twilight Princess, Link has the ability to transform into a wolf. Aonuma said that the design team considered the animal to be the best representation of a hero and that this function gave the adult version of Link limited human abilities, allowing him to mature over the course of the game.

The Legend of Zelda: Breath of the Wild broke the conventions of Link's design by replacing his signature green hat and tunic.

Link's signature green tunic and cap have evolved over the course of the series. At a Game Developers Conference in San Francisco, Takizawa described the subtle changes made to Link's outfit. For Twilight Princess he, "made the hat long, so it would flap in the wind and move around", but for Skyward Sword, he made it more diminutive and gave it less motion. The release of Breath of the Wild in 2017 broke the conventions of Link's design, notably by the absence of his signature green outfit. Takizawa explained that "as the graphic fidelity has increased it becomes more difficult to make that hat look cool". For Breath of the Wild nearly 100 designs were considered to ensure that Link remained a neutral character. Aonuma commented: "We thought that the iconic green tunic and hat had become expected, so we wanted to mix things up and update his look. Interestingly, though, nobody on the team said, 'Let's make him blue!' It just organically ended up that way".

Link's physical features have also evolved, influenced by trends in masculinity. His handsomeness has been defined by soft, androgynous facial features, a sharp nose and a slight build. His hair has been inspired by the fashion of the era, beginning with a mullet in the 1980s, then followed by blond curtain bangs and pierced ears in the 1990s, moving to choppy, layered side-swept bangs by the release of Twilight Princess. His look was updated in Breath of the Wild to include a ponytail and a wide variety of outfits. Although Link is a male character, Aonuma said that he wanted him to be gender neutral in Ocarina of Time: "I wanted the player to think 'Maybe Link is a boy or a girl'. If you saw Link as a guy, he'd have more of a feminine touch. Or vice versa, if you related to Link as a girl, it was with more of a masculine aspect". For Twilight Princess, he created a more masculine Link, but later decided to return him to a more gender neutral character. He said that Link is definitely male in Breath of the Wild, but wanted to create a character to which anyone could relate.

In multiple entries, Link has a counterpart character called either Shadow Link or Dark Link. This version has different designs; in Zelda II, he has a shadowy appearance, while in Ocarina of Time, he also has red eyes.

=== Portrayal ===
Link has been voiced by eight actors in the series and also voiced in other games: Nobuyuki Hiyama in Ocarina of Time as adult Link, Majora's Mask as Fierce Deity Link, Super Smash Bros., Super Smash Bros. Melee and Soulcalibur II, Fujiko Takimoto in Ocarina of Time as child Link, Majora's Mask, A Link to the Past and Four Swords, and as Young Link in Hyrule Warriors, Super Smash Bros. Melee and Super Smash Bros. Ultimate, Sachi Matsumoto in The Wind Waker, Phantom Hourglass, Four Swords Adventures and as Toon Link in Hyrule Warriors, Super Smash Bros. Brawl and Super Smash Bros. Ultimate, Akira Sasanuma in Twilight Princess, Super Smash Bros. Brawl and Link's Crossbow Training, Yūki Kodaira in Spirit Tracks, Takashi Ōhara in Skyward Sword, Mitsuki Saiga in A Link Between Worlds and Link's Awakening (2019), and Kengo Takanashi in Breath of the Wild, Hyrule Warriors: Age of Calamity, Super Smash Bros. Ultimate and Tears of the Kingdom. In the 2026 remake of Ocarina of Time, child Link is voiced Serika Hiromatsu, and adult Link is voiced by Shou Komura. Link was voiced by Yuki Kaji in Hyrule Warriors. In Cadence of Hyrule, he was voiced by Caitlyn Bairstow. In the cutscenes of the CD-i titles Link: The Faces of Evil and Zelda: The Wand of Gamelon, he was voiced by Jeffrey Rath. On television, Link was voiced by Jonathan Potts in both The Legend of Zelda animated series and Captain N: The Game Master.

== Characteristics ==
Link is the archetypal hero and main protagonist of The Legend of Zelda series. Whenever a great malevolence threatens the Kingdom of Hyrule, typically in the form of Ganon, Link is the counterpart who is destined to fight that evil and restore peace to the people of Hyrule. He begins each game as either a child or adult who is often lazy and unprepared for battle, but develops his skills and experience over the course of the game as the player upgrades his weapons and health. His story varies from game to game, but typically involves a similar thread of solving dungeon puzzles, saving Princess Zelda and defeating Ganon or some other evil. He displays the characteristic traits of the Hylian race, being of humanoid form with elfin features, including pointed ears. Since the first The Legend of Zelda video game, he has been repeatedly depicted wearing his characteristic green cap and tunic and typically wields a sword and shield. Link's age varies across the series, starting the first game at 10 years old and its sequel at 16. In Ocarina of Time, he is initially aged 10 and is aged up to 17 after the game's time shift. In The Wind Waker, Link is 12, whereas in Twilight Princess, Skyward Sword and Breath of the Wild, Link is aged 17 years old.

In the mythology of the series, Link is the reincarnated soul of a hero, chosen by the goddess Hylia to protect the kingdom of Hyrule from Ganon and save Princess Zelda whenever the need arises. He is also the bearer of the Triforce of Courage, one of the three components that combine to form the Triforce, a sacred artefact and symbol of power. The Triforce of Courage symbolises the essence of Link, specifically the courage and curiosity of the player setting out on the adventure. In several Zelda games, Link's main objective is to recover the fragments of the Triforce in order to defeat Ganon.

Although Link can carry an arsenal of weapons, including bows, boomerangs and magic rods, his signature weapon is the Master Sword, a powerful magic sword with the ability to repel evil. Throughout each game, Link is able to obtain various items during his adventures, which the player can then use in gameplay. Many of these objects possess magical properties that bestow specific abilities on Link, such as a magic cape that makes Link invisible when he wears it, or potions that replenish his health. Others have various practical purposes, such as the hookshot, which enables Link to pull items towards him, and bombs for detonating walls. Link has used various musical instruments on his travels, most notably, the Ocarina of Time, which when played is used for teleportation. In Breath of the Wild, Link's key tool is the Sheikah Slate, a handheld tablet featuring various runes that enable him to manipulate the game world. In Tears of the Kingdom Link uses his powers such as Ultrahand, Fuse, and Ascend by replacing his damaged arm with the right arm of Rauru, the first King of Hyrule.

=== Relationships ===
Link's relationships with the other two main characters have been a defining aspect of the series. Ganon, Zelda and Link embody the three pieces of the Triforce, with Ganon representing Power, Zelda representing Wisdom and Link representing Courage. This trinity dictates the enduring relationships of the three characters who are repeatedly reincarnated across the series in an endless battle for good and evil. The nature of Zelda and Link's relationship has been the subject of speculation and remains ambiguous. A romantic relationship was particularly emphasised in an official "romance trailer" for Skyward Sword. In an interview with Game Informer, Aonuma said, "we wanted the player to feel like this is a person who's very important to me, who I need to find. We used that hint of a romance between the two to tug at the heartstrings".

== Appearances ==
=== The Legend of Zelda series ===
Link's first appearance in 2D form in The Legend of Zelda on the NES (1986)

Link made his debut on the Nintendo Entertainment System (NES) in The Legend of Zelda (1986) as an 8-bit 2D character within a flat environment viewed from a top-down perspective. He was depicted as a short, stubby character with brown hair wearing a green cap and tunic. During the game, he meets an old man who offers him a sword and declares "It's dangerous to go alone!". Link must rescue Princess Zelda and the kingdom of Hyrule from the evil prince Ganon, who has stolen the Triforce of Power. He explores 128 areas of Hyrule and nine dungeons, which contain special items that help him to defeat each dungeon boss; he must defeat them all before fighting Ganon.

Link's second outing, Zelda II: The Adventure of Link (1987), depicted him as a slightly taller 2D sprite wearing a similar green outfit. In the production art, his outfit was largely the same, but he wore brown trousers and longer hair. His shield was decorated with a cross, but this was removed in the games that followed. The game switches between top-down exploration and side-scrolling action sequences. Link's combat capability evolved with the ability to stab up and down with his sword while jumping. Experience points gained by defeating enemies enable his health and attack power to be levelled up. A series of magic spells also grant him special abilities, such as extra defence. To complete the adventure, Link must defeat his doppelgänger Dark Link to awaken sleeping Zelda.

A Link to the Past (1991) recreated Link in a 16-bit colour palette for the Super Nintendo Entertainment System, with the unusual characteristic of pink hair. By contrast, the game manual depicts Link as a tall blond character. Link's sprite was designed to appear more expressive, by featuring an animated hat and a face that turns red when pulling objects. The game reverted to a top-down perspective and features items that upgrade Link's moves with extra abilities such as running and swimming. It introduced several recurring elements, including the hookshot and the Master Sword. Link's combat abilities were developed to be more complex, giving him the ability to move diagonally, swing his sword in an arc and perform a spin attack that enables multi-directional attacks. His heart containers, which featured in the first game, were broken into pieces, necessitating the player to locate them and upgrade his health in smaller increments.

The first handheld title in the series, Link's Awakening (1993) on the Game Boy, introduced Link in monochrome until the DX port brought the game to the Game Boy Color. It takes place on Koholint Island after Link is washed ashore and features a combination of mostly top-down adventuring and some side-scrolling action sequences. It was the first overhead game in which Link's move set includes the ability to jump. Link is depicted in an anime art style in the game's cutscenes. The game involves collecting eight musical instruments from eight dungeons to wake the sleeping Wind Fish.

The Legend of Zelda: Ocarina of Time was the first game in the series to render Link in 3D and extensively expanded on his range of movements.

Ocarina of Time (1998), which was released for the Nintendo 64 (N64), was the first 3D game in the Zelda series. Link was depicted with blonde hair and his horse Epona was introduced as a mode of transport. The plot's time shifts allow the player to control Link first as a child and later as a adult. His green outfit reflects his role in the story as a Kokiri and his shield was updated to display the crest of the kingdom of Hyrule. His abilities were extensively developed to perform a variety of movements, including a swipe, stab, roll, dodge and dive. The game's Z-targeting system enables him to lock on to enemies and circle around them in combat. Through a built-in autojump function, he can also jump from a ledge. During his adventure, he is accompanied by the fairy Navi, who gives him hints about enemies and his surroundings.

Link returned on the N64 with the release of Majora's Mask (2000). Appearing again as child, he must save the land of Termina from the evil of Majora's Mask, which has drawn the moon into a decaying orbit, threatening to crash into Termina's Clock Town in three days. Link uses the Ocarina of Time to play the Song of Time, which allows him to repeatedly travel back in time to relive the three days until he successfully prevents the disaster. During the game, Link finds various magical masks that transform him into a Goron, Deku Scrub, or Zora, which each grant him special abilities such as gliding, swimming underwater and rolling. In the final boss battle with Majora, Link is transformed into Fierce Deity Link, a dark, adult version of himself with white eyes, before finally reverting to his child form.

In Oracle of Seasons and Oracle of Ages, a pair of interconnected games released in 2001 for the Game Boy Color, Link is controlled from a top-down perspective within a flat 2D game world. The two games involve Link being sent on a mission to the foreign lands of Holodrum and Labrynna in order to stop the disruption of the seasons by the General of Darkness, Onox, and the disruption of time by the Sorceress of Shadows, Veran. Link's key tools for uncovering areas and fighting his enemies are the Rod of Seasons and his magic harp.

In 2002, Nintendo published A Link to the Past & Four Swords on the Game Boy Advance. Four Swords was an original title packaged together with the rereleased entry A Link to the Past. Diverging from the traditional single-player approach, Four Swords was based on cooperative gameplay, allowing four players to interact together by connecting four Game Boy Advance systems. In Four Swords, four Links of different colours appear, each of which is controlled by a different player. The four versions of Link must then work together to complete the game's challenges.

The Wind Waker, which was released in 2002 on the GameCube, depicted Link and the game world in a cute childlike graphical style. He appears as a preteen cartoon character with a large head and huge eyes. His facial expressions communicate a range of emotions. The game involves exploring the islands that are dotted around the map to encounter characters and uncover dungeons. Link's key tool is the titular Wind Waker, a magical baton that enables him to manipulate the breeze as he crosses the Great Sea. Nintendo artist Satoru Takizawa explained that the game's sequel was abandoned due to being set on land and Toon Link's proportions not being suitable for horseback riding.

Four Swords Adventures, which was published for the GameCube in 2004, again reinterpreted traditional Zelda gameplay with a multiplayer approach. The plot centres on Link being split into four versions of himself by the Four Sword, resulting in four Links of different colours. He must embark on a quest that involves rescuing seven princesses from an evil sorcerer. The game depicts the Links in a 16-bit top-down perspective and involves each player controlling one of the four Links to explore the game world and defeat enemies in order to complete each level.

The release of The Minish Cap in 2004 on the Game Boy Advance returned the series to a single-player format. Link appears as a child viewed from a top-down perspective and is tasked with saving his childhood friend Princess Zelda. After a mysterious stranger named Vaati arrives at a festival celebrating the coming of the Picori, he destroys the sacred Picori Sword and turns Zelda to stone. During the game, Link is accompanied by a magical talking cap named Ezlo, who helps him on his quest and teaches him to shrink to the size of the Minish.

Twilight Princess (2006) was released on the GameCube and Wii and offers a darker adventure to previous entries in the series. The game features a more detailed depiction of a teenage Link who appears ready for battle wearing chainmail beneath his tunic. In the early part of the game, he becomes trapped in the Twilight, which transforms him into a wolf. Throughout the game, he is aided by Midna, an imp-like creature, who rides on his back and helps him on his quest. The game uses a variety of animal abilities for progression, such as the ability to follow scents. Twilight Princess aimed to provide a stark contrast to the cartoonish style of The Wind Waker, presenting a game world drained of colour and a story with a more mature tone. In addition to the teenage protagonist Link, the game also features the Link from Ocarina of Time and Majora's Mask as the teenage Link's ancestor and namesake the "Hero's Shade", who trains his descendant to defeat Ganondorf.

A direct sequel to The Wind Waker, Phantom Hourglass, was released in 2007 for the Nintendo DS. It follows Link as he embarks on a journey to save his friend Tetra from the Evil Phantom Bellum. The game was designed to appeal to a wider audience, with 3D cel-shaded graphics and a light-hearted tone. It takes inspiration from the style and tone of The Wind Waker, with Toon Link displaying various humorous expressions. The game made use of the console's touchscreen functionality, which enabled the player to control Link using a stylus instead of the traditional button controls.

Following on from Phantom Hourglass, the direct sequel Spirit Tracks (2009) reintroduced Toon Link to the Nintendo DS. The game is a sequel to its predecessor and has a similar format but replaces sailing by boat with travelling by train. Link must explore four main map pieces, return the power of the spirit tracks using the Spirit Flute, and navigate the Spirit Tower, the main labyrinth hub, aided by the spirit of Princess Zelda. The gameplay also incorporates the mechanic of controlling both Link and Zelda in a series of cooperative puzzles and boss battles.

Skyward Sword was released in 2011 on the Wii and made use of the Wii MotionPlus to swipe Link's sword, control a mechanical beetle, and ride his loftwing through the skies. The plot involves a romantic relationship between Link and Zelda. Beginning in Skyloft, a land floating above the clouds, Link is forced to descend to the surface after Zelda is kidnapped and then travels between the two lands wielding the Goddess Sword, a magical sword that holds a spirit named Fi, who acts as his guide. During his journey, Link imbues the Goddess Sword with three sacred flames and reforges it into the Master Sword. The game introduced Link's stamina meter for climbing surfaces and sprinting, and the ability to craft materials to make new items.

A Link Between Worlds was released in 2013 for the Nintendo 3DS and is a sequel to A Link to the Past. The plot revolves around a sorcerer named Yuga who has the ability to merge into walls and turn people into paintings. Link must foil his plan to revive Ganon. The storyline is set within the same world as A Link to the Past and was designed with a similar art style. Players are able to explore the two separate worlds of Hyrule and Lorule, which are reminiscent of the contrasting worlds of light and dark in A Link to the Past. The game introduced the ability for Link to turn into a painting, allowing him to walk along walls and switch between the two worlds.

Tri Force Heroes (2015) was the second original Zelda entry for the Nintendo 3DS and a departure from the series' tradition, with a focus on a three-player cooperative campaign. Link appears alongside two companions that can be stacked to reach high places, solve puzzles and defeat tall enemies. The storyline revolves around the theme of fashion and is set in the realm of Hytopia, where a witch has cursed Princess Styla to wear an ugly brown body suit. As a result, the Hytopian king calls for adventurers to break the curse. The gameplay departs from the usual Zelda open-world structure and involves completing dungeons and collecting materials to fashion outfits that provide specific abilities.

Breath of the Wild was released on the Nintendo Switch and Wii U in 2017 and reinvented the franchise by creating a massive open world for Link to explore. He has the ability to climb most surfaces, jump from structures and soar across the sky using a paraglider. He was designed to interact with the environment, collect materials for cooking and react to cold and heat. The complex nature of the environment also determined that his preexisting autojump functionality had to be developed into the ability to jump manually. The manual jump ability was later included in the 2026 release of Ocarina of Time on the Nintendo Switch 2. Breath of the Wild introduced significant changes to Link's design, notably the absence of his signature green outfit by default. The player can instead dress Link in a variety of outfits and more emphasis is placed on using a bow as a prominent weapon.

Link appears in Tears of the Kingdom, a direct sequel to the previous game released in 2023, which is set in the same version of Hyrule. Link loses his right arm after being attacked by a substance called Gloom and is saved by the spirit Rauru who grafts his own arm onto Link. This new arm plays a major role as the source of his abilities. It was designed to distinguish him from previous iterations, as the theme of "hands" was chosen as a key recurring aspect of the game for creating items as well as cooperating with other characters. Link's abilities include the Recall ability, which rewinds an object's movement, the Fuse ability, which merges objects to create new weapons, the Ultrahand ability, which enables the construction of vehicles and structures, and the Ascend ability, which enables Link to rise through ceilings. In the main quest line, Link also obtains Autobuild, which gives the ability to rebuild vehicles automatically without needing to manually build with Ultrahand.

Echoes of Wisdom (2024) is the first mainline Zelda game to feature Zelda rather than Link as the player character. Despite being originally intended as the protagonist, Link was ultimately replaced by Zelda as Aonuma felt that his sword fighting skills were not compatible with the copy and paste mechanism at the core of the game's echoes concept. The game begins with Link being playable in a sequence in which he saves Zelda from Ganon but is sucked through a portal into another dimension. Link makes numerous appearances throughout the game, both in real form and as an Echo mini boss. He also accompanies Zelda in the final dungeon and boss fight.

=== Spin-off games ===
In 1989, Link appeared in Zelda, which was released in the Game & Watch series of handheld electronic games. The unit features a multi-screen liquid-crystal display (LCD). The lower display renders Link fighting against dungeon monsters, while the upper display features the inventory. The gameplay is simpler than the NES game and replaces Ganon with eight dragons that kidnap Zelda. After battling through a dungeon, Link must defeat a dragon on the upper screen to receive a piece of the Triforce, before freeing Zelda with the eight recovered Triforce pieces. In the same year, The Legend of Zelda Game Watch was released, which was part of the LCD wristwatch product line licensed to and developed by Nelsonic Industries. In addition to its timekeeping function, the unit features gameplay based on the original The Legend of Zelda game but without a storyline. It features Link adventuring through eight dungeons comprising four rooms in each.

He also appears in Zelda no Densetsu: Kamigami no Triforce (Barcode Battler II), which was released by Epoch Co. in 1992 in Japan but not in North America. It was developed for the Barcode Battler II console and involves swiping cards to unlock various characters from A Link to the Past.

Link appears in Link: The Faces of Evil, Zelda: The Wand of Gamelon and Zelda's Adventure, The Legend of Zelda CD-i games published by Philips Interactive Media for its Compact Disc-Interactive (CD-i) players. While the games were licensed by Nintendo to use official Zelda characters, they were not produced or supervised by Nintendo. As well as being critically panned, none of these games are recognised by Nintendo as part of the series' official chronology. Unlike the main series, Link has the ability to speak. His personality mirrors his animated series counterpart in which he yearns for adventure and repeatedly attempts to get a kiss from Zelda.

Nintendo released a shooting video game in 2007 for the Wii titled Link's Crossbow Training. It is set within the Zelda universe and features Link as a playable character holding a crossbow. The game revisits the world of Twilight Princess and features the same landmarks and enemies. It involves the use of the Wii remote and nunchuck to create a light gun, which targets enemies with an onscreen reticule.

In the 2014 hack and slash video game Hyrule Warriors another incarnation appears as a Hyrulean soldier-in-training who helps to lead the campaign against the forces of evil. Young Link from Ocarina of Time and Majora's Mask also appears in the game as a playable character via downloadable content, while Toon Link from The Wind Waker appears as a playable character in Hyrule Warriors Legends, the Nintendo 3DS port of Warriors.

Link is also a playable character in the 2019 Nintendo Switch rhythm game Cadence of Hyrule, a crossover between Crypt of the NecroDancer and The Legend of Zelda series. Players can choose to play as either Link or Zelda and both are required at the end of the game. Link can perform a spin attack and carries a shield, while Zelda uses an ethereal block and a fireball.

In Hyrule Warriors: Age of Calamity, which acts as a prequel to Breath of the Wild and exists within the same game world, Link is accompanied by a roster of characters to fight alongside on the battlefield. The game progresses in the form of various missions that level up Link and his allies.

=== Other game series ===
Among SNES games, Link makes a cameo in Donkey Kong Country 2: Diddy's Kong Quest's "Cranky's Video Game Heroes" where he is ranked against the player next to Mario and Yoshi. Alongside Samus Aran, he makes a cameo in Super Mario RPG, where they are seen sleeping in separate beds at an inn. Link can be also be found at the start of a challenge course in F1 Race.

He is a playable character in the Super Smash Bros. series and has appeared in every title since the first Super Smash Bros. on the Nintendo 64. Toon Link from The Wind Waker appeared in Super Smash Bros. Brawl on the Wii in 2008 and in Super Smash Bros. for Nintendo 3DS and Wii U in 2014. Link later returned in Super Smash Bros. Ultimate for the Nintendo Switch in various incarnations, including green tunic Link, blue tunic Link from Breath of the Wild, Toon Link and Young Link.

In the GameCube version of Namco's Soulcalibur II, Link is a guest character. Miyamoto did not see a problem with Link appearing in a violent game, as he had already been established as a fighter in the Super Smash Bros. series. As part of the styling of a Zelda-themed game mode, he is featured in the 2006 puzzle video game Tetris DS. In Scribblenauts Unlimited, many Zelda series characters are summonable in the Wii U version, including Link. He is referenced by an archer dressed in green in The Legend of Zelda: Battle Quest, a mini game in the 2012 party game Nintendo Land, which involves archery and sword fighting in a cloth style. His costume appears alongside that of Samus in Dynasty Warriors VS for the Nintendo 3DS. Link appears in Sonic Lost World as part of "The Legend of Zelda Zone", where he rides his signature Crimson Loftwing and Sonic wears his green cap and tunic. In the 2013 compilation game NES Remix, players can play remixed portions of NES games, including playing as Link in a level of Donkey Kong.

The Skyward Sword incarnation of Link was a playable character in Mario Kart 8 riding a motorcycle. In Mario Kart 8 Deluxe, his Breath of the Wild incarnation also appears. He is referenced in 2015 downloadable content for Monster Hunter 4 with armour resembling his tunic, Monster Hunter Generations DLC and also Monster Hunter Stories. Incarnations of Link from The Legend of Zelda, The Wind Waker, Twilight Princess and Tri Force Heroes also appear as "Mystery Mushroom" costumes in Super Mario Maker. In 2016, Link appeared in a 3DS game titled My Nintendo Picross - The Legend of Zelda: Twilight Princess, a picture-puzzle game made available through the My Nintendo rewards program. The Master Sword and Hylian Shield appear alongside Link's Champion's Tunic from Breath of the Wild as Amiibo-unlocked content in the Nintendo Switch version of The Elder Scrolls V: Skyrim. In 2019, Link was added as a playable character in the 2.0.0 update to Super Mario Maker 2, which features the Master Sword power-up changing the Mario characters into Link.

=== Television series ===
From 1989 to 1990, The Legend of Zelda animated series aired as a part of DIC's The Super Mario Bros. Super Show!. Thirteen episodes were produced before the cancellation of The Super Mario Bros. Super Show. Based loosely on the first game, the series presents Link as a rude, lovesick teenager. The plot revolves around him living in Hyrule Castle and being recruited to protect the Triforce of Wisdom from Ganon while accompanied by a fairy princess named Spryte. He persistently attempts to kiss Zelda and repeatedly exclaims "Well excuse me, Princess!" when tired with her attitude, a catchphrase that has since become a common gamers' in-joke. With little input from Nintendo, the writers were given the freedom to develop the series. As Link's first voice actor, Jonathan Potts pictured him as a, "youthful, goofy teenage boy who acts before he thinks".

A similar version of Link and Zelda appear during the second season of Captain N: The Game Master. The storyline involves a character named Kevin being sucked into a TV and entering a game world. He helps Link and Zelda to stop Ganon from reviving to protect the Triforce.

Throughout 2013 and 2014, Link appeared in a series of comedic shorts titled The Legend of Zelda: The Misadventures of Link. The series made its debut on Nintendo Video, a video on demand service for the Nintendo 3DS. The series was based on The Wind Waker HD and aimed to present Link "in a new and hysterical light".

=== Film ===
Link is set to be portrayed by Benjamin Evan Ainsworth in the live-action film.

=== Comics and manga ===
Following the release of the original game, Wanpaku Comics released a manga book in Japan in September 1986 titled "The Hyrule Fantasy". It follows the basic plot of the game with some additions, including Link and Zelda communicating telepathically. Link appeared in manga-style novels published by Futabasha, including The Legend of Zelda: The Mirage Castle, which was published in Japanese in 1986. A similar book titled The Legend of Zelda: The Triforce of the Gods was released in 1992 with a storyline based on A Link to the Past. In the early 1990s, Valiant Comics published a serial comic based on The Legend of Zelda series. The comic series lasted for only five issues, with a sixth story published as part of the Nintendo Comics System. In this incarnation, Link's appearance was based on the original video game, giving him red hair, instead of his typical blonde or brown hair. The storyline reflects The Legend of Zelda animated television series, which was being aired around the same time. Link and Zelda's relationship is depicted as amorous, with Link attempting to get a kiss from Zelda and Zelda returning Link's affections. A manga adaptation of A Link to the Past was created by Ataru Cagiva in 1995 with the Japanese title Triforce of the Gods. A serial comic was created for Nintendo Power magazine by Japanese manga artist Shotaro Ishinomori. It was published in 1992 and later collected in graphic novel form in 1993. The plot is an alternate version of the storyline from A Link to the Past. Several other manga adaptations have been published by Viz Media based on the Zelda video games, including Ocarina of Time, Majora's Mask, A Link to the Past and The Minish Cap, which were illustrated by Akira Himekawa. The Japanese artist duo also wrote the long-running Twilight Princess manga, which began as a Japanese serialisation in 2016 followed by an English translation in 2017 and has been released as a series of volumes. Nintendo published Link's Hijinks, a translated webcomic by Saitaro Komatsu on its Play Nintendo website. The comic had originally appeared in the Japanese manga magazine CoroCoro Comic.

=== Gamebooks ===
Nintendo published several gamebooks based on The Legend of Zelda series. As part of the Nintendo Adventure Book series, which was similar to the Choose Your Own Adventure books, two books were published in 1992 titled The Crystal Trap and The Shadow Prince. In The Crystal Trap, the storyline involves Zelda saving Link from the trap, while in The Shadow Prince, Link must save Zelda with the help of a character named Charles. In 2001, two books based on Oracle of Seasons and Oracle of Ages were published by Scholastic, which were written by Craig Wessel and feature Link in a storyline based on the video games.

== Merchandise ==
Since 2014, various amiibo of Link have been released in a variety of incarnations. Three amiibo for the Super Smash Bros. series of Link, Toon Link and Young Link were released in 2014, 2015 and 2019. Various incarnations have been created as amiibo for the Zelda series, including Wolf Link and Midna, 8-bit Link, Ocarina of Time Link, Toon Link from The Wind Waker, incarnations from Majora's Mask, Skyward Sword, Twilight Princess and Link's Awakening, archer and rider figures from Breath of the Wild and the incarnation from Tears of the Kingdom. Guinness World Records reported that as of 1 February 2018, Link is the most prolific Nintendo character released as an amiibo. In addition to appearing on branded merchandise, his image has been reproduced in the form of figurines, plush toys and action figures. In May 2024, several versions of Link were announced in Lego minifigure form for a two-in-one Lego set of The Great Deku Tree, including adult and young Link from Ocarina of Time and Link from Breath of the Wild.

== Reception ==
=== Critical reception ===
Link has been widely described by critics as one of the greatest or most iconic video game characters of all time. Gabriel Aikins of Polygon noted that he is one of the most recognisable and beloved characters in the gaming industry. Complex described him as one of the "most badass" comic book characters, and emphasised the fond memories that most gamers have of their first encounter with Link and the nostalgia that he creates within the video game community. UGO considered Link to be the top comic book character who needs their own movie: "Get Peter Jackson or Guillermo del Toro to do it, dump a ton of money into it, and we'll all die happy". Link has also proven to be a popular guest character in other video games series. In 2008, IGN chose him as the best bonus character in the Soulcalibur series, while GameDaily considered him the best Smash Bros. character. Link's acquisition of the Master Sword has been described as an "epic" series-defining moment and the sequence in Ocarina of Time was ranked as the most unforgettable moment in gaming by IGN. Matthew Byrd, writing for Den of Geek, said that it represents the transformative moment for both Link and the player when he finally achieves his destiny as hero. Link was chosen as the "hottest video game character" in June 2006 by Out magazine for appearing as "Nintendo's sexy farm-boy-turned-wolf" in Twilight Princess. Critics have commented on his sex appeal, including Jeffrey Parkes of Polygon who likened his Skyward Sword incarnation to a himbo and Kirsten Carey of The Mary Sue who described his official Tears of the Kingdom artwork as "a dangerous thirst trap". Brian Feldman for New York magazine highlighted that Nintendo had finally acknowledged Link's sex appeal through the dialogue of various side characters in Breath of the Wild.

Anthony John Agnello of GamesRadar+, described Link's earliest iteration as lacking in height and expressiveness, but impressively fast and versatile for an RPG hero. He noted that his design was upgraded to a "gloriously personable cartoon character" by the release of A Link to the Past. The cartoon rendition in the 1989 television series was widely criticised, partially due to its obnoxious characterisation of the hero that Michael Mammano of Den of Geek described as "appalling". The child iteration in Ocarina of Time was fondly remembered by Dominic Preston writing for NME, who noted the clever touches in his character that help players to see the game through a child's eyes and motivate them to explore. Richard George and Audrey Drake of IGN commented that the game was the first to give Link more character depth and used its time shifts to illustrate his growth from youthful innocence to adulthood. Ryan Lambie of Den of Geek described Link's combat abilities in the game as "revolutionary", particularly the Z-targeting system that allowed him to lock on and face his enemies in swordplay, which was afterwards adopted throughout the games industry. According to Lotte Reinbold, writing for The Guardian, his transformations into various creatures in Majora's Mask were "shocking and profound", as the pain he experiences when putting on a mask seems to strip away at his former identity as the Hero of Time. Kate Gray for Nintendo Life highlighted Link's stoicism and altruism in the face of imminent death and opined that the game centres on his sacrifice and resulting loss of innocence and childhood.

Toon Link's unveiling for The Wind Waker proved to be initially controversial due to its highly stylised cartoon design.

When Miyamoto unveiled the cartoon design for Link at E3 2002 for The Wind Waker, it diverged from a more realistic young adult model previously seen battling Ganondorf at the Nintendo Space World Demo in 2000. IGN noted that the crowd did not respond with the same enthusiasm that was seen at the unveiling of Twilight Princess in 2004. Toon Link was presented at a time when the games industry was pushing for grittier heroes. Many fans responded with outrage after seeing Link depicted in a childlike cartoonish style. Aonuma commented that this response was due to gamers fearing change, as the art style was so different from previous games in the series. The reception to Toon Link later improved, leading many players to express a fondness for the character. Jose Otero of IGN commented, "Of all the incarnations of Link in the 3D era of this series, the young, cartoon iteration is the most capable fighter". In his review of The Wind Waker HD, Oli Welsh of Eurogamer said this was his favourite Link, describing him and the game as "energetic, spirited and soulful".

David Meikleham of GamesRadar+ noted that following the controversy around Toon Link, Nintendo had played it safe by unveiling the most graphically realistic version of Link created for Twilight Princess and that this incarnation was warmly received by fans who wanted to see a handsome elfin hero. When a preview trailer depicting Link in the realistic art style was unveiled at E3 2004, the audience reacted with frenzied applause. Griffin McElfroy of Polygon felt that Link's transition into Wolf Link did not provide satisfying combat when compared to the mastery of his sword manoeuvres. Oli Welsh thought that Link's inseparable relationship with Zelda in Spirit Tracks was "adorable" and "heartwarming", as it changed the convention of Link being a lone hero. The relationship between Link and Zelda in Skyward Sword was praised by Susan Arendt of The Escapist for moving away from the traditional narrative of a prophesied hero to a more personal concern of saving his childhood friend. In his review of Skyward Sword HD, Josh West of GamesRadar+ felt that Link looks "a little ridiculous" holding up his sword as he traverses the game environment resulting from Nintendo's decision to centre the game around motion controls, but considered it a small price for the precision of the gameplay. In an IGN review of A Link Between Worlds, Keza Macdonald opined that the game world had less personality than others in the series due to Link being reduced to a blank character, but commented that the nostalgia for A Link to the Past was "emotionally potent".

Jacob Krastenakes of The Verge, questioned Link's role as the player character and opined that he and Zelda could be switched and "he could simply be the other character, who is off doing their own thing". Ben Kuchera of Polygon noted that although Nintendo "can bend the lore and mythology to justify every other goofy idea" they draw the line at a female version of the character. Sara Gitkos for iMore questioned Link's role as the protagonist, noting that the titular character of the series had been sidelined. She commented that Zelda served as Link's prize, although in recent games she is more of a partner, but conceded that this would be difficult to change because Link "doesn't have any character to speak of, but rather is the place holder for us, and we become him".

Link's abilities in Breath of the Wild were lauded, with Matthew Castle of GamesRadar+ calling his flexibility, particularly when climbing cliffs, a "revelation" compared to other game heroes. In his Nintendo Life review of the game, Thomas Whitehead praised his athleticism, particularly the ability to dash, climb and glide, for being essential components for problem solving. Matt Kamen of Wired felt that his vulnerability, caused by starting the game in rags and collecting highly degradable weapons, impacts the gameplay by making the player more cautious. Anticipation was high leading up to the release of Tears of the Kingdom, partially driven by speculation over Link's glowing right arm, which featured prominently in the trailers. This led to various theories about its role and implications in the story. Isaiah Colbert of Kotaku noted the similarities of this scenario to Prince Ashitaka whose right arm is cursed in the 1997 Japanese animated film Princess Mononoke. Link's new abilities granted by his arm were praised by critics. Steve Watts of GameSpot commented that his abilities are the engine driving the game and are a "beautifully implemented evolution" providing opportunities for inventiveness and creativity. Ash Parrish of The Verge said that his combined powers "create infinite possibilities" but noted that he is "tasked with the same old quest: find Zelda".

=== Analysis ===
Jonathan Holmes, writing for Destructoid, questioned whether Link should be viewed as an individual or a blank slate avatar. He said that Nintendo had successfully created Link as both a specific character and an abstract concept, illustrated by the player choosing the character's name at the start of various games. Describing Link as a "non-character who's [sic] only purpose is to act as doorway for the player into the game world", he opined that through the reincarnation myth and use of multiple timelines, Nintendo had successfully shaped Link into a series of individuals. Den of Geek's Aaron Greenbaum asserted that even though Link does not have voice lines, he is a different character in every incarnation and each game makes it clear that he communicates: "This paradoxical characterization helps players insert themselves into Link's shoes but also gives him a personality, despite not being designed with one". Ryan Lambie of Den of Geek praised him as "the videogame equivalent of Tintin" because he is, "the archetypal young hero, embodying all the optimism, generosity and spirit of adventure a broad fantasy action game requires". He also praised Link as "the ultimate videogame underdog" and "an ordinary yet brave little guy who wants to save the world, in spite of insurmountable odds". Riley McAtee, writing for The Ringer, opined that the spirit of Link is the combination of courage as a defining characteristic and the absence of dialogue, which help to immerse players in the game, making him "the quintessential video game hero". Nick Thorpe of GamesRadar+ considered that the success of Link's character as an archetypal hero is that players identify and grow with him during each game and that his accomplishments are a "shared victory" where the player can achieve great feats that could never be accomplished in reality.

=== Influence and legacy ===
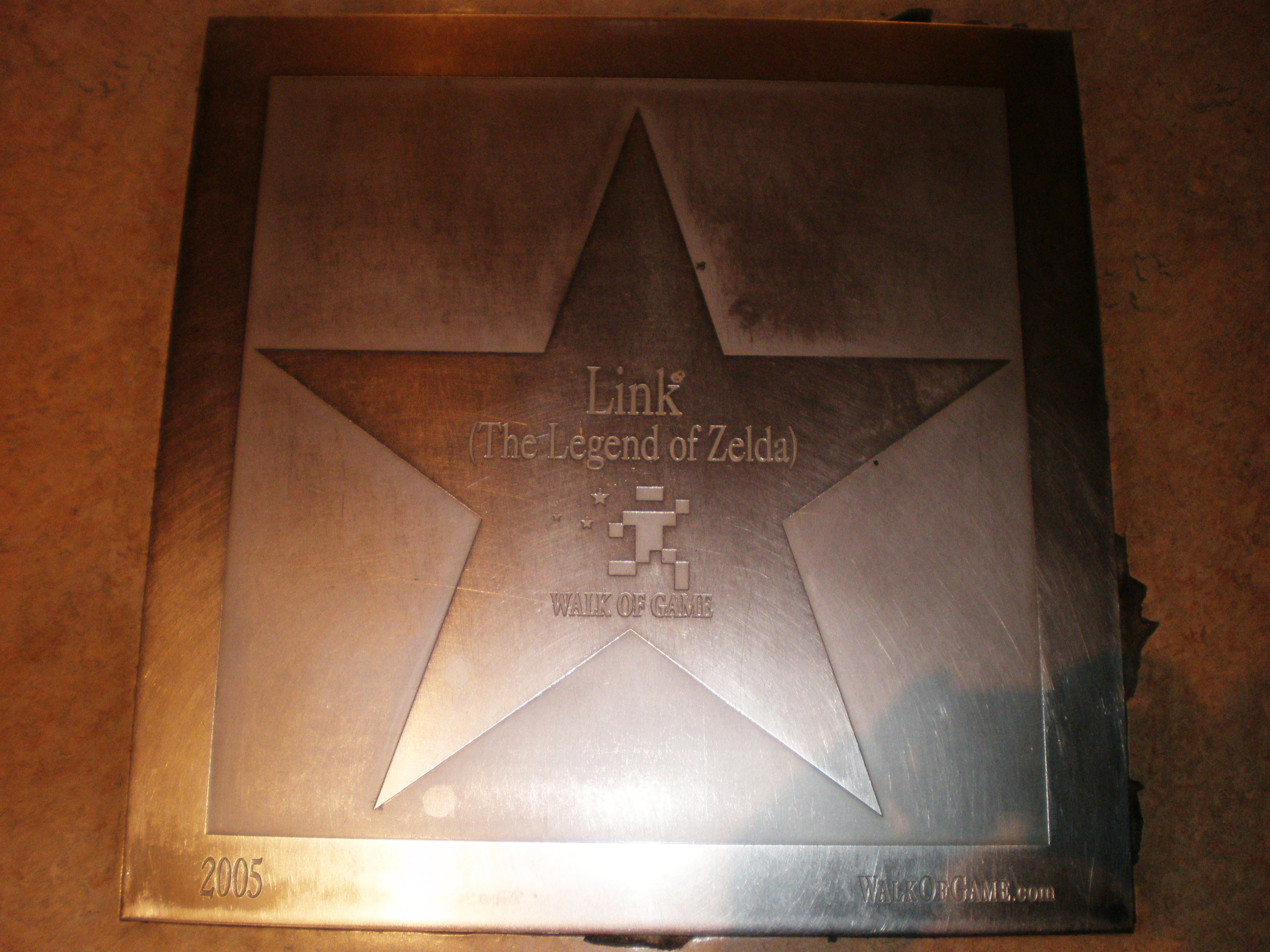
Link's star at the Walk of Game in the Metreon, San Francisco

As the mascot of The Legend of Zelda series, Link has become a widely recognisable character in pop culture. Damien McFerran of Nintendo Life remarked that the enigmatic nature of his character leaves him open to interpretation and makes him "one of the most drawn and imitated video game icons". In 2011, readers of the Guinness World Records Gamer's Edition voted Link as the second best video game character of all time, behind Mario. Since the release of Super Smash Bros. Ultimate in December 2018, he holds the Guinness World Record as the most ubiquitous action-adventure video game character, having appeared in 40 unique video games, not including rereleases and HD remasters. On 3 June 2025, Guinness World Records named Link as the most critically acclaimed video game playable character, as he has appeared in nine unique entries in GameRankings.com's list of the top 100 all-time best reviewed video games.

Critics widely consider Link's adventures to be influential on the video game industry. The original The Legend of Zelda video game influenced the evolution of the action role-playing video game genre, being an early example of open world design and nonlinear gameplay. The series has inspired numerous other game titles to adopt a similar action-adventure gameplay and open world exploration, with these games being commonly referred to as "Zelda clones". In 2005, Link was awarded a star on the Walk of Game along with his creator, Shigeru Miyamoto, noting that "the series has produced the most popular role-playing game titles in history". In 2011, Empire said that "Link has grown into one of the world's most celebrated console heroes, and helped establish RPGs as an international gaming standard". In 2017, Time named Link as one of the most influential video game characters of all time commenting: "Link embodies the selfless hero on a transformative journey, a storytelling trope we've seen in countless titles from Mass Effect's Commander Shepard to Halo's Master Chief". In 2024, a poll conducted by BAFTA with around 4,000 respondents named Link as the seventh most iconic video game character of all time.

== See also ==
- Characters of The Legend of Zelda
