= List of video game designers =

This is a list of notable video game designers, past and present, in alphabetical order. The people in this list already have Wikipedia entries, and as such did significant design for notable computer games, console games, or arcade games. It does not include people in managerial roles (which often includes titles like "Producer" or "Development Director") or people who developed a concept without doing actual design work on the game itself (sometimes applicable to "co-creator" or "creator" roles). Just because a game is listed next to a designer's name does not imply that person was the sole designer. As with films, the credits for video games can be complicated.

== A ==
- Allen Adham: World of Warcraft.
- Michel Ancel: Rayman, Beyond Good & Evil.
- Ed Annunziata: Ecco the Dolphin, Vectorman, Kolibri, Mr. Bones, Mort the Chicken
- Chris Avellone: Fallout 2, Planescape: Torment, Icewind Dale, Star Wars Knights of the Old Republic II: The Sith Lords, Fallout: New Vegas

== B ==
- Ralph Baer: "Father of Video Games," created Chase (1967), the first game played in a television set.
- Clive Barker: Undying, Jericho.
- Richard Bartle: co-author of MUD, the first multi-user dungeon.
- Arnab Basu: Tomb Raider series and Batman: Arkham Asylum
- Chris Beatrice: Caesar, Lords of the Realm.
- Seamus Blackley: Flight Unlimited, Ultima Underworld, System Shock, and Trespasser
- Marc Blank: Zork
- Cliff Bleszinski: Gears of War, Gears of War 2, & LawBreakers
- Jonathan Blow: Braid, The Witness.
- Ed Boon: Mortal Kombat
- Brenda Brathwaite: Wizardry 8
- Bill Budge: Raster Blaster, Pinball Construction Set
- Danielle Bunten Berry: M.U.L.E., The Seven Cities of Gold
- Eric Barone: Stardew Valley
- Cory Barlog: God of War II, God of War (2018)
- Stéphane Boudon: Assassin's Creed Mirage

== C ==
- Tim Cain: Fallout, Arcanum
- Rich Carlson: Strange Adventures in Infinite Space, Weird Worlds: Return to Infinite Space
- Charles Cecil: Broken Sword, Beyond a Steel Sky
- Mark Cerny: Marble Madness, Knack
- Eric Chahi: Another World, Heart of Darkness
- Trevor Chan: Capitalism, Capitalism II, Seven Kingdoms, Seven Kingdoms II: The Fryhtan Wars, Bad Day L.A., Restaurant Empire
- Doug Church: Ultima Underworld, Ultima Underworld 2, System Shock
- Lori and Corey Cole: Quest for Glory series, Mixed-Up Fairy Tales, Castle of Dr. Brain
- Chris Crawford: Eastern Front, Balance of Power
- Scott Cawthon: Five Nights at Freddy's
- Naomi Clark: Consentacle

== D ==
- Don Daglow: Dungeon, Intellivision Utopia, Earl Weaver Baseball, Neverwinter Nights
- Patrice Désilets: Assassin's Creed.
- Dino Dini: Kick Off, Kick Off 2, Player Manager, GOAL!, Dino Dini's Soccer
- Neil Druckmann: The Last of Us, The Last of Us Part II, Uncharted 2: Among Thieves, Uncharted 4: A Thief's End
- Jakub Dvorsky: Samorost, Machinarium.

== F ==
- Josef Fares: Brothers: A Tale of Two Sons, A Way Out, It Takes Two
- Brian Fargo: Bard's Tale, Wasteland
- Steve Fawkner: Warlords, Puzzle Quest
- Steve Feak: DotA Allstars, League of Legends
- Kelton Flinn: Air Warrior
- David Fox: Zak McKracken and the Alien Mindbenders
- Toby Fox: Undertale and Deltarune
- Nina Freeman: Cibele, Tacoma
- Ed Fries: Halo 2600
- František Fuka: Tetris 2
- Tokuro Fujiwara: Ghosts 'n Goblins
- Rob Fulop: Demon Attack, Cosmic Ark, Night Trap

== G ==
- Toby Gard: Tomb Raider
- Richard Garriott: Ultima
- Andy Gavin: Crash Bandicoot, Crash Bandicoot 2: Cortex Strikes Back, Crash Bandicoot: Warped, Crash Team Racing, Jak and Daxter: The Precursor Legacy, Jak II, Jak 3
- Ari Gibson: Hollow Knight, Hollow Knight: Silksong
- Ron Gilbert: Maniac Mansion, Monkey Island
- Julian Gollop: Chaos, Laser Squad, X-COM: UFO Defense.
- Brian Green: Meridian 59
- Stefano Gualeni: Tony Tough

== H ==
- Dean Hall: DayZ
- Jon Hare: Sensible Soccer, Cannon Fodder, Wizball
- Stieg Hedlund: Diablo, Diablo II, StarCraft
- Amy Hennig: Uncharted: Drake's Fortune, Uncharted 2: Among Thieves, Uncharted 3: Drake's Deception, Legacy of Kain: Soul Reaver
- William Higinbotham: Tennis for Two
- Yuji Horii: Dragon Quest, Chrono Trigger
- Todd Howard: Elder Scrolls, Fallout 3
- Casey Hudson: Mass Effect 1-3, Star Wars: Knights of the Old Republic

== I ==
- IceFrog: Defense of the Ancients, Dota 2
- Takashi Iizuka: Sonic the Hedgehog, Nights into Dreams
- Tomonobu Itagaki: Dead or Alive, Ninja Gaiden, Devil's Third
- Shigesato Itoi: Mother
- Tōru Iwatani: Pac-Man, Pole Position

== J ==
- David Jaffe: God of War, Twisted Metal
- Jennell Jaquays: leader of game design for Coleco in the 1980s, designer and level designer for Quake 2, Quake III Arena
- Eugene Jarvis: Defender, Robotron: 2084
- Jane Jensen: Gabriel Knight series, Gray Matter
- Soren Johnson: Civilization III, Civilization IV
- David Jones: Lemmings, Grand Theft Auto

== K ==
- Josef Kates, designer of Bertie the Brain
- Iikka Keränen, co-designer of Strange Adventures in Infinite Space, Weird Worlds: Return to Infinite Space
- Takeshi Kitano: Takeshi's Challenge
- Rieko Kodama: Phantasy Star series, Skies of Arcadia
- Hideo Kojima: Metal Gear series, Snatcher, Policenauts, and Death Stranding.
- Jarek Kolář: Vietcong.
- Kowloon Kurosawa: Hong Kong 97

== L ==
- Marc Laidlaw: Half-Life, Half-Life 2
- Ken Levine: BioShock, Thief: The Dark Project
- Ken Lobb: GoldenEye 007
- Ed Logg: Asteroids, Centipede, Gauntlet
- Gilman Louie: Falcon, Super Tetris, Battle Trek
- Christine Love: Analogue: A Hate Story, Ladykiller in a Bind, Get in the Car, Loser!
- Al Lowe: Leisure Suit Larry

== M ==
- Gregg Mayles: Banjo-Kazooie series, Viva Piñata
- American McGee: American McGee's Alice, Doom, Quake, American McGee's Grimm
- Edmund McMillen: Gish, Aether, Coil, Spewer, The Basement Collection, Super Meat Boy, The Binding of Isaac, The Binding of Isaac: Rebirth, The End Is Nigh, The Legend of Bum-bo, Mewgenics
- Colin McComb: Planescape: Torment, Torment: Tides of Numenera
- Brad McQuaid: EverQuest
- Jordan Mechner: Karateka, Prince of Persia
- Sid Meier: Civilization, Railroad Tycoon
- Steve Meretzky: Planetfall, The Hitchhiker's Guide to the Galaxy, A Mind Forever Voyaging, Leather Goddesses of Phobos
- Shinji Mikami: Resident Evil
- Robyn Miller, Rand Miller: Myst
- Jeff Minter: Tempest 2000, Gridrunner
- Shigeru Miyamoto: Donkey Kong, Mario, The Legend of Zelda
- Hidetaka Miyazaki: Dark Souls, Bloodborne, Sekiro, Elden Ring
- Tetsuya Mizuguchi: Lumines, Rez, Space Channel 5
- Peter Molyneux: Populous, Syndicate, Black and White, Fable
- Brian Moriarty: Trinity, Loom
- David Mullich: The Prisoner, I Have No Mouth and I Must Scream

== N ==
- Yuji Naka: Sonic the Hedgehog, Phantasy Star Online, Nights into Dreams
- Doug Neubauer: Star Raiders, Solaris
- Garry Newman: Garry's Mod, Rust
- Gabe Newell: Half-Life (series)
- Toshihiro Nishikado: Space Invaders, Speed Race, Gun Fight
- Tetsuya Nomura: Final Fantasy, Kingdom Hearts

== O ==
- Yoshiki Okamoto: Street Fighter
- Scott Orr: Madden NFL

== P ==
- Alexey Pajitnov: Tetris
- Rob Pardo: World of Warcraft, Warcraft III
- William Pellen: Hollow Knight, Hollow Knight: Silksong
- David Perry: MDK, Earthworm Jim, Wild 9, Enter the Matrix
- Markus Persson: Minecraft
- Sandy Petersen: Lightspeed, Doom, Rise of Rome
- Simon Phipps: Rick Dangerous, ShadowMan, Harry Potter and the Philosopher's Stone
- Randy Pitchford: Borderlands, Brothers in Arms, Half-Life
- William Pugh: The Stanley Parable

== R ==
- Robert Topala: Geometry Dash
- Frédérick Raynal: Alone in the Dark, Little Big Adventure, Toy Commander
- Paul Reiche III: World Tour Golf, Strange Adventures in Infinite Space, Mail Order Monsters, the Star Control series, the Archon series, the Starflight series, and the Skylanders series
- Tommy Refenes: Super Meat Boy
- Brian Reynolds: Civilization II, Sid Meier's Alpha Centauri, Rise of Nations and FrontierVille
- Chris Roberts: Wing Commander, Star Citizen
- Warren Robinett: Adventure, Rocky's Boots, & Robot Odyssey
- Scott Rogers: Maximo: Ghosts to Glory, Maximo vs. Army of Zin, God of War
- Ken Rolston: The Elder Scrolls (Morrowind and Oblivion)
- John Romero: Doom, Quake, Daikatana
- Jason Rubin: Crash Bandicoot, Crash Bandicoot 2: Cortex Strikes Back, Crash Bandicoot: Warped, Crash Team Racing, Jak and Daxter: The Precursor Legacy, Jak II, Jak 3

== S ==
- Yoot Saito: Seaman, Odama, The Tower SP
- Hironobu Sakaguchi: Mistwalker, Final Fantasy series, Chrono Trigger
- Masahiro Sakurai: Kirby, Super Smash Bros.
- Kevin Saunders: Torment: Tides of Numenera, Neverwinter Nights 2: Mask of the Betrayer
- Chris Sawyer: Transport Tycoon, RollerCoaster Tycoon.
- Josh Sawyer: Neverwinter Nights 2, Icewind Dale, Baldur's Gate: Dark Alliance
- Tim Schafer: Grim Fandango, Psychonauts
- Jesse Schell: Toontown Online, Pixie Hollow
- Glen Schofield: Dead Space
- Laura Shigihara: Rakuen
- Ryan Shwayder: EverQuest II
- Jeremiah Slaczka: Scribblenauts, Drawn to Life
- Doug Smith: Lode Runner
- Harvey Smith: Deux Ex, more
- Warren Spector: System Shock, Thief, Deus Ex
- Tim & Chris Stamper: Wizards & Warriors, Battletoads, Donkey Kong Country, Donkey Kong Country 2: Diddy's Kong Quest & Donkey Kong Country 3: Dixie Kong's Double Trouble!
- Bruce Straley: Uncharted 2: Among Thieves, Uncharted 4: A Thief's End, The Last of Us
- Goichi Suda: Killer7, No More Heroes
- Yu Suzuki: Afterburner, Hang-On, Virtua Racing, Virtua Fighter, Ferrari F355 Challenge, Shenmue, Out Run
- Kim Swift: Portal
- David Sirlin: Super Street Fighter II Turbo HD Remix

== T ==
- Satoshi Tajiri: Pokémon
- Yoko Taro: Drakengard, Nier, Nier: Automata
- Toshiro Tsuchida: Front Mission, Arc The Lad
- Chris Taylor, Total Annihilation
- Maddy Thorson: Towerfall, Celeste
- John Tobias: Mortal Kombat
- Keiichiro Toyama: Silent Hill, Siren, Gravity Rush, Gravity Rush 2
- Andy Tudor: Shift 2: Unleashed

== U ==
- Fumito Ueda: Ico, Shadow of the Colossus, The Last Guardian

== V ==
- Jon Van Caneghem: Might and Magic, Heroes of Might and Magic
- Daniel Vávra: Mafia: The City of Lost Heaven, Kingdom Come: Deliverance
- Swen Vincke: Divinity, Baldur's Gate 3

== W ==
- Robin Walker: Team Fortress, Team Fortress 2, Half-Life: Alyx
- Tony Warriner: Beneath A Steel Sky, Obsidian (1986 video game), Broken Sword1
- Christopher Weaver: Gridiron!
- Jordan Weisman: BattleTech, MechWarrior
- Richard Vander Wende: Riven
- Evan Wells: Gex: Enter the Gecko, Crash Bandicoot: Warped, Crash Team Racing, Jak and Daxter: The Precursor Legacy, Jak II, Jak 3
- Bill Williams: Necromancer, Alley Cat, Mind Walker
- Roberta Williams: King's Quest
- Tim Willits: Quake, Quake II, Quake III Arena, Quake III: Team Arena, Doom 3
- Gary Winnick: Maniac Mansion, Thimbleweed Park
- Will Wright: SimCity, The Sims, Spore

== Y ==
- Kazunori Yamauchi: Gran Turismo
- Gunpei Yokoi: Metroid, Kid Icarus
- Derek Yu: Spelunky, UFO 50.

== See also ==
- List of video game industry people
- List of game designers
