= Hotel Giant =

2002 video game

- North American cover art
- Developer: Enlight Software
- Publisher: JoWooD Productions
- Designer: Trevor Chan
- Platform: Windows
- Release: NA: 17 May 2002; EU: 2002
- Genre: Business simulation game
- Modes: Single-player, multiplayer

Hotel Giant (simplified Chinese: 模拟饭店; traditional Chinese: 模擬飯店; pinyin: Mó Nǐ Fàn Diàn), known in North America as Maximum Capacity: Hotel Giant, is a business simulation game developed by Enlight Software and published by JoWooD Productions for Windows.

== Gameplay ==
The play of the game involves developing and managing a hotel. The user starts with a pre-made building to which they add rooms, place useful and decorative objects in the rooms, and set up hotel details such as advertising. Once this has happened, the user opens up the hotel to the public and starts to run it as if it were a real business. It is similar to the "Tycoon" style of game (Railroad Tycoon, RollerCoaster Tycoon, Zoo Tycoon, etc.), in which the player creates a system or establishment and then runs it. Hotel Giant 2 offers improved graphics, more features and a new campaign.

== Versions ==
There are currently three versions of Hotel Giant. These are:

- Hotel Giant, released 14 May 2002
- Hotel Giant 2, released in UK on 21 November 2008
- Hotel Giant DS

== Reception ==
Reception

Aggregate score
Aggregator	Score
Metacritic	59/100

Review scores
Publication	Score
Computer Games Magazine	2.5/5
Computer Gaming World	3/5
GameSpy	79%

Hotel Giant received a "Gold" sales award from the Entertainment and Leisure Software Publishers Association (ELSPA), indicating sales of at least 200,000 copies in the United Kingdom.

The game received a fairly poor reception, with a Metacritic average of 54%. D+PAD said that any pros were "outweighed by some of the cons, most notably the repetitive and non-engaging nature of the gameplay." IT Reviews commented that the game "wasn't much fun" and there would be "more amusement with an old, second hand copy of Sim Tower".
