= The Tower SP =

2005 video game

- Developer: Vivarium
- Publishers: JP: Nintendo; NA: Sega
- Designer: Yoot Saito
- Platform: Game Boy Advance
- Release: JP: April 28, 2005; NA: March 14, 2006
- Genre: Construction and Management Simulation
- Mode: Single player

The Tower SP (ザタワーSP) is a 2005 construction and management simulation video game developed by Vivarium and published by Nintendo for the Game Boy Advance. It was released in March 2005 in Japan and April the same year by Sega in North America. It is a port and revision of SimTower (1994), which Vivarium's predecessor OPeNBook developed, with some elements of its sequel Yoot Tower (1998). In the game, the player is tasked to construct a tower for their company boss, Yama.

== Gameplay ==
=== Differences from SimTower ===
In The Tower SP, perhaps due to the limitations of the Game Boy Advance's system, the "Tower" status (the highest available tower rating) is obtained with a population of 2,000 people; a goal which is quite hard considering the height limit for the building is 50 floors(35 floors for the commercial tower) and a certain foundation width. The width is slowly expanded as Yama gets deregulation for the roads and buildings surrounding the player's Tower. However, reaching that population is not enough. The "Tower" status is only awarded when a wedding takes place in the building, which only occurs when a cathedral is constructed at the maximum height, the cathedral can be reached without any stress, the cathedral is full, and when there are 2,000 people in the building at that moment.

Achieving a "Tower" status with the Office Building unlocks the possibility of building a "Commercial Building". The site permits construction of a higher lobby at the ground floor, but doesn't permit the construction of building offices, condominiums, medical centers, security offices, nor recycling centers, allows up to 3 cinemas in the building (whereas the Office Building only allowed one), as well as a spa with water from a hot spring and hotel suites (once the appropriate star rating is reached). As such, building built in this mode may resemble a mall-hotel hybrid, depending on the player's design.

Other features are taken from Yoot Tower, while some are new. Restrooms must be built; security must check the player's tower nightly; housekeeping cleans offices weekly, and cockroach infestation now has three phases: one (which requires a bug bomb), two (which requires a costly exterminator), and three (which condemns the infested facility). Like Yoot Tower, the player must use different shops and stores to satisfy tenants and visitors.

== Reception ==
Reception

Aggregate score
Aggregator	Score
Metacritic	62/100

Review scores
Publication	Score
GameSpot	5.3/10
IGN	6.5/10

Frank Provo of GameSpot criticized the game for its lack of gameplay, visuals and audio while comparing the game unfavorably to its predecessor, though he praised the intuitive user interface and the variety of shops and offices. Jack DeVries of IGN was more positive, praising its simple and well-balanced gameplay.

== See also ==
- SimTower
- Yoot Tower
- Project Highrise
