= Seven Kingdoms =

The phrase Seven Kingdoms can refer to:

== History ==
- Seven Kingdoms of Kongo dia Nlaza, the precursors to the Kingdom of Kongo in Central Africa
- Seven Warring States, the combatants from a turbulent period of Chinese history
- Heptarchy, the precursors to the Kingdom of England in English history

== Other ==
- Seven Kingdoms (A Song of Ice and Fire), in the A Song of Ice and Fire fantasy novel series
- Seven Kingdoms (band), an American power metal band
- Seven Kingdoms (video game)
- Seven kingdoms (biology)
- Seven Kingdoms (DC Comics), multiple fictional locations associated with Aquaman
