= Trevor Chan =

Video game developer

- Occupation: Video game designer
- Known for: Designing the video game series Capitalism, Seven Kingdoms, Restaurant Empire, and Hotel Giant

Trevor Chan is a Hong Kong-based video game designer and CEO of Enlight Software. He is best known for designing the Capitalism series of business simulation games, the Seven Kingdoms series of real-time strategy games, the Restaurant Empire series, and the Hotel Giant series.

== Career ==
Chan began his game development career in the early 1990s while working as a programming consultant on an airline sales system. He released a strategy game simulating competition between program managers at a television station, which led to his development of the original Capitalism in 1995. Inspired by the empire-building elements of Sid Meier's Civilization, Chan adapted them into a real-time format for Seven Kingdoms, released in 1997. He designed and produced sequels for both series and continued expanding his portfolio with business simulations like Hotel Giant in 2002 and Restaurant Empire in 2003.

In 2004, Chan designed and produced Wars and Warriors: Joan of Arc, a hybrid of third-person action and real-time strategy gameplay set during the Hundred Years' War, in which players command troops as Joan of Arc in large-scale medieval battles.

As of 2025, he continues to support and update Capitalism Lab, the latest entry in the Capitalism series, with ongoing DLC releases.

== Capitalism series ==
The Capitalism series is a collection of business simulation games where players act as CEOs building and managing multinational corporations through activities like manufacturing, retailing, marketing, and stock trading. The series emphasizes economic strategy, resource management, and competition against AI opponents in various industries.

• Capitalism (1995) is the original entry, developed and designed by Chan and published by Interactive Magic. Players start with capital to construct facilities such as factories, farms, and stores, managing factors like supply chains, advertising, and market demand across 17 scenarios with goals like industry domination or profit targets. An expanded version, Capitalism Plus, added world maps, more products, random events, and a scenario editor.

• Capitalism II (2001) is the sequel, also designed by Chan and published by Ubisoft. It expands on the original with campaigns focused on capitalist and entrepreneurial challenges, multiplayer support, and refined mechanics for marketing, importing, and retailing, though with fewer agriculture-derived products.

• Capitalism Lab (2012) is a substantially improved standalone follow-up to Capitalism II, designed by Chan with major upgrades, fresh challenge scenarios, and continuous updates via downloadable content (DLC). Its expansions include:

• Subsidiary DLC (2014) allows players to create subsidiary companies led by AI CEOs and list them on the stock exchange via IPOs.

• City Economic Simulation DLC (2016) features advanced economic simulations with detailed GDP modeling and lets players take on the role of city mayors.

• Digital Age DLC (2018) focuses on tech startups, the software industry, and the internet and telecom sectors.

• Banking and Finance DLC (2020) simulates the banking and insurance industries while adding bond trading.

• Service Industry DLC (2024) enables management of shopping centers alongside varied service businesses such as fast food restaurants and coffee shops.

== Seven Kingdoms series ==
The Seven Kingdoms series consists of real-time strategy games blending empire-building, diplomacy, espionage, and combat across historical and fantasy settings. Players manage kingdoms inspired by ancient civilizations, balancing economy, military, and intrigue against human and monstrous foes.

• Seven Kingdoms (1997), designed by Chan and published by Interactive Magic, features seven cultures (e.g., Japanese, Vikings) with unique units and abilities, plus summonable "greater beings." Key mechanics include spy-based espionage, mercenary hiring, trade-focused economy, and non-combat conquest options like diplomacy or bribery. The 1998 expansion, Ancient Adversaries, added three more cultures and new war machines.

• Seven Kingdoms II: The Fryhtan Wars (1999), Chan's sequel published by Ubisoft, introduces 12 human civilizations and seven Fryhtan species—powerful, hoard-obsessed monsters that enslave humans and breed via "life force." Gameplay involves resource management (gold, food, reputation), god-granted powers, siege weapons, and dynamic campaigns, with an HD upgrade released in 2015.

== Hotel Giant series ==
The Hotel Giant series are business simulations where players construct and manage hotels, akin to "Tycoon" games, focusing on room design, advertising, and profitability.

• Hotel Giant (2002), designed by Chan and published by JoWooD Productions, lets players upgrade pre-built hotels with rooms and amenities, run operations, and compete in single- or multiplayer modes.

• Hotel Giant 2 (2008) is the sequel, building on the original with enhanced graphics, additional features, and a new campaign for deeper management simulation.

== Restaurant Empire series ==
The Restaurant Empire series are business simulation games centered on designing, staffing, and operating restaurant chains, with elements of story-driven campaigns and customization.

• Restaurant Empire (2003), designed by Chan and published by Enlight Software, casts players as chef Armand LeBoeuf competing against a conglomerate. Players select cuisines (American, French, Italian), customize menus and staff, and expand via minigames in a story mode, or play freely in sandbox mode.

• Restaurant Empire II (2009) is the sequel, also designed by Chan, adding German cuisine, cities like Munich, and new restaurant types (e.g., coffee shops). It features a remade campaign with returning characters, performance organization, uniform customization, and over 700 new decorations.
