= Wars and Warriors: Joan of Arc =

2004 video game

Wars & Warriors: Joan of Arc
- Developer: Enlight
- Publisher: Enlight
- Designer: Trevor Chan
- Composer: Jason Graves
- Platform: Microsoft Windows
- Release: NA: February 10, 2004; EU: February 20, 2004
- Genres: Action, Real-Time Strategy
- Mode: Single player

Wars & Warriors: Joan of Arc is a historically based computer game. Developed and published by Enlight, it was released in 2004. The player assumes the persona of Joan of Arc and leads the French in their attempt to win the Hundred Years' War. The game combines aspects of real-time strategy and action. An Xbox version was announced to be released in 2004 but was canceled.

== Gameplay ==
While the game has both action and strategy aspects, action predominates. Playing as Joan or one of several other French commanders, the player uses a variety of weapons to defeat enemy English soldiers. As the game progresses, the player gains combos and special attacks that enable him or her to defeat the English more effectively. The player also controls the French army and directs it in battle. There are eight levels, each featuring multiple objectives.

== Development ==
The game was in development for more than a year.

== Reception ==
Reception

Aggregate score
Aggregator	Score
Metacritic	60/100

Review scores
Publication	Score
Computer Gaming World	2.5/5
Game Informer	7.5/10
GameSpot	6.2/10
GameSpy	2/5
GameZone	6.9/10
IGN	6.9/10
PC Format	73%
PC Gamer (UK)	70%
PC Gamer (US)	49%

The game received "mixed" reviews according to the review aggregation website Metacritic. PC Gamer said that it "deserves the same fate as its namesake".
