= Enlight Software =

Video game developer

- Industry: Video games
- Founded: 1993
- Founder: Trevor Chan
- Headquarters: Hong Kong
- Products: Capitalism series Seven Kingdoms series Restaurant Empire series Bad Day L.A.
- Website: www.enlight.com

Enlight Software is a Hong Kong developer and publisher of video games. The company was founded by Trevor Chan in 1993, and their first project was the economic strategy game Capitalism, which was published by Interactive Magic in 1995. In 1997, they released Capitalism Plus (an updated version of Capitalism) and the real-time strategy game Seven Kingdoms. Later games include Virtual U, Capitalism II, Wars and Warriors: Joan of Arc, Seven Kingdoms II, Hotel Giant, Restaurant Empire, Zoo Empire, Marine Park Empire, Restaurant Empire II and Hotel Giant II.

In addition to developing their own games, Enlight have released several games from third-party developers in the United States, including: MercurySteam's American McGee Presents: Scrapland, Nadeo's TrackMania, and Egosoft's X2: The Threat.

Enlight's latest game, Capitalism Lab, a new expanded version of Capitalism II, was released on December 14, 2012. It has an improved look and feel of existing interfaces, supporting multiple screen resolutions. Its new features include enhanced simulation of the real estate market, purchases of land plots, enhanced macroeconomic simulation, the ability to build community and sports facilities, product class expertise, technology disruption, new products and a new natural resources system.
