= Digital: A Love Story =

2010 indie visual novel

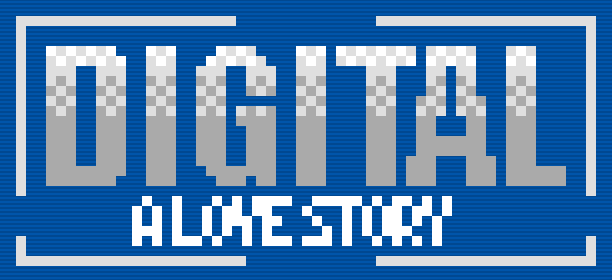
- Developer: Love Conquers All Games
- Designer: Christine Love
- Writer: Christine Love
- Engine: Ren'Py
- Platforms: Windows, Mac OS X, Linux
- Release: February 2010
- Genre: Visual novel
- Mode: Single-player

Digital: A Love Story is a visual novel by video game designer Christine Love, released for free in February 2010. Set "five minutes into the future of 1988", Digital tells the story of the protagonist's online relationship with a girl and their attempts to solve a mystery surrounding the deaths of several artificial intelligences. The game is presented entirely through the interface of a 1980s computer with online bulletin board system posts and messages from other characters; the protagonist's own messages are implied but never shown. The game's story is linear, with the player's actions unable to significantly change the course of the plot. The game was received positively, with critics especially praising the game's writing and plot, and it was noted in lists of the best indie games of 2010.

== Gameplay ==
The Amie interface. A message is open; behind it, music player and message storage application windows can be seen.

Digital: A Love Story is a visual novel, or interactive fiction game, where the game's story is told primarily through text. The game is presented as if on a computer from the late 1980s running the Amie operating system (the name and visual appearance a reference to 1.x versions of AmigaOS). The player logs into bulletin board systems, or BBSs, where they read and reply to messages from other people. Messages received from other characters in the game are displayed through a different program on the computer screen. Accessing a BBS requires the knowledge of the telephone number for that board, which the player must type in manually. Boards that require a long-distance telephone number to reach require the player to use illegally obtained long-distance calling card numbers found online. Accessing boards also requires the player to either set up a user account for that board or to know the password necessary to enter the system.

Many of the messages sent by the player and the replies back to those messages have no effect on the game. The messages that the player sends are never explicitly revealed, though their contents can be inferred from replies received from other characters in the game. The player, therefore, is unable to send a "wrong" reply or message, and the game cannot be lost. The player does not have a choice in the direction that the story takes, though the game requires the player to correctly decipher what actions to take before the plot can advance. A single playthrough of the game takes around one hour.

== Plot ==
The game, set "five minutes into the future of 1988", opens with the silent protagonist, whose name is given by the player, having just obtained a computer. When the player checks their messages, they learn the telephone number to the Lake City Local BBS, a local board, and can then log on to there. One of the topics posted to that board is some poetry by a girl named "*Emilia"; when the player responds to her message, the two start up a conversation. While this conversation is ongoing, the player learns of another BBS and of a board whose telephone number is in another area code. They also learn of an illegal method to get access to boards like that, which would otherwise require the purchase of long distance calling cards. The conversation between the player and *Emilia, which is inferred to have taken place over a much longer duration of time than has transpired in reality, begins at this point to show *Emilia forming an attachment to the player. Soon after, *Emilia confesses to the player that she loves them; the host computer for Lake City Local then breaks down, however, leaving the player unable to contact her.

Soon afterwards the owner of Lake City Local contacts the player with a garbled message that *Emilia had tried to send to them. This message implies that *Emilia is in danger, asking the player to contact someone named *Paris, and provides a mass of binary code. The player has no context for this message; but after hacking into another BBS, The Gibson, the player finds a cryptic message reposted from another board saying that there are several artificial intelligences (AIs) around the world that have been recently "killed", naming *Emilia as one of them. The player hacks into the source board for this message, and finds a history of artificial intelligence posted there by *Blue Sky, a "historian" AI.

According to *Blue Sky's records, the American government created an AI at the same time it created ARPANET in the 1970s. This AI, *Mother, in turn created child AIs, but its first attempt spread out of control and had to be destroyed by a virus that spread after it—later officially explained by the government as the real-life Creeper and Reaper worms. *Mother's later attempts, which could only exist on one system at a time, were more successful, and these AIs left the ARPANET in favor of the Internet when it was developed. *Reaper, however, continued to spread and destroyed any AI it found, such as *Emilia. The player finds *Paris, another AI and *Emilia's brother, on an ARPANET node, who explains that compiling the binary code in *Emilia's message can recreate her. The player compiles *Emilia onto their system, and the two learn of a "payload" that the other AIs have developed, which exploits a vulnerability that can cause *Reaper to self-terminate; however, infecting *Reaper with it requires that an AI be recompiled with it as living bait, meaning permanent deletion. Realizing that they have no other choice, *Emilia becomes the payload carrier. After a final conversation, the player allows *Emilia to sacrifice herself, saving the AIs and ending the game.

== Development ==
Digital was created and released by Christine Love for free in February 2010 under a CC BY-NC-SA 3.0 license. Although it was not her first game, it was her first successful one; Love noted in January 2011 that her previous titles were played by "less than a dozen" people, while Digital had been played by "countless thousands", gotten onto the reading lists of university classes, and became "a defining point in [her] writing career". It was also her largest game to date; prior to its release she thought of herself only as a writer, not as a game developer. She made Digital as a visual novel rather than just prose because she felt that immersing the player into the game would allow the story to resonate with them more than just reading the text. Love chose to set the game in the 1980s rather than more recently because she felt that the computing systems and number of people online then created a sense of isolation, which she felt was more conducive to both the romance and mystery aspects of the story. One of Love's influences on the gameplay was Uplink; she initially intended to reference more of its gameplay mechanics but eventually "streamlined" much of the hacking elements of Digital away.

Although *Emilia is explicitly female, Love purposely ensured that the protagonist's gender is never stated, as she wanted them to be a blank slate that the player would project themselves into, rather than a character that the player would control. She intended for this, combined with never showing what the protagonist actually says, to create more immersion in the story. Unofficially, however, Love thought of the relationship as "queer", both in respect to the player's gender and in respect to *Emilia as "a confused adolescent falling in love with someone she's not supposed to"; Love has stated that this did not come across as strongly as she intended. Love has said that one of the intended messages of the game was the importance of love and relationships, though not necessarily romantic love; as an example she specifically referenced *Emilia valuing saving her "family" due to her love for them over her adolescent love for the player.

== Reception ==
The writing and story of the game were especially praised by reviewers. Kieron Gillen of Rock, Paper, Shotgun said that after playing it, he "[couldn't] think of a better love story in the Western medium", and that the terse and minimalist prose worked well to create clearly defined characters. He also stated that the music was 'totally delightful'. A reviewer from The Economist called the story "engaging", saying that it provided a "memorable and thought-provoking experience". In an analysis of the game's story, Emily Short of Gamasutra called the decision to leave the protagonist blank rather than writing a viewpoint character "brilliant", saying that it made the entire game work much better than it otherwise would. A reviewer from The A.V. Club, grading the game as an "A", called the story "moving". The majority of the criticism for the game was in regards to the interface used to navigate the online world; while The Economist found it quirky and realistic, Gillen felt that it made it easy for the player to miss a key message, leaving the player stuck with no direction as to where to turn.

Gamasutra gave Digital an honorable mention in their "Best Indie Games of 2010" list. It was chosen as a "freeware game pick" by Tim W. of IndieGames, Gamasutra's independent games site, who said that it was "an absorbing experience that no other game from this day and age can offer". IndieGames also named it number two in their "Top Freeware Adventure Games of 2010". PC Gamer listed it as number seven in their "20 Free PC Games" feature in May 2011, saying that it was "an hour of gorgeously crafted, personality-imbued indie gaming".

Love later made a "spiritual sequel", don't take it personally, babe, it just ain't your story, and then another game "that further extends the non-linear style of Digital", Analogue: A Hate Story.
