= Don't Take It Personally, Babe, It Just Ain't Your Story =

2011 visual novel by Christine Love

- Title screen
- Developer: Love Conquers All Games
- Designer: Christine Love
- Engine: Ren'Py
- Platforms: Windows, Mac OS X, Linux
- Release: April 4, 2011
- Genre: Visual novel
- Mode: Single-player

Don't Take It Personally, Babe, It Just Ain't Your Story (stylized in all lowercase) is a 2011 visual novel by independent developer Christine Love. Intended as a spiritual sequel to Love's 2010 Digital: A Love Story, the game was developed over the course of a month and was released as a free download on April 4, 2011. Don't take it personally is a visual novel, with the majority of the plot taking place outside of the player's control except for key decisions. It follows a new high school literature teacher in 2027 over the course of a semester, with the ability to see private messages between students at any time without their knowledge. It deals with themes of privacy and relationships in the future. The game was received positively, with critics praising the interplay between the metafictional elements of the story and those of the game itself, with special acknowledgment reserved for the writing.

== Gameplay ==
A screenshot of the game, showing an Amie conversation thread between several of the students during a conversation in the classroom with Charlotte.

Don't take it personally is a visual novel, or interactive fiction game where the majority of the story is told through still images of the speaking characters in front of anime-style backgrounds with text overlaid. The player's viewpoint follows one character, the teacher in a school, with the player seeing his thoughts as well as his and the other characters' statements. The player advances the conversations the teacher is in or witnesses at will, but cannot go backwards and has little control over what any of the characters, including the teacher, are saying except at a few key moments. At these points, the player is presented with two or three choices for what the teacher says; which option is chosen can change what path the plot takes, in either a minor or major way.

In a departure from most visual novels the player can also see, at any time, the equivalent of texts and Facebook postings between the students on a school social network called AmieConnect (often shortened to "Amie"), as well as conversation threads on a 4chan-like imageboard that serve as foreshadowing for future plot points. These extra conversations take place in parallel to in-person conversations between characters, occasionally at the same time; the player is notified anytime a new text message or post is made. A single playthrough of the game takes "over an hour".

== Scenario ==
=== Setting ===
The game is set in a private high school in Ontario, in 2027. The player follows a new 11th-grade literature teacher at the school, John Rook, who has recently had his second divorce and is undergoing, in his words, a "bizarre midlife crisis" that has led him to quit his career in computers and become a teacher. The students in his class are Arianna Belle-Essai, Kendall Flowers, Taylor Gibson, Charlotte Grewal, Isabella Hart, Nolan Striukas, and Akira Yamazaki. Rook and all of the students have school-issued computers, which the students use to communicate between each other in private and public messages. Rook, and therefore the player, can see all of the messages that the students send, even the private ones; the school administration has told Rook that it is for monitoring online bullying, and that he is not to let anyone know that he can see students' private messages.

=== Plot ===
Soon after the game opens, the player learns that Kendall and Charlotte have just broken up out of a lesbian relationship, while a few weeks prior Taylor and Nolan had broken up out of a heterosexual relationship. Arianna develops a crush on the teacher, which in the player's first decision point Rook can reciprocate or not. Akira soon announces that he is gay, finding to his dismay that everyone else already knew. He then attempts to enter into a relationship with Nolan, who is unsure how to respond; Rook can encourage Nolan to try it out or let him decide on his own, but he enters a relationship with Akira regardless.

The next day, Isabella misses a meeting she set up with Rook, and does not return to the class. Through Amie texts and wall posts, the other students insinuate that she committed suicide, and the school administration tells Rook that they cannot provide him with any contact information for her. Class continues without her, and a little while later Arianna, if the player rejected her earlier in the game, makes another attempt to have a relationship with Rook. The player may choose to accept or reject her again. Through Amie, Rook learns that both Charlotte and Kendall separately wish to resume their relationship; the player can choose to influence Charlotte to try again or not, which changes whether or not the couple gets back together. Taylor jealously and unsuccessfully tries to drive a wedge between Nolan and Akira.

As the end of term approaches, Rook begins getting strange emails about Isabella's death, and begins seeing shinigami figures. Upset by these occurrences, when Akira's mother asks to speak to him concerning misuses of Amie, he assumes that she has found out that he is spying on the students' conversations. When he meets her, he finds that Isabella is alive and had simply moved away; the students made it look like she was dead via Amie as a prank that got out of control. Furthermore, they already knew that he could see their messages; Akira's mother explains that the students have no idea of online privacy, having always had technology like Amie, and assumed that anything they put online—even "private" messages—might be read by anyone. The game ends with Rook having a casual lunch with the students, a date with Arianna, or neither, depending on the choices made during the game by the player.

== Development ==
Don't take it personally was developed over the course of a month, and was released as a free download on April 4, 2011. It was written and developed by Christine Love, with artwork made for the game by Auro-Cyanide, artwork licensed from Tokudaya and Kimagure After, and with music licensed from Rengoku Teien and propanmode. It was created using the Ren'Py engine. It was Love's longest game to date, and her first attempt at a game with a branching storyline. It was intended as "a spiritual sequel of sorts" to Digital: A Love Story, a 2010 game by Love. The game was made for NaNoRenO (National Ren'ai Game Writing Month), a month-long contest in the vein of National Novel Writing Month (NaNoWriMo) where developers attempt to create a visual novel in one month. Love's favorite character to write was Kendall.

== Reception ==
Don't take it personally was chosen as a "freeware game pick" by IndieGames's Michael Rose, who said that it was worth playing through multiple times in order to see the different paths the story takes depending on the player's choices. The Daily Telegraph gave the visual novel the award for "Best Script" in its video game awards of 2011, stating that "Love's layered narrative of a high school teacher embroiled in his student's worries goes places most mainstream video games wouldn't dare." Pete Davison of GamePro noted the game as an example of the "creativity" missing in many large-budget titles, and praised the story, calling Love "a writer first and a game developer second." Alec Meer of Rock, Paper, Shotgun described the game as "a game about love, sex and the internet" that was "capable of being profoundly moving" and was about "what it is to feel like someone's kicked me straight in the heart". He praised Love's ability to use dialogue to effect an emotional response, though he noted that the game seemed to lose some of its impact in the final chapters and felt that the use of the "12chan" threads as a Greek chorus was "perhaps a meta-layer too far".

Aaron Poppleton of PopMatters called the game "a meditation on privacy in the modern age" and "one of the more thoughtful games to come out in a long time." He criticized the art direction of the game, saying that the limitation of creating the game in a month led to poor artwork and an unpolished presentation that let down the possibilities of the story. He did note that the story and writing of the game made the downsides of the game "almost entirely a moot point", and that it is a very strong game. Pete Davison of PC World, in an article about the treatment of sexuality in video games, called out the game as an example of a game that used sexual themes maturely to explore love and relationships. Emily Short of Gamasutra, in a discussion about the game, said that it was definitely worth playing and full of "charming characters, colorful dialogue, and important questions", but criticized the uneven exploration of issues regarding privacy versus personal boundaries. She said that the game's lack of focus on Rook's issues with personal and professional boundaries was a weakness in the story, given that the distinction between boundaries and privacy was crucial to the plot. Love collated common criticisms and reviews of the game on her blog, summarizing that while it was less praised than Digital: A Love Story, most players seemed to like the way she wrote the relationships and overall story. There was a consensus, however, that her portrayal of Rook was weak and that many players seemed to miss both that he was intended to be "an absolutely awful teacher" and that the potential relationship with Arianna was intended to be creepy and make the player feel bad. She also noted that her use of licensed artwork detracted from the game's potential in comparison to the reaction to the custom works.
