= Restaurant Empire II =

2009 video game

- Developer(s): Enlight Software; Virtual Programming (OS X)
- Publisher(s): NA: Paradox Interactive; EU: Iceberg Interactive
- Designer(s): Trevor Chan
- Programmer(s): Michael Wong; Gilbert Luis
- Artist(s): Li Kai
- Writer(s): Marwin So
- Platform(s): Windows, OS X
- Release: May 26, 2009 (PC); May 21, 2012 (OS X)
- Genre(s): Business simulation
- Mode(s): Single-player

Restaurant Empire II is the sequel to Restaurant Empire. It has new features such as new themes for American restaurants, over 700 pieces of new internal and external furniture and decorations, the addition of German cuisine and the city of Munich, and several others. The game has also been ported to Mac OS X by Virtual Programming, Ltd.

== Gameplay ==
The player controls the kind of cuisine the restaurant serves (American, French, Italian, German). Along with Munich, other cities include Los Angeles, Paris, and Rome.

As a new feature, the player can also own various kinds of restaurants, including a coffee shop and a dessert house. In the campaign mode, many new features have been added, such as organizing performance in your restaurant and changing the colors of the uniforms on your staff. Returning characters are Armand and Michel LeBoeuf, Delia Delecoeur, and Don Corleone. The campaign mode features a remade version of the campaign in the original Restaurant Empire. The game also focuses more on the managerial aspects of running a restaurant empire.

== Critical reception ==
Reception

Aggregate score
Aggregator	Score
Metacritic	64/100

Review score
Publication	Score
IGN	6.9/10

Reviews have been mixed, with praise for adding new content and keeping the game alive, but complaints about micromanagement and the recycled graphics.

Metacritic rates it as "Mixed or average reviews."
