= Seaman 2 =

2007 video game

- Developer(s): Vivarium Inc.
- Publisher(s): Sega
- Platform(s): PlayStation 2
- Release: JP: October 18, 2007
- Genre(s): Pet-raising simulation, god game
- Mode(s): Single-player

Seaman 2: Pekin Genjin Ikusei Kit (シーマン2 〜北京原人育成キット〜; lit. "Seaman 2: The Peking Man Rearing Kit") is a virtual pet video game for the PlayStation 2. It is the sequel to Seaman on the Dreamcast. In this game, players act as the god of a miniature island, charged with the task of rearing Gabo, a 20-centimeter tall Peking Man, communicating through a custom microphone-equipped gamepad.

== Gameplay ==
Seaman 2 plays much like the original Seaman, but instead of playing as an actual inhabitant, the player is much more of a god, with the ability to alter environments to give things to the island's inhabitants.

== Reception ==
Seaman 2 was the top-selling game during the week of its release in Japan at 33,000 copies. The game sold a total of 61,878 copies in the region in 2007.
