= Odama =

2006 video game

- North American box art
- Developers: Vivarium; Studiofake
- Publisher: Nintendo
- Director: Keiji Okayasu
- Producer: Yoot Saito
- Designers: Yoot Saito; Takuya Jinda
- Programmers: Shintarou Kawahara; Kanta Kobayashi; Tsuyoshi Inada; Takuya Oba
- Platform: GameCube
- Release: EU: March 31, 2006; NA: April 10, 2006; JP: April 13, 2006
- Genres: Pinball, real-time tactics
- Mode: Single-player

Odama (Note: Odama (大玉, Ōdama; lit. "Great Ball")) is a video game for the GameCube developed by Vivarium and Studiofake and published by Nintendo for the GameCube. The game was produced and designed by Seaman creator Yoot Saito. It is the penultimate GameCube game to be published by Nintendo, followed by The Legend of Zelda: Twilight Princess.

Odama blends tactical wargaming with pinball gameplay. The game takes place in a feudal Japan setting. The main character is a young general named Yamanouchi Kagetora, who is intent on avenging his father's death by reviving the most ingenious weapon ever to hit the medieval battlefield: the Odama. The Odama is a gigantic ball powerful enough to destroy whatever it strikes, friend or foe. Using giant flippers, players aim the Odama to bowl over enemies, shatter their defenses and wreak havoc on the battlefield. With the GameCube Microphone, players direct their soldiers out of the Odama's way and into the fray by charging the enemy, defending positions and seizing the enemy gates.

== Plot ==
The main character in Odama is Yamanouchi Kagetora, a young general struggling to avenge his clan and preserve the Way of Ninten-do, which is a philosophy that means "The way of heavenly duty". With this philosophy to guide him, he finds that his individual soldiers can band together to create a force strong enough to defeat even the most powerful enemy, a general named Karasuma Genshin. Genshin betrayed Lord Yamanouchi Nobutada, Kagetora's father, in a coup, leading Lord Nobutada to take his own life in order to avoid the shame of defeat. Kagetora exacts his revenge, using only limited resources against a vast army. One of these resources is a sacred object protected by his clan: a legendary weapon called the Odama.

== Gameplay ==
The player controls flippers, which operate exactly like those in a pinball game: they strike the Odama back into the battlefield, directing it into targets and away from soldiers. Between the two flippers, the commander stands guard, hacking down any soldiers who attempt to pass. Players can tilt the battlefield, allowing them to alter the course of the Odama. The goal is to shatter the enemy gates with the Odama and direct a crew of men carrying a giant bell to pass through the opened gates. Players' soldiers will defend their crew and seize enemy positions to protect their men on the mission.

The GameCube Microphone was included with the game. Using the Microphone, players direct soldiers by giving voice commands. There are 11 commands, ranging from generic (moving left and right, advancing and retreating) to map-specific and special moves.

== Development ==
Odama was developed by Vivarium and chiefly designed by Yoot Saito, the creator of Seaman for the Dreamcast. The actual development was outsourced to Studiofake, a company that is uncredited for its work save for director Keiji Okayasu. According to Nintendo producer Shigeru Miyamoto, the publisher was initially taken aback by the game's curious mix of pinball and real-time tactics and Saito's initial pitch, "I want to make a pinball game set in feudal Japan." However, Saito eventually convinced them after creating a demo of the game.

Odama debuted at the Electronic Entertainment Expo (E3) in 2004. This version of the game showcased the use of the DK Bongos, which allowed a second player to raise troop morale and distract enemy troops by repeatedly beating the drums. However, this feature was absent from its E3 showing the next year and dropped prior to the game's release.

== Reception ==
Reception

Aggregate score
Aggregator	Score
Metacritic	62 of 100

Review scores
Publication	Score
Edge	4 of 10
Electronic Gaming Monthly	5.83 of 10
Eurogamer	6 of 10
Famitsu	31 of 40
Game Informer	7 of 10
GamePro	4 of 5
GameRevolution	C+
GameSpot	6.6 of 10
GameSpy	3 of 5
GameTrailers	6.5 of 10
GameZone	6.5 of 10
IGN	6.5 of 10
Nintendo Power	8.5 of 10
The A.V. Club	C−
Detroit Free Press	3 of 4

Award
Publication	Award
IGN	2006 Most Innovative Design

The game received "mixed" reviews according to video game review aggregator website Metacritic. In Japan, Famitsu gave it a score of three eights and one seven for a total of 31 out of 40.

Odama won IGN's Most Innovative Design for a GameCube game in 2006.
