= Yoot Saito =

Japanese video game designer (born 1962)

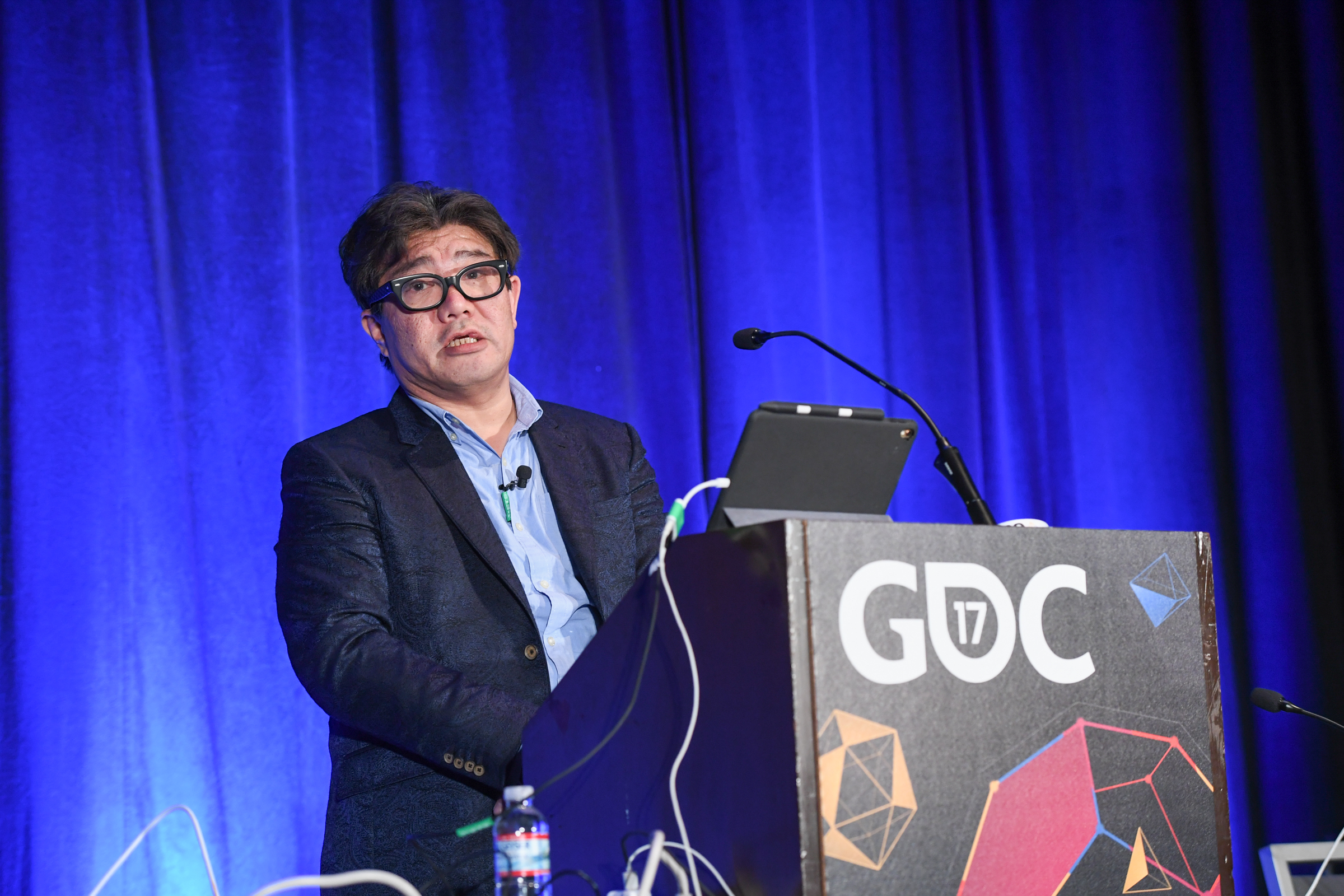
- Saito speaks at the 2017 Game Developers Conference.
- Born: October 15, 1962 (age 64); Japan
- Occupation: Video game designer
- Known for: SimTower; Seaman

Yutaka "Yoot" Saito (斉藤 由多加, Saitō Yutaka; born October 15, 1962) is a Japanese video game designer. In 1996, he founded the video game development company Vivarium. His latest game is Aero Porter, which is part of a collection of games called Guild01 for the Nintendo 3DS. Yoot also developed Odama for the GameCube and Seaman.

His first major game release was SimTower (known and originally released as The Tower in Japan), developed by his previous company OPeNBooK Co., Ltd. and published by Maxis in 1994. He was also involved in the sequel, Yoot Tower (The Tower II in Japan), the Game Boy Advance remake called The Tower SP, and the Nintendo DS remake called The Tower DS. After founding Vivarium, he published some of his most famous games, including Seaman, a virtual pet game which was one of the best selling titles for the Dreamcast in Japan, and Odama, a mix of pinball and real time strategy. Both of these games make use of their respective consoles' microphone peripherals.

== History ==
Yutaka Saitou studied at Komaba Touhou Junior High and High School , and later at Waseda University where he was enrolled in the department of science and engineering studying architecture. After graduating he joined recruitment agency Recruit. During his tenure there he published the independently developed the game, The Tower, which was licensed under the SimCity series and launched as SimTower abroad. The game became a worldwide hit, earning him the Codie award establishing Yutaka Saitou as a prominent game developer. Later he was also awarded the Nikkei BP's Venture of the Year award in the Young Entrepreneur category.

After leaving Recruit, he established his own game development company Vivarium, but continued to serve in an honorary fellow position at Recruit for 5 years. The first game developed by Vivarium was Seaman released for the Dreamcast. Seaman was a major hit on the console, becoming a cultural phenomenon even outside of the gaming world. Seaman was later ported to both PlayStation 2 and Windows, receiving multiple awards, including an Excellence Award for Interactive Art at the 1999 Japan Media Arts Festival[1], the DIME Trend award, and the Original Game Character of the Year award at GDC 2002. Yutaka Saitou currently serves as the representative director of both Vivarium and his earlier company OPeNBooK.

Yutaka Saitou was at one point considered a Mac Evangelist. He published "Under the Apple Tree" (Ringo no ki no shita de, 林檎の樹の下で) which details the turbulent events between the first Apple computer being imported into Japan and Apple Japan being established. He also published "The Secrets of Macintosh's creation" (Makkintosshu Tanjou no Hiwa, マッキントッシュ誕生の秘話), which features interviews with both the founding members and other core developers.

From 1999 to 2001, he served as an adviser to Sega, contributing to their corporate strategy. Following this, he developed the Nintendo GameCube game Odama, and in 2007, he released a successor to "Seaman" titled "Seaman 2."

He is also known for suggesting the addition of a speaker to the Wii controller after its initial announcement., and for being the writer of the exposition portion of the Ultraman Research Introduction (ウルトラマン研究序説).

He is an avid digital photographer, wielding a Leica M8 and Hasselblad 503CWD among others. He has spent some time living in America, where he goes by the name 'Yoot' Saito.

== Works ==
=== Video games ===
- SimTower (a.k.a. The Tower) (1994)
- Yoot Tower (1998)
- Seaman (1999)
- Seamail (cancelled)
- Mario Motors (cancelled)
- The Tower SP (2005)
- Odama (2006)
- Seaman 2 (2007)
- The Tower DS (2008)
- Aero Porter (2012)

=== Apps ===
- SimTower for iPhone
- Zhi Rie Shoudoroppa for iPhone
- Namagoe Gurupa for iPhone
- Tsunagarumeishi (Business Card Collector) for iPhone
- EarthBook

=== Literary works ===
- The Legend of Macintosh ISBN 4-7561-1634-5
- The Legend of Macintosh ISBN 4-9904-2521-9
- Ringo no ki no shita de: Appuru Nihonn Jyourikusitanoka ISBN 4-7561-1635-3
- Ringo no ki no shita de: Appuru Haikanishite Nihonn Ni Jyourikusitanoka ISBN 4-9904-2520-0
- Seaman Training Support Kit ISBN 4-7561-3572-2
- The True Birth of Macintosh ISBN 4-8399-0975-X
- The Price of Waiting 3 Minutes for a Hamburger ISBN 4-344-00860-X
- Machi no Boukenn Makku (Not for sale)

=== Television ===
- Present Day Closeup: The Brain of a Game Creator 1995 NHK
- Journalism Special 1996 TBS
- Futurism Announcement 1996 NHK
- 35 Years 1996 NHK
- News 23 1998 TBS
- Around When I Was a Child 2008 NHK

=== Related work ===
- Vivarium Inc.
