= Seven Kingdoms II: The Fryhtan Wars =

1999 video game

- Developer: Enlight
- Publisher: Ubi Soft
- Designer: Trevor Chan
- Platform: Windows
- Release: EU: October 1, 1999; NA: October 15, 1999; WW: February 4, 2015 (HD)
- Genre: Real-time strategy
- Modes: Single-player, multiplayer

Seven Kingdoms II: The Fryhtan Wars is a history-fantasy real-time strategy video game developed by Enlight, released in 1999. Seven Kingdoms II is the sequel to the original Seven Kingdoms game and its updated re-release Seven Kingdoms: Ancient Adversaries.

== Gameplay ==
Fryhtan Wars retains a great deal of concepts from its predecessors that distinguished it from other strategy games.

As was in the original, players must seek to strike a balance between a powerful army for defeating enemy Kingdoms and Kwyzans and a viable economy for sustaining the former. The definitive marks of Seven Kingdoms: Ancient Adversaries (SKAA) recur in Fryhtan Wars (SKFW); Gold, Food, Reputation, Population, Loyalty, and Espionage. The human population may be subdivided for various tasks; to produce food, to build, to research, to spy, to work in mines and factories, or to conscript into the army.

Both single player and multiplayer modes are available. The single player mode includes "random map" skirmishes, built-in scenarios, and a campaign game, which consists of a string of dynamically-generated scenarios.

== Civilizations ==
Seven Kingdoms II includes 12 human civilizations (Normans, Celts, Vikings, Greeks, Romans, Carthaginians, Egyptians, Persians, Indians, Chinese, Japanese and Mongols) and 7 Fryhtan species (Minotauros, Exovum, Kharshuf, Kerassos, Bregma, Grokken and Ezpinez). Besides unique military units with slightly varying attributes, human kingdoms also have unique gods with special powers that the kingdom may evoke from "seats of powers" that also grant unique bonuses. Differences among the three "basic" unit types, the bonuses associated with each particular Seat of Power, and the Greater Beings that may be evoked distinguish the different nationalities. In addition to basic human units, human civilizations can also build a variety of siege weapons, including cannons, ballistas, and catapults. These siege units do not possess a combat score, hence they all carry the same effectiveness from the moment they are created until the moment they are destroyed. However, siege weapons cost more to maintain and create.

Human kingdoms focus on population, diplomacy and economy, whereas Fryhtan kingdoms (known as Kwyzans) focus directly on military units backed by a very simplistic economy, with almost no diplomatic options and with no espionage. Compared to humans who can build a plethora of structures, including mines, factories, forts, camps and war factories, most Fryhtan species can only build two structures: the lair which breeds more Fryhtans and an additional structure associated with the unique capabilities of the species. Fryhtan kingdoms rely on enslaving human towns, which provide them gold, and killing units, which provides "life force" necessary to breed more Fryhtans. Human kingdoms often contain multiple nationalities, and likewise Fryhtan kingdoms can also contain multiple species. Kingdoms with significant numbers of both humans and Fryhtans are possible, but difficult, because reputation will cause human townspeople to rebel. If either enemy soldiers surrender to you, enemy kingdoms surrender to you, or civilians surrender to you, you will be able to build Human buildings and train soldiers, specialty units, spies and other units/building exclusive to Human kingdoms. This will cause the food source of the kingdom to go down, as Fryhtan kingdoms start off with low food supplies, so creating a "Tower of Science" and researching "Advanced Farming" is highly suggested.

== Open source project ==
Enlight released GPL source code in August 2009 for the original game Seven Kingdoms: Ancient Adversaries, and did the same for Seven Kingdoms II. However, the game data would not be released under the GPL. Enlight said that it was still making a profit through digital sales of the game. In the open source project supported by Enlight found at www.7kfans.com, a goal of the project would be to write a common engine to both games. The original game CD for Windows is required to install Seven Kingdoms II.

== Seven Kingdoms 2 HD ==
On December 16, 2014, Enlight announced Seven Kingdoms 2 had been green-light by Steam and they would be working on an upgrade dubbed Seven Kingdoms 2 HD. The upgraded version is said to support screen resolutions of up to 1920x1080 and introduce a new map mode that is 4 times as large as the original map. Enlight initially hoped to have the HD version implemented in two weeks. It was released on February 4, 2015.

== Reception ==
Reception

Aggregate score
Aggregator	Score
GameRankings	82%

Review scores
Publication	Score
AllGame	3.5/5
CNET Gamecenter	8/10
Computer Games Strategy Plus	4/5
Computer Gaming World	3.5/5
GamePro	4.5/5
GameRevolution	A−
GameSpot	9.1/10
GameSpy	87%
GameZone	8.9/10
IGN	8.6/10
PC Accelerator	8/10
PC Gamer (US)	90%

The game received "favorable" reviews according to the review aggregation website GameRankings.
