= Restaurant Empire =

2003 video game

- North American cover art
- Developer: Enlight Software
- Publisher: Enlight Software
- Designer: Trevor Chan
- Programmers: Eddy Chan; Gilbert Luis
- Artist: Anthony Ferrandiz
- Platform: Microsoft Windows
- Release: NA: March 2003; EU: 2003
- Genre: Business simulation
- Mode: Single-player

Restaurant Empire (simplified Chinese: 奇迹餐厅; traditional Chinese: 奇蹟餐廳; pinyin: Qí Jì Cān Tīng) is a 2003 business simulation video game created by Trevor Chan. Developed and published by Enlight Software for Microsoft Windows, the player owns, designs, and operates a restaurant.

== Gameplay ==
The player assumes the role of Armand LeBoeuf, a young chef who has recently taken over his uncle's restaurant. As the new owner, the player makes decisions on the kind of cuisine the restaurant serves (American, French, or Italian), what specific dishes go on the menu, and the staffing from the chef on down to the waiters, among other things. The ultimate goal of the game is to keep guests happy and make money at the same time.

The main gameplay mode features some story details and periodic minigames to flesh out the simulation. There is also a sandbox mode, which is basically freeform. Sandbox play removes many of the limitations the player faces in the main story mode, but there are no challenges either.

== Plot ==
In the game, a global culinary conglomerate, Omnifood, controls over 60% of the world's restaurants and is rapidly growing. The player must compete against Omnifood.

The player takes the role of Armand LeBeouf, a recent graduate from a French culinary school given the opportunity by his uncle to run his own restaurant. Later, the player is given the opportunity to attract investment capital and open more restaurants.

== Reception ==
Reception

Aggregate score
Aggregator	Score
Metacritic	76/100

Review scores
Publication	Score
Computer Games Magazine	4/5
Computer Gaming World	3/5
Game Informer	6.75/10
GameSpot	7.7/10
GameSpy	2/5
IGN	7.8/10
PC Gamer (US)	79%

The game received "generally favorable reviews" according to the review aggregation website Metacritic. It was criticized for its poor soundtrack, blurry textures, and blocky character models, but praised for overall good gameplay.

== Sequel ==
Enlight produced a sequel, Restaurant Empire II. Game publisher Paradox Interactive signed an agreement with Enlight to bring the game to stores in North America. The game's release was delayed over six times; it was finally released on May 26, 2009.

The new game has several new features, including the addition of German cuisine, as well as the city of Munich, as a location for the player to expand their restaurant chain.
