= Get in the Car, Loser! =

- Developer: Love Conquers All Games
- Publisher: Love Conquers All Games
- Designer: Christine Love
- Programmer: Christine Love
- Writer: Christine Love
- Composer: Christa Lee
- Platforms: Windows; Nintendo Switch
- Release: Windows; September 21, 2021; Switch; September 16, 2024
- Genre: Role-playing
- Mode: Single-player

Get in the Car, Loser! is a 2021 indie role-playing video game developed and published by Love Conquers All Games. It was released on September 21, 2021, for Windows, and in 2024 for the Nintendo Switch. It follows three lesbian adventurers and an angel as they go on a road trip in order to stop the evil Machine Devil from being resurrected and escape the Divine Order that seeks to capture them. The game has two downloadable content story packs, Battle on the Big Boardwalk and The Fate of Another World, which include new enemies and features. It received positive reviews from critics, citing the story, visuals, music and battle system.

== Development ==
The game was the first RPG developed by Christine Love, who had previously developed visual novels.

The game was released for the Nintendo Switch in September 2024.

== Reception ==
Sam Wachter of RPGamer rated the game 4/5 points, calling the battle system "serviceable", but not keyboard-friendly, and noted that it was easier to play with a controller. He also called the difficulty "unbalanced", with some acts being "trivial" while others were incredibly difficult. However, he praised the presentation as "fabulous", saying "a lot of the music absolutely slaps", and stating that the game's visuals had "a lot of punch to them".

Isaiah Colbert of Kotaku called the game "a trip worth taking", saying that the writing was "witty and deep" and the pixel art "evocative". While calling the game's early combat "repetitive", he stated that it "evolved into more challenging exchanges", and said that it was "ultimately pretty approachable". Natalie Clayton of PC Gamer said that the battles looked "slick as hell", with "gorgeous animations".
