= Capitalism (video game) =

1995 video game

- Developer: Enlight
- Publisher: Interactive Magic
- Designer: Trevor Chan
- Platforms: Mac OS, MS-DOS
- Release: October 31, 1995; January 1, 1996 (Capitalism Plus)
- Genre: Business simulation
- Mode: Single-player

Capitalism is a business simulation and economic strategy video game first published in 1995 by Interactive Magic, developed by Enlight for the Macintosh and MS-DOS and designed by Trevor Chan.

The aim of Capitalism is to become the most profitable business in the world while competing in several different markets against a number of different corporations. The player must run a business as the chief executive officer while preventing the business from going bankrupt or being bought out by a competitor.

A more advanced version was developed and released as Capitalism Plus on January 1, 1996, featuring world maps, more products and enhanced management capabilities which was published by Broderbund. A sequel was released entitled Capitalism II in 2001. An expanded version of Capitalism II, called Capitalism Lab, was released December 14, 2012.

== Gameplay ==
Capitalism is a simulation game which can be played in two different ways. The player may start their own business or play a scenario with a pre-made business with a set goal. In a new game, the player begins with a maximum of $200,000,000 initial capital. Each store can be stocked with up to four different items. As a real world model it is necessary to take into account land cost, overhead, demand for the products, and competition. The player can build several types of firms including department stores, factories, research and development centers, farms, mines, oil wells, and logging camps.

The most common business model to pursue in Capitalism is retail by running a chain of department stores. However, the player can venture into any market segment they want including manufacturing, which includes another set of considerations such as suppliers and raw material shortages. Manufacturing begins with building a factory and planning the internal operation layout of the structure. Purchasing, manufacturing, sales and advertising can all be used in factories.

The player can also choose to run research and development (R&D) operations as either their sole business or alongside running other operations such as department stores and factories. R&D ultimately improves the player's product quality by increasing technology gain. R&D for any product can last from 6 months to 10 years in the game, with the technology gain being higher when the R&D duration is increased. New products can also be produced using R&D.

== Scenarios ==
The scenario screen enables players to choose a scenario to play.

Capitalism includes seventeen scenarios with pre-made situations and businesses and a certain goal. The scenarios are generally more difficult to succeed as competitors often have the starting advantage. Each scenario has a different goal and different environment and competitor situation. For example, the Alternative Challenge scenario restricts the market to two cities while in "D" for Diversification the player must manage a profitable broad-based corporation and manage a large number of firms at the same time.

Some of the scenarios require the player to dominate a particular market in terms of market share. For example, Food Dominance sets a goal of dominating the food industry within 50 years while earning an annual operating profit of no less than $20 million. In Fortress of the Beverage King, the player must dethrone the Beverage King 'James Zandman' as the dominator of the beverage industry within 50 years.

Most scenario games disable the stock market option in an attempt to make the player focus on completing the scenario goals. The initial capital given in each scenario depends on the difficulty of the goals set. Each time a player successfully completes a scenario within the time limit set and with all goals reached, they will receive a bonus score and be added to the 'Hall of Fame' list.

== Other features ==
Capitalism includes many different features designed to reduce effort and save time in basic gameplay. From the main menu, players can use 'Quick Start' to choose from eight instructional games to learn about retailing, market analysis, farming, manufacturing, branding and advertising, research and development, raw material production and the stock market. These lessons are included in the game to introduce a new player to the concepts and basic gameplay.

Another feature of Capitalism is the layout plan library, which can store layout plans for all types of buildings available in the game. It enables the player to save previously used layout plans into a library as a record and then apply them to buildings to save time rather than creating new layout plans. Layout plans can be replaced, added, deleted or sorted.

== Capitalism Plus ==
Capitalism Plus retail box cover

A more advanced version of the original Capitalism was developed and released as Capitalism Plus on Jan 1, 1996 and published by Broderbund for Windows 95 only. It added world maps, more products and enhanced management capabilities to the game in addition to improved SVGA graphics, more markets to dominate and random events including riots, disease and technology breakthroughs. With Capitalism Plus, a map and scenario editor program was also added enabling players to configure products, industries, goals and other items. Capitalism Plus is compatible with Windows XP and Windows Vista.

== Reception ==
Reception

Review scores
Publication	Score
AllGame	3/5 (Plus)
GameRevolution	C− (Plus)
GameSpot	6.9/10; 7/10 (Plus)
Next Generation	4/5
PC Gamer (US)	89%
Computer Game Review	87/86/87
MacUser	4/5

Capitalism and its Capitalism Plus SKU together sold 150,000 copies by 2000.

Shortly after the release of Capitalism in 1995, a review in Next Generation commented, "The game is complex, but don't let the novel-sized manual fool you. It may be daunting at first, but this is one of those sims that you'll play for hours without even noticing." The reviewer scored it four out of five stars. Capitalism also made appearances on The Discovery Channel, and CNBC-TV Cable.

In 1996, Harvard University and Stanford University began using Capitalism for educational purposes. Professor Tom Kosnik said, "Capitalism is a world-class, hands-on learning experience I've used at Stanford School of Engineering and Harvard Business School. Gamers not only learn the subtleties of growing an entrepreneurial business but also learn about leadership and team building necessary in any business situation."

On October 21, 1996, BusinessWeek reviewed Capitalism, saying:

Capitalism isn't just for those who aspire to be the next Michael Dell or Sam Walton. It can be a fun and useful exercise for anyone who wants to test their entrepreneurial mettle without, for once, taking any risk. Players can choose to compete against computer-controlled rivals in four different industries: farming, manufacturing, raw material mining, and retailing. For a truly adventurous and time-consuming game, players can mix and match industries as captains of giant conglomerates. As in the real world, players compete locally, in one city, or fight it out on the global stage. With so many possibilities, Capitalism is an intense strategy game, much like chess, where players must constantly think ahead. As such, it could easily overwhelm novices. But by adjusting several factors — competency and managerial style of the computer-controlled rivals, for example, can be varied from very aggressive to conservative — gameplay can be suited to various styles and speed. The game even allows a player to hire presidents to manage the day-to-day operations of different divisions so the player can concentrate on the big picture.

In 1996, Computer Gaming World ranked Capitalism as the 6th most difficult game ever, calling its economy simulation "so thorough it should include a free MBA in every box." The magazine has also praised the game as highly enjoyable and addictive.

PC Gamer nominated Capitalism as the best simulation of 1995, although it lost to Apache.
