= Capitalism II =

2001 business simulation video game

- Developer: Enlight
- Publisher: Ubi Soft
- Designer: Trevor Chan
- Platforms: Microsoft Windows, Mac OS X
- Release: NA: December 17, 2001; EU: February 15, 2002
- Genre: Business simulation
- Modes: Single player, Multiplayer

Capitalism II in-game

Capitalism II is the sequel to the business simulation video game Capitalism. It was created by Enlight and published by Ubi Soft in 2001.

The player creates and controls a business empire. This in-depth strategy game covers almost every aspect of business that could be encountered in the real world, including marketing, manufacturing, purchasing, importing and retailing. It has two new campaigns (Capitalist Campaign and Entrepreneur Campaign) plus an in-depth tutorial.

The gameplay is very similar to the original version. One noticeable difference from the original Capitalism is that there are fewer products derived from agricultural resources.

Capitalism II will run on modern versions of Microsoft Windows whereas the previous versions would not.

Capitalism II has also been ported to Mac OS X by Virtual Programming.

A new expanded version of Capitalism II, called Capitalism Lab, was released on December 14, 2012. Capitalism Lab has many new features, improvements and a new concept of challenge games.

Subsequently, the following DLCs have been released for Capitalism Lab: Subsidiary DLC in 2014, City Economic Simulation DLC in 2016, Digital Age DLC in 2018, and Banking and Finance DLC in 2020.

== Reception ==
Reception

Aggregate score
| Aggregator | Score |
|---|---|
| Metacritic | 82/100 |

Review scores
| Publication | Score |
|---|---|
| Computer Games Magazine | 4.5/5 |
| Computer Gaming World | 3.5/5 |
| GameSpot | 8.5/10 |
| GameSpy | 83% |
| GameZone | 8/10 |
| IGN | 9/10 |
| Jeuxvideo.com | 14/20 |
| PC Gamer (UK) | 80% |
| PC Gamer (US) | 80% |
| PC Zone | 52% |

The game received "favorable" reviews according to the review aggregation website Metacritic.
