= Christine Love (writer) =

Canadian writer

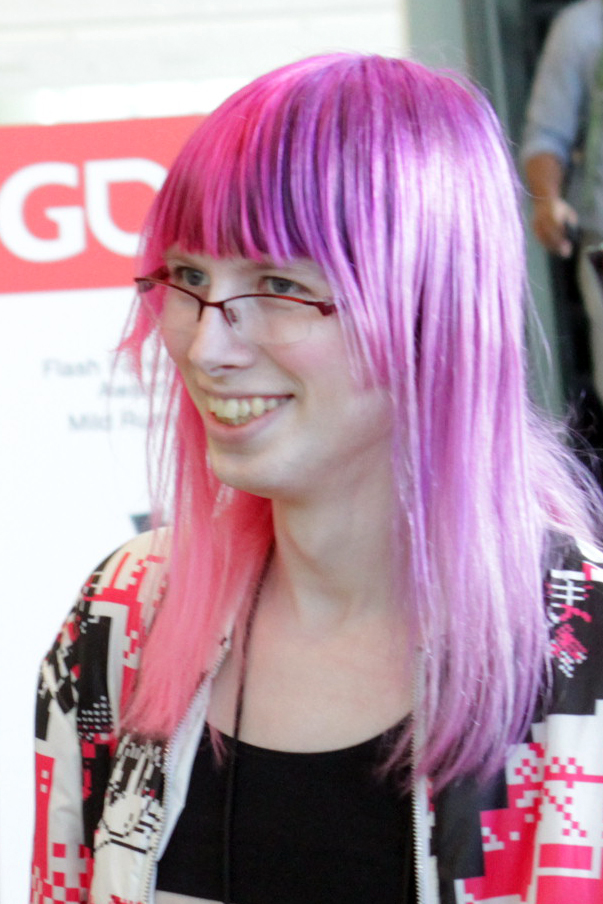
- Love at Game Developers Conference 2015
- Born: 10 December 1989 (age 36)
- Occupations: Writer, video game developer
- Known for: Visual novels
- Notable work: Digital: A Love Story (2010); Don't Take It Personally, Babe, It Just Ain't Your Story (2011); Analogue: A Hate Story (2012); Ladykiller in a Bind (2016)
- Website: http://www.loveconquersallgam.es

Christine Love (born 10 December 1989) is a Canadian independent video game developer and writer. Love began creating visual novels while in university, making a few small games, visual novels, and pieces of written fiction before coming into prominence with the release of Digital: A Love Story in 2010. She went on to work on Love and Order, a dating simulation by Italian video game designer Celso Riva, as well as her own Don't Take It Personally, Babe, It Just Ain't Your Story , both released in 2011. Her first commercial project on which she was the primary developer was Analogue: A Hate Story , released in February 2012; Love dropped out of her English degree during its development, and has since been a full-time game developer. She released an expansion to the game, titled Hate Plus, in 2013. In 2016, she released the visual novel Ladykiller in a Bind. Her latest video game is the 2021 Get in the Car, Loser!, a road trip role-playing game and her first non-visual novel, while her latest work and first novel is Star Sword Nemesis, self-published in 2025.

== Biography and career ==
Christine Love was born on 10 December 1989. She began creating visual novels while in school at Trent University. By January 2010, she had made a few small video games; written a novel and a few short stories, which she largely unsuccessfully tried to sell; and had made a visual novel each March for three consecutive years for NaNoRenO (National Ren'ai Game Writing Month), a month-long contest in the vein of National Novel Writing Month (NaNoWriMo) where developers attempt to create a visual novel in one month. In February 2010, she started a fourth visual novel, which resulted in Digital: A Love Story, her first game to receive widespread attention and acclaim. Love expected the game to reach as many people as her prior work, "a dozen or so people"; instead, the free game was noticed by video game publications and websites such as PC Gamer and Gamasutra and received much more attention, becoming what Love believes was "a defining point in [her] writing career". Digital earned an honourable mention in Gamasutra's "Best Indie Games of 2010" list.

After Digital, Love worked on her first commercial game project, Love and Order, a dating simulation by video game designer Riva Celso. She did writing and design work for the game, set in the Crown attorney's office in Montreal, which was released in February 2011. Love describes the game as "not really my best work," but its financial success led Love to believe that creating games and visual novels could be a full-time profession. In 2011, she spent the month of March working on another visual novel, don't take it personally, babe, it just ain't your story, which was released as a free download on 4 April 2011. The Daily Telegraph awarded the game "Best Script" in its video game awards of 2011.

In the summer of 2011, Love began working on a larger commercial game. She was beginning to believe that her games could be successful commercially, a belief supported by messages to that effect by fans of her previous works. The game, Analogue: A Hate Story, was released in February 2012. Love dropped out of university during the game's development in her fourth year of an English undergraduate degree. She felt that she was "not really learning a whole lot" and was unable to balance school and work on the game. Set centuries after Digital: A Love Story, the plot of Analogue revolves around an unnamed investigator, who is tasked with discovering the reason for an interstellar ship's disappearance once it reappears 600 years after "going dark". The game's themes focus similarly around human/computer interaction, interpersonal relationships, and LGBT issues. Although Analogue is a sequel "of sorts" to Digital, the time difference between the two games means that they are connected more in spirit than directly, similar to the connections between Digital and don't take it personally. Analogue sold over 40,000 copies by December 2012, and has inspired the release of a soundtrack album by the game's composer, Isaac Schankler, as well as a commercial expansion to the game, titled Hate Plus.

Along with her visual novels, Love has also developed a few games using the interactive fiction tool Twine. These games include Even Cowgirls Bleed, and Magical Maiden Madison. In 2016, Love released a new visual novel, Ladykiller in a Bind. She described the game as "an erotic visual novel about social manipulation and girls tying up other girls". Ladykiller in a Bind won the Excellence in Narrative award at the Independent Games Festival 2017. It was followed in 2021 by Get in the Car, Loser!, a role-playing game. It received positive reviews from RPGamer and Kotaku. In 2025, Love self-published a novel on Itch.io, Star Sword Nemesis, a science fiction romance story with illustrations by Max Schwartz.

== Influences and philosophy ==
Christine Love describes herself as "a writer first, and a game designer second", as writing was her initial goal. She originally pictured her future as that of a novelist, with a day job as a programmer to support herself. Love describes her games as being about "our relationship with technology, about human relationships in general, and about seeing things from different perspectives," as well as having "a ton of words". She strives for her stories to be true and sincere, but not necessarily realistic. Love said in 2013 that cuteness and sincerity were the most important things to her, and believes human beings should work together to make the world a cuter place. Love is also interested in the portrayal of gender and sexuality in video games; in Digital and Analogue, she was careful to avoid mentioning or assuming the gender of the player or the character they control, though the love interests in the games are female. Privately, however, she thinks of them as female, as her intention was to create games that could be easily appreciated by queer people such as herself, without having to project themselves onto a relationship that did not match up to their perceptions. Love believes that indie games have "more meaningful depictions of queer experiences" than those from larger studios.

== Works ==
- Digital: A Love Story (2010)
- Love and Order (2011)
- don't take it personally, babe, it just ain't your story (2011)
- Analogue: A Hate Story (2012)
- Hate Plus (2013)
- Interstellar Selfie Station (2014)
- Ladykiller in a Bind (2016)
- Get in the Car, Loser! (2021)
