= Yoot Tower =

1998 video game

- Developer: OPeNBooK9003
- Publishers: NA: Sega; JP: OPeNBooK9003
- Designer: Yoot Saito
- Platforms: Mac OS, Windows 95
- Release: November 24, 1998
- Genre: Construction and management simulation
- Mode: Single player

Yoot Tower (known in Japan as The Tower II) is a 1998 construction and management simulation computer game. The game is a sequel to SimTower.

The lead designer, Yoot Saito, who also worked on SimTower, produced this game as a sequel to SimTower, adding several new features while retaining the same general interface and style. The game's premise is largely unchanged from its predecessor; players must build a profitable and unique tower block complete with various amenities and living accommodations, while balancing the needs of the occupants.

== Gameplay ==
Exiting from basement shops to the lobby

Using the provided starting funds, players must begin to build a tower from scratch. As in SimTower, offices and food courts can be built to generate income, as well as condos that can be sold to families. There are plenty of new facilities that can be placed such as rented apartments, vending machines and public restrooms for food court patrons. There are also many changes to existing items that featured in the original game, i.e. a notable difference between the shop item in Yoot Tower and the one originally in SimTower is that it no longer functions as a rented space where the player has no control over what the shop sells; rather the player is provided with different types of shop from the start from which the income they make is part of the player's earnings. Another interesting addition is the ability for players to build two or more towers next to each other and join them with sky bridges. Other income sources also exist, such as placing billboards outside and renting them out as advertisement space.

Also new to this game is the ability to choose where the building is built. What the player can do in these locations varies, such as how many stories high the building can be, what the player is actually allowed to build, and how much money the player starts off with. The variation gives each location its own difficulty level compared to the others.

Yoot Tower includes a non-invasive form of static in-game advertising. Users can place billboards for Apple Computer (in Mac version only) and Sega, whilst there are tenants featuring real-world stores like GameWorks, Orange Julius or Air Jamaica. Some updates include more real-world tenants and billboards. The Japanese version includes a Glico store.

The Tower II is a fully 32-bit program unlike SimTower, which was 16-bit. It can even run on all 64-bit Windows operating systems. The Tower II also has a resizable window that can support very high resolutions (3200 x 2160).

== Expansions ==
A new addition of the game is the ability to expand the game using plug-ins released for download that would add new features, such as new facilities (e.g. additional shops, restaurants, and services, ranging from a Glico store to a swimming pool), new events, billboards, and movies, as well as other aspects of gameplay. Inspection of the game's official website through web archives indicates that, although the American version never got any true additions, the Japanese version got several updates, including new movies and locations. None of these appear to have survived when the official websites relating to the game and its developer OPeNBooK9003 went offline between the years 2001 and 2002. Through translations on the Japanese downloads page, an Austin Powers movie can be downloaded.

The original Tower II game came with Tokyo and Hawaii. The American version had Tokyo, Hawaii, and Kegon Falls. Unlike in Japan, however, America did not get updates. In Japan, each expansion pack was sold under the Towerkit title.

== Locations ==
=== Waikiki, Hawaii ===
The easiest of the three scenarios, Hawaii has users building a mixed-use structure featuring condominia and hotels. After building up those plus an underground shopping mall, users can place a cathedral on the top floor (the 45th).

=== Tokyo, Japan ===
The advanced Tokyo level has users building a fast-paced tower with primarily offices and eventually other uses as well. Users place a stadium on the top level.

=== Kegon Falls ===
In this scenario, the player is required to construct mostly underground, building a vast underground tourist attraction through hotels, shops, and a museum. This was initially sold in Japan as an expansion, but is included in Yoot Tower and later The Tower II releases.

=== Statue of Liberty ===
This expansion, was released in Japan in February 1999 under the name Towerkit CD-ROM: The Statue of Liberty. It was also originally meant to be available to download from the American official website, but the English version never materialized. The expansion is rare in Japan.

=== Tokyo Tower ===
In this game, player build below Tokyo Tower. Yoot Saito also indicated the Tower team was working on another location, "Tokyo Tower", but the addition was only released in Japan as Towerkit. This is not to be confused with the "Tokyo" location.

=== Kyoto Station Bldg. ===
The Kyoto Station was launched as a product based on the Gamera 3: Awakening of Irys movie. This version was sold as Towerkit, or bundled with the base The Tower II game.

=== King Naniwa Building Legend ===
In this add-on, player built around Tsutenkaku.

This version was sold as Towerkit, or bundled with the base The Tower II game.

=== Christmas Story ===
In this add-on, officially titled The Tower II - Christmas Story ～サンタクロースになれる聖夜～, the player constructs a log building and collects Christmas-themed items whilst Santa can be spotted walking around.

This version was sold as Towerkit and the rarest and most obscure of the released items.

=== Cancelled releases ===
- Lunar base
- Luxury cruise ship
- Hokkaidō

== Reception ==
Reception

Review scores
| Publication | Score |
|---|---|
| GamePro | 2.5/5 |
| Computer Games Strategy Plus | 3/5 |
| Inside Mac Games | 4/5 |
| IGN | 7.8/10 |
