= SimTower =

1994 video game

SimTower: The Vertical Empire
- Developer: OPeNBooK
- Publishers: JP: OPeNBooK; NA/EU: Maxis
- Director: Yoot Saito
- Series: Sim
- Platforms: Windows, Macintosh, Saturn, 3DO, PlayStation
- Release: Windows, Mac: JP: 1994; NA: November 1994; EU: 1994; Sega Saturn: JP: March 1, 1996; 3DO: JP: March 29, 1996; PlayStation: JP: November 1, 1996
- Genre: Construction and management simulation
- Mode: Single-player

SimTower: The Vertical Empire (originally published in Japan as The Tower (Note: Japanese: ザ・タワー, Hepburn: Za Tawā)) is a construction and management simulation video game developed by OPeNBooK and released in 1994 for Microsoft Windows and Macintosh System 7. Outside Japan, the game was published by Maxis and branded as part of their Sim series. Ports for Sega Saturn, 3DO and PlayStation were released in 1996. A sequel titled The Tower II was released in 1998 and called Yoot Tower outside Japan.

The game allows players to build and manage a tower and decide what facilities to place in it, in order to ultimately build a five-star tower. Random events take place during play, such as terrorist acts that the player must respond to immediately.

Critical reception towards the game was generally positive. Reviews praised the game's formula, including its open-ended nature and its ability to immerse the player into the game. Criticism targeted the game's lack of documentation, which some reviewers found made it harder to learn how to play the game. The in-game speed was also criticized for being too slow, which was a crucial issue in the game because time must pass for the player to earn income to purchase new facilities.

== Gameplay ==
The player views a cross-section of the building from the side.

SimTower allows the player to build and manage the operations of a modern, multi-use skyscraper. They must plan where to place facilities in the tower that include restaurants, condominiums, offices, hotel rooms, retail stores and elevators. To prevent tenants from vacating their properties, the player must keep their stress low by fulfilling their demands for medical centers, parking lots, recycling facilities, clean hotel rooms staffed with housekeepers, and an efficient transportation system, which involves managing elevator traffic. SimTower, which was built around an elevator simulation program, places a strong emphasis on good elevator management.

The game begins with a one-star tower with limited building options. To increase the tower's star rating, it must attract more tenants by providing more living space (or office space, and later in the game, hotel and various types of commercial space). New facilities are made available while the tower progresses from a one-star rating to a five-star rating. The highest achievable rating is the designation of "Tower" which can only be awarded by building a cathedral at the very top of a five-star building with all possible tower levels above ground developed. The tower is limited to a maximum of 100 floors above ground and nine stories below ground. Standard elevators, which can span a maximum of 30 floors, and express elevators, which can span the entire height of the building, must be used efficiently to decrease tenant stress.

Certain events can take place in the course of managing the tower. For example, terrorists may phone the player to let them know that they have hidden a bomb in the building, and that they demand a ransom. If the ransom is not paid, then security services must find the bomb before it detonates, or else the tower will incur significant damages. If the player builds facilities underground, the game may notify them that their workers have discovered gold treasure, which gives the player a significant amount of funds. At random intervals during the game, there are notifications that state that a VIP will be visiting the tower soon, so the player must prepare for their visit. If the VIP enjoys their visit because of variables such as a comfortable hotel suite and efficient navigation, the VIP will give the tower a favorable rating. A favorable rating would then allow the tower to advance to the next star level, assuming the other qualifications are met. Although it does not have any impact on the tower, at the end of the fourth quarter every year in the game, Santa Claus and his reindeer fly across the tower.

== Development ==
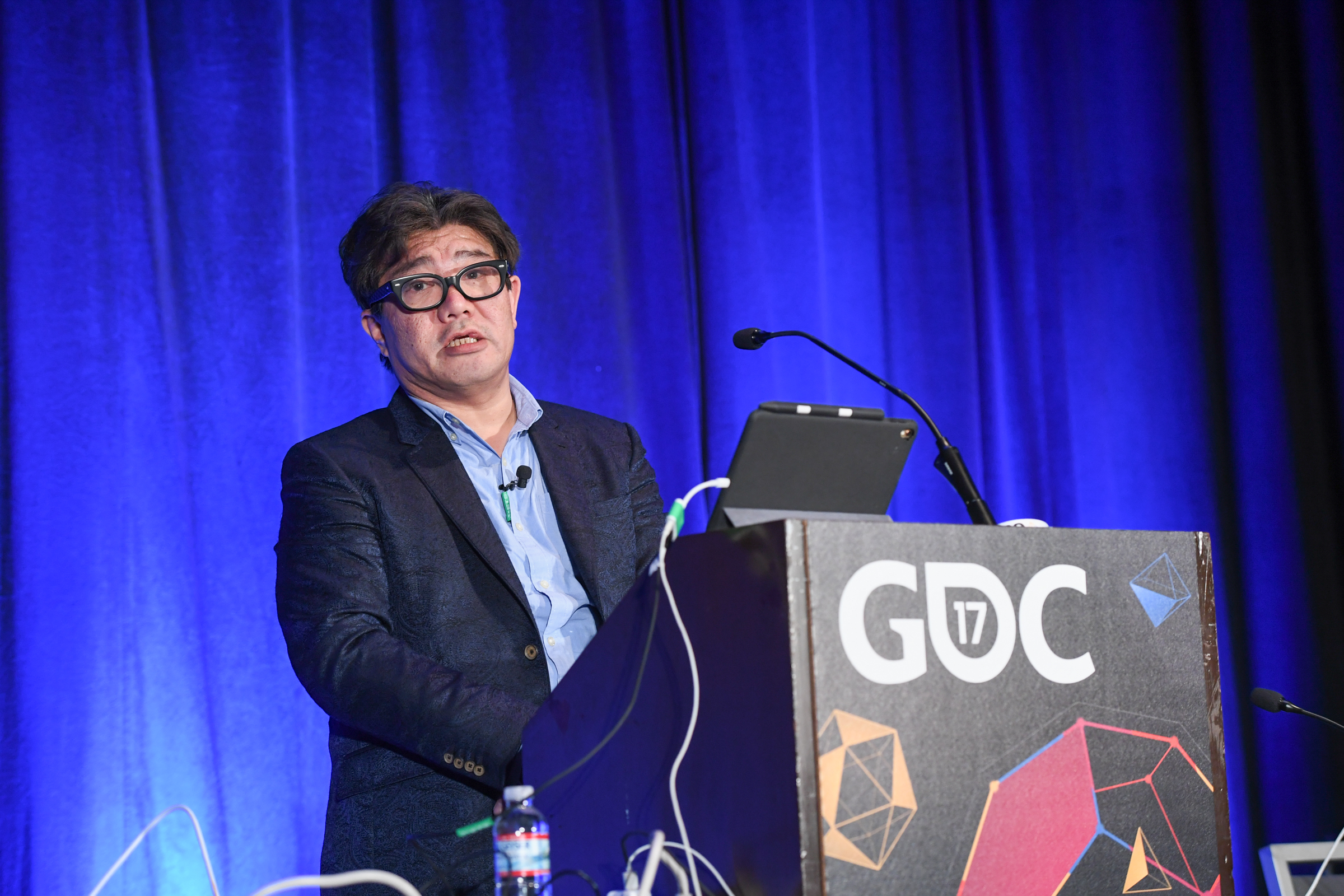
Developer Yoot Saito (shown in 2017) contacted an elevator company to research the game's mechanics.

Developed by Yoot Saito of OPeNBooK, SimTower was originally titled The Tower. It works on computers running the Microsoft Windows or Macintosh System 7 operating systems; the game will operate on 68k-based Macs at a minimum. It requires 8-bit colors and four megabytes of random-access memory. Graphics and sounds used in SimTower are similar to those of previous Sim games, and high-resolution graphics are also used. The sound effects are kept to a minimum; noises that are played in the background include office "buzz" and elevator bells.

While attending Waseda University, Saito played SimCity on the Macintosh, which prompted him to pursue video game creation after graduating. His first game was a simulation title that was part of a future media project for a publishing house. When Saito asked to develop a second, the business refused because it was not a video game company. He left the company to personally produce the second game, which built on ideas he conceived while working on his first: elevators and towers. Saito teamed up with freelance programmer Takumi Abe to complete the project. To research the gameplay, Saito contacted an elevator company to learn about elevator scheduling and management. However, the company declined to provide the information. Saito handled the graphic design, starting with a monochromatic scaled tower created in HyperCard. The designer added color to differentiate between office- and hotel-type buildings. As development neared completion, Saito noticed that the Mac's performance had improved and decided to increase the color palette size from 16 to 256 colors. Saito enlisted a second designer to produce animation for the graphics and improve the details for the color increase.

== Release and reception ==
Reception

Review scores
Publication	Score
AllGame	4/5
Dragon	3 & 3 1/2 of 5
Next Generation	2/5 (MAC)
Entertainment Weekly	B−

SimTower was successful in Japan, earning the developers a profit. The Nihon Keizai Shimbun awarded Saito the "Best Young Manager/Venture of the Year" for his work on the game. After the initial Japanese release, Maxis president Jeff Braun contacted Saito regarding a worldwide release; SimCity creator Will Wright had informed Braun of the game. The company localized the game for sale in the United States, and changed the name to capitalize on the popularity of the Sim franchise and increase sales figures. Maxis published SimTower for the Windows and Macintosh System 7 operating systems in November 1994 in the United States. In 1996, it was ported to the Sega Saturn, 3DO Interactive Multiplayer and PlayStation in Japan.

The South China Morning Post praised the game's formula, noting that it followed in the footsteps of previous open-ended Maxis games. Comparing SimTower to SimCity 2000, the review remarked that it was more interesting to watch people live out their lives in a tower rather than to observe cars moving around. They also appreciated the "homely" feeling of SimTower, in contrast with other Sim games such as SimEarth and SimLife, which they felt were too universal to take on a personal identity. Benjamin Svetkey of Entertainment Weekly praised the game and commented that it is "more fun than [the concept] sounds". However, he stated that the gameplay may be too much for fans of the series. A reviewer for Next Generation panned the game, saying it lacks the bustling interactivity of previous games in the Sim franchise: "There are bug infestations and the occasional fire with which to deal, but most of the time, SimTower sees you standing around waiting for cash reserves to grow in order to add more floors. Not much fun at all." Australia's The Age found SimTower a pleasing return to form for Maxis, after the release of the disappointing SimFarm. Lisa Karen Savignano of Allgame stated that the game had decent graphics and sound. However, she also felt that SimTower had good replay value due to the non-linear gameplay, giving the game four stars out of five.

The game was criticized by the South China Morning Post for lacking documentation, making it more difficult to learn how to play the game. They also predicted that players would be unhappy with the game's speed, as time plays an important role in earning money from tenants. Before the player can purchase new facilities, a long period of time must pass before income is earned from tenants. The newspaper was also unhappy with complaints from tenants; specific reasons for their dissatisfaction are never given. The Age was disappointed by the lack of pre-built towers and scenarios, suggesting that one along the lines of The Towering Inferno's plot could have been included. Game Informer referred to SimTower as a "lesser-known" simulation game, and described it as "fun and addictive". Writing for the San Diego Union-Tribune, Matt Miller felt that, when compared to SimCity 2000 (1993), gameplay in SimTower moved slowly. He also disliked the moments when he had to wait several minutes to pass by before he could make enough money to purchase new additions for his building. Dragon magazine's reviewers Jay and Dee praised the visuals and gameplay. However, the two commented that the game can feel slow because it lacks gameplay elements and options present in other strategy games. In 1995, the Software and Information Industry Association listed SimTower as the "Best Simulation Program" in the Consumer software category of their annual Codie awards.

The game was followed by Yoot Tower (called The Tower II in Japan), also designed by Yoot Saito, which was initially released on November 24, 1998, for the Macintosh. It was later made available for the Windows operating systems in January 1999. Yoot Tower's gameplay is similar to that of SimTower—players build hotels, resorts, and office buildings, and work towards building a five-star tower. Vivarium launched a version of SimTower for the Game Boy Advance, called The Tower SP, published by Nintendo in Japan on April 28, 2005, and by Sega in the United States on March 15, 2006. A version of SimTower called The Tower DS was published by DigiToys in Japan on June 26, 2008. Yoot Tower was also released for iPad devices via the online iOS App Store.

== See also ==
- Project Highrise
