= Project Highrise =

2016 video game

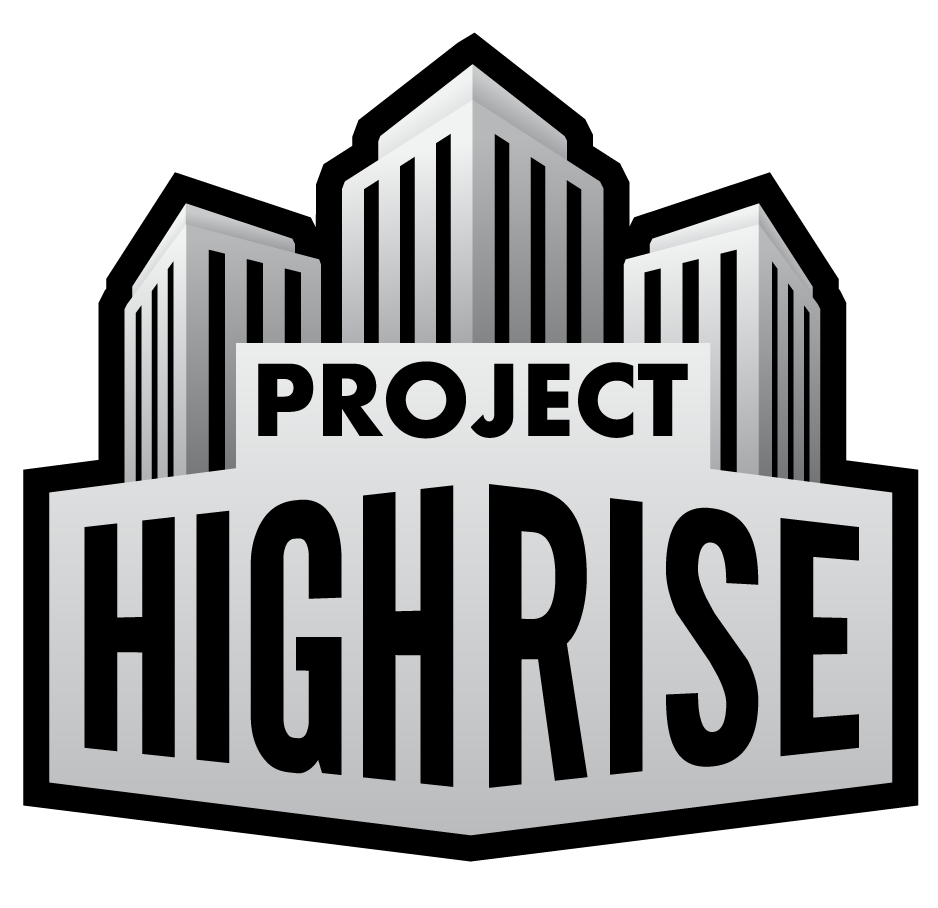
- Project Highrise logo
- Developer: SomaSim
- Publishers: Kasedo Games (PC); Kalypso Media
- Producer: Andrew McKerrow
- Designer: Matthew Viglione
- Programmer: Robert Zubek
- Artists: Eddie Einikis; Kevin Paskowski
- Composer: Brian Block
- Platforms: Windows; OS X; Android; iOS; Nintendo Switch; PlayStation 4; Xbox One
- Release: September 8, 2016: Windows, OS X; WW: September 8, 2016; Android, iOS; WW: April 12, 2018; Xbox One; NA: October 23, 2018; PAL: October 26, 2018; Nintendo Switch, PlayStation 4; PAL: October 26, 2018; NA: November 13, 2018
- Genre: City-building
- Mode: Single-player

Project Highrise is a 2D tower-building simulation game, developed by SomaSim and published by Kasedo Games. It is considered by many to be the spiritual successor to SimTower. In the game, players take on the role of a high-rise manager who is responsible for building and maintaining a tower block, filling it with offices, apartments, shops and restaurants, which they support with utilities, while providing specialized services and fulfilling certain conditions in order to keep the residents and tenants of the building satisfied.

The game was released worldwide on September 8, 2016, through online digital distribution platforms, and has received generally positive reviews. The game has spawned five DLC packs, which provided additional gameplay features and content.

== Reception ==
Reception

Aggregate score
Aggregator	Score
Metacritic	PC: 73/100 iOS: 84/100; XONE: 74/100; NS: 74/100

Review scores
Publication	Score
IGN	7/10
IGN Germany	8/10
TouchArcade	iOS: 4/5

Project Highrise has a score of 73/100 on Metacritic. The game garnering a 7 out of 10 review score from IGN, and an 8 out of 10 from IGN Germany. IGN praised Project Highrise for being able to quickly and easily craft a smooth, self-sufficient system from the ground up thanks to a welcoming and fast-paced simplicity, and Rock, Paper, Shotgun called the ability for the player to easily understand what was going on, despite the deep levels of complexity, the game's biggest achievement.

Despite the praise, Project Highrise was also criticized for its lack of personality due to its artistic style and color palette. The way each room looked was thought to be too similar and as such, larger skyscrapers could look monotonous.
