= Analogue: A Hate Story =

2012 video game

- Analogue header on Steam
- Developer: Love Conquers All Games
- Designer: Christine Love
- Artist: Raide
- Writer: Christine Love
- Composer: Isaac Schankler
- Engine: Ren'Py
- Platforms: Windows; MacOS; Linux
- Release: February 1, 2012
- Genre: Visual novel
- Mode: Single-player

Analogue: A Hate Story (Korean: 아날로그: 어 헤이트 스토리) is a visual novel created by independent designer and visual novelist Christine Love. It was created with the Ren'Py engine, and was first released for download on the author's website in February 2012. A sequel set centuries after Love's earlier work, Digital: A Love Story (2010), Analogue revolves around an unnamed investigator, who is tasked with discovering the reason for an interstellar ship's disappearance once it reappears after 600 years. The game's themes focus similarly around human/computer interaction, interpersonal relationships, and LGBT issues; but focus primarily on "transhumanism, traditional marriage, loneliness and cosplay."

Analogue has a word count of about 59,000.

== Gameplay ==
The game's primary interface, featuring one of the two primary characters, the AI *Hyun-ae

Analogue: A Hate Story is a visual novel featuring semi-static manga-style character images, and focused on reading text logs. Using the mouse and keyboard, the player interacts with the Mugunghwa's main computer to read log entries, communicate with the AIs, and occasionally enter commands directly into the vessel's computer system. At any time in the game, the player can save their game, adjust options, etc.

The main user interface allows the player to read through various diaries and letters that reveal the game's backstory and insight into its many (deceased) characters. For the most part, navigating this interface is similar to navigating a basic e-mail system, in that messages are chronologically arranged and searchable. They are grouped in usually numbered "blocks", released to the player by *Hyun-ae or *Mute throughout the game. For the most part, the AIs release blocks "out of order", or do not release all entries in a block, forcing the player to assemble the timeline of events out of what clues they have, and draw certain conclusions independently until (or if) the AIs can be convinced to be more forthcoming. In most cases, the player can, after reading a log entry, show its content to the currently active AI. This is the primary process by which additional information and message blocks are revealed. Players can also type in an entry's alphanumeric ID in the main log menu to obtain it directly, as long as its corresponding block is decrypted.

Communication with *Hyun-ae and *Mute is limited to choosing responses to yes–no questions. In the game, *Hyun-ae explains that the ship's disrepair may have led to the language parsing systems to malfunction, forcing her to put the interface together from scratch. Though *Hyun-ae and *Mute almost never communicate directly, the player can act as a go-between, taking a list of direct questions from *Mute to *Hyun-ae. This is a major turning point in the game, as the player not only receives answers to the questions, but has occasional opportunities to voice a third opinion on the events that led to the Mugunghwa's current state. The player can also access the Mugunghwa's override terminal, which can be used to decrypt data log blocks, switch between AI, change costumes for *Hyun-ae, adjust the behavior of some ship systems (a key aspect for the meltdown sequence), and more. The override terminal works like a basic text parser system similar to Unix shell commands, accepting only a very limited vocabulary of instructions that must be typed directly and correctly.

Due to the branching nature of the story, the game must be played more than once to unlock all logs to complete the game, as it is impossible to reveal all log entries and information from the AIs in one playthrough. A log system separate from the game's save files displays all discovered logs from all playthroughs, effectively tracking the player's overall completion.

== Plot ==
=== Setting and characters ===
Set several thousand years in the future, Analogue revolves around the Mugunghwa (Korean: 무궁화), a generation ship that lost contact with Earth some 600 years prior to the events of the game. For reasons initially unclear, society aboard the ship had degraded from that of modern, 21st Century South Korea, to the intensely patriarchal culture of the medieval Joseon Dynasty. In the process, the ship's clocks were reset to year 1, and the colonists began using Hanja characters to read and write. The reasons for why such a cultural shift has occurred is lost to time, leaving the player to formulate the cause on their own. Over the three centuries after the shift, the ship's birth rates began to gradually decline, to below the "replacement rate" of noble families. By year 322, the ship inexplicably went dark, falling into a state of severe disrepair.

In Analogue's present, 622 years later, the Mugunghwa is discovered in orbit above Antares B, a star system en route to its destination. A friend of the protagonist's, a dispatch officer, is the one who discovers the ship on their radar; this catches the attention of the Saeju Colony Historical Society (which suggests that humans have established planetary colonies beyond Earth), who sponsors the recovery of any remaining text logs that can explain the ship's disappearance. The dispatch officer gives the unnamed silent protagonist, an independent investigator, this "job" in the introduction message for its isolation from social situations; this implies that the protagonist is somewhat asocial, but beyond this their personality and background is based almost entirely upon the player's decisions. The protagonist encounters two AI cores within the ship's computer. The first, *Hyun-ae (Korean: 현애; RR: Hyeon-ae), is a bright, cheerful girl who loves cosplay, and is highly curious about the player and the future they come from. The other, *Mute, is the ship's security AI and self-proclaimed "social creature", who outranked all but Emperor Ryu, her master and Captain of the ship. The AIs dislike one another intensely, apparently due to the event that led to the ship's demise. The logs the player must recover are written by members of the Imperial Ryu family, the noble Kim and Smith families, and those linked to them. The game relies heavily on this unreliable narrator mechanic, where the AI characters and log entries thematically withhold key information from the player in order to add to the importance of certain elements of the plot (e.g. the administrator password to the ship's computer).

=== Story ===
In Analogue's introductory cutscene, the protagonist receives a message from a colleague, who tasks them with accessing the text logs aboard the Mugunghwa, and download as many as possible, as sponsored by the Saeju Colony Historical Society. After enabling the system AI using a Linux-style terminal, *Hyun-ae greets the player, pleasantly shocked to find an external connection. She expresses her gratitude to the player for contacting the ship "after so many years", and promises that she will do her utmost to help access the logs.

As the player reads the logs, *Hyun-ae provides commentary on the letters and diaries of the late inhabitants of the Mugunghwa. A key series of logs discovered with *Hyun-ae is the diary of the Pale Bride, a sick girl on the ship who was placed in stasis so her compromised immune system could be cured by future medical technology not available during her lifetime. The Pale Bride was brought out of stasis many years later by the descendants of her immediate family, the Kim family, in order to serve as a fertile young bride to Emperor Ryu In-ho, captain of the Mugunghwa. She found herself in a culturally reverted, deeply misogynistic society, writing that "[e]veryone's so uneducated and stupid". The Pale Bride, accustomed to the more liberal society of her own time, has difficulty assimilating with this reverted culture, and often describes youthful rebellions in her diary entries.

After giving the player a key entry from the Pale Bride's diary, *Hyun-ae reveals that she is the AI form of the Pale Bride, and asks the player to decrypt a block of restricted data by entering the override terminal in super-user mode (accessible only by entering a certain password). While attempting to do so, the player encounters a corrupted AI core and is forced to restore it to proceed. This activates *Mute, who reveals that *Hyun-ae may be linked to the ship's demise by referring to her as "that murderous bitch". As only one of the AIs can be active at a time (determined by keying in Linux-like terminal commands), the path through the story and the revelations contained within the many logs and messages branch based on decisions made by the player - most relevantly, which AI receives the most attention.

Upon reaching one of two criteria (obtaining a certain percentage of the games logs, or showing *Hyun-ae any one of *Mute's questions), the game's main climax occurs—the Mugunghwa's nuclear fission reactor enters meltdown, endangering the AI cores, valuable data, and the protagonist. The player must execute a series of commands to safely shutdown the reactor and vent out residual heat, all within 20 minutes. The player must choose which AIs they will continue the story with prior to meltdown; leaving their separate cores on consumes too much power for the backup power system, and it is not possible to activate the dormant AI from this point onwards. Once the player has safely disabled the reactor, saving the life of the active AI, the game will continue similarly to before, with the player accessing logs and the surviving AI providing commentary. Each AI reveals a different side of the Mugunghwa's story: *Hyun-ae will assist in uncovering the Pale Bride's perspective, while *Mute yields logs from the noble families of the ship. More interaction will take place between the player and the AI, until a pivot is reached with the relationship and one of the five endings will occur.

Eventually, it is revealed that the Pale Bride (now *Hyun-ae) was brutally treated by the Kim family after they awoke her from stasis. After many small rebellions and increasingly serious punishments, going so far as to refusing to be wed to Emperor Ryu, to whom she had been promised as a bride and concubine, her adoptive parents cut out her tongue to prevent the young girl from speaking out against men (a trauma *Mute was unaware of to the game's present). After her marriage, Hyun-ae became close friends with the Emperor's first wife, Empress Ryu Jae-hwa. She calls her "stronger than I ever was", not letting men order her around "while still knowing her place"; as well as the only person to notice Hyun-ae's muteness and failing health. Upon the Empress's sudden death, Hyun-ae's sorrow and rage ultimately drove her to kill everyone she hated aboard the Mugunghwa by deactivating its life support systems. As the crew suffocated to death, she retreated into the computer system as an AI by using a "neurosynaptic" scan of her brain and a copy of *Mute's AI coding, which she used to deactivate the security AI up until Analogue's present. This explains the *Hyun-ae's hatred of the Kims, *Mute's hatred of *Hyun-ae, and acts as a key factor for the player's decisions.

The first two endings involve *Hyun-ae leaving the Mugunghwa with the protagonist, either as a companion or lover. In the third ending, the protagonist leaves without taking either AI with them (either by not saving the ship from meltdown in time, or by prematurely downloading the logs before the end of the AI commentary has been reached). This conclusion can also be reached if the player opts not to download the AI data during the final conclusion. The fourth ending involves "kidnapping" *Mute, effectively relieving her of her duties on the ship. The fifth ending, which can only be accessed by "cheating" (searching manually for a log which would not normally appear on the story branch in question), involves taking both AIs as a harem. The game can also end by penalty for disagreeing too much with an AI, causing the angered AI to permanently disconnect the protagonist from the ship's computer, or by the "bad priorities" ending, which occurs when the player downloads the logs during the meltdown sequence, which takes too much time, killing them in the explosion.

== Development and release ==
When looking for a setting to place Analogue, Christine Love settled on Korea's Joseon Dynasty, saying that it had "always fascinated me the most for a number of reasons, not all of them negative." Among those reasons was how women were dehumanizingly treated when compared to the Goryeo Dynasty. "The plot is moved mostly by the Pale Bride, the modern girl who can't understand what's going on…but the crux of it, really, was trying to get into the heads of everyone else[:] the men and women who have internalized all these awful misogynist ideals and take them completely for granted as the way things are. So the story really just formed itself around that question: what would it be like to be a woman in that society? History didn't care about the answer, but I do. The rest—the modern-thinking woman who can't possibly survive [*Hyun-ae], the women who are forced to navigate family politics, the men who are complicit in this whole system but can't just be dismissed as bad people [Smith]—all came naturally in that attempt to answer it."

Love had mixed feelings about the AI characters during development. For instance, *Hyun-ae, as the Pale Bride, underwent almost no change from being a girl of modern times who couldn't understand the society she was thrust into. *Mute, apart from her position as the ship's security AI, was an unknown with, as Love stated, "how she'd end up turning out." As *Mute's "cheerful misogyny" began to define itself through her dialog, however, Love "started to hate her, especially with every line I wrote… Then she started to grow on me[. I]t was never really her fault she was like that[;] it was just her way of surviving, I realized." Neither character gave her much surprise, but Love "definitely never anticipated feeling so much sympathy for *Mute."

In an informal Kotaku interview, Love revealed that she considered being drunk while writing a "necessity", due to the Joseon dynasty's reprehensible history and the nature of the research of social agendas against women. Despite her disgust at the philosophies behind Analogue's misogyny, Love expressed her interest in how "ideas take root...Nobody ever just wakes up one day and says[,] 'yeah, I hate women, I wish we'd stop letting them read.'"

On April 13, 2012, Dischan Media announced that it would distribute Analogue: A Hate Story, along with Juniper's Knot, through its online store.

An update for the game containing a Japanese localization was released on December 4, 2014. The game is also being localized by volunteers into Spanish and German.

Analogue's soundtrack was composed by Isaac Schankler. It contains eighteen tracks, with three of them included as bonus tracks.

On May 4, 2013, the Ren'Py-based source code for the game was released by Love. The Python portions are available without any restrictions or requirements. The script is included in the release for context, but remains under a proprietary license and cannot be used freely.

== Reception ==
Reception

Aggregate score
Aggregator	Score
Metacritic	62/100 from 5 critics

Review scores
Publication	Score
Destructoid	5/10
Eurogamer	7/10
IGN	7/10

Analogue was highly praised on both plot and interface, with the former being more noted than the latter. Eurogamer and JayIsGames praised the dark and emotional themes, pointing to how the mechanics interact with the thematic plot.

Several bloggers and gaming media sites noted the mechanics and interface of the game as well as the plot, such as 2chan.us and Killscreen, with 2chan labelling it as a "literary and intellectual delight." Matthew Sakey of Tap-Repeatedly remarked that "the thing about Christine Love is that she is a really, really good writer, one capable of astonishing deftness in her work."

PC Gamer UK gave Analogue 76 out of a 100, noting in particular to the skilfulness of the author's structural talent. Alec Meer of Rock, Paper, Shotgun said the brightness of the art was contradictory to the gloomy themes. As of August 26, 2013, Analogue holds a Metascore of 62 on Metacritic.

== Sequel ==
Christine Love announced a sequel to Analogue titled Hate Plus. Originally planned to be DLC before becoming full sequel release on 19 August 2013. According to an article by Kotaku's Patricia Hernandez, the sequel takes place after the events aboard the Mugunghwa and will feature the player returning to Earth and discovering how society on board the ship broke down. Those that finished the original game are able to import their save games into the sequel so that any decisions made will be part of the new story. Following Endings 1, 2, 4, and/or 5, Hate Plus reveals the events that took place aboard the Mugunghwa, prior to the shift into the Joseon-like society depicted in the original Analogue.
