= Ladykiller in a Bind =

2016 erotic visual novel

- Developer: Love Conquers All Games
- Designer: Christine Love
- Artist: Raide
- Writer: Christine Love
- Composer: Isaac Schankler
- Engine: Ren'Py
- Platforms: Windows; macOS; Linux
- Release: October 10, 2016
- Genre: Visual novel
- Mode: Single-player

My Twin Brother Made Me Crossdress as Him and Now I Have to Deal with a Geeky Stalker and a Domme Beauty Who Want Me in a Bind!!, or Ladykiller in a Bind, is a 2016 erotic visual novel by Love Conquers All Games, with writing and programming by Christine Love and art by Raide. It is described as "an erotic romantic comedy about social manipulation, crossdressing, and girls tying up other girls".

== Gameplay ==
The player takes the role of an 18-year-old woman, who is manipulated by her twin brother to impersonate him during a senior class cruise, where she is to win a popularity contest. As she interacts with fellow students during the seven days of the cruise, she may in turn manipulate and seduce them, often through BDSM scenes.

Some scenes feature nudity or sex. However, options to skip sex scenes and cover up nude protagonists with Christmas pullovers are available. In January 2017, Christine Love released a patch that changed a scene that had been the subject of much criticism by players and reviewers. In that scene, the player character had been made subject to nonconsensual sexual humiliation by a man.

== Release ==
Ladykiller in a Bind is available for Windows, Mac and Linux operating systems.

The game was initially only distributed through Humble Store and was unavailable on Steam due to that platform's policy against "too much" sexual content in games. A grassroots e-mail campaign by others in the video game industry sought to persuade Valve, the company operating Steam, to allow the game – pointing out that Genital Jousting, a game about fighting penises, was allowed on the platform. In January 2017, Ladykiller in a Bind became available on Steam after Love managed to contact a person at Valve and explain the game.

== Reception ==
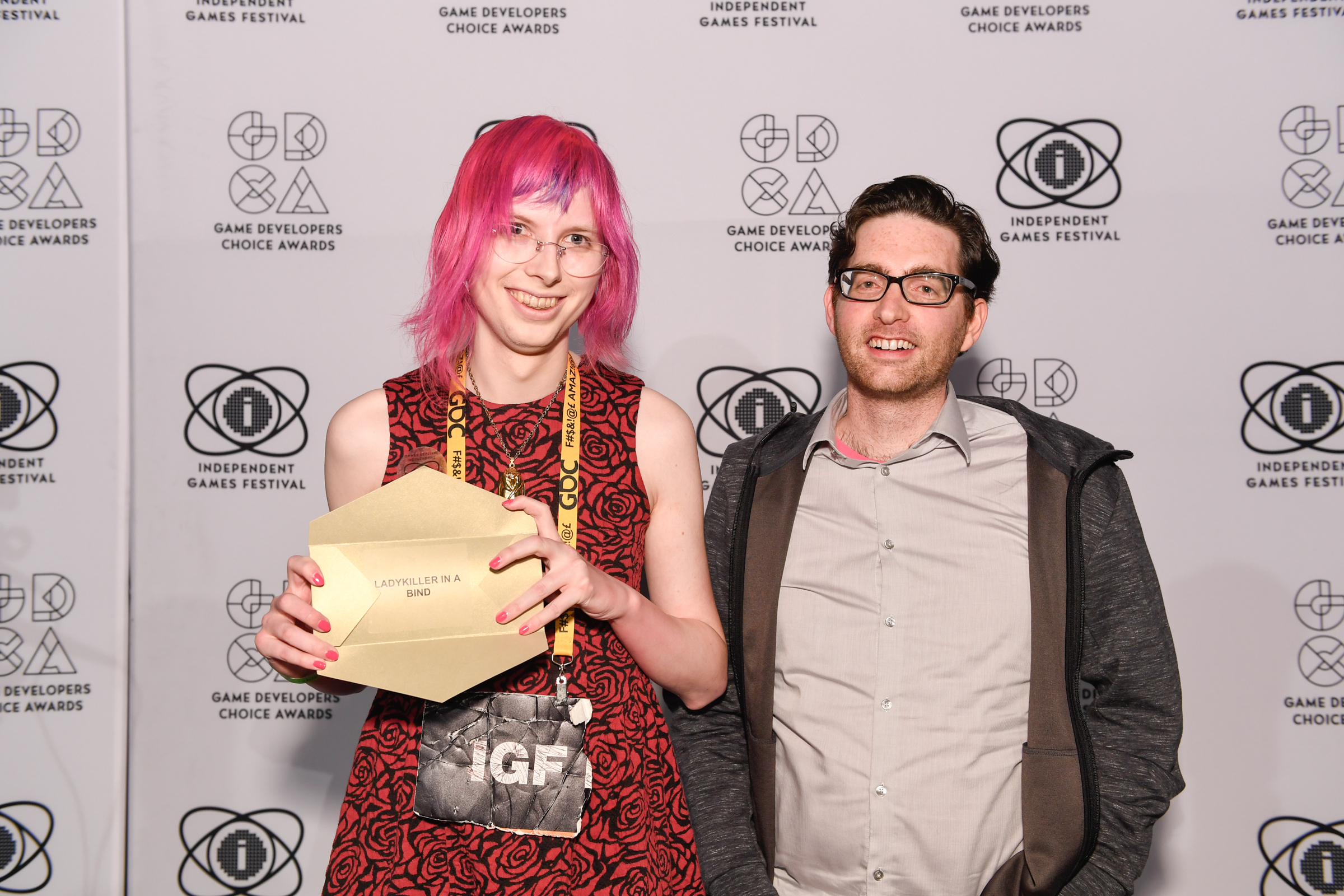
Christine Love and Isaac Schankler at the 2017 Independent Games Festival after winning the Excellence in Narrative Award

Ladykiller in a Bind received "mixed or average" reviews from game critics. On Metacritic, the game has an average of 73 out of 100 based on 7 reviews.

Reviewing the game in Polygon, Allegra Frank appreciated the well-drawn characters and the game's "elegant", "organic" portrayal of non-conventional sexuality, but criticized the "abrupt and disappointing" ending. Hardcore Gamer's Marcus Estrada noted the high-quality art, writing and soundtrack, as well as the game's "incredible cast of characters".

Writing for Kill Screen, Jess Joho highlighted Ladykiller in a Bind's "incredible accomplishment" of making consent – which is central to the game's erotic scenes – sexy by making "the most titillating parts show nothing more and nothing less than two people consenting, telling each other what they want with an unwavering honesty and understanding". She noted, however, that the focus on consent became at times too explicit.

In Rock, Paper, Shotgun, Kate Gray wrote that it was "incredibly refreshing to see a game that’s not aimed by default at guys and straight people", but she criticized the game's narrative for undermining the idea of consensuality by having the protagonist lie to her partners about her gender and identity, and as "irresponsible and damaging" for at times blurring the line between consensual BDSM acts, and forced or transactional sex. After one of the scenes at issue was changed by a patch, Simone de Rochefort and Merritt k at Polygon considered the discussion about it "disheartening" in that it indicated the demand for "an impossible level of precision when dealing with messy topics, especially from queer developers".

=== Awards ===
In 2017 the game won the Excellence in Narrative Award at the Independent Games Festival.
