= Seven Kingdoms (video game) =

1997 video game

- Developer: Enlight
- Publisher: Interactive Magic
- Designer: Trevor Chan
- Platforms: Windows, Linux
- Release: WW: November 30, 1997; Ancient Adversaries: EU: June 8, 1998; NA: 1998; WW: January 19, 2012 (Linux)
- Genre: Real-time strategy
- Modes: Single-player, multiplayer

Seven Kingdoms (Chinese: 七王國; pinyin: Qī Wáng Guó) is a real-time strategy (RTS) video game developed by Trevor Chan of Enlight Software. The game enables players to compete against up to six other kingdoms allowing players to conquer opponents by defeating them in war (with troops or machines), capturing their buildings with spies, or offering opponents money for their kingdom. The Seven Kingdoms series went on to include a sequel, Seven Kingdoms II: The Fryhtan Wars. In 2007, Enlight released a further title in the Seven Kingdoms series, Seven Kingdoms: Conquest.

== Gameplay ==
Seven Kingdoms made departures from the traditional real-time strategy model of "gather resources, build a base and army, and attack" set by other RTS games. The economic model bears more resemblance to a turn-based strategy game than to the traditional "build-workers, and harvest-resources" system in games such as Command & Conquer, StarCraft, and Age of Empires.

The game features an espionage system that allows players to train and control spies individually, who each have a spying skill that increases over time. The player is responsible for catching potential spies in their own kingdom. Inns built within the game allow players to hire mercenaries of various occupations, skill levels, and races. Skilled spies of enemy races are essential to a well-conducted espionage program, and players can bolster their forces by grabbing a skilled fighter or give one's own factories, mines, and towers of science a boost by hiring a highly skilled professional. For instance, having a skilled Persian general can make capturing and keeping a Persian village much easier.

The diplomacy system is akin to a turn-based game, allowing players to offer proposals to another party which they are able to either accept or reject. Each kingdom has a reputation and suffers a penalty for declaring war on a kingdom with a high reputation - making a player's people more likely to rebel and more susceptible to bribery. Diplomatic actions include making war, proposing an alliance or friendship treaty, buying food, exchanging technologies, offering tribute/aid, and forging trade agreements. A ranking system allows all players to gauge the relative military and economic strengths of their allies and enemies, making alliances against the stronger players a natural option.

The original game allows players to choose from seven different cultures to command: Japanese, Chinese, Mayans, Persians, Vikings, Greeks, and Normans. Each culture has its own weapons and fighting styles, and can summon its own "greater being", each with different powers.

Fryhtans are fictional beasts that hoard treasure and hold "scrolls of power", objects that enable players to summon greater beings. They are quite powerful and may attack human kingdoms.

Interactive Magic later released a free patch that added three new cultures - the Egyptians, the Mughals and the Zulus - and a new war machine, called the Unicorn. The game was re-released on June 8, 1998, under the name Seven Kingdoms: Ancient Adversaries with this patch included.

== Reception ==
=== Sales ===
Commercially, Seven Kingdoms was overshadowed at launch by competing real-time strategy titles such as Age of Empires, Total Annihilation and Dark Reign. Writing for CNET Gamecenter, Allen Rausch reported that the game was "buried" by the large number of releases in its genre at the time. The game was particularly dwarfed by Age of Empires, according to T. Liam McDonald of PC Gamer US, who placed part of the blame for Seven Kingdoms' sales on its "indifferent ad campaign and weak graphics." However, both Rausch and McDonald noted that Seven Kingdoms had attracted a dedicated fan following by 1999, at which point Rausch wrote that it had sold "fairly well". In the United States, the game sold roughly 35,000 units by November 1999, according to PC Data. Global sales of Seven Kingdoms, its expansion pack and its sequel surpassed 200,000 units by 2000.

=== Seven Kingdoms ===
Seven Kingdoms

Aggregate score
Aggregator	Score
GameRankings	85%

Review scores
Publication	Score
Computer Gaming World	4/5
GameRevolution	C
GameSpot	9/10
PC Gamer (US)	90%
PC PowerPlay	89%
PC Zone	68%

The game received "favorable" reviews according to the review aggregation website GameRankings (though almost all of them belong to its sequel rather than the original).

Seven Kingdoms was the finalist for GameSpot's 1997 "Best Strategy Game" award, which ultimately went to Total Annihilation. The editors wrote, "Even in light of fierce competition from this year's other top-notch strategy releases, Seven Kingdoms stands tall as an inventive, enjoyable product destined to be remembered." However, it won the publication's "Best Game No One Played" award.

In a 1999 retrospective, Computer Games Strategy Plus named Seven Kingdoms as a runner-up for its "10 Essential Real-time Strategy Games" list. The magazine's Steve Bauman wrote, "Its combat is nothing to write home about, but few RTS games have a better build-up phase, with a slick visual representation of trade and economy."

=== Ancient Adversaries ===
Seven Kingdoms: Ancient Adversaries

Aggregate score
Aggregator	Score
GameRankings	75%

Review scores
Publication	Score
AllGame	3.5/5
PC Zone	75%

The Ancient Adversaries expansion pack received "favorable" reviews according to GameRankings.

== See also ==
- List of strategy video games
