= Seaman (video game) =

1999 Sega Dreamcast video game

- Developers: Vivarium; Jellyvision
- Publishers: JP: Vivarium; NA: Sega; PlayStation 2: JP: ASCII Entertainment
- Designer: Yoot Saito
- Programmers: Arka Roy; Satoshi Endo; Yoshito Hirose; Shigekazu Ito; Kazuhiko Sugita; Takahisa Suzuki
- Composer: Tsueno Keaneda
- Platforms: Dreamcast; PlayStation 2
- Release: Dreamcast: JP: July 29, 1999; NA: August 8, 2000; JP: August 10, 2000 (2001 version); PlayStation 2: JP: November 15, 2001
- Genre: Simulation
- Mode: Single-player

Seaman (Note: Japanese: シーマン 〜禁断のペット〜, Hepburn: Shīman 〜Kindan no Petto〜; lit. Seaman: Forbidden Pets) is a 1999 virtual pet video game developed by Vivarium. It was originally released for the Dreamcast in Japan on July 29, 1999, and the following year in North America. During the duration of the game, the player must take care of fish-like creatures named "Seaman" and, through the use of a microphone accessory, converse with them.

The game was later ported to the PlayStation 2 under the title Seaman: Kindan no Pet - Gaze Hakushi no Jikken Shima (Note: Japanese: シーマン~禁断のペット~ガゼー博士の実験島; Seaman ~Forbidden Pets~ Dr. Gassé's Experimental Island) in 2001, only in Japan.

Seaman was well-received by critics, and would go on to become the third best-selling Dreamcast game in Japan, while overseas it garnered a cult following due to its dark humor, bizarre aesthetics, and innovative gameplay. A sequel, Seaman 2, was released in Japan for the PlayStation 2 in 2007.

A new game in the series for the Nintendo 3DS was also planned, but it was cancelled during development.

== Gameplay ==
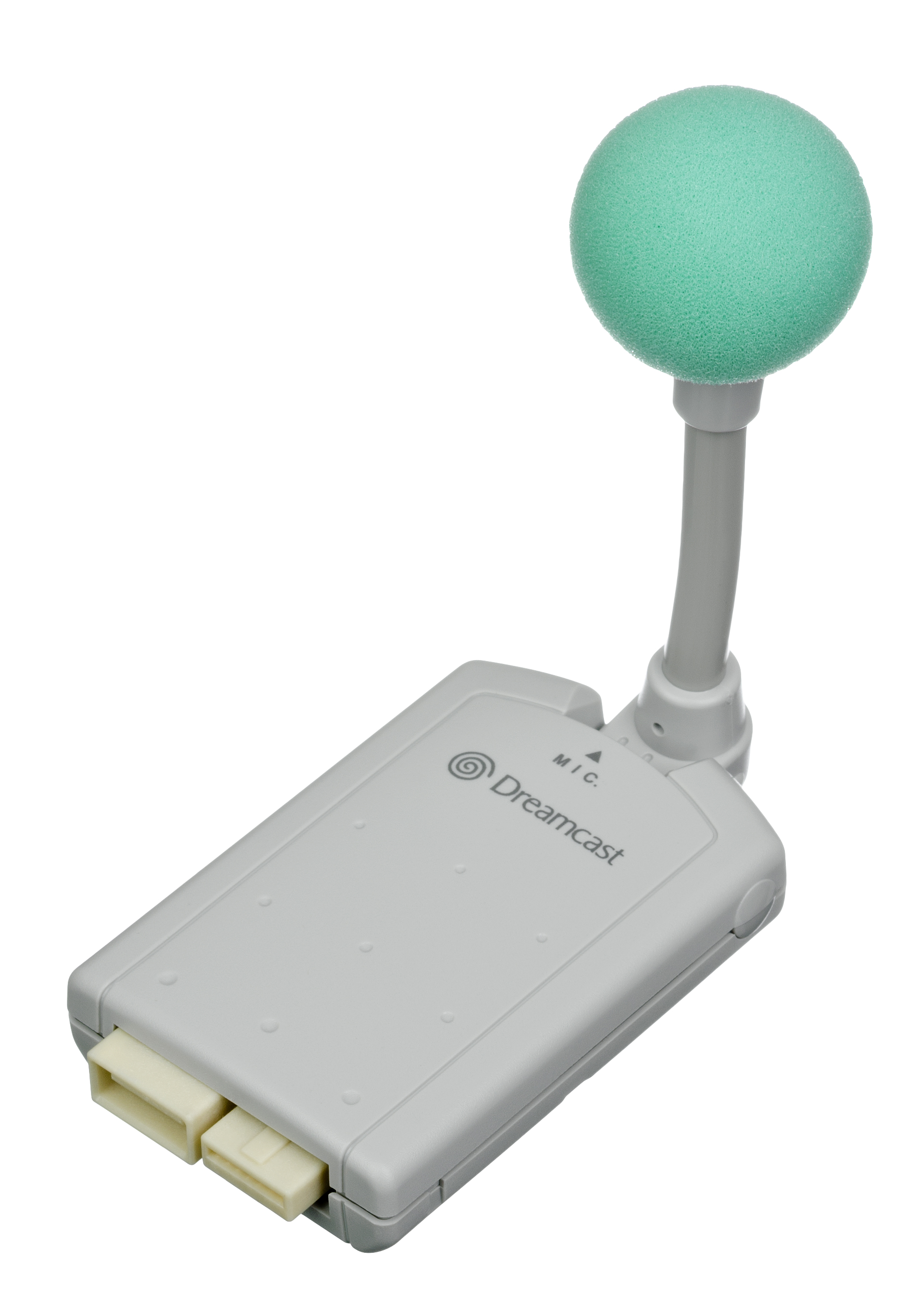
Seaman is played using voice commands and came bundled with the Dreamcast microphone.

Seaman is considered a unique video game because it contains limited action. The player's goal is to feed and care for the Seaman while providing him with the company that he needs. The mechanic operates in real time, so the player is required to check on the Seaman every real-time day or he could die. A portion of the Seaman's knowledge is random trivia. When he asks what the player's birthday is (and the player responds via the microphone input), the Seaman will share significant events that happened on that date.

Although the Seaman becomes fairly tame, it does not stop insulting the player or making less-than-friendly remarks.

At the beginning of the game, the player is provided with an unhatched Seaman egg and develops and interacts with it through various stages of development. Through various buttons on the Dreamcast controller, the player controls all the machinery and physical contact with the mysterious creature. The player is also provided with multiple Seamen for breeding and interaction purposes. Over the course of the game, the player is required to evolve their Seaman to different stages in its life cycle, eventually transforming into a frog-like creature outlined on the disc's cover.

The Seaman begins its first days of life as a Mushroomer, a form which consists of a well-developed optic organ and a flagellum. The Seaman lacks a face and any verbal means of communication. As a Mushroomer, the Seaman is essentially a parasite. After being eaten by a nautilus, it overruns its predator and consumes it from the inside out. Mushroomers tend to stick to one side of the tank by the ends of their flagellum if left alone. In this stage, the player's interaction is somewhat minimal and plays similar to a tutorial, allowing the player to learn to control the heat in the fish tank, direct the Mushroomers, and clean out any filthy water that has accumulated over time.

After emerging from the deceased body of the nautilus, the organism enters a stage called the Gillman, which resembles a cyprinid fish with a human face and a tentacle-like tube atop its forehead. During this stage, the Seaman becomes capable of speech but can only communicate in gibberish by reiterating comments made through microphone input. At this point, the player will begin the communication process and continue maintaining the aquarium as the Gillman grows larger, developing scales and a larger vocabulary. As the Gillmen mature, they develop scales and more advanced speaking abilities, but they will soon kill one another until only two remain. Their genders are indeterminate until they mature to the point of being able to be named. Once one is named, it will change its color and sex.

In its next stage, the Podfish, the Seaman is still fish-like in appearance and is similar to the Gillman but has gained frog-like legs. After mating, the male Podfish dies. The aquarium is also transformed into a terrarium: most of the water is gone, there is new land, and new breathable oxygen. The female then lays its eggs on the shore. Shortly after depositing the eggs, the female also dies, leaving the player a new generation of Seamen in a new evolutionary stage.

Instead of the introduction of hatching as Mushroomers like the first generation, the player began the game with a new form, the Tadman. They superficially resemble the baby Gillman but instead of a fish-like appearance, they resemble tadpoles. In addition, they still retain the same deep voice that their parents had. As they age, their bodies grow larger and small limbs begin to form. The Tadman eats their fellow siblings until their number is reduced to two. When this happens, the siblings will climb ashore and walk on land, ushering them into their next evolutionary stage.

The Frogman is the Seaman's final stage of its maturity process. It is an amphibious creature resembling a frog and like the Gillman, it has a human face and a tentacle-like tube atop its forehead. Now able to co-exist between the habitats of water and dry land, the Frogman is now capable of powerful leaps and the consumption of insectoid organisms; however, like the real-world frog, the creature still requires the moisture of water to stay alive. The player is provided with a sprinkler system to remedy this. It is also at this stage where the player releases the seaman into the wild. While anything concerning metamorphosis and reproduction is left to speculation while the Frogmen are in the wild, it can be assumed the Seaman will eventually lay Mushroomer eggs and start the cycle over.

== Story and setting ==
As a new pet owner, the player is given the responsibility of caring for and learning about the enigmatic "Seaman" species using a replica of the discoverer's laboratory. The player must figure everything out by themselves, such as appropriate care, with some guidance from the narrator, Leonard Nimoy.

The game's manual goes into further detail about the backstory of the seaman species. The manual on page 3 & 11 says to visit the website "www.meetseaman.com" for more information, between 2000 and 2004, it redirected to Yoot.com which expanded on the story in the manual.

During the 1930s, Dr. Jean-Paul Gassé was a member of a special team of French biologists sent to Egypt by the French government. During that time, Dr. Gassé was determined to research a creature that was an "omnipotent messenger of the gods" among the ruins of the Third Dynasty. In March 1932, in the city of Alexandria, Dr. Gassé met a local resident, who, while fishing, caught a Seaman. Dr. Gassé obtained a sample of some of the Seaman eggs, and went back to France with the egg samples in his possession.

When Dr. Gassé returned to France, he attempted to raise the eggs, but the Seamen died in his care. Shortly after this, he published a thesis of his work. His hypothesis suggested that the Seaman was responsible for transferring knowledge that increased during the Third Dynasty across oceans and other lands. Leading academics, however, dismissed him and his work as a PR stunt, leveraging the complaint against him that he lacked the proper evidence to support these outlandish findings. As a result, the work was ignored, and no one believed him. Despite its controversy, his theory became the basis for "anthro-bio-archaeology", a highly valued field of study.

Shortly after publishing his thesis, Dr. Gassé was fired from his post. After his dismissal, news of Gassé's whereabouts and activities were unknown, and details during those times were sketchy. Rumors began circulating that Dr. Gassé's trail traced to some remote islands in Southeast Asia. It is known, however, that he escaped the horrors of World War II and met up with his Japanese colleague, Kimo Masuda. It became clear that sometime during these years they were able to conduct further research on the Seaman's evolution, quite possibly even up to the creature walking on all fours. Unfortunately, there was very little hard data or evidence that substantiated these findings.

In March 1996, the French government established the Anthro-Bio-Archeological Research Institute (ABARI), headquartered in Paris. The institute is based on the work of Dr. Gassé, and most of the modern day research of the Seaman specimens has taken place there. In 1997, the ABARI announced there was a strong possibility that these Seaman species were closely related to the origins of ancient civilizations in Egypt. On October 6, 1998, one of Gassé's formaldehyde specimens is discovered at the University of Paris.

On February 15, 1999, parts of Gassé's journal and note entries were found in the Masuda family storehouse in the city of Matsusaka in Mie Prefecture, Japan. Professor Kendare Takahashi, who was directing the Japanese branch of the ABARI, successfully managed to breed Seaman eggs in captivity in July the same year. Soon after, Seamen were presented in aquariums across Japan. In July 2000, an expedition team embarked for Egypt in the first major research of Seamen in the wild.

== Development and release ==
Seaman is one of the few Dreamcast games to take advantage of the microphone attachment. The narration is voiced by Toshiyuki Hosokawa in the original Japanese-language version and by Leonard Nimoy in the English-language version. Seaman himself is voiced by Jeff Kramer in the English-language version. The face of the Seaman creature is modeled after the game's producer, Yoot Saito. In the Japanese version, Saito himself provides the voice of the Seaman, while the baby Seaman's voice is provided by his daughter, and the young Seaman's voice by the daughter of one of the programmers. During development, Sega had requested that a celebrity be used if possible, but Saito was hesitant, but later said that the fact that he played the role himself was "the key to success" because it gave him the advantage of being able to rerecord lines as many times as he wanted, so it was no longer a question of money.

Seaman was developed by Vivarium. It was conceived and designed by Saito, who originally came up with the concept of a joke when one of his coworkers was creating a tropical fish simulator. When Saito told his wife of the concept, she supported the idea despite considering it gross and strange. The prototype was initially developed on a Macintosh computer, with a year-and-a-half spent on converting it into a Dreamcast game. Near completion of the game, test players attempted to use long sentences to play the game. This caused the Seaman creature to say "Can you say that again?" repeatedly. To fix the issue, Yoot Saito changed the phrasing to say, "You talk too long, I don't understand" in order to inform players they need to use shorter and simpler sentences to interact with the Seaman creature.

The game's English localization was handled by Sega of America and took a total of nine months, where multiple changes to dialog were made regarding sex, politics, and slang based on cultural differences. In the Japanese version, the in-game Seaman creature would comment on the player's save data stored on their memory card, but this feature was removed in the English version due to privacy concerns. The creature's personality was different from the English version being more casual and negative.

In 1999, a limited edition digital greeting card titled Christmas Seaman was made available in Japan through December 16–26 via the Sega Direct online store or as part of a themed Dreamcast console bundle. The title came with two discs, one for sending messages and one for receiving messages, allowing players to connect to the online servers and exchange Christmas wishes and messages, while a Santa themed Seaman shares some of his trademark "Seaman wisdom".

In 2001, Seaman was re-released in Japan for the PlayStation 2 as Seaman: Kindan no Pet - Gaze Hakushi no Jikken Shima, the first edition of which came with a microphone. A version for Microsoft Windows was planned, with the Seaman being able to interact with the user's applications, but it was eventually cancelled. However, a limited version of the software, with the Seaman being able to interact with the user's e-mail, was released in 2003 under the title SeaMail.

== Reception ==
Reception

Aggregate scores
Aggregator	Score
GameRankings	81%
Metacritic	82/100

Review scores
Publication	Score
Electronic Gaming Monthly	8/10
Famitsu	9/10, 7/10, 7/10, 6/10 (DC); 31/40 (PS2)
GamePro	4.5/5
GameSpot	6.6/10
IGN	8.3/10
Next Generation	4/5
Planet Dreamcast	8.5/10
DC-UK	8/10

Award
Publication	Award
Edge	Gameplay Innovation

As of February 1, 2004, the Dreamcast version of Seaman sold 399,342 copies in Japan, making it the third best-selling Dreamcast game in the region at the time. The PlayStation 2 version of the game sold 305,632 in Japan as of November 2, 2008. It received an Excellence Award for Interactive Art at the 1999 Japan Media Arts Festival and received the Original Game Character of the Year award at GDC 2002. In 2008, Game Informer named the game one of the top ten weirdest games of all time.

Greg Orlando reviewed the Dreamcast version of the game for Next Generation, praising the game and stating, "the gentle art of conversation meets Resident Evil – and the Dreamcast gets its most bizarre title ever".

The Academy of Interactive Arts & Sciences nominated Seaman for the "Console Innovation" award during the 4th Annual Interactive Achievement Awards.

== See also ==
- Hey You, Pikachu!
- Lifeline
- N.U.D.E.@Natural Ultimate Digital Experiment
- Seaman 2
