= Polish role-playing games =

Polish role-playing games have been in production since the early 1990s. Now there are several games that have been designed in Poland, as well as many translations.

== History ==
Role-playing games were almost non-existent before the fall of communism in the People's Republic of Poland. There were no Polish publishers, no translators, and no distributors. In 1989, the publication of the "Talisman" board game began to increase interest in similar games, and the first unofficial fan translations of Western role-playing games began to appear.

The major change came in 1993 with the publication of Magia i Miecz (Magic and Sword), the first Polish magazine about role-playing games. Soon the Polish market began to fill up with both translations and Polish role-playing games, as well as new role-playing magazines (Złoty Smok, Talizman, Portal). Currently there are several games designed in Poland on the market, as well as many foreign translations.

== Polish games ==
Among the first Polish role-playing games was Kryształy Czasu (Crystals of Time), first published in parts of Magia i Miecz. This game is now mostly remembered for its cumbersome rules (based on percentile die) and original fantasy world (with orcs being the most civilized of the races). Another early debut was Andrzej Sapkowski's Oko Yrrhedesa, a beginner level RPG, based on Advanced Fighting Fantasy by Steve Jackson.

These early games opened the gate for other Polish domestic publications of role-playing games, such as Neuroshima (post-apocalyptic sci-fi set in United States), Monastyr (dark fantasy, exploring the issues of religion and race) and Dzikie Pola (a historical game, set in the 17th century Polish–Lithuanian Commonwealth, portrayed as Polish Golden Age). De Profundis, created by Michal Oracz, is a highly innovative micro-RPG derived from the literary horror forms of H. P. Lovecraft that encouraged players to explore horror themes by consciously blurring the lines between daily reality and dark Lovecraftian fantasies, either solo, in group chat, or by post. Another fantasy role-playing game is based on The Witcher fantasy world created by bestselling Polish fantasy author, Andrzej Sapkowski. Crystalicum, set in a mixed fantasy/sci-fi setting, somewhat resembling Spelljammer, debuted in late 2000s. Wolsung, a pulp Steampunk RPG has been released in English a couple of years after its Polish release. All of those games have unique mechanics, with Neuroshima and Monastyr using the custom 3d20 system, Dzikie Pola's system being the inspiration for American The Riddle of Steel, and De Profundis being essentially systemless.

Polish edition of Savage Worlds has resulted in some fan-made publication, and some Polish setting books, starting with Nemezis, a dark space opera.

In recent years the Crowdfunding and self-publishing phenomenon took place in Poland, with polish edition of Apocalypse World being entirely crowdfunded, and lesser-known indie games like Woje Miodomiła, Głębia przestrzeni, Idee fixe, or Iron Space being self-published by the authors.

== Translated games ==
One of the most popular translated role-playing games is Warhammer Fantasy, which gained a strong following on its first translation, early in 1994, when it became the first role-playing system officially translated into Polish. Another one is Advanced Dungeons & Dragons (second edition of the game). Other popular translated systems include Call of Cthulhu, many of White Wolf Publishing's World of Darkness games such as Werewolf: The Apocalypse, Vampire: the Masquerade and Mage: the Ascension, and other RPGs such as Cyberpunk 2020, Deadlands, Legend of the Five Rings, 7th Sea, Fading Suns, Earthdawn, Shadowrun, Savage Worlds and Castle Falkenstein. Since the early 2000s, Dungeons & Dragons has been available in Polish, and has gained a significant following of its own. The Fourth Edition was released, however due to changes of the licensing, no supplements have been published.

== Role-playing fandom ==
There is a substantial fandom of role-playing gamers in Poland. Among the largest role-playing and science fiction conventions in Poland are Polcon, Falkon and Pyrkon. Although Magia i Miecz is no longer in print, there are various fanzines and ezines, as well as many vibrant message boards and a Usenet group (pl.rec.gry.rpg).
