= Among Us =

2018 video game

- Cover art since June 15, 2021
- Developer: Innersloth
- Publisher: Innersloth
- Producer: Kristi Anderson
- Designer: Marcus Bromander (Note: Better known as "PuffballsUnited")
- Programmer: Forest Willard (Note: Better known as "ForteBass")
- Artists: Marcus Bromander; Amy Liu
- Composer: Marcus Bromander
- Engine: Unity
- Platforms: Android; iOS; Windows; Nintendo Switch; PlayStation 4; PlayStation 5; Xbox One; Xbox Series X/S
- Release: Android, iOS; June 15, 2018; Windows; November 16, 2018; Nintendo Switch; December 15, 2020; PS4, PS5, Xbox One, Xbox Series X/S; December 14, 2021
- Genres: Party; social deduction
- Mode: Multiplayer

Among Us is a 2018 online multiplayer social deduction game developed and published by the American game studio Innersloth. The game allows for cross-platform play; it was released on iOS and Android devices in June 2018 and on Windows later that year in November. It was ported to the Nintendo Switch in December 2020 and on the PlayStation 4, PlayStation 5, Xbox One and Xbox Series X/S in December 2021.

Among Us takes place in space-themed settings where players are colorful, armless cartoon astronauts. Each player takes on one of two roles: most are Crewmates, but a small number are Impostors. Crewmates work to complete assigned tasks in the game while identifying and voting out suspected Impostors (who appear identical to Crewmates) using social deduction, while Impostors have the objective of killing the Crewmates. The game was inspired by the party game Mafia and the science fiction horror film The Thing.

While the game was initially released in 2018 to little mainstream attention, it received a massive rise in popularity in 2020 due to many Twitch streamers and YouTubers playing it during the COVID-19 pandemic. It received favorable reviews from critics for fun and entertaining gameplay, and it has been considered among the greatest mobile games of all time. The game and its stylized characters have been the subject of various internet memes.

Following the game's success in 2020, the game has received multiple updates and spawned a multimedia franchise, with Among Us 3D launching in 2022, a TV series launching all-at-once in 2026, and a spinoff game, Among Us Story: On Guard, in development as of June 2026.

== Gameplay ==
In this gameplay screenshot of the original map, The Skeld, the white Impostor has killed the blue Crewmate. White's vision of the pink player has been partially obscured by the wall. Any player, including the killer, can report the dead body and trigger a meeting. (Note: In this image, the white Impostor's name is not highlighted in red because the screenshot is from the original Among Us trailer, which released before Impostors had highlighted names.)

Among Us is a multiplayer game for four to fifteen players. Up to three players, based on the number of players and the game host's choice, are randomly and secretly chosen to be the Impostors each round. As of 2026, five playable maps are available: a spaceship called "The Skeld", an office building called "MIRA HQ", a planet base called "Polus", "The Airship", a setting from Innersloth's Henry Stickmin series, and the Fungle, a mushroom jungle map. The Crewmates can win the game one of two ways: either by completing all assigned tasks or by ejecting all Impostors. Impostors can likewise win in two ways: either by killing or ejecting enough Crewmates, so that the number of Crewmates matches the number of Imposters, (Note: The game automatically declares a victory in favor of the Impostors if the number of Crewmates is reduced to be equal to the number of Impostors; as this would cause the Impostors to always hold a plurality vote during an emergency meeting, making it impossible for Crewmates to vote out the Impostors.) or by sabotaging a critical system on the map (provided the Crewmates do not resolve it in time). (Note: Games can also end by players quitting the match if doing so fulfills any win condition. If a Crewmate quits the game, their tasks are automatically considered completed.) At the start of the game, Crewmates are assigned "tasks" to complete around the map in the form of minigames, minipuzzles, and simple toggles, mostly consisting of maintenance work on vital systems such as fixing wires and downloading data. Impostors cannot complete tasks but may pretend to perform them to feign appearance as legitimate Crewmates. Impostors, however, can perform sabotages, ranging from minor (such as disabling lights, limiting the Crewmates' vision) to critical (such as disabling oxygen generators), requiring immediate counteraction by Crewmates to prevent their deaths. Impostors may enter and traverse ventilation ducts (commonly known as "venting"), and kill nearby Crewmates. To help Crewmates identify Impostors, there are various surveillance systems on each map, such as security cameras on The Skeld, a door log system with sensors in MIRA HQ, and a vitals indicator in Polus that shows the living status of all players. In addition, certain "visual tasks" provide animated cues, such as scanning oneself in the Skeld's medbay. As Impostors cannot perform tasks, Crewmates can use visual tasks to confirm their identity to nearby Crewmates.

Any living player can initiate a group meeting either by reporting a dead body or by pressing the Emergency Meeting button. (Note: During critical sabotages, emergency meetings cannot be called by button, but dead bodies can still be reported.) During meetings, players discuss—via the in-game text chat or an external voice chat application such as Discord—who they believe to be Impostors based on available witness testimonies, with Impostors lying to hide their identity or falsely accusing other players. Impostors can be identified beyond reasonable doubt if they are seen killing a Crewmate unless there are Shapeshifters, or seen venting unless there are Engineers or Shapeshifters, but ultimately players must weigh the veracity or value of each other's statements. Players then vote for who they believe is an Impostor; if a plurality vote is obtained, (Note: While the individual votes are held by plurality, the overall structure of the game follows Coombs' method, a multi-round rule where the candidate with the most last-place votes is eliminated in each round.) the player who received the most votes is "ejected" from the game. Players who are killed or ejected become ghosts, which can still perform tasks (Crewmates) or sabotages (Impostors) but are otherwise unable to be seen by or interact with living players. Effectively, spectators and ghosts may see and pass through walls, follow players or other ghosts, and chat with other ghosts.

A November 2021 update added additional specialized roles to the game: Crewmates can also be Engineers, Scientists, as well as regular Crewmates. The first Crewmate that dies can also become a Guardian Angel, the role of which is not given at the beginning of a round. Engineers can traverse vents like Impostors, albeit to a limited capacity. On the other hand, Impostors can stay in the vent as long as they want. Scientists can check vitals from anywhere on the map to see if any player has been killed this round. The ghost of the first Crewmate that dies can become the Guardian Angel, which can temporarily protect living players from being killed. Impostors likewise can be Shapeshifters, allowing them to temporarily morph into other players and assume their color and appearance. However, they might leave evidence behind depending on the game settings. An additional update in June 2024 added three more roles, including Noisemakers and Trackers to the roles of Crewmates, and Phantoms to those of Impostors. Noisemakers trigger an alert when they are killed that can visually indicate their death's location to other Crewmates. Trackers can track the location of another player for a limited amount of time. Phantoms are able to briefly turn invisible to avoid detection. In September 2025, two more roles were added: the Detective for Crewmates and the Viper for Impostors. Detectives are able to open case files for every murder and use their interrogation ability to find out where players were when a player was killed. Vipers are able to dissolve bodies over time, leaving no evidence. In August 2026, a new role was added: the Judge for crewmates. Judges are able to overrule votes in meetings and decide who gets ejected.

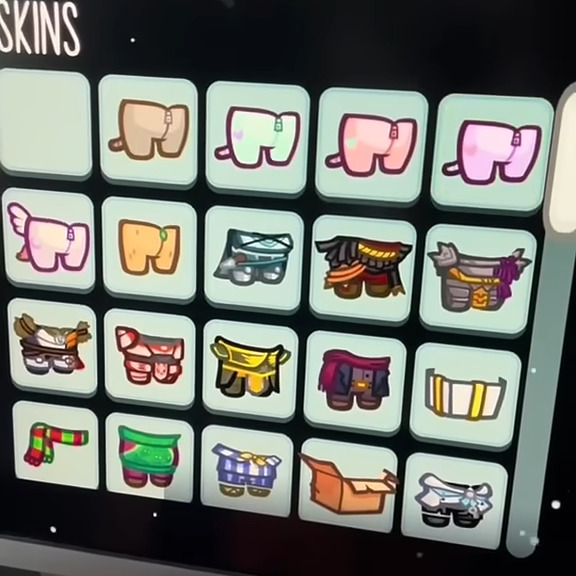
Skins selection in Among Us

An alternative "Hide and Seek" game mode was added in December 2022. There are no meetings or ejections, and a single Impostor, known as the seeker (whose identity is known to the Crewmates), attempts to kill all Crewmates within a fixed countdown timer. Crewmates must hide or flee from the Impostor and can complete tasks to roll down the timer, as well as enter vents for a brief time to hide from the Impostor. Impostors cannot perform sabotages or enter vents in this mode. Crewmates are also given a display showing their proximity to the Impostor as well as the number of remaining Crewmates. Near the end of the round, the Impostor obtains a "seek" button allowing them to see where Crewmates are.

Before each game, various options can be adjusted to customize aspects of gameplay, such as player movement speed, the allowed number of emergency meetings, number of tasks and visual tasks, or whether or not an Impostor is revealed after being voted off, allowing participants to manually balance the game's settings to their desires. Players may modify their own appearances with cosmetics, including skins, hats, visors, and pets, some of which are purchasable as microtransactions.

== Development and release ==
=== Early development ===
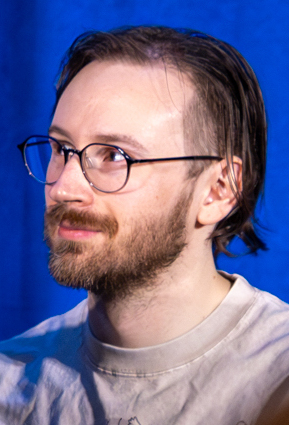
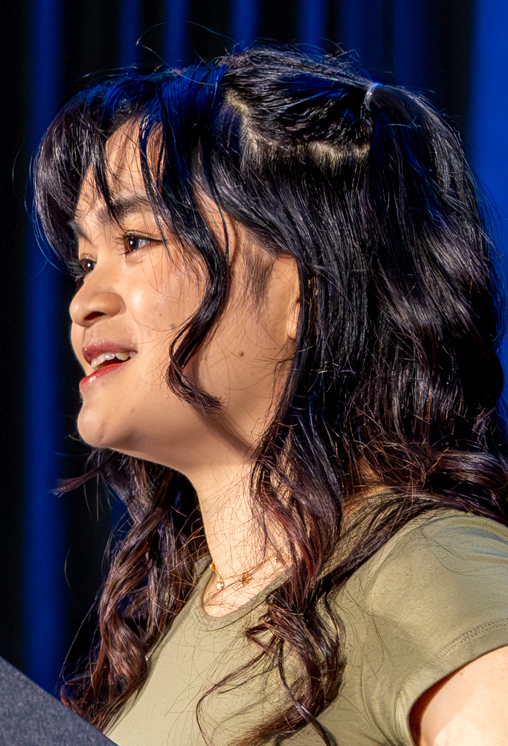
Innersloth CEO and co-founder Forest Willard (left) and community director Victoria Tran (right)

Among Us was inspired by the live party game Mafia, and the science fiction horror film The Thing. The idea for the concept was originally given by Marcus Bromander, co-founder of Innersloth, who had played Mafia since he was a kid. In the original game, function cards were dealt and players wandered around a house, aimlessly, while another person secretly killed the players, drawing a finger around their neck. Most of its mechanics were still present in Among Us, but the team wanted to "alleviate the need to create an interesting home model and have someone wandering around in a boring environment". So, they decided that the game would be space-themed and also added tasks, which, according to Forest Willard, programmer at Innersloth, "changed several times during development".

Development began in November 2017. The game was initially intended to be a mobile-only local multiplayer game with a single map. Bromander paused development on Innersloth's other game, The Henry Stickmin Collection, in order to build Among Us's first map, The Skeld. When they began developing the first map, they intended that the ship was always in crisis and that the Impostors could do tasks. However, they found this setup "stressful" and decided that it "[would not leave] much time for detective work and informed meeting conversations". Willard described playtesting as painful and frustrating, as the game would break down during sessions forcing him to send playtesters new builds off of Google Play. The team tested the game with 8 of their friends and never tested the game with 9 or the maximum of 10 players. The game was developed using the Unity engine.

The game was released in June 2018 to Android and iOS under the AppID "spacemafia". Shortly after release, Among Us had an average player count of 30 to 50 concurrent players. Bromander blamed the game's poor release on Innersloth being "really bad at marketing". The team nearly abandoned the project multiple times but continued work on it due to a "small but vocal player base", adding in online multiplayer, new tasks, and customization options. The game was released on Steam on November 16, 2018. Cross-platform play was supported upon release of the Steam version. Originally, the game had no audio to avoid revealing hidden information in a local setting, (Note: For example, the sound of an Impostor killing a Crewmate could reveal to other Crewmates who the Impostor was.) and Willard mixed sounds from numerous sound packs to compose the SFX during the game's Steam release.

On August 8, 2019, Innersloth released a second map, MIRA HQ, a "tightly packed headquarters roughly the size of The Skeld". A third map, Polus, was added on November 12, 2019, and is set in a research station. The fourth map, the Airship, was released on March 31, 2021, and is based on a location in the Henry Stickmin universe. MIRA HQ and Polus originally cost players US$4 via in-app purchase. Their prices were reduced to US$2 on January 6, 2020, then made free on June 11, 2020. While the map packs are still available for purchase on all platforms, they now only provide the player the skins that were bundled with the maps. According to Willard, the team "stuck with [the game] a lot longer than we probably should have from a pure business standpoint", putting out regular updates to the game as often as once per week. This led to a steady increase in players, causing the game's player base to snowball. Bromander attributed this to the studio having enough savings to keep working on the game even while it was not selling particularly well.

=== Canceled sequel and ongoing updates ===
Release timeline
| 2018 | iOS/Android |
| 2018 | Windows |
| 2019 | "MIRA HQ" |
| 2019 | "Polus" |
| 2020 | Nintendo Switch |
| 2021 | "The Airship" |
| 2021 | PlayStation 4, PlayStation 5, Xbox One, and Xbox Series X/S |
| 2021 | New roles: "Engineer", "Scientist", "Guardian Angel", and "Shapeshifter" |
| 2022 | Among Us VR |
| 2022 | Hide-and-seek mode |
| 2023 | "The Fungle" |
| 2024 | New roles: "Tracker", "Noisemaker", and "Phantom" |
| 2025 | New roles: "Detective" and "Viper" |
| 2026 | New roles: "Judge" and "Influencer" |

In August 2020, the team shifted focus onto a sequel, Among Us 2. (Note: When discussing its planned sequel, the game was given the retronym of "Among Us 1" by the game's developers as well as several news outlets.) During this time, Willard and Amy Liu continued to update Among Us, increasing the maximum player base, adding four servers and three regions, and implementing longer multiplayer codes to support more concurrent games. On September 23, 2020, the team announced that they abandoned development of the sequel in favor of reworking the original game's codebase, which they described as "outdated and not built to support adding so much new content", so the team made plans to rework the game's core code to enable adding new features. The team subsequently announced their plans to fix the game's server issues and widespread cheating problem, as well as add a system for banning disruptive players. In October 2020, colorblind support for the "wires" task was added to the Among Us beta on Steam, as well as some previously unannounced lobby customization options.

In mid-February 2021, the game introduced a feature called Quickchat, replacing the traditional chat interface with a set of preset phrases that players can choose from. Players under the age of 13 are required to use Quickchat, but those over 13 are also allowed to use Free Chat, which allows them to type text messages. First announced at The Game Awards 2020, the Airship map was released on March 31, 2021. The Airship features multiple floors, contraptions, tasks, and "more". In addition, Game Awards presenter Geoff Keighley's face was added as a skin. The map itself is based upon the Henry Stickmin series's Toppat Clan Airship. Innersloth also stated that the map would be free to all players. It also features a skin bundle that includes Henry Stickmin-themed cosmetic that can be bought on Steam.

The accounts system was implemented along with the update, and it allows players to report players that are not following Innersloth's Code of Conduct in order to make the game a welcoming and respectful place. Punishment includes temporary to permanent bans. They also stated that reports would be viewed manually and not by bots, that account creations would be required if players want to use Free Chat or to customize their nicknames, and that people under the age of 13 would need their parents' permission to create an account. Implementing an account system also allowed Innersloth to add account linking and a friending system in future updates. Innersloth later revealed on the game's official Twitter account a new color to the game, Rose, which was included in the game's next update along with five other colors: Coral, Tan, Gray, Maroon, and Banana, which were revealed during Summer Game Fest on June 10, 2021, alongside other upcoming content, including a fifth map, new Hide & Seek game mode, and new roles. The new colors, along with 15 player lobby support, new meeting screen and revamp at the game's design, was released on June 15, 2021, during the game's third anniversary.

On July 7, 2021, Innersloth released a minor update that adds a new task, "Clean Vent", which involves the Crewmate cleaning a specific vent, preventing Impostors (and as of the November 9 update, Engineers) from using it, as well as some icon changes. On November 9, 2021, a major update was released that introduced four new roles (Shapeshifter, Engineer, Scientist, and Guardian Angel), achievements, a level system, controller support, custom keybinds, visor cosmetics, cosmetic bundles called "Cosmicubes", various in-game currencies, and a major revamp to the in-game store, which also reveals the names of the costumes. On March 31, 2022, a friending system was added, which allows players to see who they recently played with, send and receive friend requests, send and receive lobby invites, as well as the ability to block people. On June 21, 2022, the game was patched to include colorblind text. At The Game Awards 2022 on December 8, 2022, it was announced that the Hide & Seek mode would be released the following day.

During a Nintendo Direct on September 14, 2023, the fifth map, "The Fungle", was announced. It was released on October 24, 2023.

On March 25, 2025, Innersloth released an update that improved matchmaking, alongside a collaboration with Sega's Like a Dragon series, returning a favor where a Crewmate was featured in Super Monkey Ball Banana Rumble, also developed by Ryu Ga Gotoku Studio. On September 10, the Detective and Viper roles were introduced. In August 2026, the Judge role was introduced. On September 29, Influencer, the ghost crewmate role was introduced.

=== Console releases ===
Amid its popularity, Innersloth considered releasing the game to PlayStation 4 and Xbox One consoles, but encountered a problem in implementing player communication, since standard text-based or voice-based chat seemed unusable. They considered a system similar to the "quick comms" system from Rocket League, as well as the possibility of developing an entirely new communication system for the game. Versions of the game for Xbox consoles were later announced.

Among Us was released for the Nintendo Switch on December 15, 2020, the same day it was announced during an Indie World showcase. The Switch version supports cross-platform play with the mobile and Windows versions. This port was co-developed by PlayEveryWare. Upon release, the Switch version had an exploit to access The Airship prior to its official release in early 2021. The exploit was fixed two days after release in the Switch version's first update.

Among Us was released digitally for PlayStation 4, PlayStation 5, Xbox One, and Xbox Series X/S consoles on December 14, 2021, along with its release on the Xbox Game Pass for console. These versions support cross-platform play with existing Windows, Switch, and mobile versions. Unique to the PlayStation ports are special customization options based on Ratchet and Clank from Insomniac Games's eponymous series under license from Sony Interactive Entertainment. Unique to the Xbox ports is a skin based on Master Chief from the Halo series under license from Microsoft. Physical releases for consoles were available in Europe the same day, while North American physical releases were released in January 2022.

== Reception ==
Reception

Aggregate score
| Aggregator | Score |
|---|---|
| Metacritic | PC: 85/100; Switch: 79/100 |

Review scores
| Publication | Score |
|---|---|
| 4Players | 68/100 |
| Game Informer | 8/10 |
| IGN | 9/10 |
| Jeuxvideo.com | 14/20 |
| Nintendo Life | 8/10 |
| PCMag | 4/5 (iOS) |
| Push Square | 7/10 |
| TheGamer | 4/5 |

Among Us was well received by critics. On the aggregator website Metacritic, the PC port received a 85 of 100 score based on 9 critic reviews, while the Nintendo Switch version received a 79 of 100 score based on 9 critic reviews, both them indicating "generally favorable reviews". It was also considered one of the "Best PC Games for 2018", being ranked 17th, and as the "#38 Best Discussed PC Game of 2018". Since December 2020, IGN considered it one of 2020's best reviewed games so far.

Elliott Osange of Bonus Stage considered that the game is "silly fun", but felt that it is more fun "to be an Impostor". Craig Pearson of Rock, Paper, Shotgun had the same opinion, found playing as an Impostor "a lot more fun" than playing as a Crewmate, which he called "exhausting". In reference to the game's popularity among streamers, Evelyn Lau of The National said: "Watching the reactions of people trying to guess who the imposter is (and sometimes getting it very wrong) or lying terribly about not being the imposter is all quite entertaining." Alice O'Conner of Rock, Paper, Shotgun described the game as "Mafia or Werewolf but with minigames". Andrew Penney of TheGamer said the game was "worth it for the price" and that "who you play with dictates how fun the game is." L'avis de Tiraxa of Jeuxvideo.com praised the game's Freeplay mode, which offers newer players "to browse the map alone to accommodate the places", as they would need to play several games in order to "perfect their strategies".

Leana Hafer from IGN stated in her verdict on the game: "I don't have any sus that this will be the last game of its breed to make a splash, since we're already seeing its influence on even mega-games like Fortnite". As a negative point, she pointed out some technical problems, such as the difficulty of finding rooms that aren't already full or are a long way from getting there. She also lamented the lack of "mechanic to punish players who rage-quit when they don't get to play as impostor, or are caught dead to rights in the middle of a murder". Tiraxa of Jeuxvideo.com was more critical of the game, lamenting the lack of an inbuilt voice chat, server bugs which "[prevent] some from joining the party, in a totally unexplained way", public servers with strangers, which she considered "less entertaining" than private servers with friends, and the large development progress, stating that the game has a "bit of a way to go before it reaches its full potential". The mobile version of the game, although being free-to-play, was criticized. Osange of Bonus Stage called the presence of ads and in-app purchases of cosmetic changes that are mostly available for free on the PC version "nonsense". He also called the PC version "stable" but also stated that the Android version is "a device-by-device situation".

The Nintendo Switch version received some criticism. William Antonelli of Insider said that the Switch controls give "many tasks a satisfying game response". However, he also stated that most of the tasks could be "done quickly with the Switch's touchscreen control", which can only be used when the console is in handheld mode. He noted that many of the game's tasks are difficult to complete using a gamepad, which is required when the console is connected to a larger screen, and considered this version "inferior" to the PC and mobile versions. He also stated that the communication system is "frustrating", as using the joystick to select letters is "slow", and said the fact that the game has support for multiplayer across multiple platforms gives Switch players "immediate disadvantage". PJ O'Reilly of Nintendo Life noted that the Switch lacked much of the additional content available on other platforms, such as skins, which he called a "shame".

Among Us has been frequently compared to Fall Guys, as both became popular as party games during the COVID-19 pandemic; the developers of both games have positively acknowledged each other on Twitter. Comparisons have also been drawn between the two games' avatars, which have been said to look like jelly beans. Among Us has also been compared to The Thing, Town of Salem, Werewolves Within, and Secret Hitler.

=== Sales ===
As of September 2020, Steam Spy estimated that the game had more than 10 million owners on Steam. The Associated Press noted the game was the most downloaded app on the iOS App Store for both iPhones and iPads in October 2020. According to SuperData Research, the game had roughly 500 million players worldwide as of November 2020, with the free-to-play mobile version accounting for 97% of players and the buy-to-play PC version accounting for 3% of players, though it was the buy-to-play PC version that generated 64% of the game's gross revenue. Among Us became one of the best selling games of 2020 on Steam, being listed on the platinum category on "The Year's Top 100" list. The Nintendo Switch version's launch sold 3.2 million digital units in December 2020, making it the highest-earning version of the game for the month and one of the best-selling games on the Nintendo Switch.

Among Us was offered as a free game on the Epic Games Store during one week in May 2021. Its average daily player count jumped from around 350,000 players in the weeks before to over 2 million players during the giveaway. On June 29, 2021, Innersloth reported on Twitter that during the game's free promotion on Epic Games Store, at least 15 million copies were claimed.

Sales from Among Us allowed Innersloth to create a publishing label, Outersloth, to help support other indie developers, using a recoup-and-revenue-share model whereby Outersloth invests in a game and recoups those funds from sales. Innersloth had wanted to be able to support other developers, and after seeing the game Mars First Logistics, set the formation of Outersloth in motion. Outersloth was revealed in 2024 as part of the Summer Game Fest.

=== Awards ===
| Award | Date of ceremony | Category | Result | Ref. |
|---|---|---|---|---|
| Golden Joystick Awards 2020 | November 24, 2020 | Breakthrough Award | Won | |
| The Game Awards 2020 | December 10, 2020 | Best Mobile Game | Won | |
| The Game Awards 2020 | December 10, 2020 | Best Multiplayer Game | Won | |
| Steam Awards 2020 | January 3, 2021 | Labor of Love Award | Nominated | |
| Nickelodeon Kids' Choice Awards | March 13, 2021 | Favorite Video Game | Won | |
| Webby Awards | May 18, 2021 | Breakout of the Year | Won | |
| Mobile Games Awards | July 20, 2021 | Best Indie Developer | Won | |
| International Game Developers Association | August 27, 2021 | Community Management | Won | |
| App Store Awards | December 2, 2021 | Connections | Won | |
| British Academy Games Awards | April 7, 2022 | Evolving Game | Nominated | |

== In popular culture ==
=== 2020 spike ===
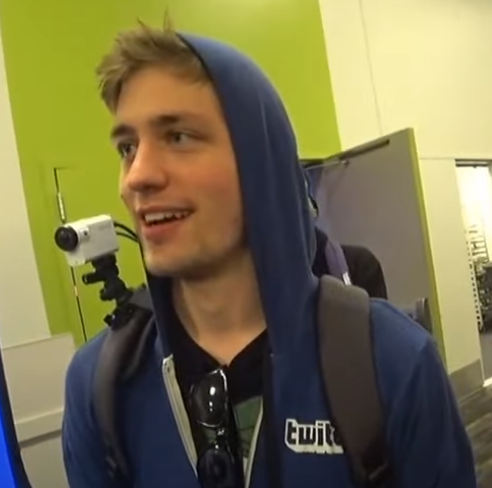
Sodapoppin, a streamer, is credited with popularizing Among Us on the live-streaming platform Twitch.

While Among Us was released in 2018, it was not until mid-2020 that it saw a surge of popularity, initially driven by content creators online in South Korea and Brazil. Bromander stated that the game is more popular in Mexico, Brazil, and South Korea than in the United States. According to Willard, Twitch streamer Sodapoppin first popularized the game on Twitch in July 2020. Many other Twitch streamers and YouTubers followed suit, including prominent content creators xQc, Pokimane, Shroud, Ninja, MrBeast, Disguised Toast and PewDiePie.

The COVID-19 pandemic was frequently cited as a reason for the popularity of Among Us, as it allowed for socializing despite social distancing.

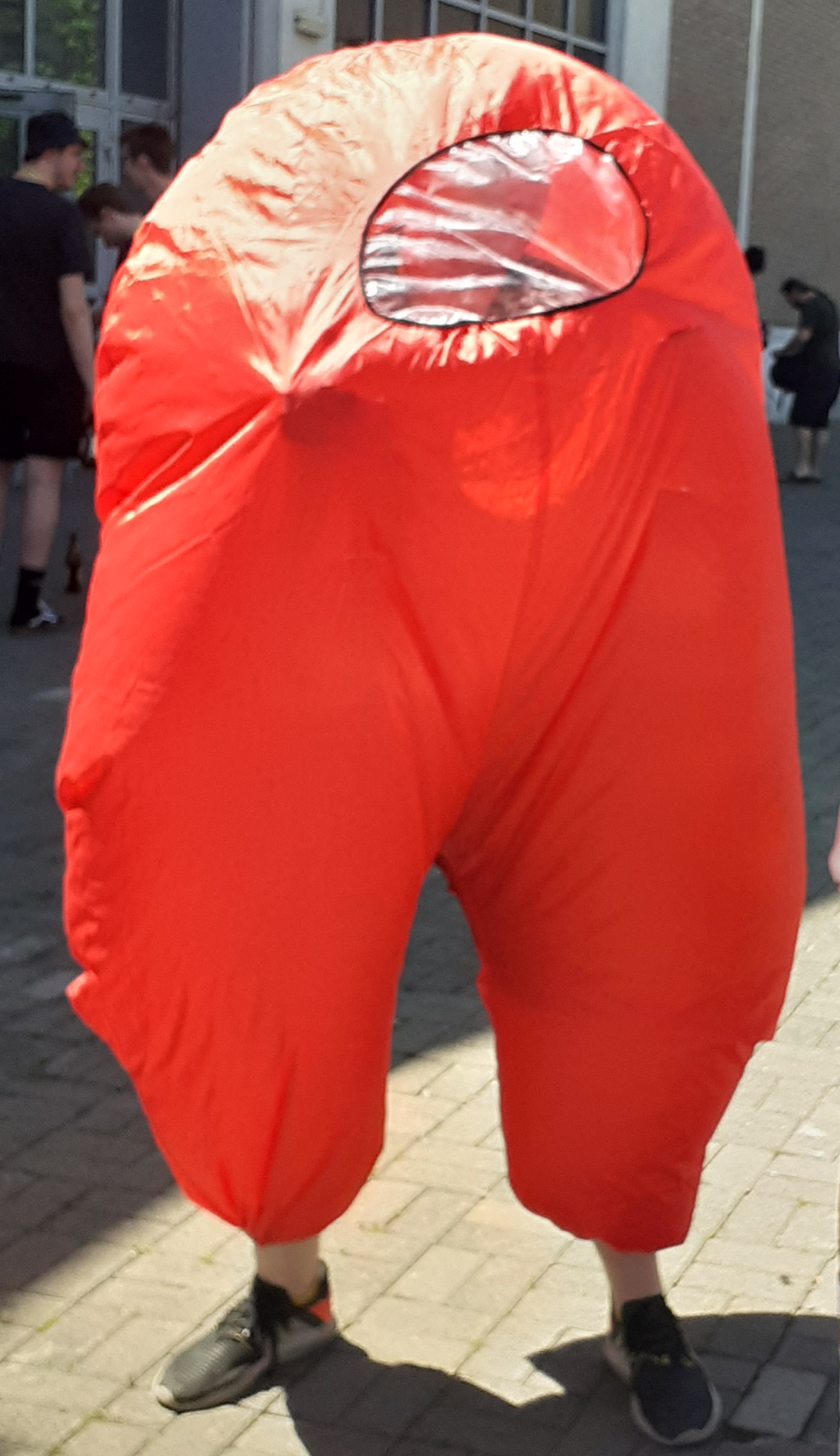
Cosplay of an Among Us crewmate

Emma Kent of Eurogamer believed that the release of Innersloth's The Henry Stickmin Collection also contributed to awareness of Among Us, and PC Gamer's Wes Fenlon credited Twitch streamer SR_Kaif for "prim[ing] Among Us for its big moment." Fenlon also praised Among Us for improvements over other popular tabletop games that had been inspired by Mafia, such as Secret Hitler. He said other video game adaptations of Mafia such as Town of Salem and Werewolves Within were "just add[ing] an online interface for the basic Werewolf rules," whereas Among Us is as an entirely new take on the concept. Along with Fall Guys and the Jackbox Party Packs, Among Us provided a narrative-less experience that helped to avoid the "cultural trauma" of the pandemic, according to M.J. Lewis of Wired.

The game's popularity continued into the following months. YouTube reported that videos about Among Us were viewed 4 billion times in September 2020, and TikTok videos related to Among Us had over 13 billion views in October 2020. YouTuber CG5 wrote a song based on the game in September 2020, titled "Show Yourself", and gained over 60 million views in four months. (Note: The song's popularity led to 2 sequels, Lyin' To Me and Good To Be Alive, released in November 2020 and February 2021, respectively.) In September 2020, the game exceeded 100 million downloads and its player count rose to 1.5 million concurrent players (nearly 400 thousand of which were on Steam), then peaked at 3.8 million in late September. The sudden increase in players overloaded the game's server, which according to Willard was "a totally free Amazon server, and it was terrible." This forced him to work quickly, under crunch time, to resolve these issues.

=== Memes and mods ===
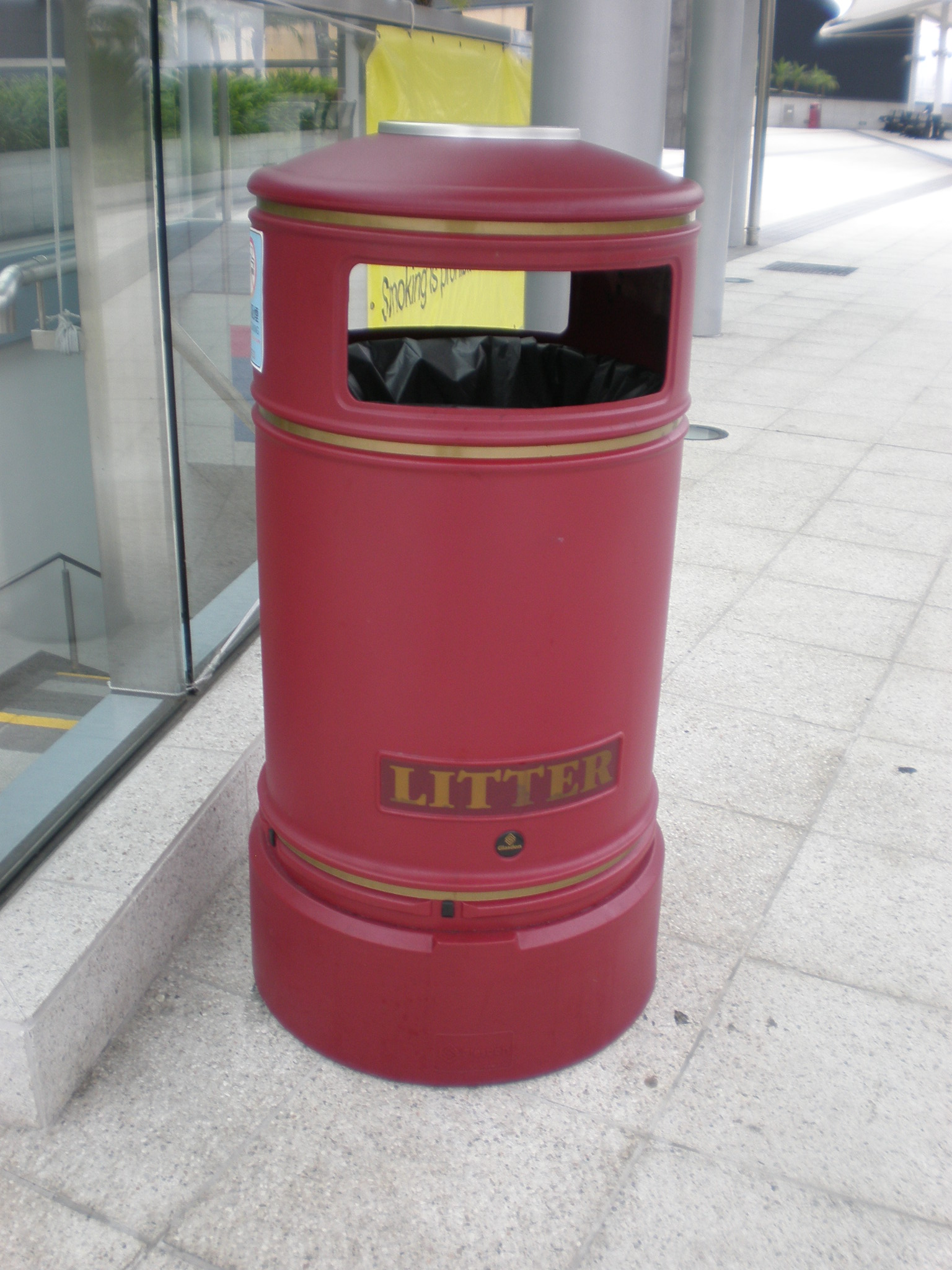
Many internet memes about Among Us reference Crewmate's superficial resemblance to unrelated daily objects, such as this trash can, or a fingernail.

In August 2020, Innersloth opened an online store for Among Us themed merchandise. The game's popularity inspired many original songs, fan art and internet memes, Willard expressed that fan-created content "really is the best part" of making Among Us, and Bromander called it "my favorite thing to see". The game popularized the slang word sus (meaning "suspicious" or "suspect"), which had been used before the game's release. Other slang terms as well as internet memes popularized and inspired by Among Us include sussy and sussy baka (derived from sus), when the imposter is sus (a meme based on Among Us, usually alongside an edited photo of streamer Jerma985), and amogus (a satiric misspelling of "Among Us"). (Note: The "amogus" strain of internet memes draws its origin from the initial amogus meme of a StoneToss cartoon combined with an Among Us character.) In addition, the meme "Among Us everywhere" is a phenomenon where unexpected objects resemble the Crewmate character. In September 2022, sus was added to Merriam-Webster's dictionary.

During its time of widespread popularity, Among Us was controversially played by the U.S. Navy Esports team, in which players on the stream used in-game names obliquely referencing the slur nigger ("Gamer Word") and the bombing of Nagasaki ("Japan 1945" and "Nagasaki"). The stream was deemed "offensive" and "intolerable" by some viewers. The sailor responsible for the stream was later kicked off the team. In October 2020, U.S. Representatives Alexandria Ocasio-Cortez and Ilhan Omar streamed the game alongside several other prominent streamers such as Pokimane and Hasan Piker as a way to encourage people to vote in the 2020 United States presidential election, drawing almost 700,000 concurrent viewers on Twitch.

The game received several mods made by the community, which added roles, game modes, cosmetics, etc. Among Us was featured in Twitch Rivals 2020, an online gaming tournament which was held on December 4, 2020. During the event, players were able to receive an exclusive pet called "Glitch Pet", which is the Twitch logo.

==== Chicken nugget auction ====
In May 2021, an eBay user named Tav listed a Chicken McNugget from the 2021 BTS Meal by McDonald's for online auction. The nugget was listed because the seller felt it resembled a Crewmate, and was inspired by a 2017 auction for a Cheeto that looked similar to the gorilla Harambe, which sold for US$99,900. Despite Tav only expecting the nugget to sell for around US$50, a bidding war began two days later, and the nugget was sold to an anonymous buyer for US$99,997. Tav decided to include Szechuan sauce after a comment on social media from Xbox. Several news outlets covered the auction, who largely cited it as an example of an absurd price caused by internet memes, and following the sale, multiple other listings selling nuggets of a similar shape were made in hopes of profiting from the popularity of the original listing. Several TikTokers and QAnon-adjacent conspiracy theorists promoted misinformation and rumors claiming that the high price of the listing was a front for child sex trafficking. In 2022, the listing was recognized by Guinness World Records as the "most expensive chicken nugget sold at online auction". That October, Chilean chicken brand Super Pollo partnered with Innersloth to launch a Crewmate-shaped chicken nugget into the Earth's thermosphere.

=== October 2020 and January 2021 hacks ===
In mid-October 2020, a hacker known as "Eris Loris" began targeting mainly North American servers. Several players on the Among Us subreddit and Twitter reported this player hacking their lobbies and spamming in-game chat with promotions for his YouTube channel, links to his Discord server, and controversial political messages. Eris Loris threatened to personally hack players that refused to subscribe to his YouTube channel. The Discord server has been found to contain large amounts of offensive content, such as racist language, gore, pornography, and images depicting animal abuse.

A Eurogamer report from October 23, 2020, features an interview with a person claiming to be Eris Loris, conducted via the Discord server from one of the links provided in the hacked games. In the interview, Loris claims he created the bot responsible for the hacks "in only six hours", and had enlisted up to 50 volunteers to form a botnet which boosted the strength of their attacks. Loris claimed that the hack impacted 4.9 million players in 1.5 million games. He added that the hacks were part of a publicity stunt to influence players to vote for Donald Trump in the 2020 United States presidential election.

Innersloth added an in-game message warning players about the hacks on October 22, and released a statement on Twitter the next day. They said they were "super aware" of the hacking issue, and stated that an "emergency server update" would be pushed out to combat the hacks. They encouraged players to stick to private games and to avoid playing on public ones until the update was released. The team plans to address the hacking vulnerabilities as part of a planned overhaul for the game. At the end of January 2021, players reported via Twitter the return of Eris Loris's hack attack, who was distributing Among Us cheats.

=== Missing person rescue ===
On November 1, 2026, 17-year-old Kylie Arellano, who had been missing for 521 days, was rescued in Oregon after having been kidnapped. Arellano had been given a phone without cellular capability, which she used to play the game. She befriended 19-year-old Daniel Tresp while doing so and disclosed her situation, which led to Tresp contacting his mother Khristina, who in turn contacted the FBI.

== Legacy ==
Among Us has done collaborations and cross-overs with other games and studios. The first game they collaborated with was Fall Guys, who added Among Us-themed skins to their game. Characters from Among Us have made cameos in the indie games Astroneer, Space Warlord Organ Trading Simulator, Cosmonious High, Samurai Gunn 2, and Fraymakers, and Among Us is referenced in several stickers in the game A Hat in Time. In a major update in collaboration with Innersloth, indie developer Triband added characters and 35 Among Us-themed levels to the game What the Golf? Several Among Us-themed cards are included in The Binding of Isaac: Four Souls Requiem. Among Us also appears a skin for the Hearts suit in Balatro, using Crewmates in lieu of the King, Queen, and Jack. The Crewmate was added as a playable DLC character in Super Monkey Ball Banana Rumble in January 2025. Triband also developed a similar collaboration for What the Car? in 2025.

Themed skins and cosmetics from other games and properties have been added to Among Us as well: Innersloth and Riot Games crossed-over to bring Arcane themed cosmetics to Among Us. In addition to that, Innersloth has done crossovers with Halo, Ratchet & Clank, and the movie franchise Scream. Cosmetics themed after Benoit Blanc from Glass Onion: A Knives Out Mystery, were made available with the Hide 'N Seek update on December 9, 2022. Cosmetics and pets themed after the game Destiny 2 were added to coincide with Destiny's Lightfall expansion on February 28, 2023. Cosmetics based on Miles Edgeworth from the Ace Attorney series were made available on September 9, 2024, to coincide with the release of the Ace Attorney Investigations Collection. Cosmetics themed from Pusheen was added to the game.

Outside of the game itself Innersloth has collaborated with BT21, and Among Us-themed posters were used to advertise the movie Free Guy. The "ejected" animation was referenced in the season 2 trailer for the animated series Snoopy in Space, and the Emergency Meeting screen was used in In Space with Markiplier. In the manga series Komi Can't Communicate, multiple chapters are dedicated to the game, and sees the characters dressed up as Crewmates.^{[ch. 350, 352–356]} Among Us was also featured as a question on Jeopardy! Among Us is seen being played by characters in the 2022 film Glass Onion: A Knives Out Mystery.

Epic Games featured a community-created game mode in Fortnite Creative in December 2020 called "The Spy Within", which had very similar mechanics to Among Us, in which among ten players, the others have to complete tasks to earn enough coins within a limited time while trying to deduce which two players are trying to sabotage that effort. Epic later added another (official and internally-developed) limited mode to Fortnite called "Impostors" in August 2021, which was recognized as even a closer take on Among Us, as the same basic mechanics as "The Spy Within" were used, but now taking place within an underground bunker with a layout similar to the Among Us map. Innersloth responded in frustration to this mode, which gave no credit to Innersloth. Innersloth's co-founder Marcus Bromander stated "Is it really that hard to put 10% more effort into putting your own spin on it though?", while studio representative Callum Underwood said that Innersloth was open to collaborations, "Just ask and if you follow some basic rules it's usually fine". In an October 2021 blog posting, Epic Games did credit Innersloth and Among Us as inspirations for the "Impostors" mode. On June 17, 2022, both Epic and Innersloth announced a collab between Fortnite and Among Us, with a "back bling" of a Crewmate in interchangeable colors and the "Distraction Dance" from Innersloth's Henry Stickmin franchise available in the Fortnite item shop. An Among Us-themed downloadable content expansion for Vampire Survivors, titled "Emergency Meeting", was released on December 18, 2023.

=== Artificial intelligence research ===
A simplified variation of Among Us called Hidden Agenda is used in the field of multi-agent reinforcement learning to show that artificial intelligence agents are able to learn a variety of social behaviors, including partnering and voting without need for communication in natural language.

== Other games ==
=== Among Us 3D ===
During The Game Awards 2021, a standalone virtual reality game titled Among Us VR was announced. Co-developed by Schell Games, Innersloth, and Robot Teddy, the game was released on November 10, 2022, for the Meta Quest 2 and Windows via Steam, with a PlayStation 5 version via PlayStation VR2 planned for the future. In 2025, it was rebranded to Among Us 3D alongside a version that lacks virtual reality, which released via Steam on May 6.

Among Us 3D features similar gameplay to the original game, but is played from a first-person perspective. Several of the original game's tasks were recreated, alongside new ones. At the time of release, the only level in the game is The Skeld 2; further content updates are planned, though no details have been announced.

=== Among Us Story: On Guard ===
During Summer Game Fest 2026, Innersloth announced a spinoff, Among Us Story: On Guard. It is a single-player narrative adventure game that follows a security guard who must prove their innocence by solving a murder mystery. A demo was released as part of Steam Next Fest from June 15 to 22. It will be released at an unannounced date for personal computers via Steam, as well as on Nintendo Switch and Nintendo Switch 2.

== Adaptations ==
=== Manga ===
On December 28, 2021, H2 Interactive, who publishes Among Us in Japan, announced that a one-shot manga based on the game would be published in Bessatsu CoroCoro's April issue on February 28, 2022.

=== Television ===
On June 27, 2023, it was confirmed that an animated series based on Among Us was being worked on by CBS Studios, from Infinity Train creator Owen Dennis. On March 15, 2024, it was announced that American actors Randall Park, Yvette Nicole Brown, Elijah Wood, and Ashley Johnson would provide voice roles for the series as Red, Orange, Green, and Purple respectively. On March 27, 2024, it was announced that Dan Stevens, Liv Hewson and Kimiko Glenn would join the cast as Blue, Black, and Cyan. On April 4, 2024, it was announced that Debra Wilson, Patton Oswalt, Phil LaMarr and Wayne Knight would join the cast, playing Yellow, White, Brown, and Lime. The first official trailer premiered at Summer Game Fest on June 7, 2024. On June 5, 2026, the series was quietly released on Paramount+, several hours before its intended announcement during Summer Game Fest.

== See also ==
- Impact of the COVID-19 pandemic on the video game industry
- Friendslop
