= The Binding of Isaac: Four Souls =

Card game in the universe of The Binding of Isaac

- Designers: Edmund McMillen, Danielle McMillen, Tyler Glaiel
- Publishers: Studio71 US
- Genres: Card game
- Languages: English
- Players: 2-4

The Binding of Isaac: Four Souls is a card game designed by Edmund McMillen, with additional designs by Danielle McMillen and Tyler Glaiel. Based on the indie video game The Binding of Isaac, players control one of several characters - Isaac, Judas, Maggy, or Cain (and others) - as they defeat bosses to collect Lost Souls. Each character has abilities that impact either them or other players, and players may work cooperatively to defeat bosses and enemies. The first player to acquire four souls wins. A Kickstarter campaign launched on June 27, 2018, and broke its funding goal of $50,000 within the first 1.5 hours.

== Gameplay ==
Each player picks a character at random along with their starting item, 3¢, and 3 loot cards. Loot cards and treasure items are used to aid in attacking enemies and gain advantages over other players.

On a player's turn, they may buy one item from the shop for 10¢, attack a monster, and play one loot card. Each monster battle is handled differently, with some having counters, and some denying certain number rolls. To attack, the player must roll a number greater than or equal to the die value listed on the monster card. Depending on the number, it will either attack the monster or miss, resulting in either the monster or player taking damage, respectively. If the player manages to kill the monster, they will gain certain rewards such as loot or money. If the monster is a boss, the player gains soul(s) in addition to these other rewards. If the player dies, their turn ends, and they discard an item, a loot card, and 1¢. They also deactivate their character, and any activatable items they control.

The first player to obtain 4 souls wins.

== Development ==
The game started its development around 2017 when Javon Frazier of Studio71 US approached McMillen; Studio71 was in the process of making the Cyanide & Happiness card game, Joking Hazard, and had asked McMillen if he was interested in a board game variant of The Binding of Isaac. At that point, McMillen was still focused on developing The End Is Nigh and The Legend of Bum-bo, and declined the offer. About a year later, McMillen had gotten the flu, and during his off-time, came up with a card game variant for The Binding of Isaac. After prototyping enough of the game for about two months, he recontacted Studio71 to work out the fuller details for the game.

Studio71 had suggested the Kickstarter route for gaining funding for the game, as they had used that successfully for Joking Hazard. McMillen was wary, knowing that digital-based Kickstarters could fail, but agreed to using it as long as they had a nearly-ready product to be sold at the start of the Kickstarter, and that he could expand on the game by adding new cards when extended Kickstarter goal tiers were met. Leading up to the Kickstarter in June 2018, McMillen had teased a new Isaac-themed game, and named it on June 25, 2018. The Kickstarter, revealing that this was a card game, was launched two days later; within only a few hours of the launch of the campaign, the project was successfully funded, receiving its goal of $50,000 within the first 1.5 hours. The Kickstarter ended with 38,335 backers pledging a total of $2,650,875.

== Release ==
The basic edition contains eleven characters, their starting items, 107 monster cards, 104 loot cards, 105 treasure cards, 3 bonus soul cards for advanced play, a six sided die, an eight sided die, 100 pennies, and the rulebook. A gold box edition of the game includes an expansion pack with 99 cards, including a random foil card, four characters and their respective starting items, 30 monster cards, 30 loot cards, and 30 treasure cards. The game began shipping to backers in December 2018. During 2019 and 2021, several new cards were made that were given away with Isaac-themed or Edmund related items. One of Tapeworm's Kickstarter goals, another card game made by Edmund, added new cards for Four Souls that added a character, item, and 2 new bosses. Nicalis, a game company Edmund worked with in the past, also gave away cards during certain events via their online store.

== Requiem Expansion ==
In April 2021, an expansion for Four Souls, titled Requiem, was announced in tandem with the release of the Repentance expansion to the video game The Binding of Isaac: Rebirth. The expansion, almost as large as the base game, incorporates items and enemies from Repentance, such as all 17 tainted characters, as well as other content from the original video game. Several cartoonists, including Sam Kieth, Tom Bunk, Alex Pardee, Peach Momoko, and Agnes Garbowska, contributed art to the expansion. On June 1, 2021, the expansion was launched on Kickstarter with a $100,000 goal. According to an update on the project, it was fully funded within 3 minutes of launch and reached $1,000,000 in 90 minutes. The expansion ended on July 1, 2021 and ultimately raised $6,720,471 and ended up being the 17th most successful Kickstarter of all time.

Among the new cards added to the collection are Kickstarter-exclusive "Warp Zone" cards, officially licensed crossovers featuring characters and items from other video games and franchises. They include characters, items, and monsters from Friday Night Funkin', Cave Story, VVVVVV, PG: Psycho Goreman, Enter the Gungeon, Among Us, Hollow Knight, Cyanide & Happiness, The End Is Nigh, Spelunky, Oddworld: Abe's Oddysee, QWOP, Johnny the Homicidal Maniac, The Room, Baba Is You, Dicey Dungeons, Isaac-themed memes, Slay the Spire, Salad Fingers, Hotline Miami, Castle Crashers, Celeste, TowerFall, Nuclear Throne, Don't Starve, The Legend of Bum-bo, Gish, Time Fcuk and Edmund himself.
