= Wydawnictwo MAG =

- Industry: Publishing
- Founder: Jacek Rodek

Wydawnictwo MAG (Polish for: MAG Publishing House), is a publisher that was the first to publish Polish translations of popular American and British role-playing games (RPGs) like Call of Cthulhu and Warhammer Fantasy Roleplay. In more recent years, it has turned to publication of translations of popular English-language novels.

== History ==
=== Magia i Miecz ===
Despite the rise of the role-playing game industry in the United States and the U.K. during the 1980s, very few people in Poland under Communist rule were aware of the existence of role-playing games. Following the fall of Communist rule, Jacek Rodek, the editor-in-chief of Fantaskya, a monthly magazine dedicated to fantasy and science fiction, founded the publishing company Wydawnictwo MAG in order to publish Magia i Miecz (Magic and Sword), a magazine that would be dedicated to role-playing games. Rodek and Darosław J. Toruń were the first editors.

Due to a lack of published role-playing games in Poland at the time, the first six issues of the magazine focussed on Kryształy Czasu (Crystals of Time), an unpublished Polish RPG created by Artur Szyndler. The first issue printed the rules, and subsequent issues featured articles about character generation, magic and spellcasting, and descriptions of the game world. The first full adventures for Kryształy Czasu appeared in issues #4–#6: „Nieproszony gość” ("Uninvited Guest"), „Demoniczna horda” ("Demonic Horde"), and „Pułapki w pułapkach” ("Traps Inside Traps").

MAG published a hardcover version of Kryształy Czasu in 1999.

=== Role-playing games ===
Magia i Miecz's monthly circulation of 20,000 indicated there was an audience for RPGs in Poland, so MAG acquired the Polish-language licenses for several popular British and American role-playing games, including:

- Warhammer Fantasy Roleplay
- Call of Cthulhu
- Deadlands
- Fading Suns
- Earthdawn
- Middle-earth Role Playing

MAG released Polish-language editions of several tabletop games, notably Doomtrooper, and the Kult collectible card game (CCG), and also published some original Polish RPGs such as Wiedźmin - Gra Wyobraźni (The Witcher: A Game of Imagination), based on a series of novels and short stories written by Andrzej Sapkowski.

=== Book publisher ===
By 2001, Magia i Miecz had become unprofitable as its circulation waned to 10,000. MAG stopped publishing the magazine, and pivoted from role-playing games to books, specializing in science-fiction, horror and fantasy, children's literature and contemporary fiction, primarily translations of popular English-language novels. Its long-running Uczta Wyobraźni (Feast of the Imagination) series, started in 2006, features over 60 works by authors such as Ian McDonald, William Gibson, Christopher Priest, Susannah Clarke, and Bruce Sterling. MAG has also enjoyed great success republishing the works of Neil Gaiman and Christopher Paolini — in 2005–2006, Polish sales of Paolini's novel Eragon topped 135,000.

MAG also publishes novels by well-known Polish writers such as Feliks W. Kres.

== Awards ==
- In 1994, MAG founder Jacek Rodek was presented with the Śląkfa, Poland's oldest award for science fiction and fantasy, as Publisher of the Year.
- In 2001, MAG Editor-in-Chief Andrzej Miszkurka was presented with the Śląkfa as Publisher of the Year, and MAG author Feliks Kres received the Śląkfa as Writer of the Year.
- In 2006, MAG Editor-in-Chief Andrzej Miszkurka was presented with the Śląkfa as Publisher of the Year.
