= Kryształy Czasu =

Polish role-playing game

Kryształy Czasu (Crystals of Time) was one of the first Polish role-playing games.

It was released in 1993 by Artur Szyndler in the Magia i Miecz magazine. By this point the game already had a loyal fan base which had developed during the late Communist era, despite the game's association with western ideas in the eyes of Poland's Communist government. In 1998 a print edition was released by Wydawnictwo MAG. The setting was a fantasy world, dominated by the orcs - who, unlike in most fantasy settings, were the most advanced and civilized race. The game mechanic was based on d100. Players of the 1993 version provided test data for the use of more varied character types in the 1998 version, including a better understanding of the unique aspects of female characters.

In 2014 Artur Szyndler published the first part of a planned fantasy series set in this universe.
