= Crystalicum =

Tabletop role-playing game

Crystalicum is a Polish role-playing game released in 2006. It is set in a fantasy universe (with magic and such) but involving outer space environment (thus similar to the Spelljammer game). Much of the art is manga-style.

There is also a collectible card game of the same name set in this universe, released in 2005.

The card game consists of a Crystalicum: Crystal Edition basic set ("Crystalicum: Edycja Kryształowa") and two expansions - Under Set Sails ("Pod Pełnymi Żaglami") and Stronger than the Sword ("Silniejsze od Miecza"). The preparation of a second edition set - Crystalicum: War of Shadows ("Crystalicum: Wojna Cieni") has been announced on the game's forum by one of the people affiliated with the project.

The role-playing game features The Known Universe ("Znany Wszechświat") - a guide to the game's setting in the form of the memoirs of Marco di Mirandeo and a player's handbook ("Crystalicum: Kryształowa Gra Fabularna"). For some time it looked as if the RPG part of the project would come to a halt, with the news/rumour of one of the authors leaving and taking the copyrights for unreleased material with him, but the publication of the game master's guide has been announced recently for 2008.

== The Setting ==
=== The Worlds ===
The game features numerous planets for the GM to use as a setting for his party's adventures, and since quite a number of maps depicting formerly charted space have been lost, new ones can be added as one wills it.

In-game they are called worlds, as the term (and name) Planet is reserved for a single world, which is also considered to be the centre of the universe.

=== The Void (Pustka) ===
In-between the worlds players find what is called the Void. The Void however is anything but empty. Most notably it contains a breathable atmosphere, and is a habitat for a number of species (mostly, but not exclusively, based on fish). The temperature of the Void seems to be higher than that on some of the planets.

Gravity seems to work most of the time, but the issue of "where is up and down" in the Void has yet to be established. While on a ship, down is towards the deck, when you fall out of a vessel however, you more or less hurl through the Void, until you [or your corpse] get caught by a world's gravitational pull, or a ship stumbles upon you and decides to take you on board). Also, the card Ingenious Maneuver ("Błyskotliwy Manewr") features the following flavor text:

Did you see that? He flew with his deck upside-down! I had no idea it is possible!
- Luciano de Vela

Widziałeś? Przeleciał pokładem w dół! Nie miałem pojęcia, że to możliwe!
- Luciano de Vela

==== The Great Void (Wielka Pustka) ====
The Great Void is a vast stretch of the Void surrounding the Known Universe. Due to the lack of planets or even substantial rocks, preventing placing even a small resupply point for ships, it has for a long time been an impassable barrier, and the object of many tales regarding what (if anything) lies beneath. Recently however, Cristobal Catarribera y Natalez Salazar de Vela, the Dragon Prince, ruler of the Dragon Dwarves led an expedition meant to traverse and see what lies beyond the Great Void.

The Card Game expansion "Under Set Sails" takes place after the return of the expedition, proving that there are worlds inhabited by till then unknown races beyond the Great Void.

The Role-Playing Game is a bit unclear on its specific time placement. While the Great Void is mentioned as impassable in the player's guide, "The Known Universe" ends with the protagonist telling the news of the Dragon King's expedition's return and deciding to travel to the newly discovered worlds.

=== The Red Moon ===
A unique celestial body, the Red Moon travels between worlds in a somewhat erratic, yet possible to predict pattern (astronomers have devised ways to establish the Red Moon's course, and some people are born with the innate ability of sensing its coming to the world they are on). It is the scourge of all beings, as whatever living thing is basked in its light mutates both physically and mentally, becoming a raving monster.

The term "monster" in Crystalicum applies only to the victims of the Red Moon, be they a sentient race, animal or plant.

=== Crystal ===
One of the most widely featured extraordinary substances in Crystalicum. Found on all worlds save one (The Planet), it develops underneath the Earth's surface and is therefore mined and extracted. The crystal has numerous uses. After being set in a special socket it can bestow the socketed item with special or magical properties. It can be used as a battery for crystal-based weaponry. Crystals power the Void-faring ships' engines. In fact, they power many more or less mundane devices, usually fitted to the crystal's elemental manifestation. They are also an integral part of focuses - items characters with magical abilities use to perform their magic (a Crystal fit to be set in a focus is both rare and valuable, since it cannot be worked in any way, and must have developed the right shape naturally).

Though coming from beneath the earth, most Crystals require sunlight to fuel their powers. A Crystal that has expended its energy takes more or less thirty hours in the sun to recharge, half the time if it is recharged in the Void. Other, more effective means of recharging a Crystal do exist however.

Crystal develops an elemental affinity, according to the nature of the world it comes from.

Air Crystals - translucent Crystals which distort light, creating tiny rainbows around them, they are found on cold and windy worlds. Affiliated with the mind, genius and deception. These Crystals can increase one's perception, cause a chameleon effect, outright invisibility, cause an item to glow, allow a weapon to fight on its own or bestow the ability to fly (which makes them the power source for world-faring ships).

Earth Crystals - dark green Crystals found on worlds with a rich flora and fauna. Affiliated with energy, life and power. They can cause additional wounds on a successful hit, increase a character's strength or dexterity and agility, make the character more resistant to wounds, imbue it with the power of regeneration or repair broken items. They also have a distinct ability - they can store twice as much energy as other Crystals of the same level could, which makes them the most common choice where a crystal is used only as a source of power (e.g. machines).

Fire Crystals - glowing red Crystals found on dry and hot worlds. Affiliated with the untouchable sphere of life that is luck. Fire Crystals can cause darkness, allow one to see in it, drain elemental energy used against a character, increase its luck or speed or cure diseases. Fire Crystals have the most straightforward manifestation of power among crystals, which makes them widely used in heating devices, weaponry, but also in ship engines.

Water Crystals - dark-azure Crystals found on worlds with high humidity - ones that have a lot of rivers and lakes, vast seas, regular downpours or are shrouded in mist all the time. Affiliated with the spirit, relations between beings and all things ever-changing. They allow the weapon to deal poisoned or stunning strikes, pass through an opponent's armor, let the character comprehend languages, shapeshift or strengthen its will. These Crystals are rarely used for non-magic purposes, partially because their powers are the most enigmatic and least known.

Crystals can also hold spells within them. The Crystal's affinity has to correspond with the type of magic it is supposed to hold, its size must also be sufficient. Once in a Crystal, a spell can be released by anyone simply by shattering it, making it a means of access to magic for non-spellcasters, or for spellcasters to have a quick spell ready for dire emergencies. The obvious downsides are the single-use nature of such item, as well as the fixed nature of a spell contained inside.

=== Overmetal (Nadmetal) ===
Another extraordinary substance, Overmetal is one of the things that differentiate a common character from a hero. The substance, also mined from beneath a world's earth, can be used to make weapons, armor and items of extraordinary durability and high quality. However its true value shows when used by characters who "resonate" with Overmetal. It then grows with the wielder/owner, increasing in power, gaining abilities, and changing its appearance to reflect his/her power and character. By default, all player characters resonate and start with an Overmetal item (known as that character's Overmetal Heritage [Nadmetalowe Dziedzictwo]).

One of the benefits of possessing an item crafted from this ore (and resonating with it), is the possibility of having special slots for Crystals in it, which imbue the item and/or its owner with additional powers (usually called upon when needed). A Crystal placed in an Overmetal item does not need sunshine, instead drawing upon the owner's life force to recharge. Recharging a Crystal in such a way usually takes only a few hours.

=== The Gift ===
The ability to harness one's magic ability. If a character is not born with the Gift, he or she will most probably never be able to use magic, unless some extraordinary circumstances arise (some say the Prophet was not able to use magic until his return with the Crystal Hand).

A character's Gift is dependent on his or her race, and cannot be changed. To tap into it, aside from training, a focus is required. A focus is a specific item (tied to the gifted player's race) with a special crystal set within (its affinity also tied to the gift), that holds no power aside from channeling magical energy.

The study of magic is divided into paths. There are universal paths, available to every race, focusing on the harness and use of magic, and race-specific paths, which allow the channeling of specific effects.

A gifted character also has better control over spells contained within Crystals. The attitude towards the practice of storing spells this way differs from race to race. The Ice Elves combat the practice of capturing their spells in Crystals for use by anyone of not Ice Elven descent. The Dwarves on the other hand, with their utilitarian approach to magic, have no trouble selling Crystals with their spells within.

Attitudes towards gifted ones are as differed as the worlds themselves, and on some spellcasters are in-born elites, on some they are revered, other worlds hold spellcasting as just another respectable professions, while on certain worlds the gifted are outright hunted.

== Cultures and races ==
=== The Ice Elven Dominion (Cesarstwo Lodowych Elfów) ===
The Ice Elven Dominion
- Current Ruler: Kaiser Gerasimos Pagos*
- Capital World: Alexandreon
- Races: Ice Elves, Common Elves
- Core Worlds: Ochuroma, Zemos
- Former Rulers: Alexandreos Megas, Unnamed Kaiser (supposed father of Eirene Dasma)
- In the card game the "Gerasimos Pagos" card bears the function "Kaiser of the Ice Elves". In "The Known Universe" however it is said that the Unnamed Kaiser named Eirene Dasma his successor. It is also said that Gerasimos Pagos used his influence to arrange a marriage with her, thus gaining the title of First Consort, though using the title of Kaiser.

There do not exist boundaries which cannot be passed, spaces which cannot be traversed, nor wonders which cannot be comprehended. It takes only for us to extend our hand, and we shall reach the stars.
- Alexandreos Megas

Nie istnieją granice, których nie można przekroczyć, przestrzenie, których nie można przebyć ani cuda, których nie da się pojąć. Wystarczy, że wyciągniemy rękę, a sięgniemy gwiazd.
- Alexandreos Megas

==== The Path of the Mind ====
Focus: Even though it's called a bracelet, it resembles a glove worn on the right hand, with an Air Crystal set in the palm. As it grows, it climbs up the forearm, it's Overmetal threads forming more intricate lines and patterns. The hand part however, alters significantly less, especially the part touching the palm, which stays flat the entire time, making this focus unobstructive in nature, allowing the character to even wield a weapon in that hand effectively.

==== Factions ====
The Ice Elves are divided into coteries, which were originally established by the Kaiser to augment his power. Each coterie has some purpose or specialisation, and while not all of its members are solely devoted to it, it can be reasonably expected for a member of a coterie to be reasonable knowledgeable/proficient in his/her coterie's intended role.

As times changed, some coteries dissipated, while new ones have been created. Also, some worlds with only a marginal Ice Elven populace are known to have coteries whose members are tied only by being members of it, with no focus on a skill or role whatsoever.

Known coteries include, but are not limited to:

The Dikastirio Coterie This coterie focuses on political influence. Most diplomats and ambassadors hail from it. Originally it was meant to strengthen the Kaiser's political influence on conquered worlds, but with the decline of the Dominion, its members turned to political games within the Dominion itself. Most Kaisers in recent history have hailed from this coterie, and even today, when the formal Kaiser is Eirene Dasma, its influence on Ice Elven politics in the form of Gerasimos Pagos can be strongly felt.

The Dioxi Coterie A relatively new coterie (no more than a few hundred years old), it was formed some time after the Gnomes opened up for trade and services. Its purpose is to search the universe for Crystals containing Ice Elven spells and repossess or destroy them. Also, if said Crystals happen to be owned by a Gnome from the Guild of Gloves, said Gnome can prepare himself for a very painful death.

The Krystallos Coterie A coterie devoted to the study and practice of magic. Most of its members are Gifted, some however only aid the theoretical aspect of studying magic (in such cases they usually focus on the Gifts of other races). While not all Gifted Ice Elves join this coterie, most Gifted members of other coteries have discovered their abilities after leaving the nursery. Due to the nature of the Ice Elven Gift, this coterie is both feared and revered even by other Ice Elves.

The Naftis Coterie A coterie from which most ship captains in the Dominion are recruited. Its members are expected to be masterful captains and fleet commanders. The current Kaiser, Eirene Dasma hails from this coterie, and since she's been brought up to be a ship captain most of her life, she runs the Dominion not unlike as if she'd run a ship.

The Proaspizo Coterie Created for a single purpose - waging war against the Dwarves. Even though the Ice Elves lost the war against them, this coterie has not been disbanded, and its members are still active, though their role has shifted towards instigation and sabotage, instead of outright conflict. However, if there's a clash between Dwarven and Elven forces, you can expect members of this coterie to play some role in it.

The Zamoi Coterie A "diasporan"-type coterie gathering all the Ice Elves from Zemos. One day, all of its members disappeared from the face of the world, and their palace stands empty to this day, not even the locals dare enter it. Gerasimos Pagos sent out one of his agents to solve the mystery of their disappearance. If the inhabitants of Zemos turn out to be responsible, the agent is to organize a massive genocide, killing every fifth of them.

== History ==
year 0 - The Rise of the Ice Elven Dominion. Alexandreos Megas, the leader of the Ice Elves, finishes a long lasting campaign aimed at subjugating all the inhabitants of his homeworld. After destroying the last focal point of Common Elven resistance, he assumes the title of Kaiser and declares the beginning of a new calendar, which will become the chronological base for most of the Known Universe.

Soon afterwards Alexandreos moves to conquer other worlds in the universe. How he came to possess technology allowing him to traverse the Void, and why did he fixate himself on the fact that there are in fact other inhabited worlds, remains a mystery even today.

year 1 - year 500 Glory of the Dominion. The rule of the Ice Elves extends over more and more worlds. For their inhabitants, the invasion of the Kaiser's army is the first contact with any race hailing from outside their homeworld. The borders of the Dominion expand quickly, and with it comes cruel slavery on the one hand, and a great technological and cultural progress on the other. The propagation of inter-stellar travel, writing, or a code of laws not dependent solely on the whims of a ruler are just some of the things most races owe to the Ice Elves.

year 287 Time of the Red Moon. From this time comes the oldest known written account regarding the appearance of the Red Moon, which eclipses the sun, turns animals into raving monsters, and causes sentient beings to succumb to a murderous fury. From the writing's tone however, one may assume that the Red Moon existed earlier, and that the Ice Elves had to deal with its effects before.

year 502 The Discovery of Astonia. The Ice Elven fleet reaches the borders of the Federation of Astonia and, for the first time, encounters a race aware that a multitude of worlds exists. Nevertheless, the Kaiser spares no time in waging war, which turns out to be disastrous - the invading fleet is all but decimated, and the Elves suffer their first defeat in the history of the Dominion. Rancorous, the Kaiser orders to destroy all accounts regarding the failed invasion, and all maps showing the way to the Federation.

year 753 The Discovery of the Nine Cities. The Ice Elven fleet discovers the Planet, and the inhabited platforms orbiting around it. The humans living on them, while not able to construct a ship capable of Void-faring, have no problem making vessels which take flight long enough to move between platforms or to and from the Planet. Their civilization turns out to be ancient. The true origin of the platforms and the mystery of their settling has never been solved.

year 812 The Beginning of the Elven-Dwarven War. The Kaiser's forces, after a long and taxing campaign, manages to occupy Terra Nostra, the homeworld of the Dragon Dwarves. They do not manage, however, to quell the Dwarven resistance. A war erupts, which, its tides shifting from one side to the other, will continue for almost six hundred years.

year 1104 The Appearance of the City of Gnomes. A mysterious object appears on the orbit of one of the worlds of the Dominion - a city built entirely out of an unknown metal, shifting through space on its own. After exactly seven days it disappears, only to emerge a while later in a completely different spot in the Universe. The Gnomes inhabiting the city are unfriendly and distrustful at first, over time however, they become a race of traders, and their city the biggest market in the Known Universe.

year 1171 A Turn in the Elven-Dwarven War. The Ice Elven Dominion, existing for twelve centuries, is slowly verging towards its downfall. An evident sign of that is the fact that the Dwarves are gaining the upper hand in the war. They've managed to drive back the occupying forces from Terra Nostra, and take the fight into the reaches of space. Soon, the fleet of the Dragon King celebrates its first victories, and the Dwarves begin a campaign aimed at freeing other worlds from the thrall of the Dominion. Doing so, they establish the League of the Free, whose purpose is to bring down the Ice-Elven Dominion.

year 1200 The Prophet's Speech. The ruler of Cardhuel, a world on the fringe of the Universe, returns from exile, brought upon him by the Ice Elves occupying his world. He is terribly mutilated - his eyes have been gouged out, and his right hand cut off - yet the lost limb is replaced by a Crystal Hand, an artifact of unimaginable power. Freeing his world from the rule of the Dominion, he begins to preach a doctrine, which will become the foundation of the Church of the Crystal. This year is year 0 according to the Imperial Calendar.

year 1223 The Beginning of the Empire's Expansion. After the Prophet's death, his grandson becomes Cardhuel's ruler. He puts into motion the Prophet's ideal of bringing the teachings of the Church to the farthest reaches of the Universe. To this end he establishes Knight Orders, and begins conquering nearby worlds, coupled with a forced conversion of their inhabitants to faith in the Crystal. Thanks to the power of the Living Crystal, the Crystal Knights turn out to be unstoppable, and their domain expands at an astonishing rate. The Prophet's grandson takes on the title of Emperor, and dubs his domain the Crystal Empire.

ca. year 1350 The Second Phase of the Empire's Expansion. The Imperial conquests are starting to lose momentum, and each successive Emperor mitigates the policy of border expansion. As a result, more worlds accept the faith in Crystal voluntarily, largely retaining their cultural diversity and overall autonomy. An especially vivid example of this policy are the Nine Cities, which nominally accept the Empire's sovereignty, in reality however, this fact has no effect on their culture or politics.

year 1392 The Rediscovery of Astonia. Dwarven travellers discover anew the forgotten route to Astonia. The animal-men nation does not establish any contact, be it mercantile or diplomatic. Instead, it tightens its borders, sealing itself off from any foreign influence.

year 1448 The Third Phase of the Empire's Expansion. The Emperor, having become enamoured with the Nine Cities' culture, decides to move his capitol there. Before he sets his plan in motion however, he dies in mysterious circumstances. His death marks the date during which the Empire returns to its policy of annexation and repressing other cultures. The rulers of the Nine Cities manage to keep their privileges by nothing short of a miracle.

year 1460 Twilight of the Dominion. The Kaiser's fleet is ultimately defeated by the League of the Free during the battle for Stars. In doing so, the Dwarven fleet paves a way to Alexandreon, the Dominion's capitol. The Dragon King however, decides not to make a final strike at the Ice Elves, instead opening peace talks. The defeated Kaiser is forced to recognize the liberated worlds' independence, retaining control over only a few worlds closest to Alexandreon.

year 1464 The Moon Dwarves' Exodus. Princess Castelhana II, the only Dwarven ruler free from the Dragon King's influence, breaks an age-long religious taboo, sending her first expeditions onto the arboreous moon orbiting Terra Nostra. Upon discovering it is habitable, she avoids recognizing the Dragon King's superiority, while gradually and secretly relocating her subjects to the moon. There, she declares herself the ruler of the sovereign Moon Kingdom and her subordinates begin their war with the Dragon Kingdom.

year 1491 Birth of Marco di Mirandeo. In the City of Pillars, one of the Nine Cities, Marco di Mirandeo is born. Fated to become a traveller, his memoirs will become one of the most popular sources of knowledge regarding the Known Universe, especially the mysterious Astonia.

year 1509 The First Crystal Crusade to Astonia. The Emperor makes an ill-fated decision to begin a Crystal Crusade aimed at subjugating Astonia, converting it to the Crystal Church. The Order of Earth leading it had some decent success at first, after a while however, it met with heavy enemy resistance, and was pushed back from the Federation's borders.

year 1511 The Second Crystal Crusade to Astonia. Furious because of the Crusade's failure, the Emperor gathers a gigantic fleet, over which he takes command personally, and makes a second attempt at conquering Astonia. The Crusade ends with the Empire's mysterious crushing defeat - only a handful of survivors flee the Federation, relaying both weird and mutually contradictive accounts of the massacre. Casualties of that battle include the heads of the Earth and Fire orders, as well as the Emperor himself. The Empire also lost the Crystal Hand, the symbol of reign over the Empire.

year 1512 Civil War in the Empire. Left without the Emperor to look over them, the Orders begin fighting for dominance over the Empire. The war lasts five years, crippling the already weakened Empire - worlds left without the Orders' supervision begin to vie for independence, and the Crystal Church is losing its faithful at an alarming rate. After numerous bloody battles, the Order of Earth emerges on top, its grand master decides however not to assume the title of Emperor.

year 1515 Discovery of the New Universe. Dwarven sailors, under the command of the Grand Admiral of the Dragon Kingdom himself, are the first in history to find a way to traverse the Void surrounding the Known Universe, and find new worlds on its other side. Their monopoly for travel across the Great Void is soon broken by the Moon Dwarves, and the conflict between the two factions moves to their colonies.
