= Mars First Logistics =

2025 video game

- Developer: Shape Shop
- Publishers: Shape Shop, Outersloth
- Designer: Ian MacLarty
- Platform: Windows
- Release: June 2023 (early access); Sep 25, 2025 (full release)
- Modes: Single-player, multiplayer

Mars First Logistics is an indie transport simulation video game developed by the Melbourne-based studio Shape Shop and published by Shape Shop and Outersloth. The game was released in early access in June 2023 for Windows, and saw a full release on September 25, 2025. The game, which includes single-player and up to 3-player cooperative multiplayer, takes place in a future, science fiction setting, and revolves around building rovers and other forms of vehicles to transport various unusual items across Mars and aid in its colonization. It was positively received by critics, who cited its gameplay as unique and enjoyable.

== Gameplay ==
The gameplay loop starts when the player receives a contract to deliver an item. The player must then purpose-build a vehicle for delivering it, accounting for its unusual proportions and attributes, pick up the item, and bring it to its destination successfully.

== Reception ==
Luke Plunkett of Kotaku described the game as a "physics puzzler" at heart, comparing its vehicle-building gameplay to Kerbal Space Program or The Legend of Zelda: Tears of the Kingdom in how difficult it is to make a working vehicle. However, he noted that the game's "cute" handling blunted any failures with humor, comparing it to "an adorable little blooper reel". He praised the game's humor, but also its in-depth building system, saying that he spent the most time on the game's building screen tinkering with the vehicles. Jonathan Bolding of PC Gamer similarly described the game's failures as "hysterical", praising the open-world aspect of the game as not feeling "tacked-on". Marie Armondi of Multiplayer.it wrote that the game was not extremely varied, and it was best for people who were patient. Graham Smith of Rock Paper Shotgun lauded its graphical style, which he compared to the art of Moebius.
