= This War of Mine: The Board Game =

2017 Polish cooperative board game

- Years active: 2017–present
- Genres: Cooperative, war
- Players: 1–6
- Playing time: Advertised: 45–120 minutes Actual: Some games may run past 5 hours

This War of Mine: The Board Game is a 2017 Polish cooperative board game published by Awaken Realms, designed by Michal Oracz and Jakub Wiśniewski as an adaptation of the video game This War of Mine. It has been noted for its bleak, unforgiving gameplay, often forcing players into ethical dilemmas. A war game from the perspective of civilians trying to survive a conflict that is primarily based on the siege of Sarajevo, it was announced in November 2015 by 11 Bit Studios, the video game's developer; after a successful Kickstarter campaign in 2016, it was released through several distributors the following year. While agreed upon by reviewers to not be a "fun" game, it has received mostly favorable reviews for its role as an artistic statement or educational tool.

== Background ==
In November 2014, the Polish game development company 11 Bit Studios published This War of Mine, a war survival video game following the perspective of civilians, based on the siege of Sarajevo among other conflicts. The game proved popular, and has been adapted to a number of platforms beyond the original Microsoft Windows, MacOS, and Linux. Android and iOS ports debuted in July 2015. The video game has been well-received, with "universal acclaim" on iOS and "generally favorable" reviews on Windows and consoles, according to the aggregator Metacritic as of October 2023.

A year after the video game's launch, 11 Bit Studios announced that they would be partnering with Michal Oracz (known for Neuroshima Hex!) and Jakub Wiśniewski to create a board game adaptation. 11 Bit launched a Kickstarter campaign in May 2016, raising £621,811 against a goal of £40,000 with 9,627 backers. Kickstarter copies began shipping in May 2017 through Awaken Realms and Gamefound, with English- and Polish-language retail sales (Note: According to Galakta, the French and Spanish editions were published by Edge Entertainment, Russian by Crowd Games, German by Asmodee Deutschland, Czech by ALBI Česká republika, and Italian by Pendragon Game Studio.) beginning in October through Galakta Games.

== Gameplay ==
This War of Mine: The Board Game is designed as a faithful reproduction or adaptation of the video game. It is meant to be "instant-play"—playable straight out of the box without needing to read the rules first. Similar to a video game's tutorial, a small booklet, the Journal, teaches the basic rules. The rest are scattered throughout the much longer Book of Scripts, although players will not encounter every rule. Most of the 2,000 entries in the Book of Scripts, however, are custom scenarios that can arise in the course of the game, triggered by various game elements. The game can be played solitaire or as a cooperative game of two to six people. In cooperative mode the gameplay rules are the same as in solitaire, with decisions made by a rotating Leader in consultation with the others. Players do not control individual characters, but rather jointly control a slate of characters, all civilians in fictional Pogoren.

Status tokens track characters' wellbeing and determine how many actions they can take. Here, all characters have lost their third action due to having it blacked out on at least one token, and the second-from-left character has lost their second action as well.

The gameplay is broken into days. In daytime, characters can use a limited number of actions to engage in tasks such as building appliances or digging out parts of the building where they have sought shelter. Appliances provide small but crucial advantages in subsequent gameplay; by design, it is not possible to build everything one might need. At night, some characters scavenge for supplies and try to avoid violence or making too much noise, while others brace for a raid on the shelter. Tokens track each character's fatigue, hunger, illness, misery, and wounds. They also indicate the number of actions available (zero to three), with white dots becoming blacked out as levels increase. Allowing any token to reach level four will in most cases cause the character to either die or flee. Some increases in level are inevitable. For instance, all players who scavenge or defend the shelter at night gain one fatigue.

"I'm sure you can 'win'—I haven't yet—but at what cost? I mean, you can do really bad things in this game in the name of survival. You will have really bad things done to your characters in the name of survival. And that's a really tough bridge to cross."

— Tom Vasel, The Dice Tower

Players turn through a new event each in-game day, until reaching the "Ceasefire" card near the bottom of the events deck. The game is divided into three chapters, with the events in each phase worse than those in the last. Each chapter comes with a randomized objective, which brings a reward if completed and a penalty if not. Events and entries from the Book of Scripts, sometimes triggered by cards marked "Reality Impact", lead to considerable randomness, such as rats eating all of the characters' food. Many scenarios in the Book of Scripts present ethical dilemmas, such as whether to steal food, eat a cat, or mug an elderly woman.

Games can run for five or more hours and normally end unpleasantly—often with the death of all characters. Success in the game is often considered more a matter of surviving than truly winning.

== Variants and expansions ==
The board has an "Advanced" side with a different configuration. The basic game ships with two scenario options that alter gameplay. Galakta Games released an expansion in 2018, Tales from the Ruined City, adding five new scenarios, a new character (Emira, a cat), and modules including sewers beneath the city. Some of these features were stretch goals of the Kickstarter campaign; Kickstarter backers had the option of buying the remaining features as an upgrade. Galakta released a second expansion, Days of the Siege, the following year. Its additions included a new campaign titled Forlorn Hope and an "Orphans of War" module.

== Reception ==
Early prototype reviews in The A.V. Club, Eurogamer, and Polygon were optimistic. Samantha Nelson of The A.V. Club and Johnny Chiodini of Eurogamer emphasized the game's "ruthlessness" and "bleakness" respectively. Charlie Hall of Polygon followed up with a review of the finalized game, describing the events as "staggering" but criticizing the lack of connection between individual player and individual character. Charles Theel in Ars Technica praises the game's immersion as "its primary achievement", in particular the moral decisions that must be made on behalf of one's characters, but more critically writes that "a huge portion of the game is bookkeeping—sliding counters around the board, shuffling decks of cards, and amassing tokens".

Both Hall and The Dice Tower's Tom Vasel criticize the decision to split the rules between the Journal and the Book of Scripts. Hall bemoans the time spent cross-referencing between the two books, causing the game to run much longer than the advertised maximum two hours. He concludes that the game is "a noble effort" but flawed structurally, and recommends the video game instead. Vasel argues that the system creates a lack of structure and that the inclusion of script numbers on cards is confusing. (Note: A note clarifying this is included in a subsequent errata sheet by Galakta.) Theel, on the other hand, praises the approach, writing that "it can be maddening for those wanting control, but this is intentional. The lack of authority, in combination with a reliance on very random and admittedly arbitrary outcomes, is a lesson in letting go. This unsettling goal of reducing player autonomy leaves you feeling helpless and confused at times—which is the point. It's one of the game's most effective tricks."

Hall, Theel, and Vasel all describe the game as not fun, but in the case of the latter two this is juxtaposed with overall favorable opinions. Vasel compares the game to a film that one might see and appreciate the artistic merit of, but would not watch a second time, in contrast with a "popcorn flick". Theel views This War of Mine as "not 'fun' in a traditional sense, but ... engaging and tense[,] ... an ordeal that seeks to educate and impart empathy". Vasel closes his review by "depressingly" recommending the game, after a caveat to those unfamiliar with the franchise that they should "know what [they're] getting [themselves] in for" due to the game's bleakness. Theel discusses at length the brutality of This War of Mine's world and the general lack of satisfying outcomes, concluding, "It's a depressing vision of existence—but one that deserves to be experienced".

In 2022, Comic Book Resources ranked This War of Mine: The Board Game as the third-greatest board game based on a video game, after Fallout: The Board Game and The Witcher Adventure Game. The same year, Alfonso Iglesias Amorín, writing in Clío, praised the game's applicability as a teaching aid to convey history's lessons and foster historical empathy, alongside other contemporary games such as Secret Hitler.

== Since publication ==
Wiśniewski again collaborated with 11 Bit for the board game adaptation of their 2018 video game Frostpunk, which like This War of Mine is designed as a direct translation from device to table.

In 2022, at the outbreak of the full-scale Russian invasion of Ukraine, Awaken Realms and 11 Bit sold off all remaining Kickstarter copies of This War of Mine: The Board Game, with all revenue (past that to offset taxes and shipping) going to the Rakiety Oncological Foundation, which was evacuating cancer patients into Poland, and the Ukrainian Red Cross Society. They raised €48,000, on top of an earlier $850,000 raised by 11 Bit for the Red Cross through pledging a week of video game sales.
