= Neuroshima Hex! =

2005 board game

- Cover of Neuroshima Hex! (first edition)
- Designers: Michał Oracz
- Publishers: Portal (Portal Publishing House)
- Publication: 2005
- Genres: tactical, Post-apocalyptic, military science fiction
- Players: 2–4
- Setup time: 5 minutes
- Playing time: 20 minutes – 2 hours (player dependent)
- Chance: medium
- Skills: tactics

Neuroshima Hex
- Developer: Big Daddy's Creations
- Publisher: Big Daddy's Creations
- Platforms: Apple iOS, Google Android
- Release: WW: 17 September 2010
- Genre: Board game
- Mode: single-player

Neuroshima Hex! is a Polish tactical board game based on the Neuroshima role-playing game. It is designed by Michał Oracz and published in 2005 by Portal (Portal Publishing House), with second edition in 2008 and third in 2013. The game is set in the same post-apocalyptic world as its RPG counterpart.

Neuroshima Hex is essentially a much more complex version of War. In terms of strategy, Neuroshima Hex is similar to chess in that play emphasizes correct placement of pieces on the board, with occasional combat removing pieces from the board.

The game is also available as a video game, with rules essentially identical to the board game, albeit with combat between tiles automated via software.

It became the first Polish board game that gained international popularity and has been called the "legend" of the Polish board gaming scene.

== Setting ==
The game is set in the United States in the mid-21st century, after a nuclear war started by a cybernetic revolt, which molded the continent into a barren wasteland. The reason for the war were actions of a Skynet-like sentient Artificial Intelligence commonly referred to as Moloch that now controls the whole north of the U.S. On the south, there is another creation, called the Neojungle, that poses a threat to those who survived the war. It is a semi-intelligent carnivorous vegetation that grows very quickly, advancing north from Latin America. Right in the middle, there are humans, mixed with mutant creatures, some bred by Moloch and hostile towards humans, and some simply animals and humans misshapen by nuclear fallout.

== Gameplay ==
Neuroshima Hex is played on a hexagonal board. Each player periodically draws from a deck of hexagonal tiles. Tiles symbolize different types of military units. Annotations on the tiles denote the combat strength of each unit. Each player has one special tile called HQ (headquarters) and the objective of the game is to reduce the enemy's HQ from 20 hit points to 0. Players take turns placing their tiles, representing units and modules (augments) on the board.

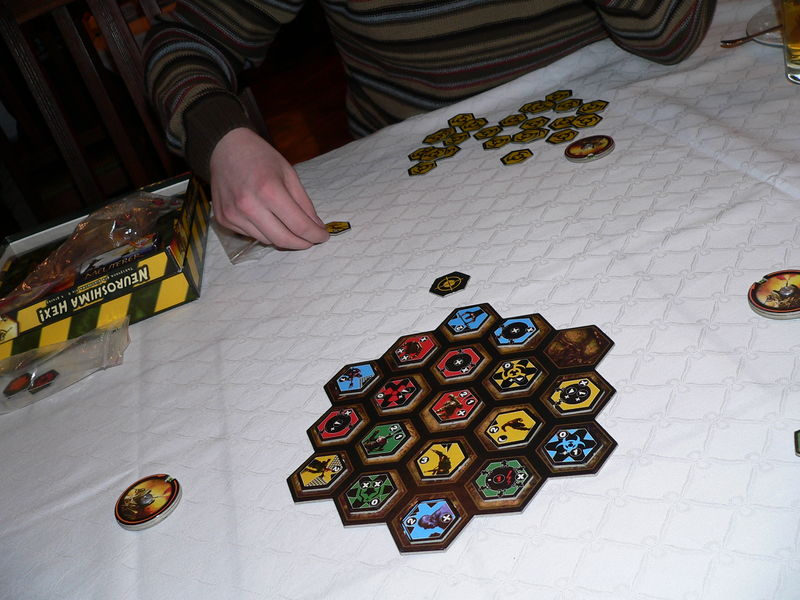
Game in progress (1st edition)

At the start of each player's turn, they draw three tiles at random from their deck. One tile must be discarded. The remaining two tiles may be placed on the board. Players take turns in this fashion until the board is partially populated with tiles. Eventually, a player will draw a tile that allows the player to initiate combat, which will cause destruction of many tiles and damage to the players HQ.

The base game offers four armies (Moloch's Robots, Borgo's mutants, and two human factions, denoted by four different color schemes for tiles), which differ in their strength, mobility, and flexibility, as denoted by differing annotations on each army's tiles. Normally, the game is played by two players, although three and four player variations exist.

== Publication ==
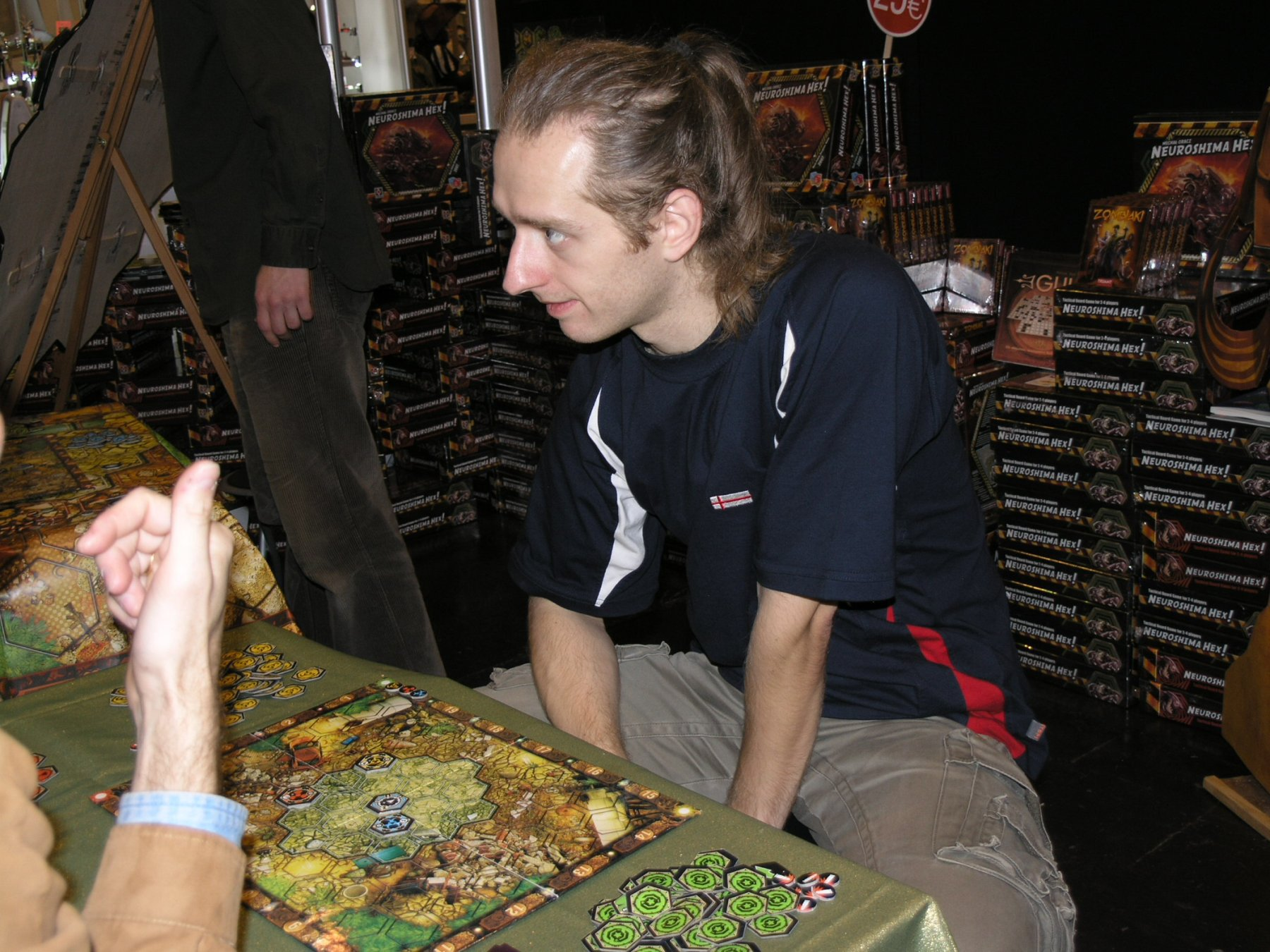
Michał Oracz presents the game's second edition at Essen Spiel 2007

A second edition (in English) was released at SPIEL (the Essen game fair) in 2007, and a promotional 5th army (Doomsday Machine) was given to buyers at the Portal Publishing booth. At Pionek (a game convention in Gliwice, Poland) in 2007, a small supplement (Mad Bomber) was given out.

In 2008, the game received a second edition. It was published in English by Z-Man Games, with an expanded board and improved components; this edition includes the Mad Bomber and Mercenary tiles. Spanish, Italian, German and Dutch editions were released in 2010. A French translation was released February 2008.

Numerous expansions for the game have been published, including:

- Babel 13, in 2008
- Duel, in 2009
- Steel Police, in 2012

There are also several fan made expansions. Additional materials in multiple languages (inc. English-language translations of the expansions) are available at the relevant games articles at BoardGameGeek.

On 17 September 2010, the iOS version of the game was published on App Store, with an Android version following on 13 June 2012.

The game received a third edition in 2013.

== List of all available armies ==
There are four base game armies:

- Moloch
- Outpost
- Hegemony
- Borgo

As well as 18 official expansions:

- Neojungle [2012, previously published as part of "Babel 13"]
- Dancer [2012]
- New York [2012, previously published as part of "Babel 13"]
- Steel Police [2012]
- Sharrash [2013]
- Mephisto [2013]
- Doomsday Machine [2013] which is only released army banned on tournaments
- Mississippi [2014]
- Vegas [2014, previously published as part of "Duell"]
- Smart [2014, previously published as part of "Duell"]
- Uranopolis [2015]
- Death Breath [2016]
- Iron Gang [2017]
- Sand Runners [2019]
- Tryglodytes [2020]
- Beasts [2021]
- Pirates [2022]
- Merchant Guilds [2023]
- Desert Tribes [2024]
- Wiremen [2025]

== Reception ==
In Issue 23 of the Russian games magazine Страна игр (Games Country), Aleksandr Tishkovskiy visited the Portal game booth at Essen Game Fair 2009 and reported "This is a tactical game with original mechanics. Events unfold in the future, which is, as always, hopeless. Four factions are fighting for survival, only one will succeed." Tishkovskiy noted that there were two stand-alone expansions for the game and was grateful that "it is not at all necessary to have the basic version to play. Buy a small, inexpensive add-on, and then decide whether it's worth shelling out for the original box or not. Well, for fans of the series, this is generally a long-awaited gift."

The staff of the Hungarian magazine GameStar voted Neuroshima Hex! one of its Top 10 favorite board games of 2012.

In 2008 the second edition of the game was reviewed for the Polish board game magazine Rebel Times by Marcin Zawiślak. He noted that this edition was designed for international market, and so the component quality as well as components visual design have significantly improved since the first edition. The reviewer further noted that despite improvements to the first edition, the game components seem underwhelming, visually, to the higher quality art style seen in the Neuroshima role-playing game. He said that the game is well designed both from the mechanical and the thematical perspective, giving the game 7/10 score in execution and price, and 9/10 in the coolness factor. In 2014 the third edition of the game was reviewed for the same magazine by Piotr Żuchowski, who called it "the return of the Polish board game legend", noting that the game has for many years been Portal's (and arguably Polish) most highly ranked game internationally (based on review rankings in the BoardGameGeek website). The reviewer noted that the game has seen further improvements on the quality of design, which helps it keep up with the times and increasing quality and visual appeal of modern board games. However, they said that some may consider the new game components "too busy" and less clear compared to the more simplistic art style of the prior two editions, nothing that it is hard to please everyone, given that the prior editions were criticized for too little visual appeal. He also noted that the game rules were further refined, reducing randomness and increasing multiplayer appeal. Overall he praised the third edition for higher components quality and improved rules compared to the older versions.

Other reviews:

- Rebel Times #10

== Awards ==
- 2007 Gra Roku (Game of the Year) Players' Choice Award

== See also ==
- This War of Mine: The Board Game, a subsequent game by Oracz
