= Javon Frazier =

American businessman

- Born: June 21, 1978 (age 48); Los Angeles, California
- Education: UC Berkeley, NYU Stern School of Business
- Occupation: Businessman
- Known for: Video games, Tabletop games, subscription boxes

Javon Frazier is an American businessman. He worked for Marvel Entertainment, Studio 71, and founded Maestro Media. He specializes in crowdfunding campaigns, and mainly, tabletop game development on Kickstarter.

== Early career ==
Frazier started off as a consultant for Universal Motown Records Group in 2004. Later, he was employed by Atlanta Records. At Atlanta Records, he worked on radio promotions, where he measured airplay and listened to radio stations. He transferred to Shaman Work Recording as a business development consultant the next year.

=== Work at Marvel Entertainment ===
Javon worked for Marvel Entertainment in business development for the studio’s publishing and theatrical divisions. He worked on the creation of the Marvel Cinematic Universe with Iron Man and The Incredible Hulk. He then worked in Marvel’s television arm as Marketing Director. Some of his contributions include: Avengers: Earth’s Mightiest Heroes, Iron Man: Armored Adventures and Super Hero Squad. Frazier also launched approximately 40 games for the firm. Some games include: Ultimate Marvel vs. Capcom 3, Marvel Puzzle Quest, Marvel Avengers Alliance, and Lego Marvel Super Heroes, which generated over $600 Million in sales.

=== Partnerships and affiliations ===
At Pasadena City College, Frazier was appointed as an adjunct marketing lecturer.

Frazier joined the Entrepreneur Organization's board of directors in 2021, where he worked for two years. Through Maestro Media, he raised over $6.7 million through crowdsourcing. As of 2022, Frazier is a member of YPO. He has a partnership with entertainment firm Asmodee and earned several licenses, including Sally Face.

== Recognition ==
In 2000, Frazier received the National Undergraduate Scholar Award from the University of California as well as the Chancellor's Community Service Award.

== Work at Maestro Media ==
Javon Frazier is the founder and CEO of Maestro Media.

=== Dr. Lupo ===
Frazier partnered with streamer and content creator, DrLupo, to develop a card game. The game is a role playing game in which players pretend to be content creators and streamers who compete to be the first to get 10 million subscribers.

=== The Binding of Isaac: Four Souls ===
In 2021, Maestro media partnered with Edmund McMillen to release Requiem, an expansion pack the card game; The Binding of Isaac; Four Souls. Maestro Media partnered with international consultant, All About Games, to distribute and localize Maestro Media’s projects, such as The Binding of Isaac: Four Souls Requiem. Frazier contacted McMillen to discuss and license for The Binding of Isaac, and met with McMillen and his wife to play the game. Frazier worked closely with McMillen to launch the new version, and had previously worked on Four Souls and Tapeworm.

=== Bridge Constructor ===
In 2022, Maestro media, announced a tabletop adaptation of physics-based puzzle game, Bridge Constructor. A Kickstarter was set to launch in September of 2022 for the actualization of the game.

=== Hello Kitty: Day at the Park ===
In 2023, Maestro Media announced a new tabletop game, based on the character, Hello Kitty, created by Japanese designer, Yuko Shimizu. The game is set to be released in 2024.
