= BTS Meal =

McDonald's meal in partnership with BTS

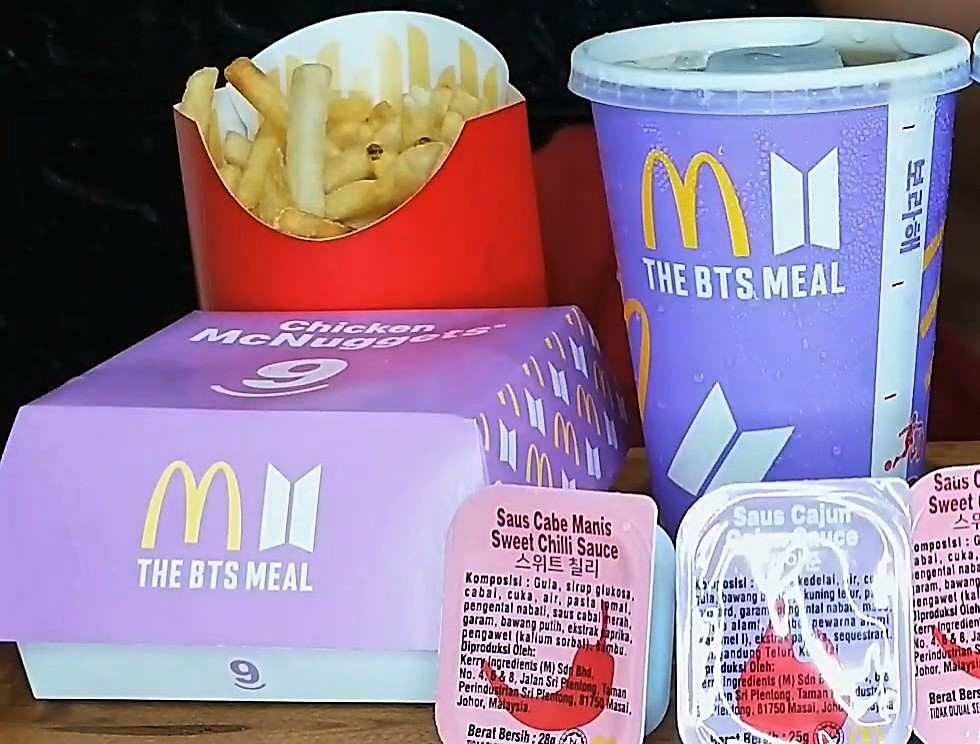
A BTS meal as served in Indonesia

The BTS Meal was a meal sold by the international fast food chain McDonald's in collaboration with the South Korean boy band BTS. Consisting of Chicken McNuggets, medium French fries, a medium Coca-Cola, and two spicy dipping sauces (Sweet Chili and Cajun), the BTS Meal was sold from May 26, 2021, to June 20, 2021, in select countries and eventually reached a total of fifty countries.

== Product description ==
The BTS Meal consists of a 10- or 9-piece Chicken McNuggets, medium french fries, a medium Coca-Cola, and Sweet Chili and Cajun dipping sauces inspired by "popular McDonald's South Korean recipes".

== History ==
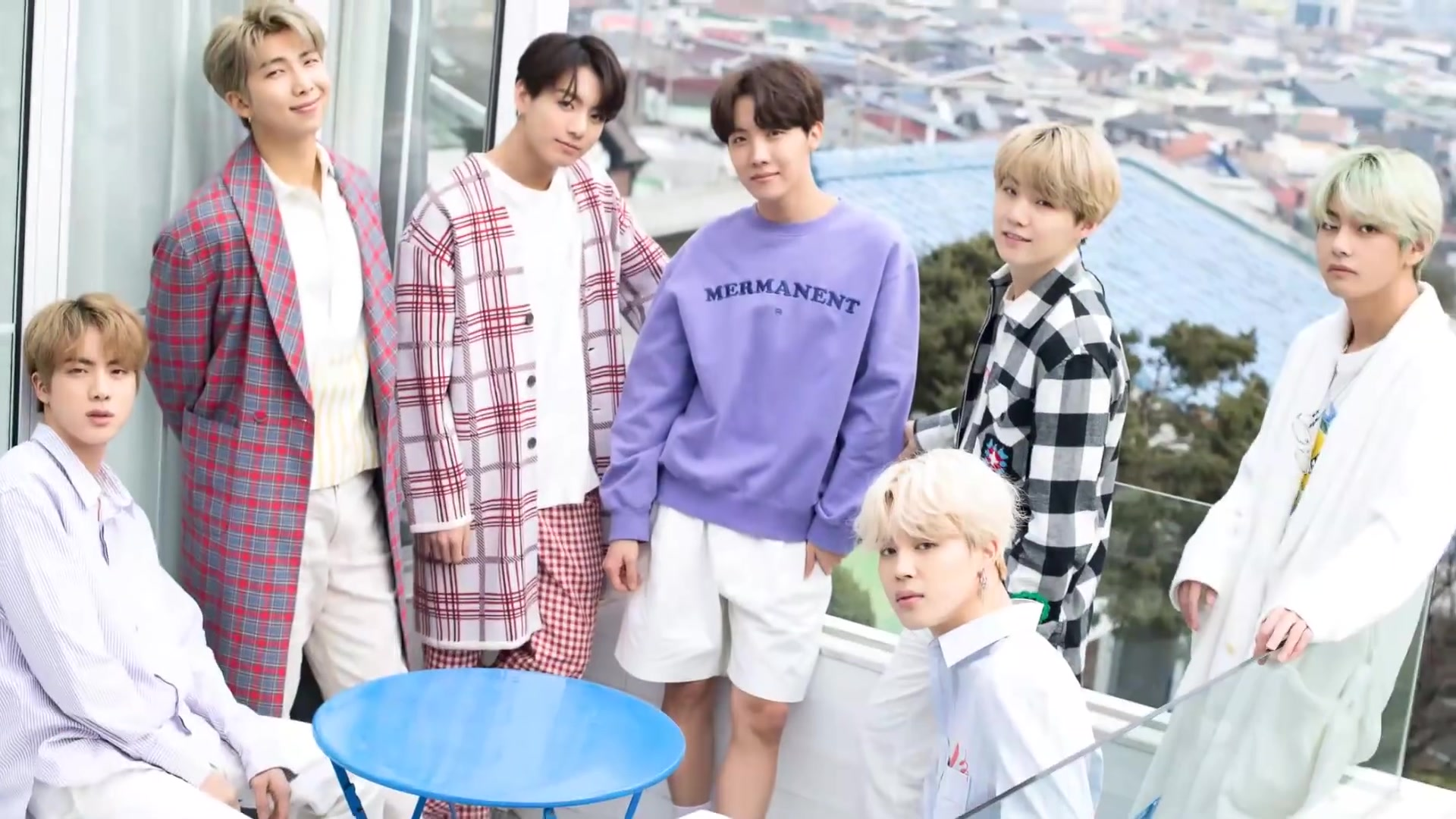
South Korean boy band BTS

A representative from the band's agency, Big Hit Entertainment, announced the collaboration between BTS and McDonald's through an official statement. Fans could purchase a meal coupon through a food ordering service prior to the official release.

Depending on the countries and location, the BTS Meal was available via dine-in, take-out, drive-through, and app-based orders, and it was only available during regular hours. The collaboration was the third collaboration for McDonald's. The BTS Meal was first released on May 26, 2021, in select countries, including: the United States, Austria, the Bahamas, Brazil, Canada, Colombia, the Dominican Republic, Indonesia, Israel, Malaysia, Paraguay, the Philippines, Taiwan, Romania and Sint Maarten. By late June, the meal had been released in fifty countries. Amidst the COVID-19 pandemic, massive crowds in Indonesia reportedly forced the temporary closure of many outlets, whereas in Singapore, the meal could only be ordered via delivery to prevent crowding at outlets due to the pandemic. Upon its release, the BTS-inspired packaging that the meal was served in was listed for resale on several e-commerce platforms, including Carousell. The promotion was discontinued on June 20, 2021.

== Availability dates ==
Dates and countries adapted from ABS-CBN News.

- May 26 – United States, Austria, Bahamas, Brazil, Canada, Colombia, Dominican Republic, Israel, Malaysia, Paraguay, St. Maarten, Ukraine
- May 27 – Australia, Belarus, Bulgaria, Croatia, Greece, Hungary, Kazakhstan, Oman, Singapore, South Korea, Vietnam
- May 28 – Malta, Puerto Rico
- June 1 – Costa Rica, India (Delhi), Mexico, Panama, United Arab Emirates
- June 2 – Bahrain, Cyprus, Qatar
- June 3 – Hong Kong, Macau
- June 4 – India (Mumbai)
- June 5 – Morocco
- June 7 – Estonia, Latvia, Lithuania
- June 9 – Taiwan
- June 11 – Romania
- June 15 – El Salvador, Guatemala, Honduras, Nicaragua, Suriname
- June 18 – Philippines
- June 25 – Indonesia

== Reception ==
Writing for the Chicago Tribune, Louisa Chu found the dipping sauces "smooth, but unsurprising". Rebecca Alter of Vulture praised McDonald's business acumen, while stating that the collaboration "made me optimistic for the future of musician promos at chains". William Mullally of Esquire Middle East described the Cajun dipping sauce as "the stuff of fast food greatness".

In 2021, the release reached over a million sales in South Korea, and caused an increase in sales, according to McDonald's.

== See also ==
- List of McDonald's products
- Among Us chicken nugget
