= Neuroshima =

Polish tabletop role-playing game

- Cover of Neuroshima Edition 1.5
- Designers: Ignacy Trzewiczek, Marcin Blacha, Michał Oracz and Marcin Baryłka
- Publishers: Wydawnictwo Portal (Portal Publishing House)
- Publication: 2003
- Genres: Post-apocalyptic science fiction, science fiction western, military science fiction
- Systems: 3d20 system
- The rulebook is offered both in paperback and hardcover (currently out of print), and there have been limited deluxe editions, signed by the authors.

Neuroshima is a Polish tabletop roleplaying system inspired by such films and games as Mad Max, Fallout, The Matrix, Terminator and Deadlands: Hell on Earth. It is currently available only in Polish. The game's motto is "never trust the machines". Its designers include Michal Oracz and Ignacy Trzewiczek.

== Setting ==
The game describes the United States in the mid-21st century, after a nuclear war started by a cybernetic revolt, which molded the continent into a barren wasteland. It seems that the reason for the war to break out was a sentient Artificial Intelligence commonly referred to as Moloch and made up of interconnected net of military computers: automated factories, military facilities, power plants and alike, that now cover the whole north of the U.S., from Oregon to the Great Lakes. On the south, there is another creation, called the Neojungle, that poses a threat to those who survived the war. It is a semi-intelligent carnivorous vegetation that grows very quickly, advancing north from Latin America. Right in the middle, there are humans. They are surrounded by mutant creatures, some bred by Moloch and hostile towards humans, and some simply animals and humans misshapen by nuclear fallout. On top of that there are Moloch's deadly machines lurking to complete the picture. But what is stressed in the book is that the worst enemy of humans is within them: hatred, indifference, greed.

=== Landscapes of Neuroshima ===
Car wrecks, ruined towns and villages, collapsed roofs on deserted houses, broken glass in the windows of abandoned gas stations fill the landscape of the United States of the middle of the 21st century. Technology is history - cars will not start, radios are jammed, no electricity whatsoever almost everywhere the characters go. Shops and malls are looted, prosperous villages are burned by gangers, and safe places are very sparse.

=== People in Neuroshima ===
No one knows how many people survived the war with machines, but it is estimated that their number oscillates around 2-3 million. Some people reverted to nomadic lifestyles and live in the deserts, some of them try to build the civilisation anew in devastated cities, some of them form gangs of highwaymen (called gangers), some of them just try to make a living by growing crops, and finally, there are those who just wander around the wasteland; the adventuring sort here is mostly represented by player characters. Each village they visit in this world is a discrete microcosm and nothing is certain as whether the inhabitants are welcoming or shoot strangers on sight. The continent is full of small, anonymous settlements, but there are places which aspire to become post-nuclear states.

=== Places in Neuroshima ===
In this world it is very important where you come from, and that is because people are prejudiced and afraid of strangers. Different places produce different kinds of people, and who you are is determined by where you are from.

Examples:

- The Southern Hegemony - (commonly referred to as 'the Hegemony') - located in what was once Arizona, New Mexico and partially Texas. A place where brute force determines one's place in the society. Dominated by gangs and unhampered by Moloch, the Hegemony is a threat to neighbouring lands.
- Vegas - the only well-lit city in the post-apocalyptic world. Home to many playhouses and casinos, it attracts people from every part of the country.
- Mother Desert - if you were born in the desert, whenever you go away from civilisation, you feel at home. Many Native Americans still live out there and are doing fine - after all the warheads did not hit the deserts.
- Detroit - known for some of the best drivers and racers in the post-nuclear US. Home of many gangs, such as The Shultz (mafia styled), Hurons (punkers), The League (racers), Parker Lots (gothic assassins) and the Gas Drinkers (mutant barbarians).
- New York - a place which has established a strong government and would like to rebuild America. They maintain schools, factories and railways and send soldiers to fight Moloch. Surprisingly enough, they sometimes succeed.
- Texas - the healthiest place in America. Actually, the only place where one can find green vegetation. Modern Texans still grow crops, breed horses and herd cattle, like their ancestors in the 19th century did.
- The Appalachian Federation - a place ruled by feudal lords. They have a social class system, in which people are divided into nobility and peasantry. Thanks to its iron and coal deposits, it's one of the richest places in the post-nuclear U.S.
- The Outpost - A mobile settlement run by scientists who aim to destroy Moloch. In coalition with New York, they manage an army, which is yet to stop Moloch's advance south. They steal technology from the machines they destroy and apply it to their own advantage.

== System ==
The game uses its own, custom system of rules. The dice you use is d20. This system does not have an official name, but it is unconnected to the d20 system, as it typically uses three twenty-sided dice.

=== Four colours ===
Neuroshima relies on the division of the gameplay into something the authors called Four Colours, namely steel, chrome, rust and mercury. The choice of a particular colour is made by the gamemaster (the decision can be consulted with the players in order to enhance the game experience) and determines the mood, atmosphere and the type of events/characters present in the story. The name of the colour itself implies the kind of gameplay it will symbolise. These colours are:

- Steel - this kind of gameplay is characterised by a slightly optimistic attitude towards the world. The aim is to raise the spirit of the characters by showing them that the war with the machines that is going on may be a difficult one, but it is not unwinnable, and that humans, when strong and united, can build the world anew. Example of a story: a unit of soldiers dispatched from the Outpost is sent to build a bunker and establish a relay base far in the north in order to plan a counter-tactic against Moloch's advance south.
- Chromium - is characterised by a hedonistic attitude. The characters are supposed to enjoy anything that is left from the world after the war and the story is supposed to allow them to do that. Example: the characters are offered a well-paid job by a local ganger boss who extorts wares from local tradesmen. Their job is to drive around the county and pick up the extorted items and trade it for drugs.
- Rust - a depressing, pessimistic mood. The characters will encounter rust, dilapidation and ruin everywhere they go. All the elements and NPCs of a story played in this mood are supposed to put the characters down and destroy their spirit. Example: the characters, badly wounded after a gunfight and robbed of all their possession find refuge in a village which is constantly raided by gangers. The characters' quest is to repel those attacks, but the enemies outnumber them and are well equipped, whereas the characters have nothing to fight with.
- Mercury (Quicksilver) - the most depressing side of the game; usually stories played in this mood end with the death of all the characters. The aim of this mood is to show that any kind of action undertaken is futile and that the war is already over, hence all the people are already dead, which is a fact they just need to realise. Example: a group of soldiers stationed in a bunker is awaiting an attack by mutants. They are well-armed and trained, but there is a mistake in the intelligence they were given and they do not know yet that they are seriously outnumbered. The attack commences at dusk and it is already too late to retreat, so the characters decide to seal off the bunker, hopeful that the mutants will not be able to get inside and simply go away. The mutants attack the bunker with chemical weapons instead. The characters do not have enough gas masks to go around. As an effect, those strong enough will kill the weaker ones to get their masks, not knowing that the mutants will blow up the sealed entrance the following morning.

== Official rulebooks and sourcebooks ==
Original (1.0) edition of Neuroshima cover

The current edition is 1.5 . Since the release of the game in 2003, sourcebooks have been appearing. The game keeps growing bigger with every add-on, as well as the storyline, which is updated in those sourcebooks and in Space Pirate (pl. Gwiezdny Pirat) magazine, also published by Portal.

A new edition called Neuroshima: Last Era (Neuroshima: Ostatnia Era) was published in 2026 by Dark Rabbit.

=== List of released rulebooks and sourcebooks ===
Detroit sourcebook cover

- Neuroshima 1.0 - the original edition of the core rulebook (out of print).
- Neuroshima 1.5 - enhanced and revised core rulebook, with new material added and some material cut out.
- Wyścig (The Race) - sourcebook dedicated to cars and racing; contains rules concerning building your own vehicle and new character classes connected with driving.
- Gladiator - sourcebook describing in detail the "Gladiator" character class.
- Supplement (Supplement) - sourcebook revising the core rulebook.
- Detroit - sourcebook describing the city of Detroit, its inhabitants and its customs in 2050.
- Krew i rdza (Blood and Rust) - a set of concepts and sketches of adventures.
- Zabić szczura (Kill the Rat) - the first mini-campaign.
- Bohater^{2} (Hero^{2}) - sourcebook adding new rules and options for character creation.
- Miami - sourcebook describing the city of Miami, its inhabitants and customs in detail.
- Zaginione Miasto (The Lost City) - the second mini-campaign.
- Piraci (Pirates) - sourcebook about ships and marine combat; it also describes the Caribbean Islands of 2050.
- Bohater^{3} (Hero^{3}) - another sourcebook adding yet new rules and options for character creation.
- Łowca Mutantów / Zabójca Maszyn (Mutant Hunter / Bot Slayer) - double sourcebook describing in detail the Mutant Hunter and Bot Slayer classes.
- Bestiariusz: Maszyny (Bestiary: Machines) - sourcebook describing more than 60 machines in detail.
- Mistrz Gry^{2} (Gamemaster^{2}) - sourcebook filled with descriptions of NPCs, villages, new enemies (Dead-Breath zombies, and the IV generation Mutants) and a "hit your players" guide, showing possible actions a gamemaster can do when the players become overconfident or "too" powerful.
- Bestiariusz: Bestie (Bestiary: Beasts) - sourcebook describing 53 creatures that can be met in various environments in detail.
- Ruiny (Ruins) - sourcebook about scavenging though ruins and loot that can be found.
- Krew i rdza 2 (Blood and Rust 2) - Another set of concepts and sketches of adventures including new character classes, mechanics and adventures.
- Prawo i sprawiedliwość (Law and justice) - sourcebook resolving about concept of playing a various types of law enforces with special rules of character creation and examples of post-war law forms.
- Nowy Jork (New York) - sourcebook describing the city of New York, its inhabitants and its customs in 2050.
- Skażenia (Contaminations) - sourcebook describing various poisons and toxins appearing in the game and ways of protecting against them.
- Bohater: Maxx (Hero: Maxx) - another sourcebook adding yet new rules and options for character creation.

== See also ==
- Neuroshima Apocalypse
- Neuroshima Hex!
- Neuroshima Tactics
- Monastyr
