= Sally Face =

2016 video game

- Developer: Portable Moose
- Publisher: Portable Moose
- Engine: Unity
- Platforms: Windows, macOS, Linux, Nintendo Switch, PlayStation 4, Xbox One, Android, iOS
- Release: Windows, macOS, Linux; August 16, 2016; Switch; January 21, 2021; PS4, Xbox One; April 15, 2022; Android, iOS; August 16, 2026
- Genres: Adventure, puzzle
- Mode: Single-player

Sally Face is a 2016 horror adventure game developed by Steve Gabry under the name Portable Moose. The game follows Sal Fisher (otherwise known as Sally Face), a boy with a prosthetic face, who investigates local murders and paranormal events with his friends. The game consists of five episodes that were released from 2016 to 2019.

Sally Face was also released for Nintendo Switch in 2021 and for PlayStation 4 and Xbox One in 2022. In 2026, the game received ports for iOS and Android.

== Gameplay ==
Sally Face is a point-and-click adventure game with a side-scrolling perspective. The player primarily follows Sal as he explores environments, solves puzzles and progresses the narrative. However, at certain points other characters are controllable.

Sal is able to use a handheld game system called Gear Boy to communicate with the dead. This mechanic allows him to gather information and investigate mysteries. The protagonist can also talk to non-playable characters (NPCs), as well as interact with objects. Players are encouraged to look for hidden details and solve optional puzzles so that they can unlock more of the story. They can also return to previously explored places and see how things have changed.

The game also includes various minigames that break up the regular gameplay.

== Plot ==
=== Episode 1: Strange Neighbors ===
In 1984, 7-year-old Sal Fisher wakes up in a sterile hospital room, his face wrapped in bandages. As he gets up to explore, the atmosphere quickly turns eerie. The room appears normal at first, but as Sal moves through the hospital corridors, things begin to change. Blood splatters the walls, the lights flicker, and strange whispers echo around him. As he navigates this dreamlike sequence, he encounters a dog, who cryptically tells him that he is not alone. After the eerie dream sequence, a now 15-year-old Sal with a prosthetic face wakes up in reality, revealing that he and his father have moved from New Jersey to the Addison Apartments building in the town of Nockfell. The day before their arrival in 1992, one of the other residents, Mrs. Sanderson, is murdered. Sal explores and meets the other tenants, including Larry Johnson, who reveals he witnessed the murder. Sal helps Larry find evidence that the murderer was Charley Mansfield, one of the other tenants. They present the evidence to the police, and he is arrested. In the present, Sal recounts the story to his psychiatrist, Dr. Enon, as he is awaiting trial for mass murder.

=== Episode 2: The Wretched ===
The episode begins in 1993, with Sal experiencing another disturbing dream, hinting at his traumatic past and a growing supernatural presence around him. When he wakes up, Larry tells him that he has been hearing strange noises in the basement of the apartment complex. Believing it could be linked to the murder from the previous episode, the two decide to investigate further. Larry tells Sal that he feels a demon has cursed him in the building. They both uncover hidden areas within the basement, including a room filled with strange symbols, dark rituals, and an ominous presence that suggests the building is haunted by something much worse than just ghosts. As they dig deeper, Sal experiences terrifying visions of a demonic figure, hinting at a greater evil tied to the apartments. Sal promises to help him and goes to Todd Morrison, a tenant their age who creates gadgets. Todd modifies Sal's "Gear Boy" into the "Super Gear Boy" to be able to detect supernatural spots. Together, the three of them explore the building. On the top floor, which is under renovation, Sal enters a secret room, where he encounters the demon. Larry steps in to save Sal and eliminates the demon with a gadget made by Todd. In the present, Sal is taken away while Enon visits the treehouse, where he is scared by the ghost of Larry and is killed after he falls from the tree, breaking his neck.

=== Episode 3: The Bologna Incident ===
The episode starts off more than a year later in 1994, with Sal and his friends at school in the cafeteria, where they suspect something is terribly wrong with the cafeteria's bologna. Students have been eating it for years, but no one seems to know where it actually comes from. The strange taste and its suspicious origins lead the group to investigate. After discovering that it is produced by the math teacher Mrs. Packerton, who lives in Addison Apartments, Sal and Larry decide to break into her apartment. There, they find that the bologna is made of human meat and that Mrs. Packerton's husband is possessed by an unknown entity. The duo euthanizes him. Their friend Ashley Campbell discovers a hidden trash chute but falls down it. Sal, Larry, and Todd find that the chute leads to an occult temple underneath the building, where they save Ashley. Mrs. Packerton is killed in a car crash.

=== Episode 4: The Trial ===
Five years later in 1999, a now-adult Sal lives with Todd and Todd's boyfriend, Neil, in a house down the road from Addison Apartments, where they have spent the last few years investigating the cult. Ashley comes to visit, and she and Sal meet at a lake. That night, Sal receives strange messages from Larry and rushes to the apartments, only to find that Larry has purposely overdosed. Sal and Larry's ghost work their way through the apartment building, where it is shown in the otherworld that all the residents are overgrown with a strange growth. When Sal reaches Terrence Addison, the owner of the building who never leaves his room, he finds that a fleshy green mass has possessed him since he was a child. Sal defeats the mass, but an apparition of Terrence tells him he must kill all the infected tenants to end the infestation for good. Reluctantly, Sal obliges and murders all of the residents. In the lobby, he finds Todd, who has been possessed by the demon. Todd calls Ashley, crying and hysterical, and she calls the authorities. She arrives shortly after the police and witnesses a blood-covered Sal, muttering and regretful. Sal is arrested immediately.

Two years later, in 2001, Sal is put on trial and, due to the cult controlling the jury and Dr. Enon being replaced by a cult lookalike, he is sentenced to death. Although Ashley later finds proof of Sal's story in the form of a picture of Larry's ghost, she arrives too late to save Sal, witnessing his execution by electric chair.

=== Episode 5: Memories and Dreams ===
After Sal's death, Ashley continues Todd's investigations of the cult. She places explosives, with the help of Neil and his friend in the army, in the main cult temple. However, she is unable to bring herself to detonate them. Believing Sal is destined to destroy the cult, she initiates a ritual to revive him and slits her wrist to become a physical host for his spirit. This temporarily keeps Sal alive and gives her special abilities. They go to the temple, where Ashley, Sal's spirit, and the ghost of Larry defeat "The Endless One", the core entity of the cult, saving Todd and others from the cult's possession. Larry's ghost vanishes, leaving the others to grieve him. Even after the group's best efforts to save the world from the cult, it is later revealed in the unlockable epilogue that though they managed to save the world, 33% of the planet's population had been consumed by the darkness.

== Development ==
Release timeline
2016	Episode One: Strange Neighbors
2017	Episode Two: The Wretched
2018	Episode Three: The Bologna Incident
2018	Episode Four: The Trial
2019	Episode Five: Memories and Dreams

Sally Face was made by solo developer Steve Gabry, who also composed the soundtracks, under the name Portable Moose. The game was developed using the Unity game engine over the course of five years.

Gabry first invented the concept and world of Sally Face around 2006 or 2007. He originally planned to make it an internet cartoon series, but eventually changed it to a five-episode game narrative. Gabry started working on the game in 2015, with the first chapter being developed in his free time while he was holding a full-time job and still working with his indie game team, Wither Studios.

The developer mentioned 1990s cartoons, such as Doug and Hey Arnold!, and personal nightmares as his inspirations. In 2016, a crowdfunding campaign raised over $13,000, allowing Gabry to start working on Sally Face full-time. "Episode One: Strange Neighbors" was released August 16, 2016, on itch.io and December 14 on Steam. "Episode Two: The Wretched" was released July 7, 2017. "Episode Three: The Bologna Incident" was released on February 10, 2018. "Episode Four: The Trial" was released on November 30, 2018. "Episode Five: Memories and Dreams" was the final episode and was released on December 13, 2019.

The game was released for Nintendo Switch on January 21, 2021. On April 15, 2022, it became available for PlayStation 4 and Xbox One. Sally Face received mobile ports for Android and iOS on August 16, 2026.

== Reception ==
In a review of "Episode Two: The Wretched", Nerdvana called it "a psychological horror masterpiece" that evoked strong emotions.

Adventure Gamers' Will Aickman highlighted the game's creativeness, describing it as a "world where truly anything can happen". He praised the art style and soundtrack, arguing they were fitting for the tone of the game, as well as the changing gameplay. Aickman enjoyed searching for secrets, while worrying about possibly missing important plot details. The reviewer was critical of the last act, with a fast pace that he felt was hard to follow, along with certain puzzle solutions, which he considered "overly obscure". Finally, he mentioned how acts of extreme violence are committed throughout the story and the writing excused them too readily.

=== Awards ===
Year	Award	Category	Result	Ref.
2017	Let's Play PA	Indie Digital	Finalist	
2017	IndieDB Indie of the Year	Released games	Top 100 selection	
2018	IndieDB Indie of the Year	Players' Choice	Won	

== Sequel ==
On August 16, 2026, the ten-year anniversary of the first episode's release, Portable Moose uploaded a teaser for Sally Face 2.
