= 3d20 system =

Role-playing game system

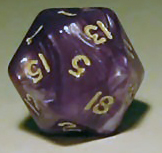
A typical twenty-sided die

The 3d20 system is the role-playing game system used in Neuroshima and Monastyr. Like the d20 System, it uses twenty-sided dice, but unlike that system it most typically uses three.

== Core mechanic ==
1. Name the skill to be tested and the difficulty level
2. Roll three 20-sided dice
3. Compare all three separate results with the given attribute
4. If at least two of the three results are lower than the attribute modified by the difficulty level, the test is successful.

== Details ==
When a test is required, the Gamemaster, names the skill which is going to be tested (or a raw attribute, if no skill is available for the activity the character is trying to perform). He also sets a difficulty level for the test, which modifies the attribute value (reducing or improving it). Then, the character's skill level is taken into account - if the character does not have any skill levels in the given skill, (in case of Neuroshima) the difficulty level is raised by one, or (in case of Monastyr), all the three rolls (not two) have to be lower than the tested attribute. Otherwise, the player can subtract a total of his character's skill levels in that skill from any of the three dice rolls, each separately.

=== Difficulty levels ===
Difficulty level	Attribute modifier	Difficulty level	Attribute modifier	Difficulty level	Attribute modifier
Easy	+ 2	Problematic	2	Very difficult	8
Average	0	Difficult	5	Extremely difficult	11

=== Special rules ===
- Suwak ("Slider") is a special rule of this game system. It says that when a character has at least four 4 levels in a skill, each time that skill is tested, the difficulty level is automatically lowered by one; if their skill level is 8 or 12, then difficulty is lowered by two or three levels respectively. It's supposed to depict the fact that the more trained a character becomes, the easier those things they trained seem to them.
- Lucky 1 - each time when making a test roll a player rolls "1" on any dice, he is lucky and manages to perform easily; in the terms of mechanics, the test is treated as if the difficulty level was lower by one. Notice: if the player rolls two "1's", the test is automatically successful.
