= Secret Hitler =

2016 social deduction party game

- Manufacturers: Breaking Games
- Designers: Max Temkin; Mike Boxleiter; Tommy Maranges
- Illustrators: Mackenzie Schubert
- Publishers: Goat, Wolf, & Cabbage
- Publication: August 25, 2016; 10 years ago
- Genres: Party game
- Languages: English
- Players: 5–10
- Playing time: 30–60 minutes
- Website: secrethitler.com

Secret Hitler is a hidden identity social deduction party game developed by Goat, Wolf, & Cabbage LLC, manufactured by Breaking Games and distributed by Blackbox. The board game was designed by Max Temkin, Mike Boxleiter and Tommy Maranges, with artwork created by Mackenzie Schubert, and first released on August 25, 2016. In Secret Hitler, players assume the roles of liberals and fascists in the Reichstag of the Weimar Republic, with one player becoming Hitler. To win the game, both parties are set to competitively enact liberal and fascist policies respectively, or complete a secondary objective directly tied to the Hitler role.

== Gameplay ==
Secret Hitler sees players divided into two teams: the liberals and the fascists, the latter also including the Hitler role. There are always more liberals than there are fascists in each game, but the fascists have the advantage of knowing the identities of each other. The liberals, with only the information of their personal affiliation, must therefore deduce, using social and mechanical means, for themselves which players to trust. When playing with five or six players, there are only two fascists, one of whom is Hitler; as there are only two fascists, Hitler knows who the other fascist is and vice versa. In games of seven or more players, the identity of Hitler is known to all other fascists, but the identities of the other fascists are unknown to Hitler.

At the start of each round, the player to the left of the previous President becomes the new President (the first President is chosen randomly). The President nominates another player to the Chancellorship, and every player, including the proposed government, votes either "Ja!" (yes) or "Nein" (no) to the proposal. The Chancellor candidate can neither be the current President nor the previously elected Government.

If more than half the players vote for the Chancellor candidate, that player is granted the office and becomes the new Chancellor. After each successful election, the President blindly takes three policy cards from the draw pile, each of which could be "liberal" or "fascist". The President then discards one of these cards and passes the other two to the Chancellor, who in turn selects which of these will be passed and enacted, ending the round; all discarded cards are placed face down. There are 6 liberal policy cards and 11 fascist policy cards in the draw pile at the start of the game. After the end of each round, the Presidential role is passed on to the player to the left.

If the election ends in a tie or more than half the players vote against the Chancellor candidate, the election is considered unsuccessful. Every time an election fails, the Election Tracker is counted up by one and the Presidential role is passed on, ending the round. Whenever three consecutive elections have failed, the policy from the top of the draw pile is enacted without oversight by the President or the Chancellor, after which the Election Tracker is reset. The Election Tracker is also reset when a new policy is enacted by the Chancellor.

While enacting a liberal policy will have no direct effect on the game, passing a fascist policy may grant the President special executive actions referred to as "Presidential Powers", including the ability to privately check the three top cards of the draw pile; investigate a player's party membership (but not their status as Hitler); choose the next round's President via special election (after this, the presidency rotates back to the person it would have gone to before if a special election was not triggered); or execute a player, removing that player from the game. These powers are activated by covering up a fascist policy tracker space that has an ability written in it, after which that power has to be resolved before ending the round. Fascist policies caused by the Election Tracker advancing to three consecutive, unsuccessful elections will not trigger any immediate Presidential Powers - though veto power will be activated for the rest of the game. Passing five fascist policies unlocks the ability to exercise the veto power for the rest of the game, where the Chancellor can choose to not enact any new policy on the President's consent. Whenever the veto power is used, the Election Tracker is counted up by one before the end of the round - if it is rejected, the Chancellor must pass policy as normal.

The game ends when either five liberal policies or six fascist policies have been enacted, resulting in victory for whichever team has achieved that policy count requirement. Additionally, after three fascist policies have been passed, the fascists can win by having Hitler elected Chancellor. Whenever the President is required to execute a player, the liberals can win by having Hitler executed. If the executed player is not Hitler, the game continues without the remaining players knowing whether that player was a liberal or a fascist. The game continues if Hitler is elected President, even after the three fascist policies have been enacted.

== Development and release ==
Secret Hitler was designed by Max Temkin (the co-creator of Cards Against Humanity and Humans vs. Zombies), Mike Boxleiter (co-founder of Mikengreg, the video game developer behind Solipskier and TouchTone) and Tommy Maranges (the writer of Philosophy Bro), and was illustrated by Mackenzie Schubert (illustrator of games such as Letter Tycoon and Penny Press), collectively known as Goat, Wolf, & Cabbage LLC. The development team worked out of office space provided by the Cards Against Humanity team for new game designers. The original concept was developed by Boxleiter and Maranges as means to re-engineer the gameplay of Avalon, with Temkin adding significant influence from Werewolf variations. On November 23, 2015, Temkin launched a Kickstarter campaign for the game seeking $54,450. The project was successfully funded by 200% within the first 24 hours, and the campaign ended on December 23, 2015, with a total of $1,479,046 pledged by 34,565 contributors, making it one of the most successful tabletop games in Kickstarter's history. Meanwhile, a freeware print-and-play edition of Secret Hitler was released on November 25, 2015, under the CC BY-NC-SA 4.0 Creative Commons license.

Secret Hitler first shipped for Kickstarter backers, in multiple waves starting on August 25, 2016, and was released to retail shortly after. The game is produced by Breaking Games, a division of Cards Against Humanity manufacturer AdMagic, and distributed by Blackbox, a shipping company founded by the creators of Cards Against Humanity, including Secret Hitler designer Temkin. An official, Wil Wheaton-narrated companion app, Secret Hitler Companion, was launched alongside Secret Hitler, for Android and iOS.

In February 2017, free copies of Secret Hitler were shipped to all 100 members of the United States Senate. The Trump Pack, an expansion pack for Secret Hitler, which replaces the fascists' cards with Donald Trump and prominent members of his administration at the time (Sean Spicer, Stephen Miller, Steve Bannon and Mike Pence), was released in June 2017, with all proceeds generated from the pack's sales donated to the American Civil Liberties Union.

== Reception ==
A board game review in The Wirecutter stated that the game, while fun, has a difficult learning curve because of its complex rules. It also stated it has a "potentially offensive theme".

Polygon praised the game as "a hit" with "pure shenanigans you'll enjoy round after round".

== See also ==
- This War of Mine: The Board Game
