= Monastyr (role-playing game) =

- Cover of Monastyr hardcover edition
- Designers: Ignacy Trzewiczek, Michał Oracz, Marcin Blacha
- Publishers: Wydawnictwo Portal (Portal Publishing House)
- Publication: 2004
- Genres: dark fantasy, cloak and dagger, Period Adventure (Age of Enlightenment)
- Systems: 3d20 system

Monastyr is a Polish role-playing game published in 2004. It is set in a dark fantasy world of Dominium. Its setting features a fantastic equivalent of the Age of Enlightenment. Most often, the game plots are cloak and dagger-like and involve plotting, intrigue, and struggle in the name of honor. The game has been inspired by such authors as Alexandre Dumas, père, Michael Moorcock and H. P. Lovecraft. It is published by the Polish company Wydawnictwo Portal (Portal Publishing House) and it is currently available only in Polish.

The game does not shy from dealing with serious issues such as religion or race. The players have to play humans, and they are all followers of a certain monotheistic religion, known as Karianism. The religion is based on Christian faith in one god mixed with reincarnation and the cycle of life known from Hinduism. The human countries, tied together with that religion, are involved in a long struggle against all other races (elves, dwarves, orcs, etc.), as Karianism dictates that all of those races are doomed beyond salvation, therefore must be exterminated as minions of evil god Kusiciel (Tempter). Magic is also considered a sign of a devil or demons, so there are no (overt) mage human characters.

The corebook, Monastyr, does not describe the lands of non-humans, instead, it concentrates on the human empire, which, while united by a single faith and church, is composed of over fifty autonomous countries, each involved in various struggles, political or military, against others.

Monastyr mechanics are based around the 3d20 system.

== Reviews ==
- Monastyr Spełnienie oczekiwań?, 9 May 2004, polter.pl
