= Development of Fez =

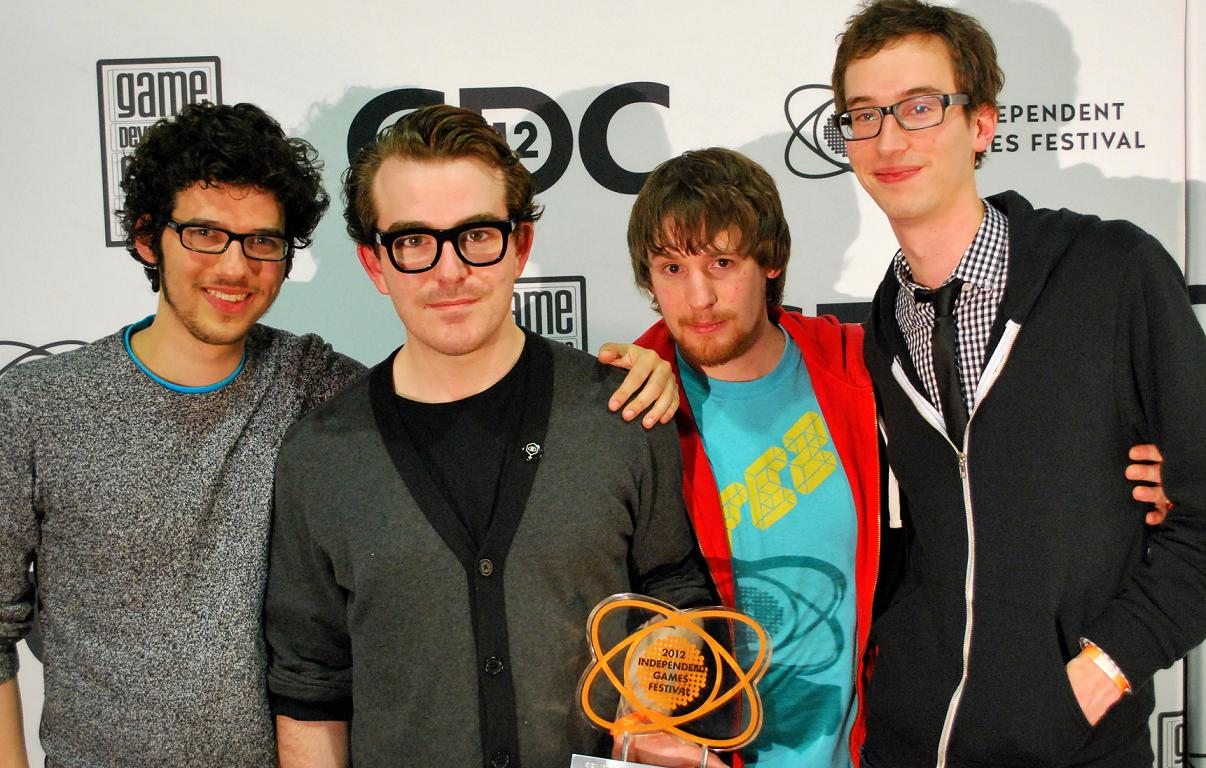
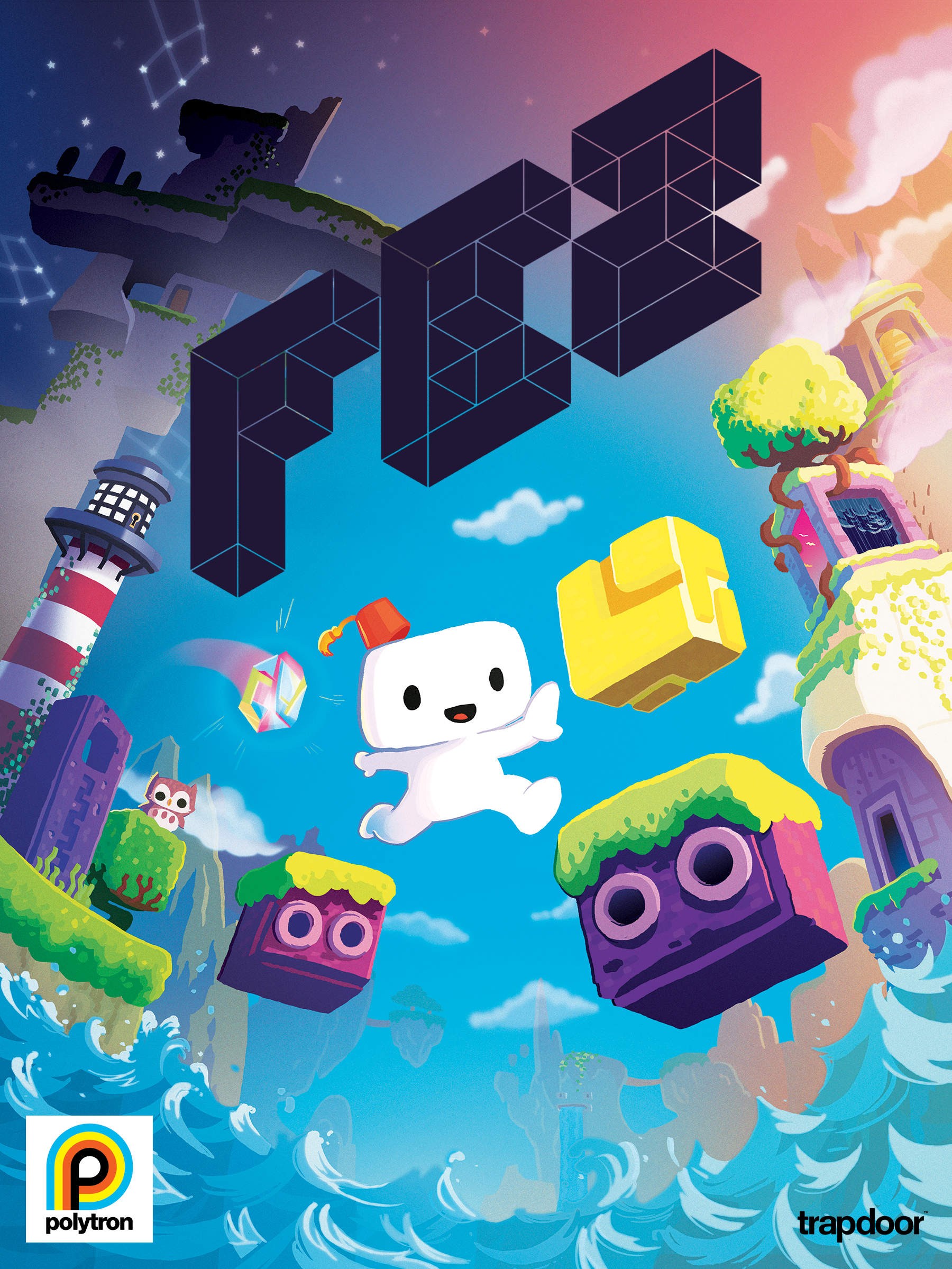
Fez development team at the 2012 GDC IGF (from left): composer Rich Vreeland, designer Phil Fish, sound designer Brandon McCartin, programmer Renaud Bédard

The high-profile and protracted five-year development of the video game Fez led to its status as an "underdog darling of the indie game scene". The 2012 puzzle-platform game built around rotating between four 2D views of a 3D space was developed by indie developer Polytron Corporation and published by Polytron, Trapdoor, and Microsoft Studios. Over the course of the game's development, Fez designer and Polytron founder Phil Fish received celebrity status for his outspoken public persona and prominence in the 2012 documentary Indie Game: The Movie, which followed the game's final stages of development and Polytron's related legal issues. The game was released to critical acclaim as an Xbox Live Arcade timed exclusive, and was later ported to other platforms. It had sold one million copies by the end of 2013.

Fish and Shawn McGrath collaborated on a puzzle game that became Fez. When McGrath left the project due to creative differences, Fish, the game's artist, pursued a platform game direction with Renaud Bédard, the game's programmer, who wrote the game's level editor and game engine from scratch. Levels were built in 3D by extruding surfaces with Photoshop-created textures. Bédard and Fish were joined by three different animators and other collaborators. The game was first announced in June 2007 and won an award at the 2008 Independent Games Festival and entered the public spotlight. Fish created a studio, Polytron Corporation, and was later aided by nearby developer-publisher Trapdoor when Polytron ran out of money. Fez won several more prerelease awards, including the 2012 Seumas McNally Grand Prize.

== History ==
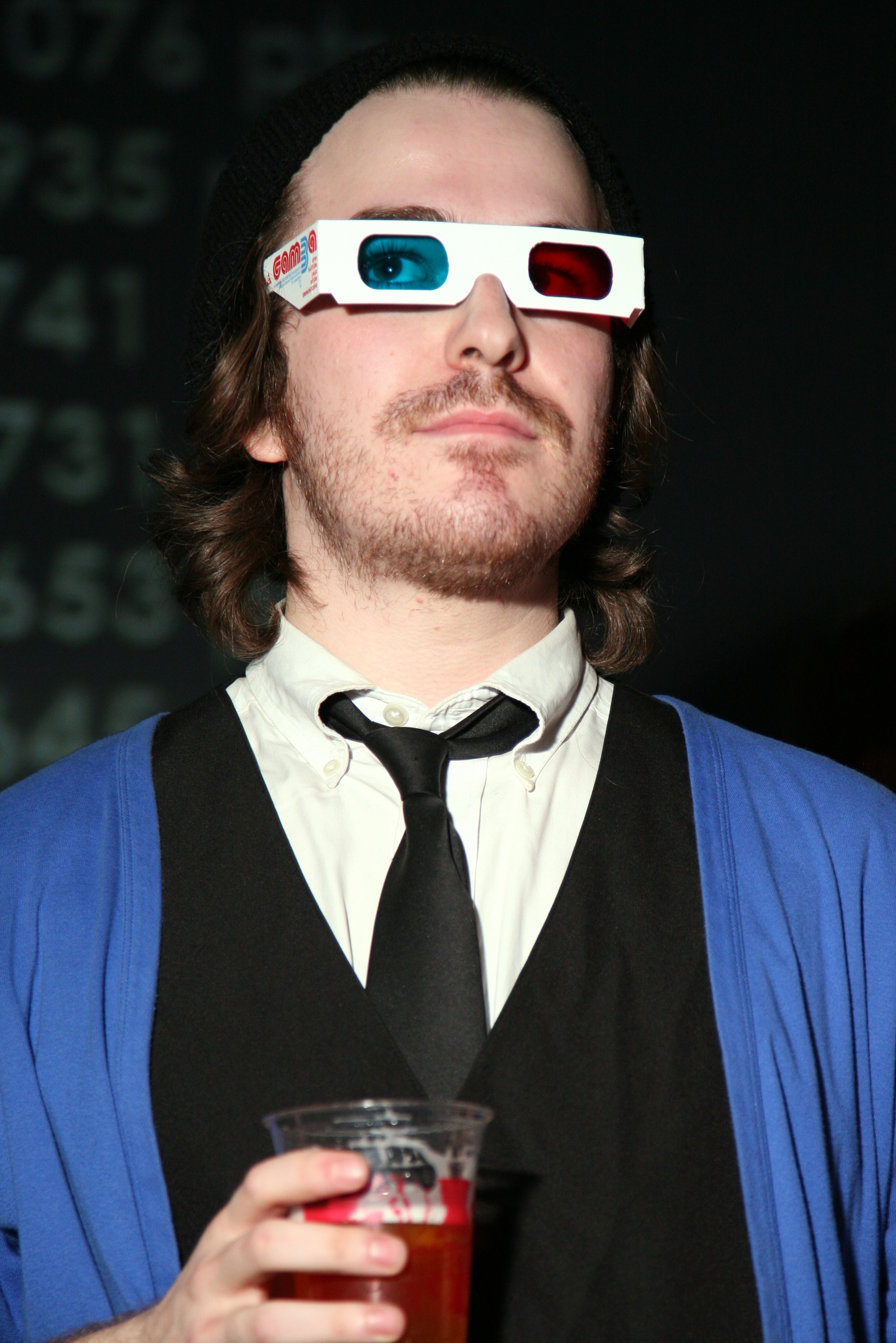
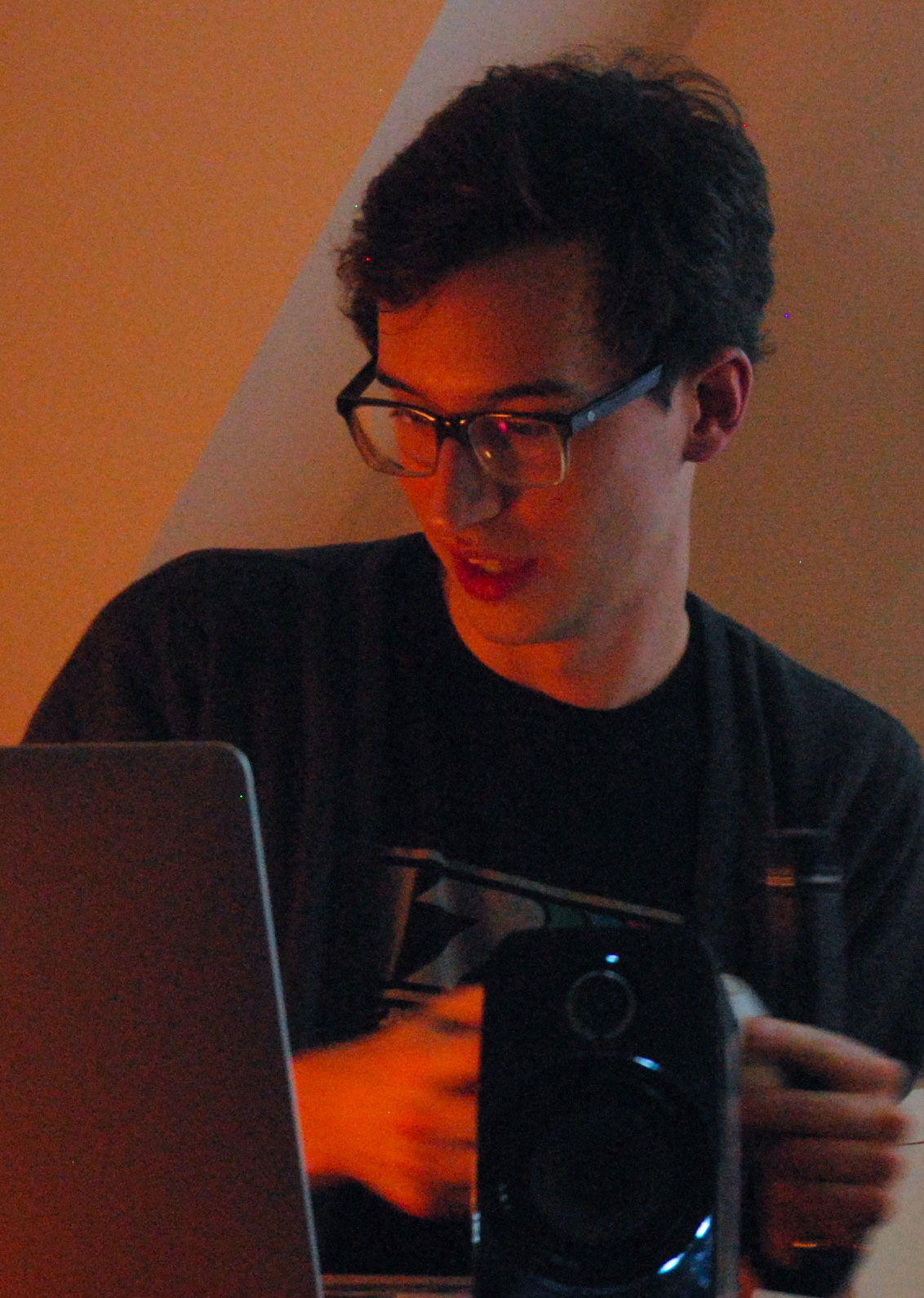
Fez designer Phil Fish and
programmer Renaud Bédard

Fez's development cycle developed a reputation for its protracted five-year length and public exposure. Nathan Grayson of VG247 likened the game's rocky development process to "an indie Duke Nukem Forever". Polygon reviewer Arthur Gies wrote that the game was an "underdog darling of the indie game scene" for four years prior to its release. The game's designer, Phil Fish, became renowned in a way unusual for game developers due to his prominence in Indie Game: The Movie, which released in 2012. While the game was released to wide acclaim, Fish himself became known for his outspoken and acerbic public persona.

The game that became Fez began in a collaboration between Montreal-based Phil Fish and Toronto-based Shawn McGrath on McGrath's idea for a puzzle game: a four-sided 3D space with each side in 2D, similar to Fish's 3D pixels (voxels) as incorporated into Fez. The entirety of Fez's design, lore, and art descends from this game mechanic. Fish provided the project's art and credited his influence to Shigeru Miyamoto and Hayao Miyazaki. Fish and McGrath's partnership crumbled due to creative differences, as Fish wanted to create a platform game. (Note: After the split, McGrath made Dyad with his new company, ][ (Right Square Bracket Left Square Bracket).) Fish continued to work on the game in his spare time and announced his search for a programmer on DeviantArt, and the first person to reply, Renaud Bédard, became lead programmer. They were both the same age and living in Montreal. Though Bédard had some hobbyist experience in 3D graphics and was studying computer science, Fez was his first professional game development project. (Note: Bédard graduated from Université du Québec à Montréal in 2008 with a degree in computer science.) His first task was to write the level editor and game engine.

Fez was first announced in July 2007 on The Independent Gaming Source. A trailer released in October 2007 convinced Jason DeGroot to join the development team as a producer. DeGroot, also known as "6955", first met Fish at a 2006 E3 party, and started work on the game's soundtrack and sound effects. (Note: DeGroot worked on Fez as far back as September 2007 and released demo tracks in late 2009, although he later left the project. Rich "Disasterpeace" Vreeland and Brandon McCartin were working on the game's audio in 2010. DeGroot later worked on games including Dyad (with Shawn McGrath) and Sound Shapes.) The soundtrack was ultimately composed by Rich "Disasterpeace" Vreeland and the sound effects by Brandon McCartin. The game was nominated for two awards at the 2008 Independent Games Festival (IGF) at the Game Developers Conference (GDC): Excellence in Visual Art and the Design Innovation Award. As Fez was a side project, Fish was employed full-time at Artificial Mind and Movement in Montreal, where he worked on a tie-in game for a film. He was not permitted time off to attend the event and thus decided to quit his job in January 2008—a moment he later marked as "when I became indie". The game won "Excellence in Visual Art", and created a surge of public interest in the game concurrent to a similar swell of interest in indie game developers. Fish received a Canadian government loan to open Polytron Corporation as a startup company and began full-time work on Fez. In July 2009, Polytron announced a release for Xbox Live Arcade in early 2010. Polytron and Microsoft agreed to release Fez as an Xbox exclusive, a deal Fish later recalled as sensible. Fish designed the game as "a console game, not a PC game", and felt that the way he intended the game to be experienced—with a controller on a couch—was "part of the medium". Polytron ruled out a WiiWare release due to problems Fish had with their platform and developer options.

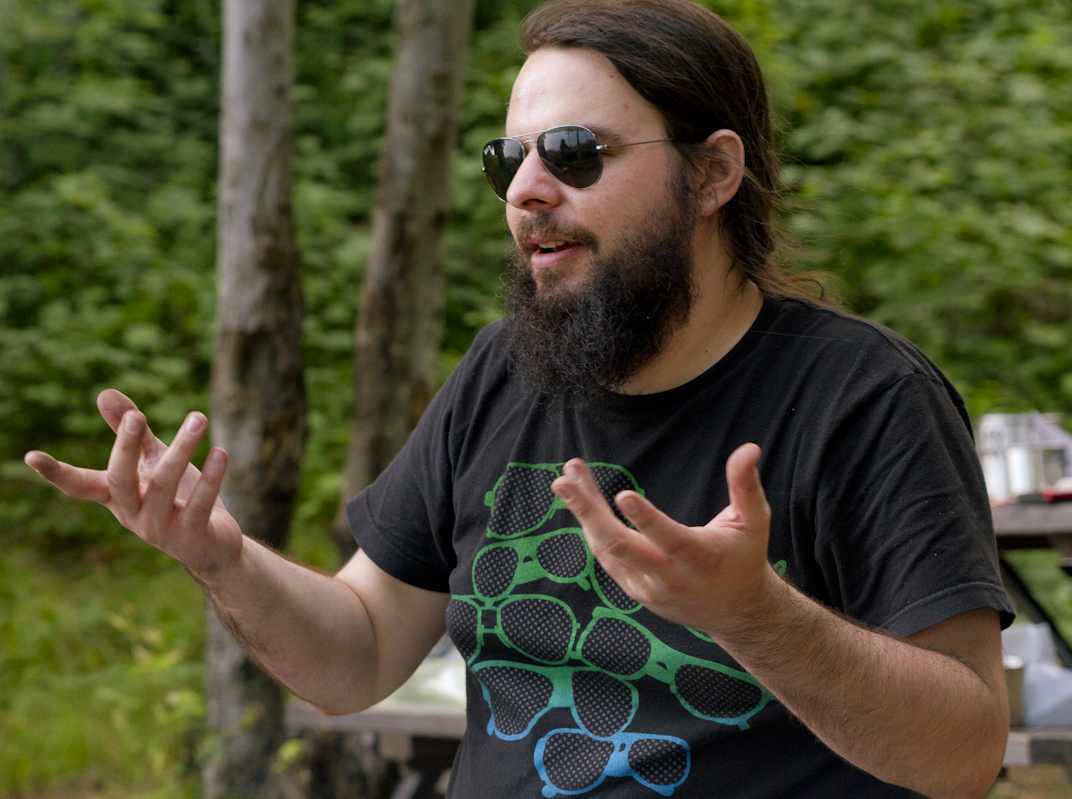
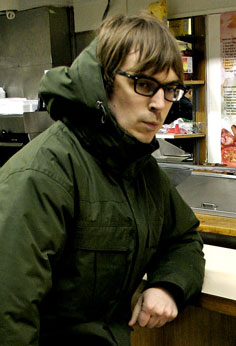
Indie developer Shawn McGrath (left) contributed the game's core mechanic, but left early in development. Jason "6955" DeGroot (right) was a composer and producer before also leaving the project.

Development continued with a more experimental ethos until the company began to run out of capital. The Canadian government loan that had funded Polytron's prototyping phase was not renewed for their production phase. They also lost funding from the organization that preceded the Indie Fund as Polytron's producer left the company. Fish borrowed money from friends and family for three months to keep the company open. In dire straits, he considered canceling the project. In March 2011, the nearby Québécois developer-publisher Trapdoor offered to help Polytron, having just signed a deal with Electronic Arts to publish their own game, Warp. Trapdoor assisted with Polytron's finances and operations and offered to treat them as part of their company and let them keep their intellectual property rights in exchange for a portion of Fez's earnings. Fish felt that partnership rescued the game. (Note: Polytron itself became an indie game publisher in June 2014.)

Fish is shown preparing for Fez's March 2011 PAX East booth in the 2012 documentary film Indie Game: The Movie, which chronicles the stories of several indie developers at various stages of their games' development cycles. As a subplot, the film presents Fish amidst a legal dispute with a former business partner that jeopardizes the game's future. The partner, believed to be Jason DeGroot, is portrayed negatively and does not participate onscreen. The film's end credits were later corrected to reflect that Fish's business partner was not asked for input. Game Informer called Fish the film's "most memorable developer", and Rock, Paper, Shotgun wrote that Fish is portrayed as melodramatic, theatrical, and neurotic, in a way that exacerbates his outspoken public perception. Eurogamer said that the part where Fish resolves to kill himself if he does not release his game is "the film's most startling moment".

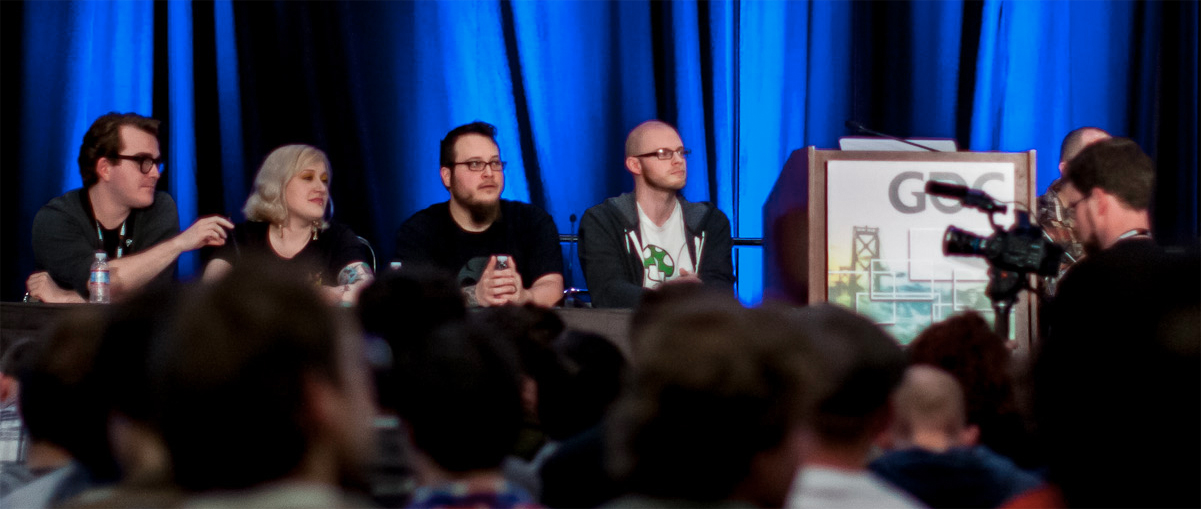
Fish (far left) on Indie Game: The Movie cast discussion panel at GDC 2012

Fez won the Audience Choice Award at the September 2011 Fantastic Arcade, Best in Show and Best Story/World Design at the October 2011 Indiecade, and the Seumas McNally Grand Prize at the 2012 GDC Independent Games Festival. (Note: Fez was also a finalist in Technical Excellence and an honorable mention in Excellence in Audio at the 2011 Independent Games Festival, as well as a finalist in Best Debut at the 13th Annual Game Developers Choice Awards in 2013.) It was also a 2011 Penny Arcade Expo "PAX 10" selection. Fez was displayed in its entirety in a secluded lounge room at the October 2011 GameCity festival in Nottingham, England. Fish considered the demo their most fruitful yet. Fish told a Gamasutra reporter that he had received positive feedback from Independent Games Festival Chairman Brandon Boyer and Braid designer Jonathan Blow. Near the end of development, Fish felt "burnt out" and that his personal health had suffered. The final game included almost none of the original work from the first two years of development. After several delays, Fez was submitted for certification in February 2012.

=== Release ===
Fez was released on April 13, 2012, and sold 200,000 copies in its yearlong exclusivity to the Xbox Live Arcade platform. Several months later, Polytron became embroiled in a high-profile dispute with Microsoft over the cost of patching the game. Polytron had released a fix that resolved many of the game's technical issues but introduced another that corrupted the saved games for about one percent of users. They withdrew the patch, but found Microsoft's fee for subsequent patch releases unviable, and chose to reinstate the withdrawn patch as their most utilitarian option. Polytron drew ire for the decision, which raised awareness for the business needs of indie developers. In July 2013, a year later, Microsoft announced that they no longer charged for patches, and Fish tweeted that Polytron's patch would take "a couple of months". Speaking in retrospect of the release, Fish "fiercely criticized" Fez co-publisher Microsoft Games Studios for botching the game's release. Fish cited a lack of promotion and publicity, and poor advertising of the game on Microsoft's digital market.

At times it seemed as though the noise surrounding Fez might drown out the game's own voice ... There were the controversial outbursts from creator Phil Fish in the press; the rumours of vicious infighting during development; the endless delays and, of course, the big-shot movie documenting the struggling creator's days as his life fell apart around the game in painful slow-motion.

— Simon Parkin of Eurogamer on their 2012 Game of the Year

In March 2013, Fish announced a May 1, 2013 release for the game's PC port, and opened preorders on GOG.com and Steam. The game's OS X and Linux ports debuted in the pay-what-you-want Humble Indie Bundle 9 on September 11, 2013. Polytron announced ports for PlayStation 4, PlayStation 3, and PlayStation Vita in August 2013 as in development through BlitWorks, which were released on March 25, 2014. The PlayStation releases include cross-console support for cross-buy (where one digital purchase allows access across multiple consoles) and "cross-save" (game save sharing between consoles), as well as support for 3D televisions, the DualShock 4 controller's decorative lightbar, and graphical upgrades due to the full port into the C++ programming language. Ports for Ouya and iOS were also announced. Fish announced eventual ports for "'pretty much' every platform" but the Nintendo 3DS.

Bédard planned to leave Polytron after finishing Fez to experience work with a full development team, but stayed to port the Windows release before joining Toronto's Capybara Games. He credited the game's long development cycle to his own inexperience in game development (compounded by the team's small size and difficulty in setting reasonable milestones), the game's scope, and Fish's perfectionism. Fish had hoped that players would discuss Fez's nuances online after the game's release. Players collaborated online for a week to solve the final "monolith" puzzle by brute force. Ars Technica described the apparent end to the game's harder puzzles as "anticlimactic", but Fish told Eurogamer in March 2013 that hidden in-game secrets remain to be found.

More than three years after its digital launch, Fez received a physical release designed by Fish and limited to a signed edition of 500 in December 2015. The deluxe package included the soundtrack and a stylized red notebook with gold foil inlay.

An iOS port began development in April 2017 when a teaser trailer was released. It was released in December 2017.

== Design ==
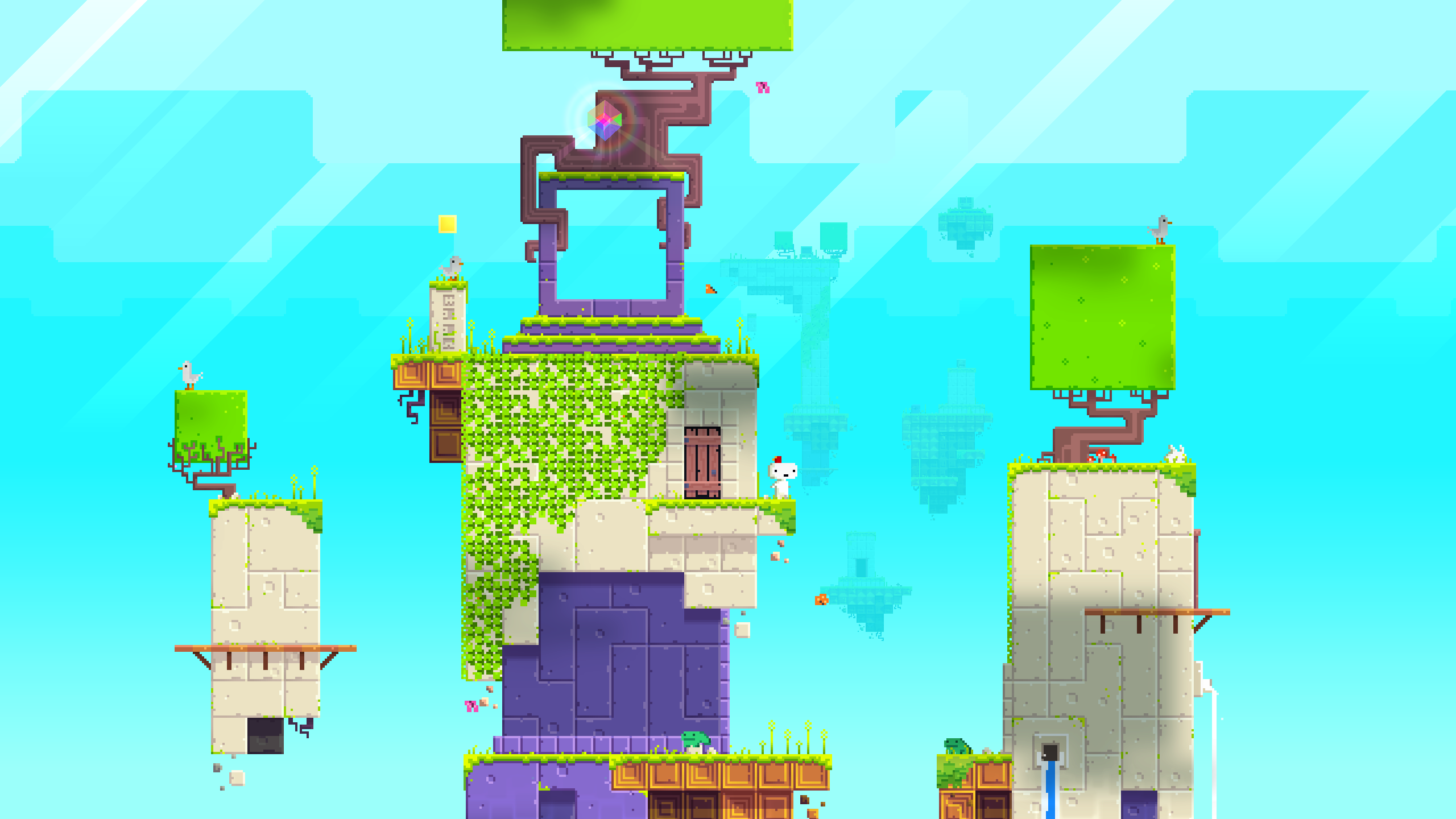
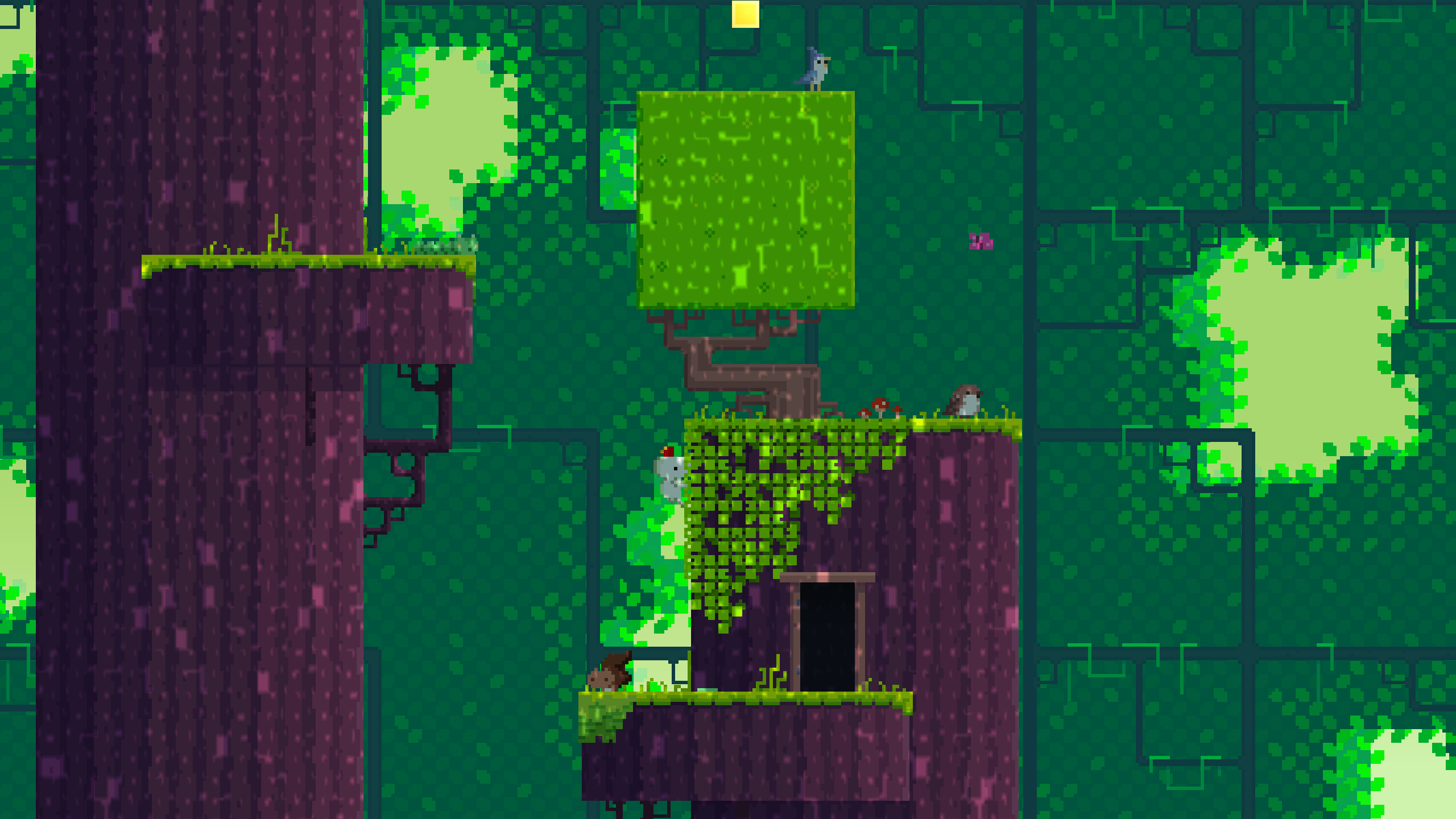
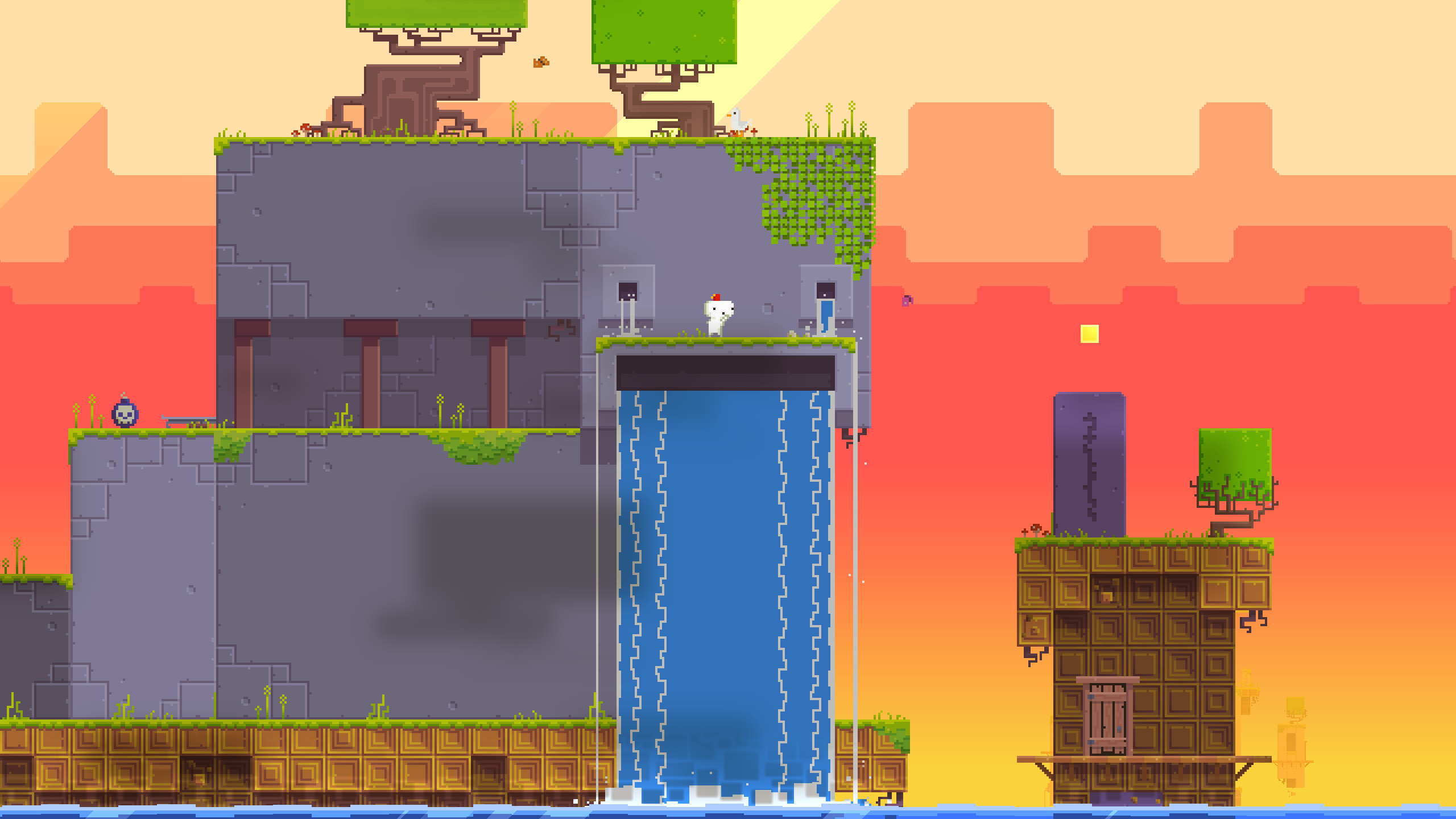
Screenshots of gameplay

When Bédard joined the project, the game focused on the 2D–3D mechanic and did not yet have open world ambitions. He coded the game in Microsoft Visual C# Express and XNA Game Studio Express. His first task, the level editor Fezzer, was coded from scratch in XNA and inspired by SketchUp. Bédard also wrote the game engine, Trixel Technology, which turns 2D tiles ("triles") into sides of a 3D cube pixel. (Note: Bédard distinguished the "trixels" from voxels of the 90s Westwood Studios games in that the shape of his cubed pixels' sides remain square for a more pixelated look.) The engine tracks player-character Gomez in 3D space even though the game behaves as a 2D platformer. Bédard also built the game to resolve collisions when converting between 3D and 2D space.

Fish created pixel art in Photoshop for each tiled side ("trile") of the 3D trixel that Bédard's custom software compiled into 3D game assets, which Fish would extrude as surfaces in Fezzer to build levels. Fish found the level design process "overwhelming", and Bédard has said he was relieved that it was not his job. Fish compared his design process to playing with Lego blocks, and planned the more involved levels in graph paper to first visualize the 2D views before building the levels in the 3D software. The levels and puzzles were not preordained in a design document, and many of the drafts levels scrapped in 2008 resurfaced to be used later in the production process. So as to fit the rotation mechanic, the levels were made tall instead of wide, and the first part of the game was designed to acclimate the player to 2D controls before introducing the 3D element. As they worked, Fish first proposed ideas that Bédard would implement. The two would then discuss and fine-tune the addition—they worked well together.

Fish describes the game's changes during development as "organic"—they tested different kinds of levels and replicated the types of in-game exploration that the team appreciated most. It came to adopt Metroidvania mechanics, with "secret passages, warp gates, and cheat codes". Fish cited Myst as another touchstone and compared its open world, nonlinear narrative, and "obtuse metapuzzles" to Fez's own alphabet, numeric system, and an "almost unfairly hard to get" "second set of collectibles". Fish originally fought against having an in-game map because he wanted players to draft their own. After attempting to do so himself, he changed his mind. Fish later called the in-game map "probably one of the weakest aspects of the game". Fish also fought against including the navigational assistant, Dot, but later felt that the addition was successful and a positive contribution to the game's mythology. The fez itself, Fish described as an "ancient symbol of understanding the third dimension". Fez had three different animators through its development: Paul Robertson of Scott Pilgrim vs. the World: The Game, who did the game's animals and some of Gomez's animations, Adam Saltsman of Canabalt, and Graham Lackey, who did some character animations.

The game's mechanics were inspired by the Nintendo Entertainment System games Fish played in his youth, particularly Super Mario and The Legend of Zelda. Fish cited Fumito Ueda's Ico as the game's third inspiration, and he sought to emulate its feeling of nostalgic and isolated loneliness. Fish also sought to emulate Ueda's "design by subtraction" philosophy, where the Ico development team would periodically remove parts of the game so as to leave only what was essential to their vision. In this way, ideas like player health and object weight puzzles were gradually struck from Fez. (Note: Specifically, Polytron had implemented Zelda-esque heart pieces for player health and weight-triggered switch object weight puzzles that required vases to be filled with water—aspects unrelated to the core rotation mechanic. Even before they were removed, Polytron still did not let the player-character Gomez "die" after losing all his hearts.) Fish made a personal challenge of designing a game without relying on "established mechanics". As such, Fez was always a peaceful game and there was never an enemy coded into the game. So as to better emulate Hayao Miyazaki's signature "open blue sky", "feel-good" atmosphere, Fish watched all of the director's films one weekend early in the development cycle.

== See also ==
- Development of Duke Nukem Forever – another game with a protracted development cycle
- Development of Spore – another game with a high-profile development cycle
