= Heather Kelley =

American media artist and video game designer

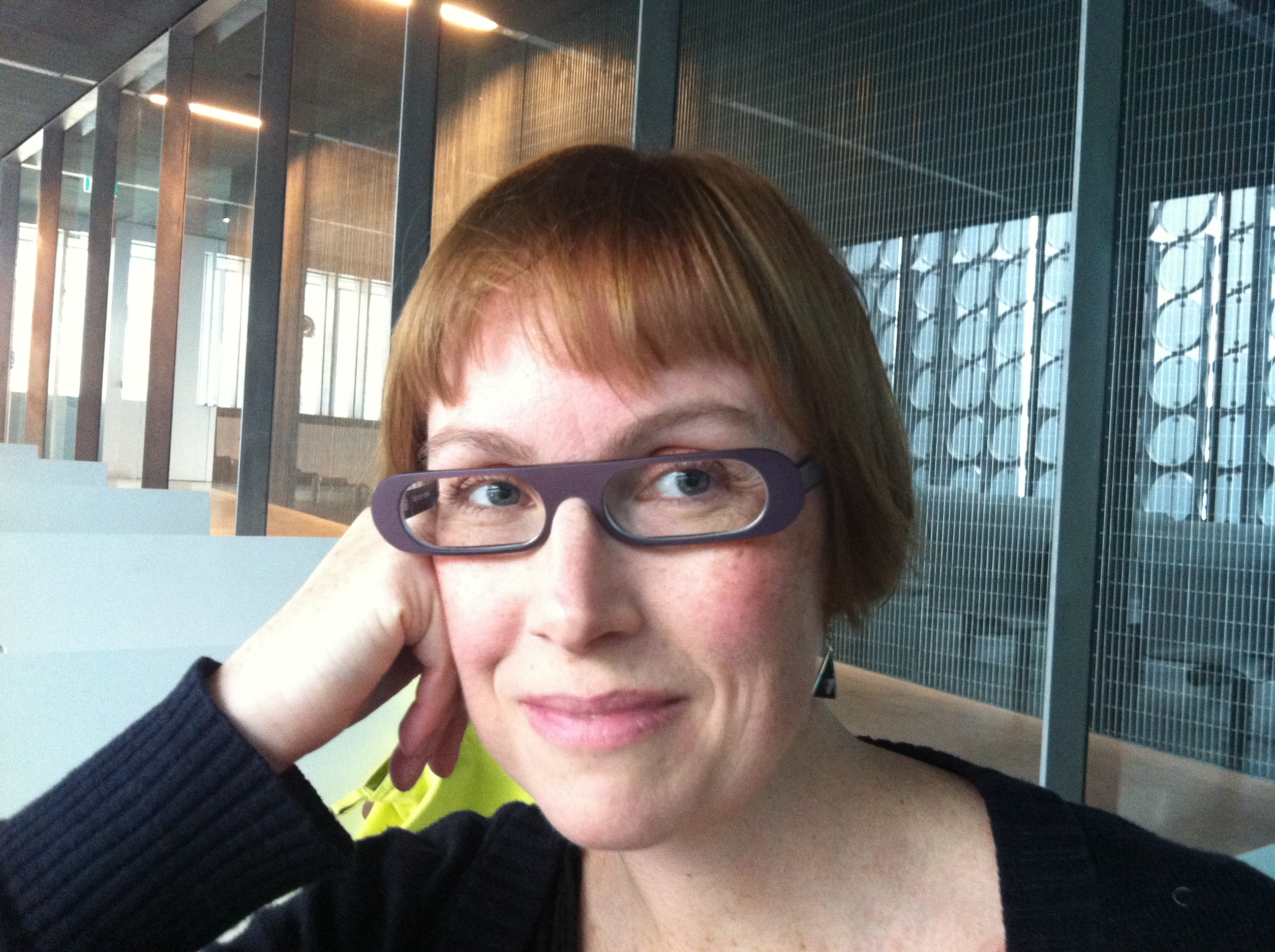
- Heather Kelley in 2012
- Citizenship: United States
- Occupations: Game designer, writer, media artist
- Writing career
- Pen name: Moboid

Heather Kelley, also known as Moboid, is an American game designer, media artist, curator, educator and writer. She is a co-founder of the experimental game collective Kokoromi, which organized the Gamma events for experimental games. Her work includes commercial games, art games, interactive installations, personal pleasure software and projects involving sensory forms of interaction.

Kelley's career has included work on commercial console games, handheld games, interactive toys and web communities. As Moboid, she created interactive projections using game engines including Quake and Unreal.

She was Creative Director on the UNFPA Electronic Game to End Gender Violence at the Emergent Media Center at Champlain College in Burlington, Vermont. For seven years, Kelley served as co-chair of the International Game Developers Association's Women in Game Development Special Interest Group.

Kelley joined the Entertainment Technology Center at Carnegie Mellon University in 2015 and is an Associate Teaching Professor there. She is also Sensory Director of LIKELIKE, an independent experimental game arcade and space for playable arts in Pittsburgh. Kelley gave keynote talks at Nordic Game Jam in 2009 and 2019.

== Project examples ==
- Lapis (2005) Lapis is an interactive art work designed to help teach women how to reach orgasm by simulating the effect of pleasurable sensation on a cartoon bunny.
- Fabulous/Fabuleux (2008) – An experimental art game collaboration with Lynn Hughes. Fabulous/Fabuleux was created at Concordia University's Hexagram Institute and integrates gameplay into a full-body interactive installation using custom "squishy" interface hardware.
- Body Heat (2010) – Body Heat is a vibrator interface for the iPhone and iPad which allows touchscreens to be used for adjusting vibration speed, intensity, and patterns. The project was first presented at the sex tech conference Arse Elektronika in September 2010 in San Francisco. The company OhMiBod, which specializes in music-driven vibrators, bought the application and renamed it into "OhMiBod app" in early 2011.
- Joue Le Jeu (2012) – An exhibition at La Gaîté Lyrique in Paris, France. It showcased new forms of games and creative game design. The event was a hands-on exhibition of interactive play.
- “Trente pas entre terre et ciel: Version Musicale” (2018) – An installation debuted in Toronto, Canada. The project is a long hopscotch, designed to be played by multiple pairs of players at once.
- Fortuitous Orbits and the Hazards They Contain (2019) – A two-person Exhibition at Arizona State University, ArtSpace West.
- Housed Within Marrow (2020) – Carnegie Mellon University. Virtual.

== Awards ==
Kelley's game concept Lapis, based on female masturbation, won the 2006 MIGS Game Design Challenge.

In Spring 2008, she was Kraus Visiting assistant professor of art, and Adjunct Faculty at the Entertainment Technology Center, at Carnegie Mellon University, where she organized The Art of Play symposium and art game arcade.

In September 2009, she was Artist in Residence for Subotron at Quartier21, Museumsquartier Vienna. Her biographical sex game concept with Erin Robinson, Our First Times, won the 2009 GDC Game Design Challenge,

She was part of Fast Company's 2011 list of 'most influential women in technology'.

In March 2013 she was awarded the "GDC 2013 Women in Gaming Award" as "Innovator", granted for breakthrough innovation in her work.

DataBird Business Journal named Kelley in its 2019 list of 250 Inspiring Female Entrepreneurs.

== Video game credits ==
Kelley is credited on the following games:

- Let's Talk About Me (1995), Simon & Schuster Interactive.
- Thief: Deadly Shadows (2004), Eidos, Inc.
- Tom Clancy's Splinter Cell: Chaos Theory (2005), Ubisoft, Inc.
- Star Wars: Lethal Alliance (2006), Ubisoft, Inc.
- High School Musical: Makin' the Cut! (2007), Disney Interactive Studios.
- Today I Die (2009).
- Spider: The Secret of Bryce Manor (2009), Tiger Style LLC.
- 4 Minutes and 33 Seconds of Uniqueness (2009), Kloonigames Ltd.
- Waking Mars (2012), Tiger Style LLC.
- Fez (2012), Microsoft Studios, Trapdoor, Inc.
- THE DANCINGULARITY (2012), Kokoromi, PC.
- Window Vistas (2014), Mac.
- SuperHyperCube (2016), Sony PlayStation VR.
- Guilty Smells (2019), PC.

== Film credits ==
Kelley co-produced the nerd documentary Traceroute (2016).

== Publications ==
Kelley has contributed to the following publications:

- "'EyeToy Play,' 'Animal Crossing,' 'Wii Sports'" in Space Time Play: Synergies Between Computer Games, Architecture and Urbanism. Sub-editor. Borries, Böttger, and Walz, ed., Birkhäuser, Basel, October 2007.
- On Turtles and Dragons and the Dangerous Quest for a Media Art Notation System. Contributing writer, contributing editor. Time's Up, Linz, 2012.
- “Proverted Pleasures: Orgasm and Gameplay” in Screw The System: Explorations of Spaces, Games and Politics through Sexuality and Technology. Grenzfurthner, Friesinger, and Fabry, ed., RE/Search Publications, 2014.
- Social Web and Interaction: Social Media Technologies for European National and Regional Museums. Contributing writer. European Museums Exhibiting Europe. 2014.
- Women in Gaming: 100 Professionals of Play. Contributor. Marie, ed. Roseville, CA, Prima Games, 2018.
