= Phil Fish =

French-Canadian former indie video game designer

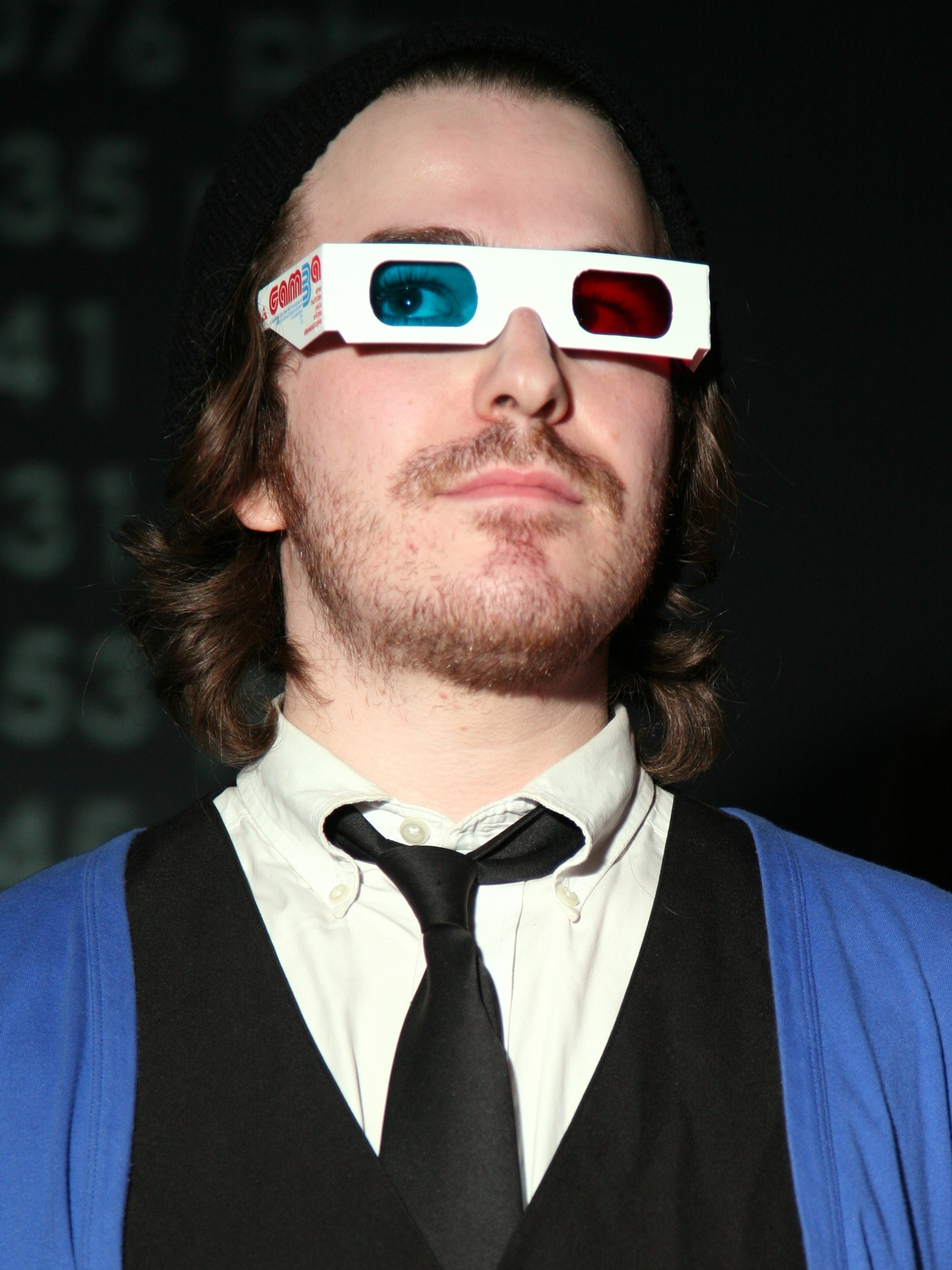
- Fish at GAMMA 3D in 2008
- Born: Philippe Poisson; 1984 (age 41–42); Montreal, Quebec, Canada
- Occupation: Game designer
- Employer: Polytron Corporation
- Known for: Fez

Philippe Poisson (born November 1, 1984), better known as Phil Fish, is a Canadian former indie game designer best known for the 2012 platformer Fez. He was born and raised in Quebec, where his experiences with Nintendo games in his youth would later influence his game design. He studied game design at the Montreal National Animation and Design Centre, and worked at Ubisoft and Artificial Mind and Movement before starting Polytron in 2008.

Fish was a founding member of Kokoromi, a collective that explores experimental gameplay ideas, and organized Montreal's annual GAMMA games events. While Fez was in development, Fish worked on other unreleased games at Polytron including SuperHyperCube and Power Pill. Fez was released in April 2012 to widespread acclaim after a protracted five-year development cycle. Its final phases of development were shown in the 2012 documentary Indie Game: The Movie, which brought Fish fame unusual for game developers.

Following an online argument and doxxing, Fish publicly announced his exit from game development twice over the next two years, citing long-term mistreatment by the industry. Polytron later published the 2015 Panoramical, and Fish returned with Kokoromi to release SuperHyperCube in 2016.

== Early life and career ==
Phil Fish was born Philippe Poisson in Montreal in 1984. He was raised in Quebec, where his parents shared their interest in art and gaming with him. Fish's father translated The Legend of Zelda into French so the two could play together. Fish credits these memories as formative, and later cited their influence on Fez. He graduated from the 2004 Design and Digital Art for Video Games program at the Montreal NAD (National Animation and Design Centre).

Fish began his career at the video game publisher Ubisoft, where he worked on Open Season as a level designer. He was initially excited for the job but grew disenchanted with their large development teams and working conditions. Fish later described it as "the worst experience of [his] life". He was later fired from the company.

On May 24, 2006, Fish won the Artificial Mind and Movement Award for Best Cut-Scene at the annual NAD Center Awards of Excellence Gala. Later that year, Fish began work as a level designer at Artificial Mind and Movement, where he designed for film tie-in games including The Golden Compass.

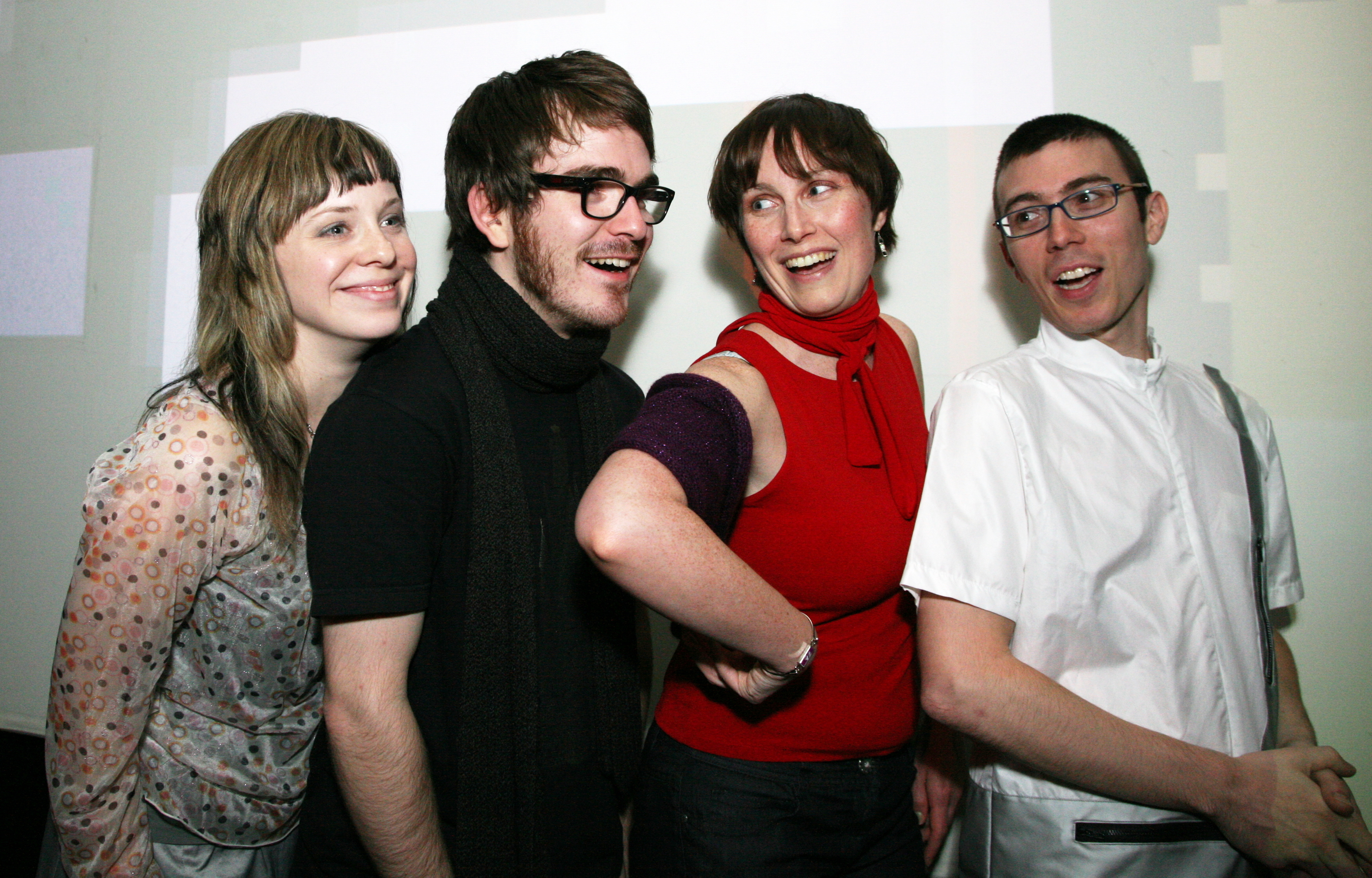
Fish (second from left) with Kokoromi in 2007

Fish is a founding member of Kokoromi, a group that designs and promotes experimental video games. His November 2006 Arcadia Festival event, GAMMA 01 Audio Feed, featured games that incorporated live sound. Fish planned a similar event, GAMMA 256, for 2007, and a third event, GAMMA 3D, for November 2008 in Montreal. Fish was invited to present a lecture on GAMMA 01 at the 2007 Game Developers Conference. He also wrote a review of the 1999 Legacy of Kain: Soul Reaver in the 2007 book Space Time Play: Synergies Between Computer Games, Architecture and Urbanism: the Next Level.

Fish has been characterized by Sean Hollister of The Verge as "notorious for voicing angry, controversial opinions about the state of video games". In a notable incident at the Game Developers Conference in March 2012, a Japanese developer asked Fish for his opinion on modern Japanese games, to which Fish replied, "your games just suck". Many condemned Fish's comment as racist; Alex Donaldson of VG247 wrote in 2023 that it "became the banner-bearer" for racist Western attitudes towards Japanese-developed games. Conversely, Mega Man co-creator Keiji Inafune defended Fish's remark as necessary criticism. Fish initially defended the comments, but later acknowledged that he had been rude and apologized.

== Polytron ==
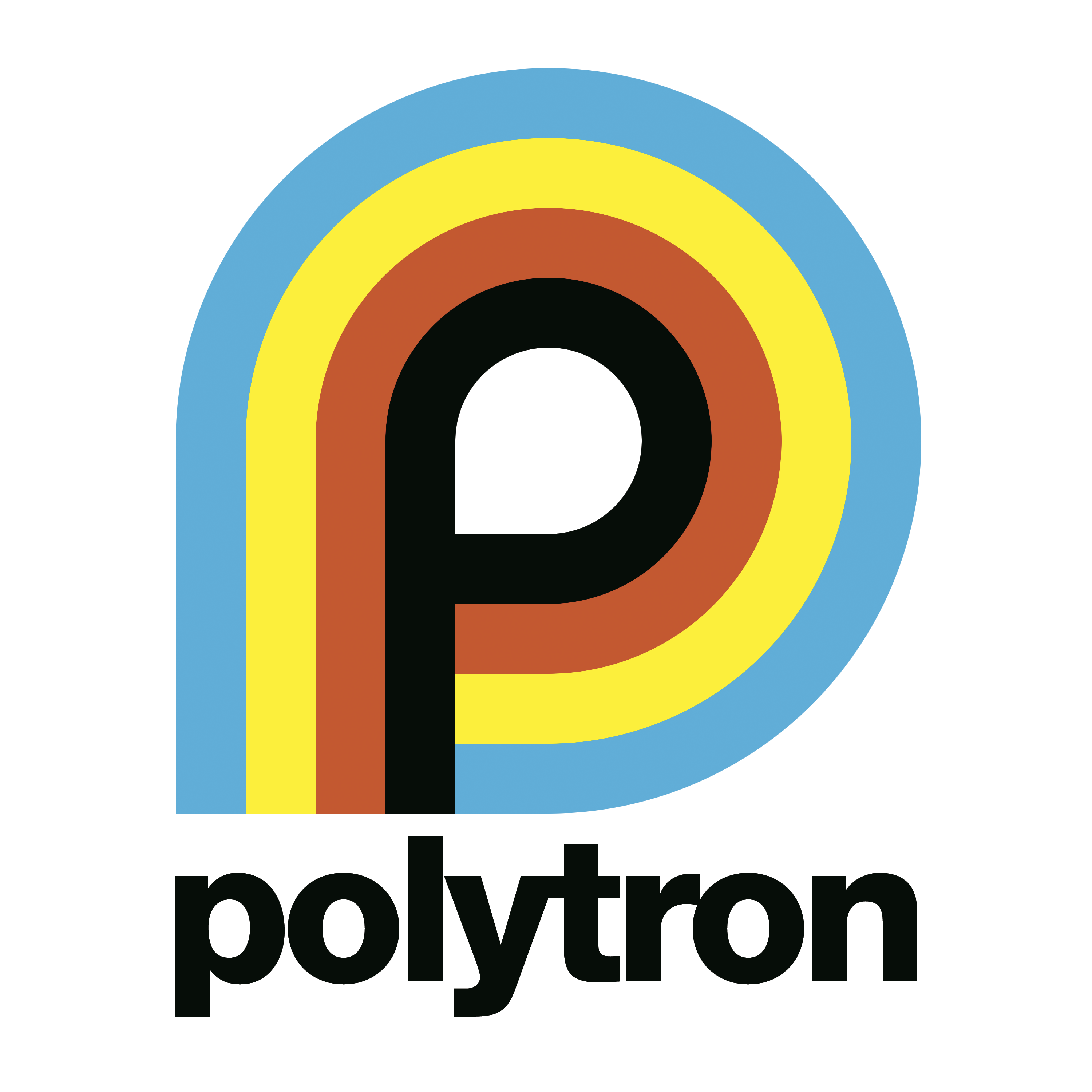
Fish left Artificial Mind and Movement to set up Polytron Corporation, his indie startup company.

Fish began to work with Toronto-based indie developer Shawn McGrath on McGrath's idea for a puzzle game that showed 2D views of a 3D space. Fish provided the project's art until the partnership crumbled due to creative differences: Fish wanted their product to be more of a platform game. Fish continued to work on the game in his spare time, and incorporated the idea of voxels (3D pixels), where a 2D pixel could be seen from four sides. The game would become Fez and the game's design, lore, and art derived from this game mechanic. Fish searched for a programmer on DeviantArt and Renaud Bédard, the first person to apply, became the game's programmer. Fez was first announced in July 2007 and was nominated for two awards at the 2008 Game Developers Conference Independent Games Festival. Fish's employer, Artificial Mind and Movement, would not let him take leave from work to attend, so Fish quit. He marked this January 2008 moment as "when I became indie". The game received widespread attention upon its showing at the festival, leading Fish to open Polytron Corporation as a startup company with a government loan.

Polytron later ran out of money and was on the verge of folding when the company's Québécois neighbor, developer-producer Trapdoor, offered to help Polytron without transferring its intellectual property rights. According to Fish, the partnership saved Fez. The game was delayed several times over the next few years for which it received some notoriety.

In late 2009, Polytron presented an iPhone game called Power Pill at Pecha Kucha Montreal. The game features a panacean pill that travels through human bodies as its playable protagonist, and it uses the iPhone's multi-touch screen. GameSetWatch's Eric Caoili compared it to Soul Bubbles and Irritating Stick. The game was developed with Alec Holowka of Infinite Ammo, and a level editor was expected to be included. While working on Fez, Fish revived a game project called SuperHyperCube, which was based on Wiimote motion capture input and stereoscopic navigation. Fish felt the game would work better with the new Kinect motion tracking. The adapted game was a finalist at Indiecade 2011.

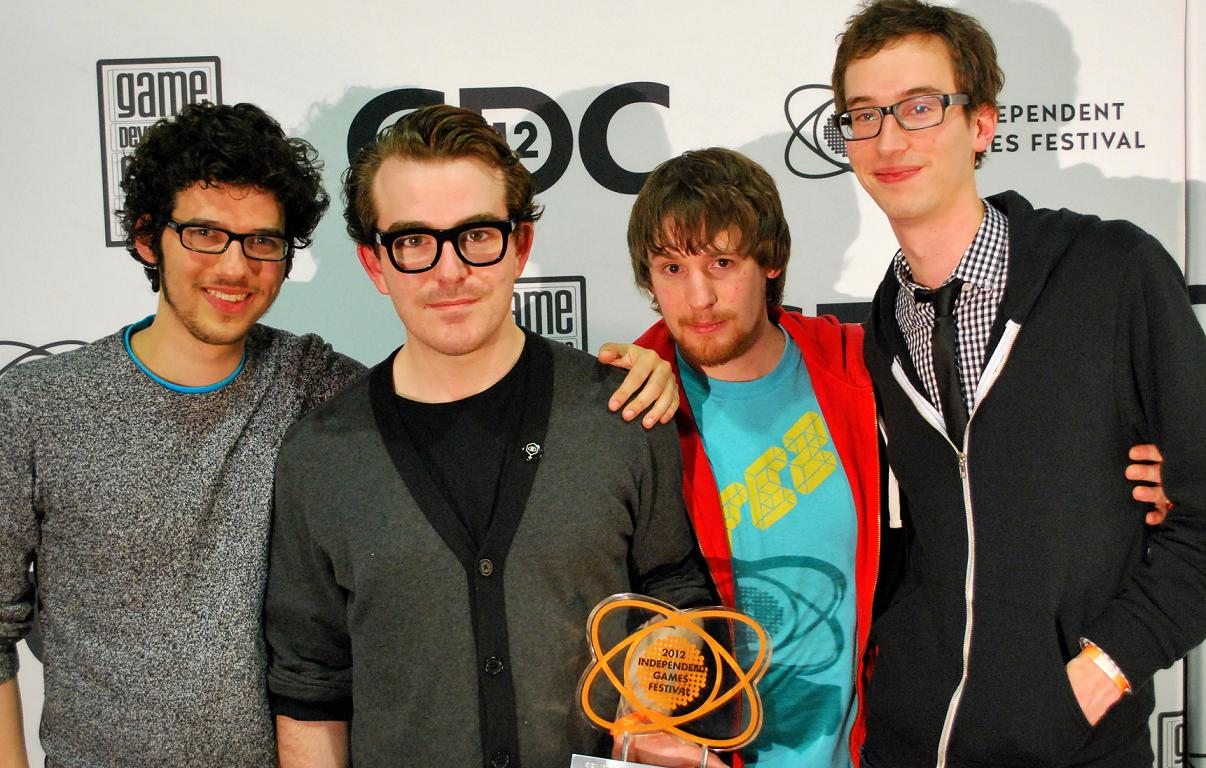
Fez development team at the 2012 GDC IGF (from left): composer Rich Vreeland, designer Phil Fish, sound designer Brandon McCartin, programmer Renaud Bédard

Fish and Fez were featured prominently in the 2012 documentary Indie Game: The Movie, through which Fish received celebrity unusual for game developers. The film chronicles the stories of several indie developers at various stages of their games' development cycles, and Fish is shown preparing for Fez's booth at PAX East in March 2011. The film presents Fish amidst a legal dispute with a former business partner that jeopardizes the game's release. The ex-partner, Jason DeGroot (a musician who contributed to the game), is portrayed negatively and is not shown on-screen. The film also tracks Fish's personal and emotional investment in the game. Eurogamer wrote that the scene where Fish resolves to kill himself if he does not release his game is "the film's most startling moment". Rock, Paper, Shotgun wrote that Fish is portrayed as melodramatic, existential, theatrical, and neurotic in contrast with the other developers shown in the film, which would exacerbate his outspoken public perception. Game Informer called Fish the film's "most memorable developer".

Near the end of development, Fish felt "burnt out" and that his personal health had suffered. Fez was released on April 13, 2012, and sold 200,000 copies in its yearlong exclusivity to the Xbox Live Arcade platform. Video game review aggregator Metacritic described its reception as "generally favorable" and that of the 2013 PC version as "universal acclaim". While in development, Fez had won the 2012 GDC Independent Games Festival's Seamus McNally Grand Prize, the 2011 Indiecade Best in Show and Best Story/World Design, and the 2008 GDC Independent Games Festival's Excellence in Visual Art. Eurogamer awarded Fez a perfect score and named the "perfect, wordless sci-fi parable" their 2012 Game of the Year. The game sold one million copies by the end of 2013 and Fish announced eventual ports for most video game platforms. The New York Times's Chris Suellentrop likened Fish to "a Quentin Tarantino of 8-bit gaming".

=== After Fez ===
Fez 2 is cancelled. I am done. I take the money and I run. This is as much as I can stomach. This isn't the result of any one thing, but the end of a long, bloody campaign. You win.

— Fez 2 cancellation post on Polytron's website

A Fez sequel was announced as "one more thing" at end of the Horizon indie game press conference during the June 2013 Electronic Entertainment Expo. A Twitter argument between Fish and GameTrailers journalist Marcus Beer a month later culminated in the project's cancellation and Fish's announced exit from the industry. In an episode of his show Invisible Walls, Beer had criticized Fish's recent response to questions about Microsoft's Xbox One self-publishing policy change. On Twitter, Fish condemned the industry for its negativity before his final tweet announced the cancellation and his leave. The news came as a surprise to the rest of Polytron, which has not commented on upcoming projects other than ports since the sequel's cancellation. Polygon listed Fish in their top 50 newsmakers of 2013 for the social power of his "caustic use of Twitter".

In June 2014, Fish announced Polytron Partners—a new effort by Polytron to fund and support potential indie game efforts, like a publisher. For their first game, Polytron would work with Finji to provide the daily operations capacity for an "interactive musical landscape anthology" game named Panoramical. Fish was an early target of Gamergate; his personal and company records were hacked and released publicly in August 2014. Fish responded by announcing that the company and Fez property were for sale.

After twice announcing his leave from the video game industry, Fish remained connected with Kokoromi. Together they finished SuperHyperCube in late 2016 as one of the first PlayStation VR games. He also designed the boot-up animations for the Analogue Super Nt console in 2017.

Fish spoke about the cancellation of Fez 2 and his self-declared departure from the industry in a 2023 interview on the My Perfect Console podcast. He claimed that the cancellation had less to do with the argument with Beer and more with his own lack of interest in creating a sequel. He called the Twitter spat an "out" borne from his own frustrations at having suddenly become a public figure from Indie Game: The Movie as well as the obligations of trying to build on his success by creating a sequel he did not care to make. By Fish's recollection, Fez 2 only had very basic concept art which made the cancellation decision easy. Fish claimed he was working on a new project, which he hinted may not be a video game.

== Ludography ==
Year	Title	Company	Role
2006	Open Season	Ubisoft	Level design
2007	The Golden Compass	Artificial Mind and Movement	Level design
Unreleased	Power Pill	-	Design
2012	Fez	Polytron	Design
2016	SuperHyperCube	Kokoromi	Design
