= Kokoromi =

Video game art collective

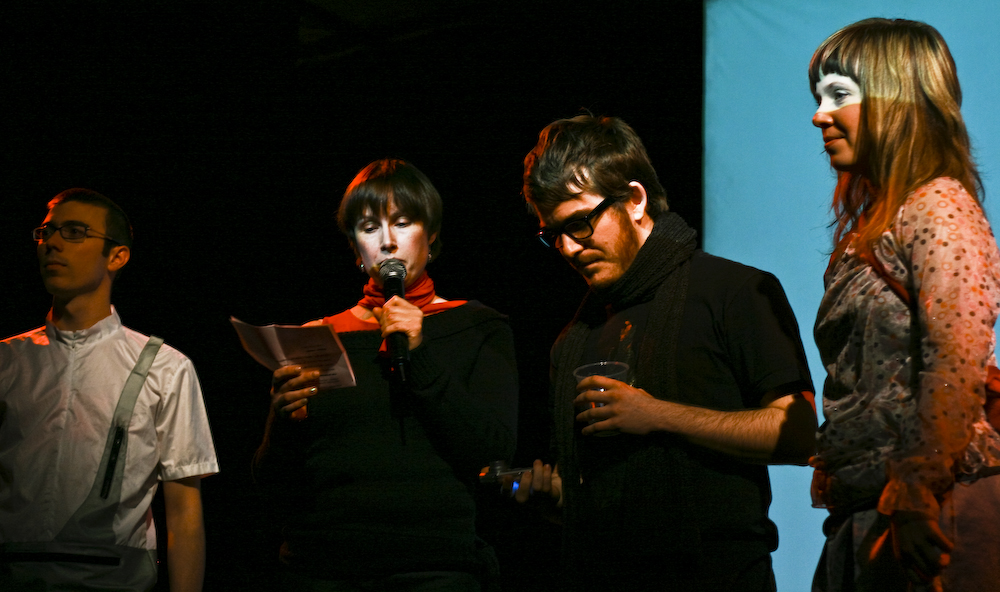
(from left to right: Damien Quartz, Heather Kelley, Phil Fish, and Cindy Poremba).

Kokoromi is a group with the intent of promoting video games as an art form, and experimental gameplay worldwide. The collective consists of independent videogame creators and curators Damien Quartz, Phil Fish, Heather Kelley, and Cindy Poremba. Most of the members met in 2005, working on a small game project for a cultural event in Montreal. The group was a pioneer in what came to be known as the "New Arcade".

Throughout its growth, the Kokoromi collective has organized several game related shows, including the Gamma events (Gamma: Audio Feed, gamma 256, GAMMA 3D and Gamma IV), usually encouraging designers to consider gameplay in experimental ways. Often, these events foster new talent on the independent gaming scene. Award-winning games submitted to and launched at Gamma have included Jason Rohrer's Passage, Steph Thirion's Faraway, The Copenhagen Game Collective's B.U.T.T.O.N., and Kokoromi's own SuperHyperCube. The group has also designed several independent game projects that follow its unique vision, most recently the dance party game Dancingularity—and its Drinkularity spin-off for the cocktail-robot event Roboexotica.

One of the founding members of Kokoromi, Phil Fish, has formed the independent game company Polytron, for the purpose of handling the development of the video game title Fez.

In 2015, the collective announced that superHYPERCUBE was being redeveloped for Sony's PlayStation VR. It was released as a launch title for the device on 13 October 2016.
