= Let's Talk About Me =

1995 girl-oriented activity centre video game

Let's Talk About Me is a 1995 girl-oriented activity centre video game developed by GirlGames Inc. and team smartyPants!, and published by Simon & Schuster Interactive. It was released on Macintosh, Windows, and Windows 3.x. A sequel entitled Let's Talk About Me Too was released in 1997.

== Development ==
Some of the proto girl's games were Jenny of the Prairie, Cave Girl Clair, Kirsten and her Family, and Sara and her Friends in the 1980s. In 1995, software designer Lara Groppe continued this trend by researching girl's use of computers; she found they used them for shorter bursts and preferred content that was educational as well as entertaining. As a result, she founded the company GirlGames in 1993 and created Let's Talk About Me as its debut title.

Heather Kelley was hired in October 1995 as the company moved from Houston to Texas; her role was to do research for the game. Groppe has apparently shown her resume to her mum, who said on the spot "hire her". She split her time between working on the game and on the website.

Development was unusual in the sense that the target market directly provided input in shaping the product rather than playtesting it upon completion. Success of market leaders such as this title, Purple Moon, Her Interactive, and Girl Tech would all be founded in 1997.

== Gameplay ==
The game plays as an activity center for 10-14-year-old girls, with both quizzes and minigames that explore themes such as horoscopes and fashion. The game consists of four sections entitled "My Personality," "My Body," "My Life," and "My Future", which excluding the last one that is based on conjecture mix educational content with fun gameplay. One such game explores the "perils of puberty". The sequel features sections entitled My Diary, My Hairmaster Deluxe, My Zodiac Zone, and My Personality.

SuperKids described it as an "interactive, multimedia version of Young Miss magazine".

== Critical reception ==
SuperKids felt the game offered a reason to get girls interested in using the computer, which was deemed a positive due to girls lagging behind boys when it came to PC use. Millennium Girls: Today's Girls Around the World felt it was a slow, girl-gendered counterpart to the "twitch" games that appealed to boys. New Trends in Software Methodologies, Tools and Techniques felt the games were excellent programs for teenage girls.

In its first eight months on the market, the game sold half a million copies. Critical Readings: Media And Gender felt the game's success in the marketplace offered proof that young women were a viable target market for video gaming.
