= Panoramical =

2015 video game

- Steam cover art
- Designer: Fernando Ramallo
- Composer: David Kanaga
- Platforms: Windows, OS X
- Release: September 17, 2015
- Genre: Adventure
- Mode: Single-player

Panoramical is a 2015 video game by Fernando Ramallo and David Kanaga for Windows and OS X.

== Gameplay ==
In Panoramical, the player explores and manipulates 15 abstract landscapes using gamepad, mouse, joystick, or MIDI controls. The game's guest composers include Baiyon and Doseone. A Pro license of the game is marketed for professional DJs to play in public.

== Development ==
Panoramical's development was supported by Finji, Indie Fund, and Polytron.
