= Fez (video game) =

2012 video game

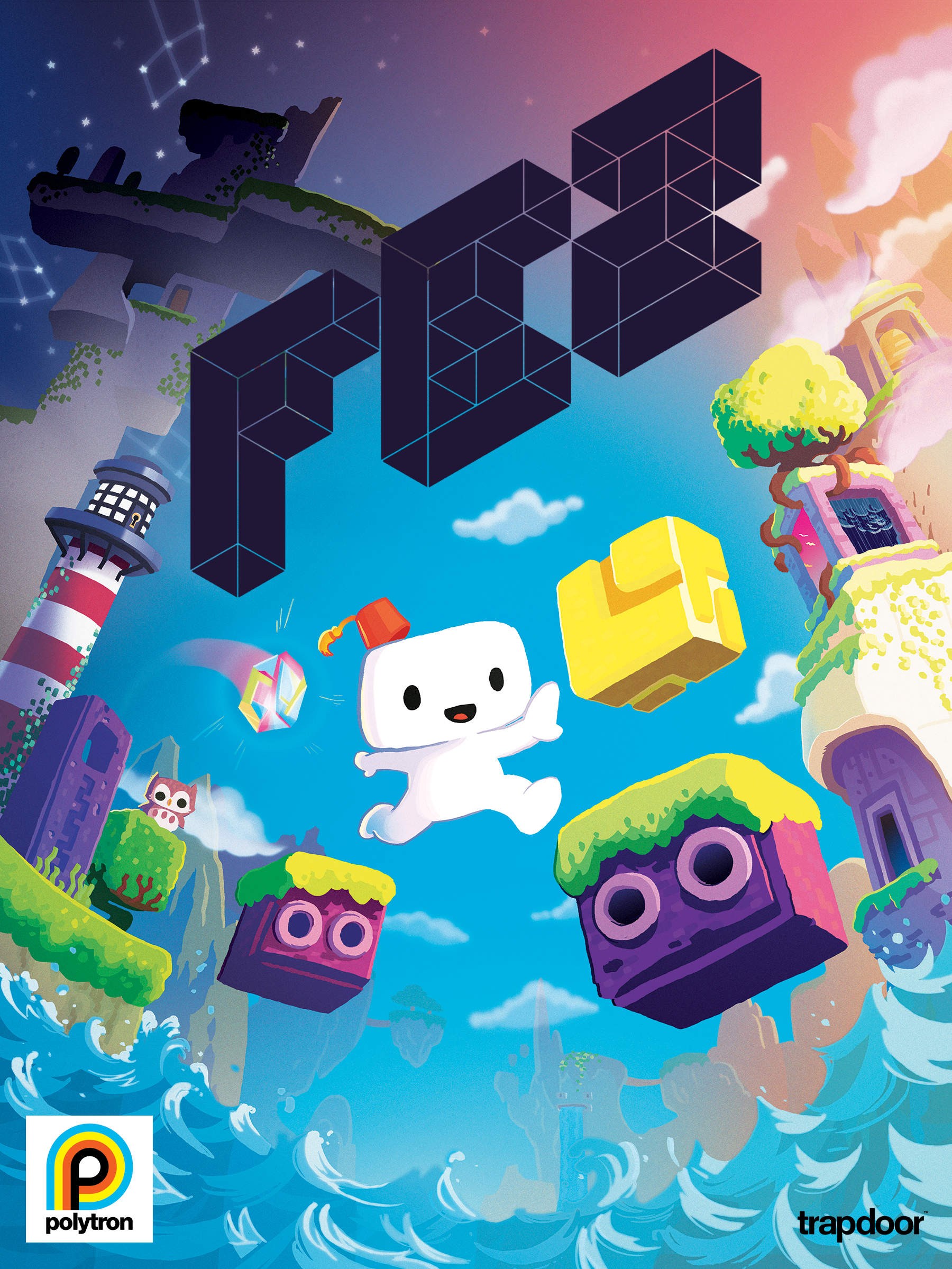
- Cover art by Bryan Lee O'Malley
- Developer: Polytron Corporation
- Publisher: Trapdoor
- Producers: Thomas Scott; Marie-Christine Bourdua
- Designer: Phil Fish
- Programmer: Renaud Bédard
- Composer: Disasterpeace
- Platforms: Xbox 360, Windows, Linux, OS X, PlayStation 3, PlayStation 4, PlayStation Vita, iOS, Nintendo Switch
- Release: Xbox 360; April 13, 2012; Microsoft Windows; May 1, 2013; Linux, OS X; September 11, 2013; PS3, PS4, PS Vita; March 25, 2014; iOS; December 13, 2017; Nintendo Switch; April 14, 2021
- Genre: Puzzle-platform
- Mode: Single-player

Fez is a 2012 indie puzzle-platform game developed by Polytron Corporation and published by Trapdoor. The player-character Gomez receives a fez that reveals his two-dimensional (2D) world to be one of four sides of a three-dimensional (3D) world. The player rotates between these four 2D views to realign platforms and solve puzzles. The objective is to collect cubes and cube fragments to restore order to the universe.

The game was called an "underdog darling of the indie game scene" during its high-profile and protracted five-year development cycle. Fez designer and Polytron founder Phil Fish gained celebrity status for his outspoken public persona and his prominence in the 2012 documentary Indie Game: The Movie, which detailed Fez's final stages of development and Polytron's related legal issues. Fez met critical acclaim upon its April 2012 release for Xbox Live Arcade. The game was ported to other platforms following the expiration of a yearlong exclusivity agreement.

Reviewers commended the game's emphasis on discovery and freedom, but criticized its technical issues, in-game navigation, and endgame backtracking. They likened the game's rotation mechanic to the 2D–3D shifts of Echochrome, Nebulus, Super Paper Mario, and Crush. Fez won awards including the Seumas McNally Grand Prize and Eurogamer's 2012 Game of the Year. It had sold one million copies by the end of 2013, and it influenced games such as Monument Valley, Crossy Road, and Secrets of Rætikon. A planned sequel was canceled when Fish abruptly left game development.

== Gameplay ==
Fez trial mode gameplay, demonstrating the rotation mechanic and game objectives

Fez is a two-dimensional (2D) puzzle platform game set in a three-dimensional (3D) world. The player-character Gomez lives peacefully on a 2D plane until he receives a red fez and witnesses the breakup of a giant, golden hexahedron that tears the fabric of spacetime and reveals a third dimension. After the game appears to glitch, reset, and reboot, the player can rotate between four 2D views of the 3D world, as four sides around a cube-like space. This rotation mechanic reveals new paths through the levels by connecting otherwise inaccessible platforms, and is the basis of Fez's puzzles. For example, floating platforms become a solid road, discontinuous ladders become whole, and platforms that move along a track stay on course. The object of the game is to collect cubes and cube fragments, which accrete to restore order to the universe. (Note: A minimum of 32 cubes are required to reach the game's ending. The cubes can be either of two types, cubes and "anti-cubes", and there are 64 of these in total.) In search of these cubes, Gomez traverses the game environment by jumping between ledges. Other platforming elements change with the level themes, including crates that activate switches, bombs that reveal passages, and pistons that launch Gomez airborne.

The basic idea for the 2D/3D aesthetic really just started with the Trixel idea. I figured that if we built our entire game world from these little cubes, all perfectly aligned on a 3D grid, we'd get this "3D Pixel" look.

— Fez designer Phil Fish, 2007 Gamasutra interview

The exploratory parts of the game feature a series of arcane codes and glyphs, treasure maps and chests, and secret rooms. Players are left without guidance to determine whether game elements are decipherable subpuzzles or simply false signals. These sorts of puzzles include hidden warp gates, enigmatic obelisks, invisible platforms, sequences of tetrominos, a ciphered alphabet, and QR codes. One of the game's recurring themes is an ancient civilization that attempted to make sense of their dimensionality, as told through artifacts.

Fez has no enemies, bosses, or punishments for failure—the player-character quickly respawns upon falling to his death. The game's designer described Fez as a "'stop and smell the flowers' kind of game". It prioritizes puzzle-solving and patience over the platforming genre's traditional interest in dexterity. Fez features a pixelated art style and a limited color palette reminiscent of the 8-bit era. Its homage includes Tetris tetrominos inscribed on the walls and in the sky, The Legend of Zelda treasure chest animations, Super Mario Bros. mushroom levels, travel by pipe, and floating platforms. (Note: Other gaming references include Nintendo Entertainment System-style sound effects, the navigational aide Dot (who says, "Hey! Listen!"), and sewer levels presented in the style of a Game Boy display.) The game's settings include forests, factories, a coastal lighthouse, an urban city, and a library. Fez's New Game Plus mode adds a first-person perspective feature and lets the player revisit areas to collect "anti-cubes" from harder puzzles. This second half of the game is more challenging and focuses on code cracking.

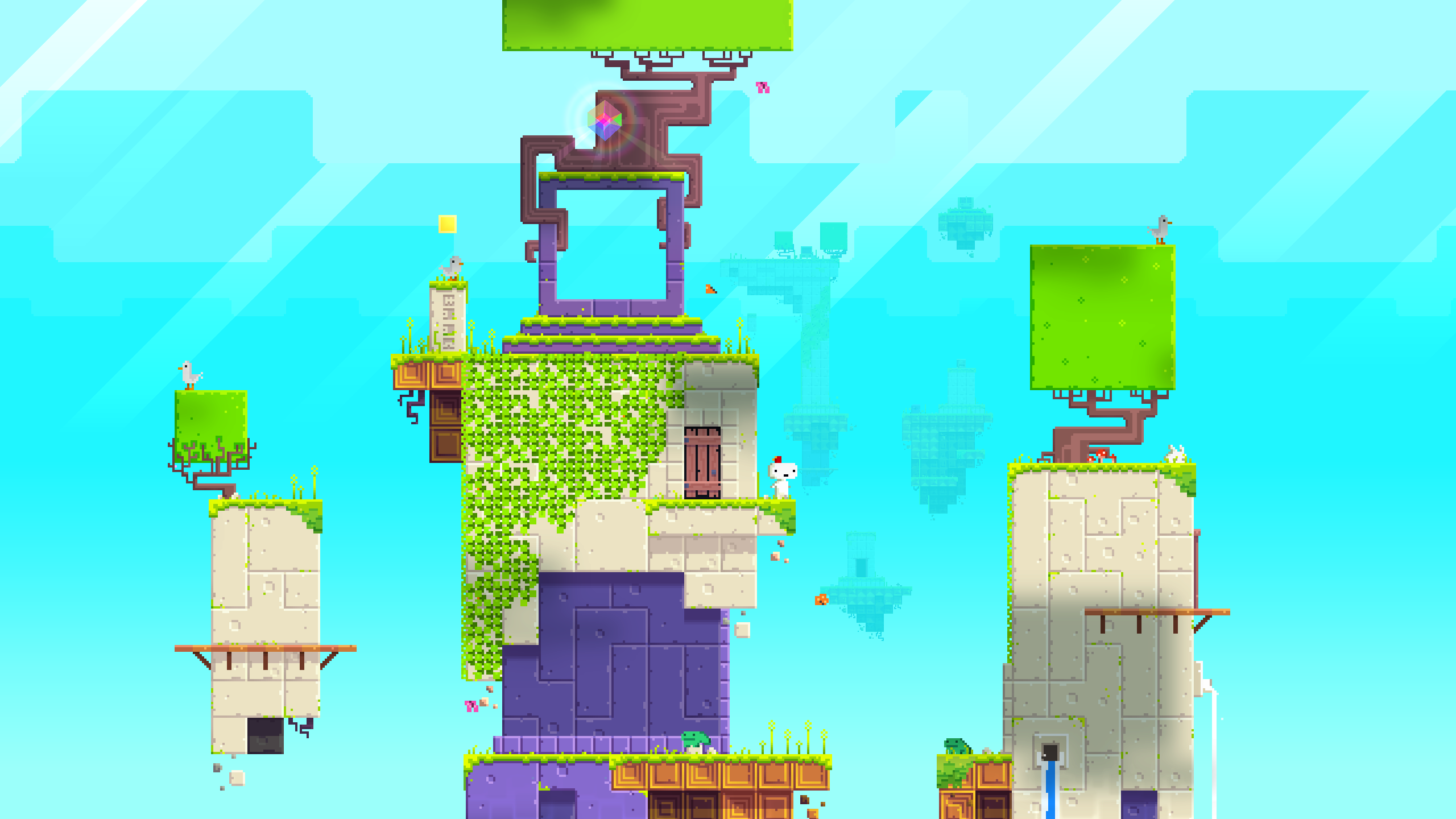
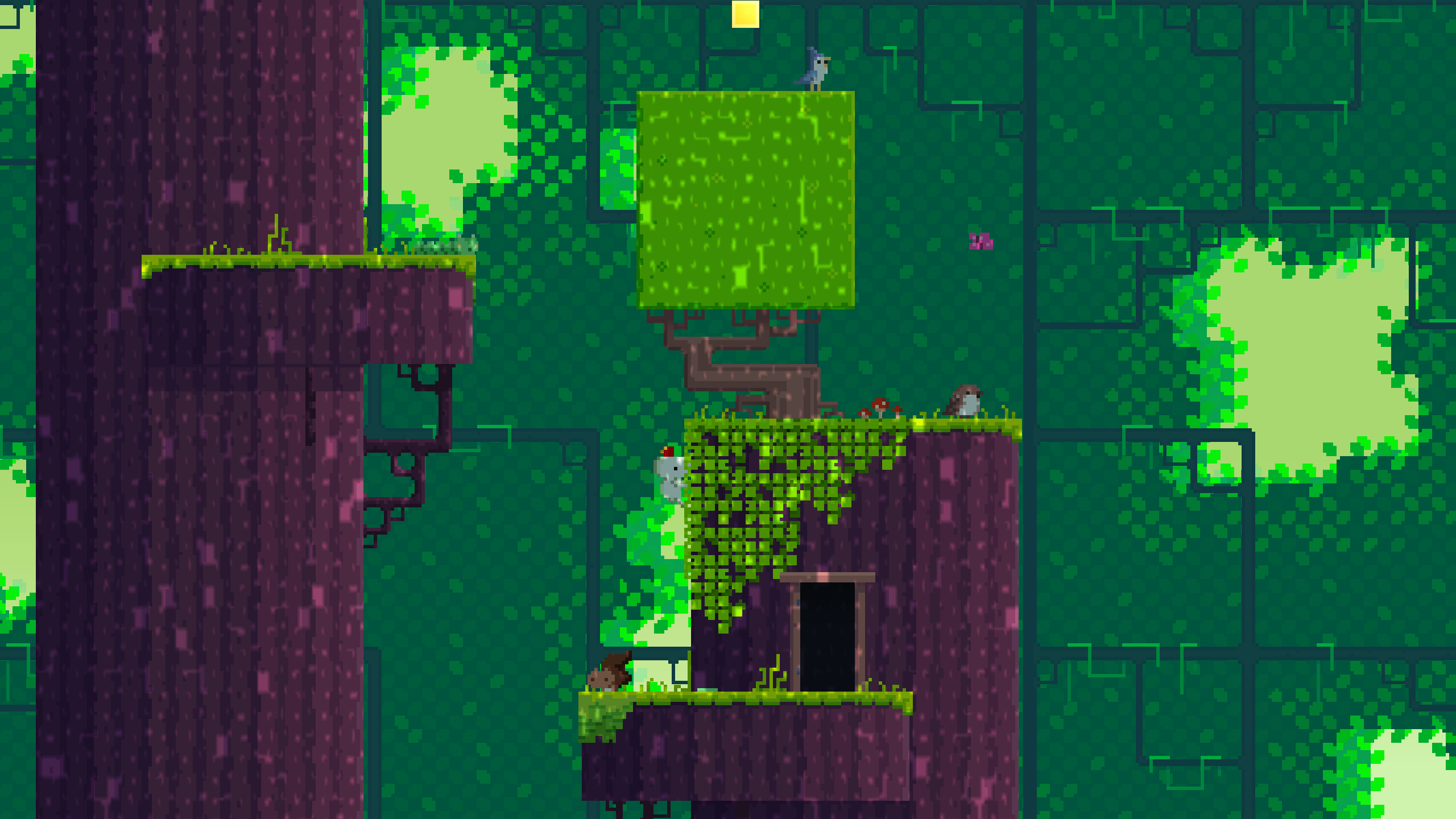
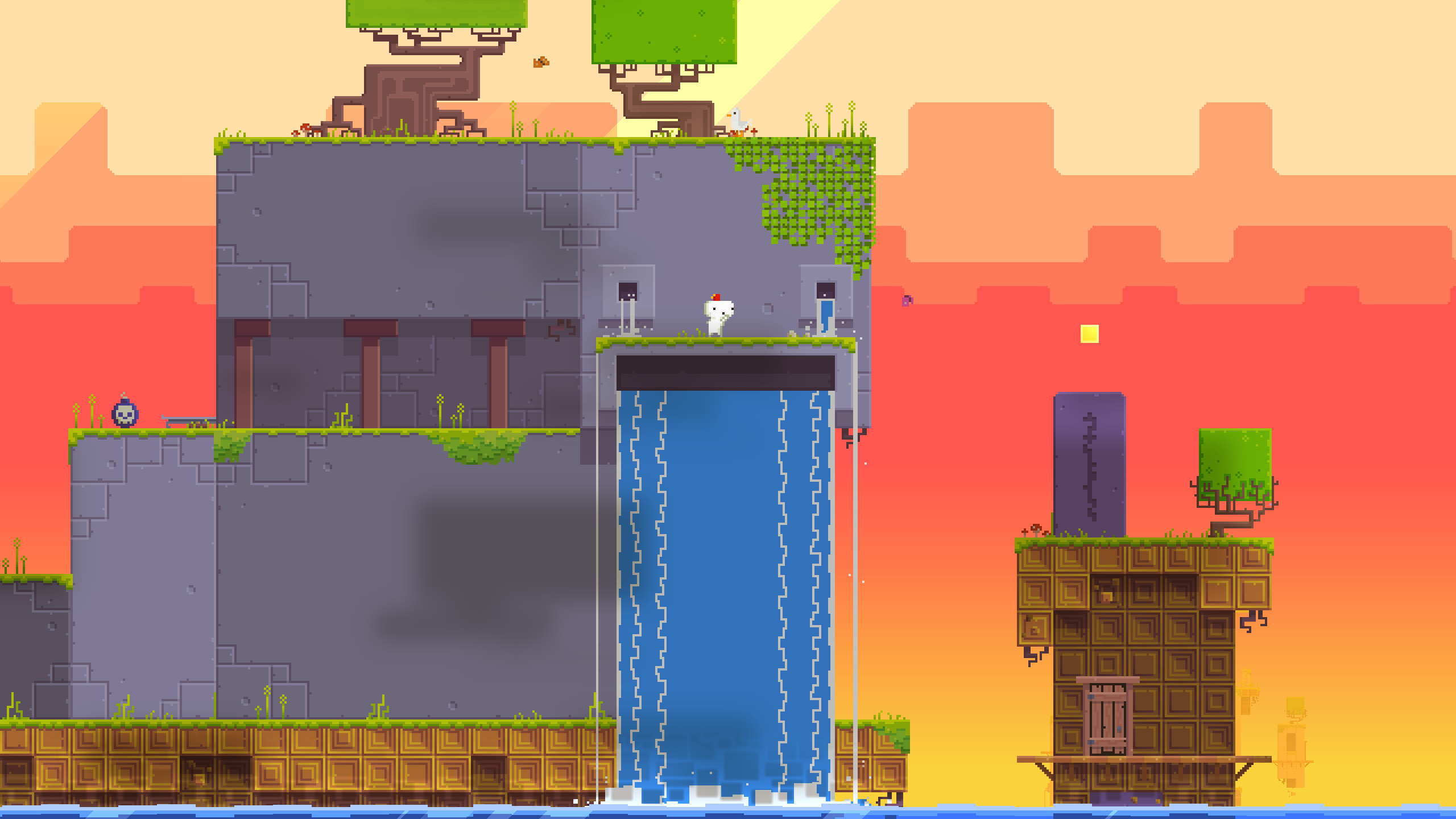
In Fez, the player-character hops between platforms to collect golden cube fragments in a variety of settings.

== Development ==
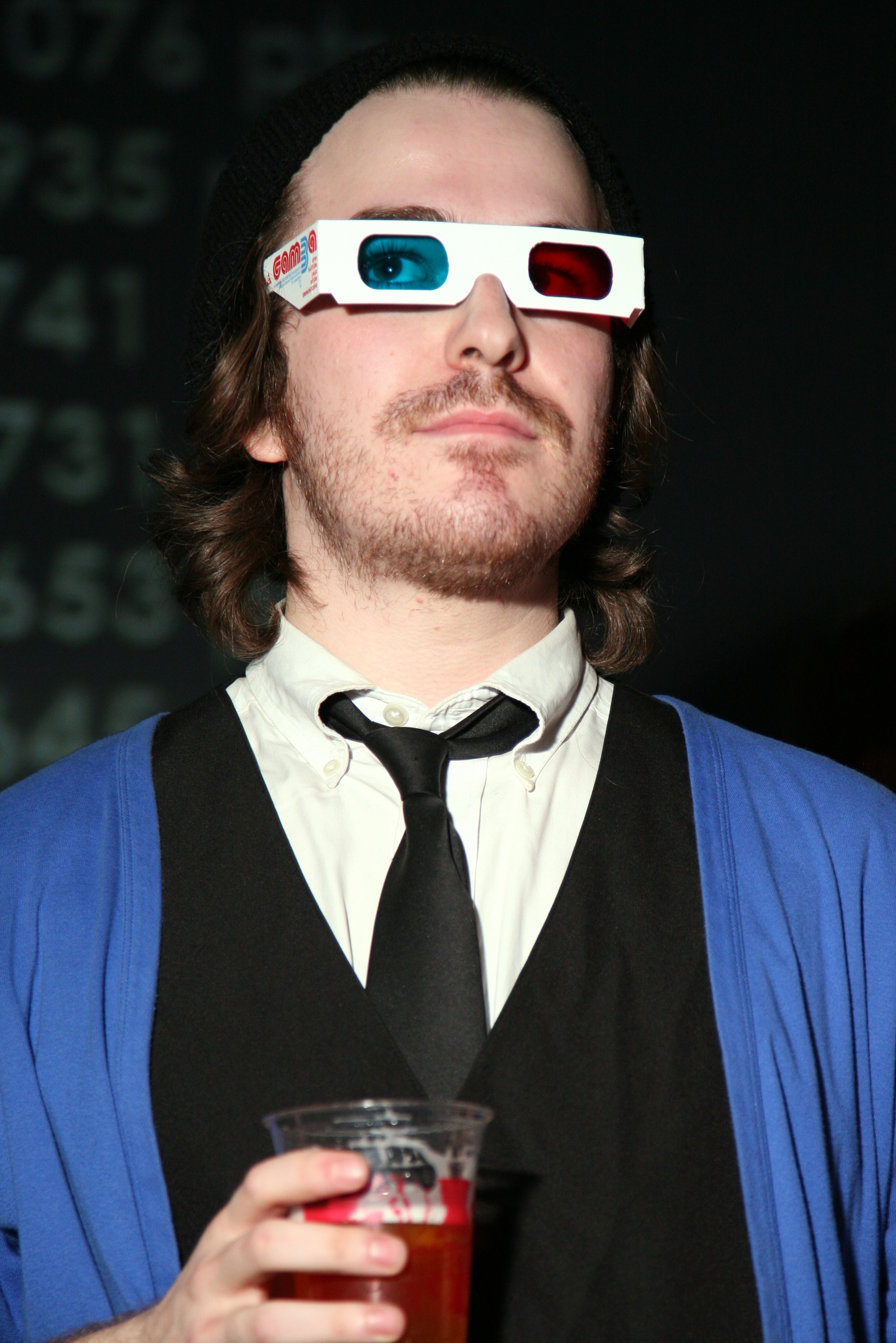
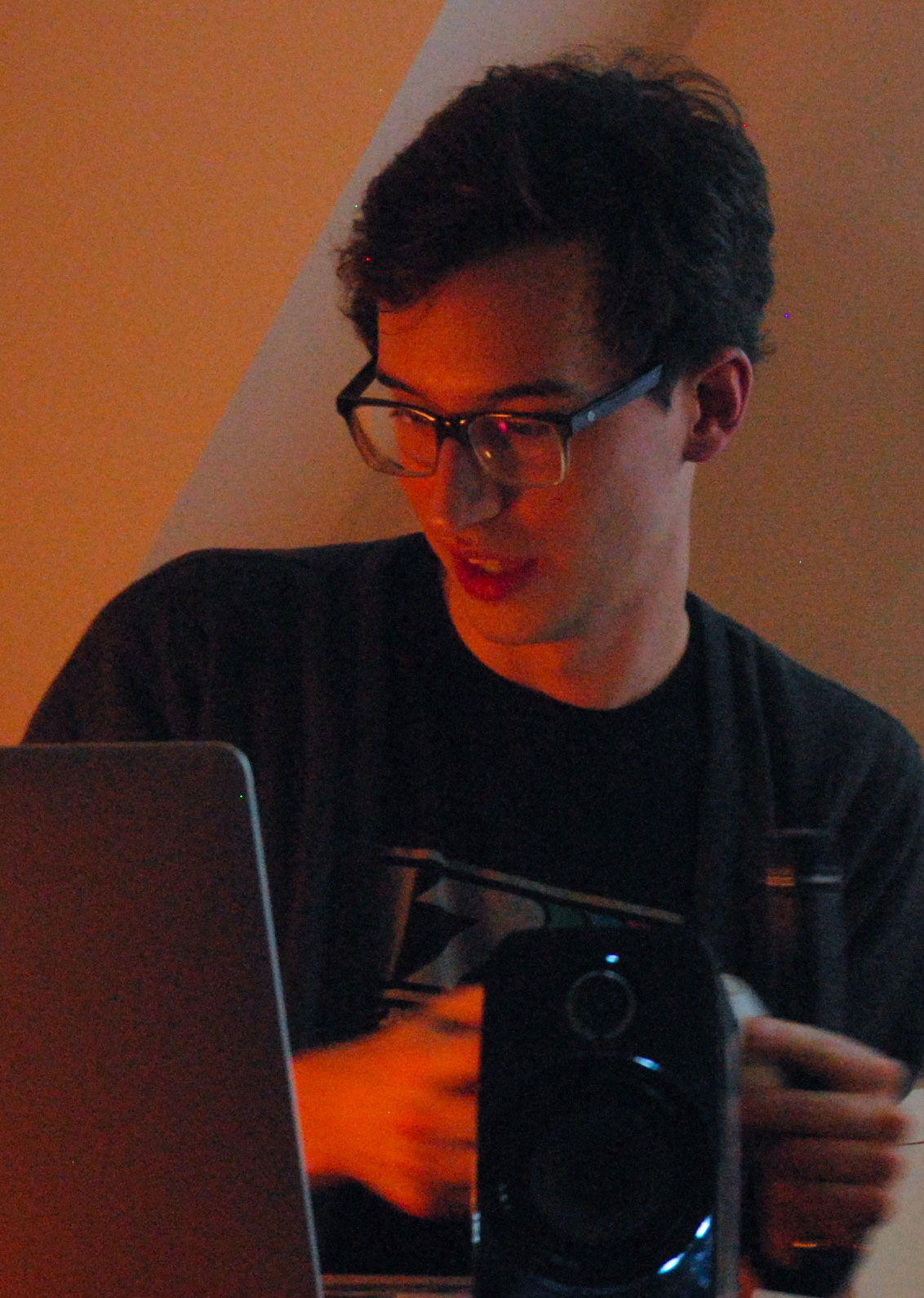
Fez designer Phil Fish and
programmer Renaud Bédard

Fez's five-year development cycle is known for its protracted length and amount of public exposure. Nathan Grayson of VG247 likened its rocky history to "an indie Duke Nukem Forever", and Polygon reviewer Arthur Gies noted its standing reputation as an "underdog darling of the indie game scene". Its designer, Phil Fish, became renowned in a way unusual for game developers due to his prominence in the 2012 documentary Indie Game: The Movie. Apart from Fez, which was released to wide acclaim, Fish himself became known for his outspoken and acerbic public persona.

Fez began as a collaboration between Canadian indie developers Fish and Shawn McGrath. They worked on McGrath's idea for a puzzle game in which a 3D space was viewed from four 2D angles. Although their partnership broke down due to creative differences, the entirety of Fez's design, story, and art descends from this game mechanic. (Note: Fish wanted to create a platform game with a pixelated aesthetic. After the split, McGrath made Dyad with his new company, ][ (Right Square Bracket Left Square Bracket).) Fish continued to work on the project in his spare time and solicited for a programmer on DeviantArt, where he found Renaud Bédard. Fez was first announced in July 2007 on The Independent Gaming Source. It was nominated for two awards at the 2008 Game Developers Conference Independent Games Festival (GDC IGF). When Fish's employer did not permit him time off to attend the awards, he quit. Fish later recalled this moment as "when [he] became indie". The game won "Excellence in Visual Art", and its presence created a surge of public interest in Fez that rode a concurrent swell of interest in indie game development as a whole. Fish received a Canadian government loan to open Polytron Corporation as a startup company and began full-time work on Fez. In July 2009, Polytron announced that Fez would launch in early 2010 as an Xbox Live Arcade exclusive. (Note: Fish designed Fez to be played "with a controller on a couch".) Development continued with an experimental spirit until the company ran out of money. Fish borrowed from friends and family to keep the company open and considered canceling the project before the nearby Québécois developer-publisher Trapdoor offered to help. Fish felt that the Trapdoor partnership rescued the game. (Note: Polytron itself became an indie game publisher in June 2014.)

At times it seemed as though the noise surrounding Fez might drown out the game's own voice ... There were the controversial outbursts from creator Phil Fish in the press; the rumours of vicious infighting during development; the endless delays and, of course, the big-shot movie documenting the struggling creator's days as his life fell apart around the game in painful slow-motion.

— Simon Parkin of Eurogamer on their 2012 Game of the Year

Fez won multiple awards in 2011 and was a "PAX 10" selection at the 2011 Penny Arcade Expo. Fish is shown preparing for Fez's booth at PAX East 2011, an earlier show, in the 2012 documentary film Indie Game: The Movie. The film chronicles the game development stories of several indie developers. As a subplot, the film presents Fish amidst a legal dispute with a former business partner that jeopardizes Fez's future. (Note: The former business partner, believed to be Jason DeGroot, is portrayed negatively and does not participate onscreen. The film's end credits were later corrected to reflect that the partner was not asked for input. An early trailer convinced Jason DeGroot to join the Fez development team as a producer and composer. He worked on Fez as far back as September 2007 and released demo tracks in late 2009, although he later left the project. The soundtrack was ultimately composed by Rich "Disasterpeace" Vreeland and the sound effects by Brandon McCartin, who were both on the project in 2010. DeGroot later worked on games including Dyad (with Shawn McGrath) and Sound Shapes.) Game Informer called Fish the film's "most memorable developer", and Rock, Paper, Shotgun wrote that Fish is portrayed as theatrical in a way that exacerbates his already outspoken reputation. Eurogamer said that the part when Fish resolves to kill himself if he does not release his game is "the film's most startling moment". Near the end of Fez's development, Fish told a Gamasutra reporter that he had received positive feedback from IGF Chairman Brandon Boyer and Braid designer Jonathan Blow, but that he felt "burnt out". The final game included almost none of the original work from the first two years of development. After several delays, Fez was submitted for certification in February 2012.

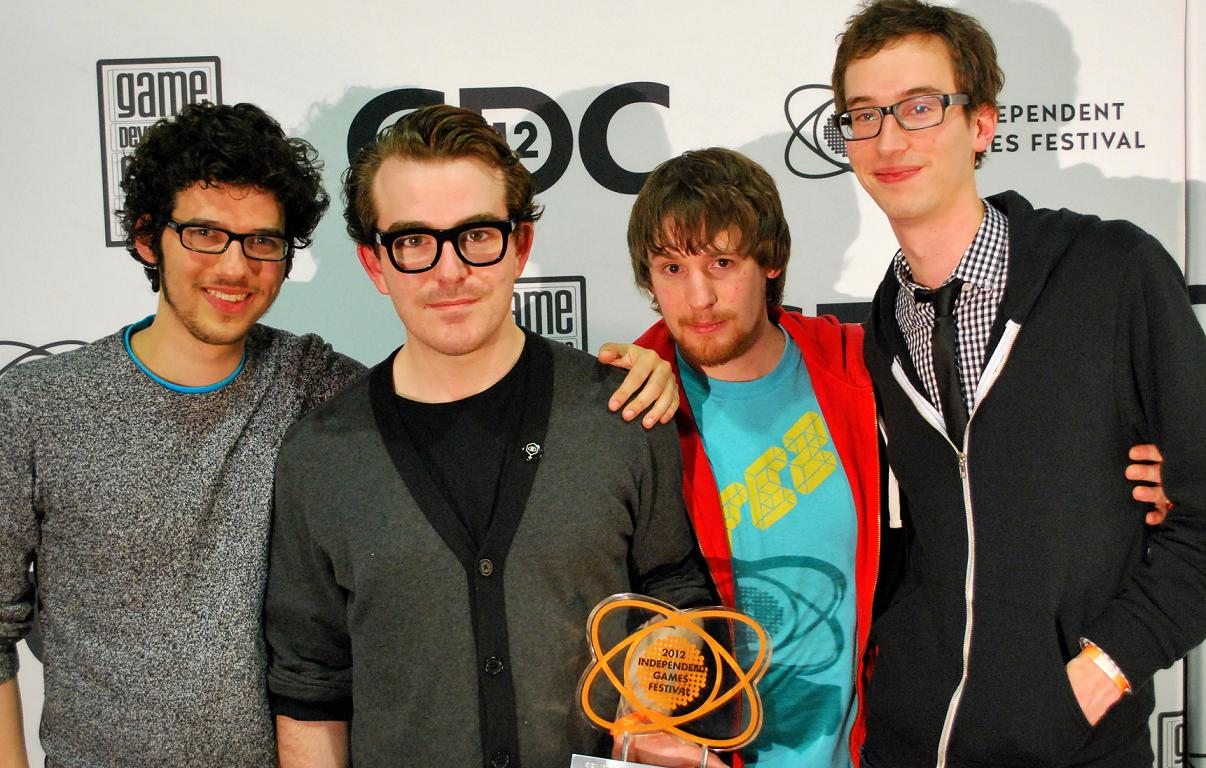
Fez development team at the 2012 GDC IGF (from left): composer Rich Vreeland, designer Phil Fish, sound designer Brandon McCartin, programmer Renaud Bédard

Fez was released on April 13, 2012, and sold 200,000 copies during its yearlong exclusivity to the Xbox Live Arcade platform. Fish rebuked Polytron's co-publisher, Microsoft Studios, for botching the game's release by way of lackluster publicity. Several months later, Polytron entered a high-profile dispute with Microsoft over the cost of patching Fez. (Note: Polytron had released a fix that resolved many of their technical issues but introduced another that corrupted the saved games for about one percent of users. They withdrew the patch, but found Microsoft's fee for subsequent patch releases unviable, and chose to reinstate the withdrawn patch as their most utilitarian option. Microsoft removed the fee a year later.) Nearly a year after Fez's launch, Fish announced a Windows PC port for release on May 1, 2013. OS X and Linux ports debuted on September 11, 2013, and PlayStation 3, PlayStation 4, and PlayStation Vita ports by BlitWorks debuted on March 25, 2014. (Note: The PlayStation releases include cross-console support for cross-buy (where one digital purchase allows access across multiple consoles) and "cross-save" (game save sharing between consoles), as well as support for 3D televisions, the DualShock 4 controller's decorative lightbar, and graphical upgrades due to the full port into the C++ programming language.) Ouya and iOS ports were also announced; the iOS release began development in April 2017 and was released in December 2017. No Android release was planned. Bédard stayed to port the Windows release before joining Toronto's Capybara Games. He credited Polytron's long development cycle to his own inexperience in game development (compounded by the team's small size and difficulty in setting reasonable milestones), the game's scope, and Fish's perfectionism. Fish had hoped that players would discuss Fez's nuances online after its release. Players collaborated online for a week to solve the final "monolith" puzzle by using a cryptanalytic attack known as brute force. Ars Technica described the apparent end to Fez's harder puzzles as "anticlimactic", but Fish told Eurogamer in March 2013 that hidden in-game secrets remain to be found.

More than three years after its digital launch, Fez received a physical release designed by Fish and limited to a signed edition of 500 in December 2015. The deluxe package included the soundtrack and a stylized red notebook with gold foil inlay. Though Bédard had moved on to another company, he continued to work on the game in secret. In August 2016, he released a final patch for the computer releases of Fez that included performance improvements, as a result of a unified codebase under an open source software library, and features such as a speedrun mode.

A Nintendo Switch version was released on April 14, 2021.

=== Design ===
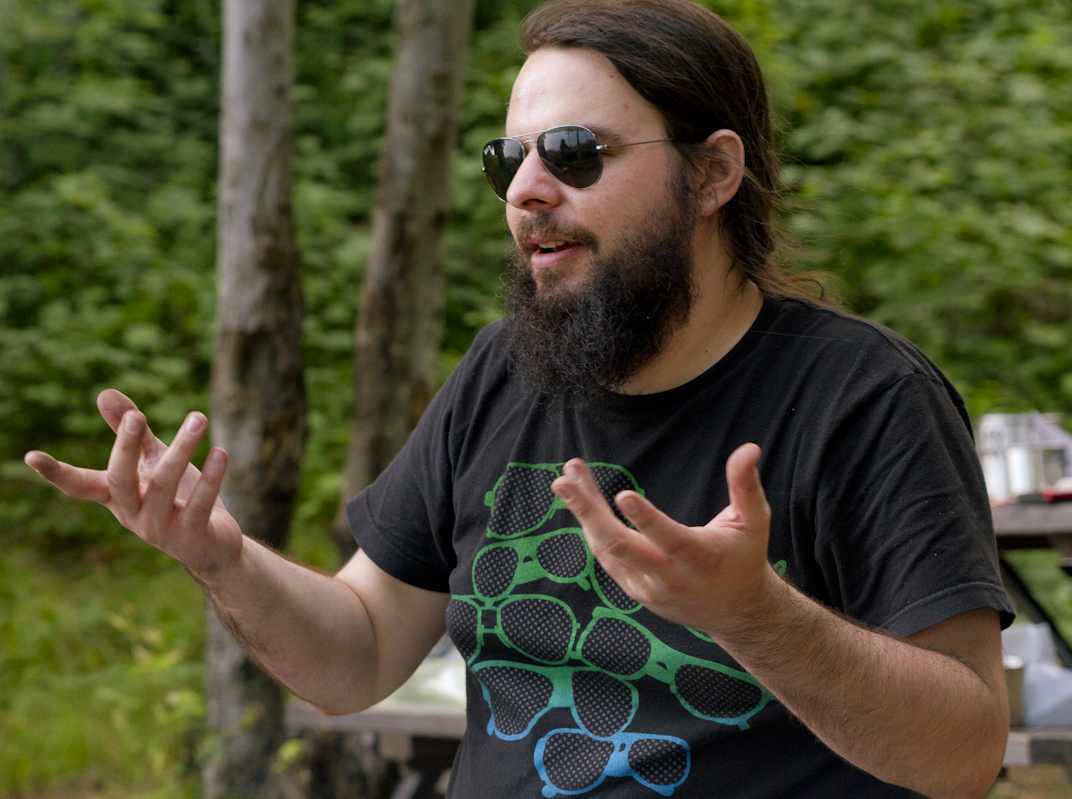
Indie developer Shawn McGrath (pictured in 2011) contributed the game's core mechanic, but left early in development.

Bédard wrote Fez in Microsoft Visual C# Express and XNA Game Studio Express. He coded the level editor and the game engine, Trixel, which converts 2D tiles ("triles") into four-sided 3D voxels ("trixels"). Fish made 2D pixel art in Photoshop for each side of the trixel, (Note: Fez had three different animators through its development: Paul Robertson of Scott Pilgrim vs. the World: The Game, who drew animals and some of Gomez's animations, Adam Saltsman of Canabalt, and Graham Lackey, who did some character animations.) which Bédard's custom software compiled into 3D game assets. Fish would then design levels in the level editor by extruding surfaces, a process he found "overwhelming" but akin to playing with Lego blocks. In their workflow, Fish first proposed ideas that Bédard would implement. The two would then discuss and fine-tune the addition—they worked well together.

The game came to adopt Metroidvania mechanics, with "secret passages, warp gates, and cheat codes". Fish cited Myst as an inspiration and compared its open world, nonlinear narrative, and "obtuse metapuzzles" to Fez's own alphabet, numeric system, and an "almost unfairly hard to get ... second set of collectibles". (Note: Fish originally fought the inclusion of an in-game map and the navigational assistant, Dot, but later changed his mind.) He was also inspired by the Nintendo Entertainment System games of his youth (particularly those of the Super Mario and The Legend of Zelda series), Hayao Miyazaki's signature "open blue sky", "feel-good" atmosphere, and Fumito Ueda's Ico. Fish sought to emulate Ico's feeling of nostalgic and isolated loneliness, and Ueda's development philosophy wherein all nonessential game elements are removed ("design by subtraction"). Fish made a personal challenge of designing a game without relying on "established mechanics". As such, Fez was always a peaceful game that never contained an antagonist.

=== Music ===
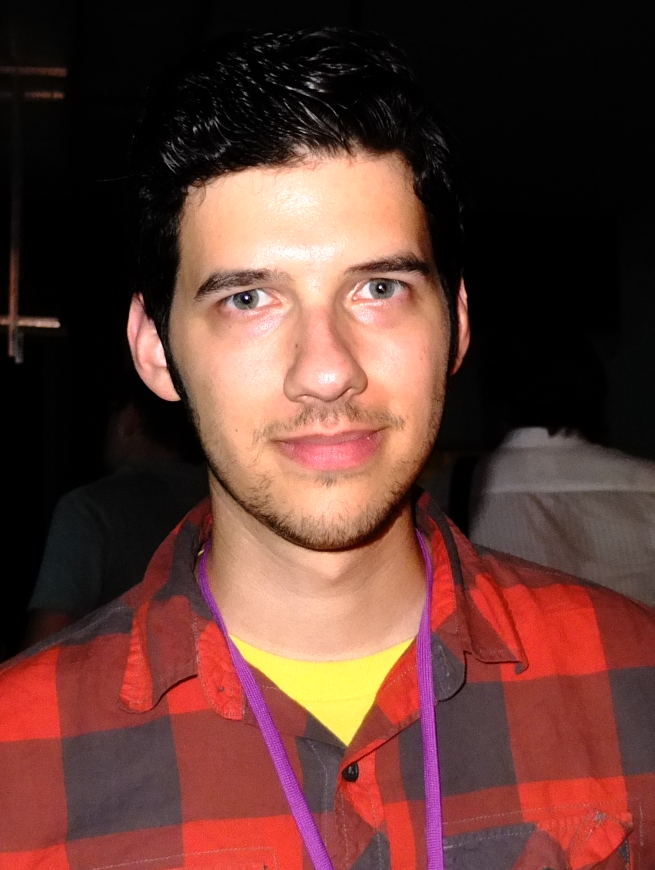
Composer Rich "Disasterpeace" Vreeland, 2012

"Trail", a medley by Disasterpeace from the Fez soundtrack remix album FZ: Side Z

Rich Vreeland, also known as Disasterpeace, composed the game's chiptune-esque electronic soundtrack. Despite his background in chiptune, Vreeland limited his use of that genre's mannerisms in the score. He worked with soft synth pads and reverb to push the score closer to a 1980s synthesizer sound. He also reduced reliance on percussion and incorporated distortion techniques like bitcrushing and wow. Vreeland opted for slower passages with varying tempos that could "ebb, flow, and breathe with the player". He left some portions of Fez without music. Vreeland worked on its soundtrack at night for about 14 months while scoring Shoot Many Robots. Brandon McCartin of Aquaria contributed the game's sound effects.

Vreeland's first composition for the game ("Adventure") became the soundtrack's first track. He wrote it after meeting Bédard but before discussing the soundtrack with Fish, and based the composition on Fez audio created prior to his arrival. Vreeland wanted to use tape recorders for their distinctive sound, but potential audio synching issues with this method led him to employ digital recording. Portions of the soundtrack dynamically change between several dozen constituent elements and react to the game environment. For example, the "Puzzle" track's elements change musical key based on the in-game time of day. Certain tracks were intended to imitate real-world sounds, such as those of bats, thunderstorms, taiko, and water falling from stalactites. Other tracks expanded from improvisations. Vreeland was also inspired by The Lord of the Rings Shire theme, 1980s horror media, the soundtrack of demoscene game Jasper's Journeys, the Legend of Zelda dungeon music, the Mass Effect soundtrack, Tangerine Dream, and Steve Reich. "Continuum" is a synthesized rendition of Frédéric Chopin's Prelude, Op. 28, No. 4. Instruments used in recording include the Sonic Charge Synplant, minimoog, "synthetic flute", and Boomwhacker.

The soundtrack was released in a digital format on April 20, 2012. Pre-orders for the soundtrack topped the Bandcamp charts. Kirk Hamilton of Kotaku wrote that Fez's sound effects evoked Jim Guthrie's Superbrothers: Sword & Sworcery EP audio. Janus Kopfstein of The Verge called the work "fantastic" and described it as a cross between a "1980s Vangelis synth odyssey" and a submerged vinyl record from an arcade. Game Informer's Matt Miller wrote that the soundtrack contributed to Fez's "80s Nostalgia vibe". Eurogamer described the music as "lush, spooky, and electrifying", and Edge compared it to "Holst put through a Mega Drive". Oli Welsh of Eurogamer wrote that the music matched the game's themes of "hidden depth". Welsh heard influences of 1960s English psychedelia (Pink Floyd, Soft Machine), 1970s Krautrock (Tangerine Dream and Kraftwerk), 1980s synth (Jean Michel Jarre, Vangelis), and Erik Satie. He added that the soundtrack's contribution to Fez was "incalculable". Damian Kastbauer of Game Developer used Vreeland's soundtrack to show that a retrogaming aesthetic in sound and visuals could be both "futuristic and nostalgic" and provide the "right 'voice' to support the game's design intentions".

Game Developer listed Vreeland in their 2012 Power 50 for his work on the soundtrack, which they described as "atmospheric, pensive, and maybe even a little bit melancholy". In keeping with Fez's theme of secrets, images visible only through spectrogram were embedded into the soundtrack audio. (Note: Spectrogram images include portraits of Harry S. Truman and Jesus, and a QR code of a list of years.) Vreeland released a remix album, FZ: Side F, a year later on April 20, 2013. It features tracks from other artists, including Jim Guthrie. Vreeland later released another remix album, FZ: Side Z, and all three albums were included in the August 2013 Game Music Bundle 5.

== Reception ==
Reception

Aggregate score
| Aggregator | Score |
|---|---|
| Metacritic | X360: 89/100; PC: 91/100; PS4: 90/100; VITA: 91/100 |

Review scores
| Publication | Score |
|---|---|
| Edge | 9/10 |
| Eurogamer | 10/10 |
| Game Informer | 9.25/10 |
| GameSpot | 8/10 |
| IGN | 9.5/10 |
| Polygon | 8/10 |
| TouchArcade | 4.5/5 |

Reviews upon Fez's original release were "generally favorable", according to review aggregator platform Metacritic. Later releases received "universal acclaim". Each release was consistently among the top-rated releases for each platform's year. While in development, Fez had won the 2012 GDC Independent Games Festival's Seumas McNally Grand Prize, (Note: Fez was also a finalist in Technical Excellence and an honorable mention in Excellence in Audio at the 2011 Independent Games Festival, as well as a finalist in Best Debut at the 13th Annual Game Developers Choice Awards in 2013.) the 2011 Indiecade Best in Show and Best Story/World Design, the 2011 Fantastic Arcade Audience Choice Award, and the 2008 GDC Independent Games Festival's Excellence in Visual Art. Eurogamer gave Fez their highest rating and named the "perfect, wordless sci-fi parable" their 2012 Game of the Year. Digital Spy listed Fez eighth in its Best Games of 2012, ahead of high-budget games like Call of Duty: Black Ops 2 and Halo 4. Fez was chosen as the 2012 game of the year by Diamond Trust of London developer Jason Rohrer and Halo 4 lead game designer Scott Warner. During the 16th Annual D.I.C.E. Awards, the Academy of Interactive Arts & Sciences nominated Fez for "Downloadable Game of the Year". The Windows PC port was Metacritic's tenth best-reviewed video game of 2013. Jake Kleinman of Inverse called it one of the best indie games of all time. Metacritic ranks Fez within its 500 best games of all time. (Note: Metacritic also ranks Fez among its top 100 highest-rated Xbox 360 games, top 100 PC games, and top 30 PlayStation 4 games.)

The New York Times called Fez Fish's "tribute to 1980s gaming ... lovingly, almost excessively, devoted to the golden age of Nintendo". Arthur Gies of Polygon described its aesthetics as "so retro it hurts", citing its pixelated look, chiptune soundtrack, and ways of clueing the player without explicit guidance. Gies felt that though "8-bit nostalgia" was outmoded, Fez showed an understanding of its influences and was the "most authentic" of the style. Jeremy Parish of 1UP.com called the game's minimalism "admirable" and likened its art style to that of Cave Story. Kotaku described Fez's nostalgic manner as "the video game aesthetic". Oli Welsh of Eurogamer lamented how "retro pixel art" became an indie game cliché during the game's development, but felt that Fez transcended such stereotypes through its dedication to the wonderment of early Nintendo titles. "Fish clearly worships the Nintendo of his boyhood", he wrote. Welsh likened Fez to a 1970s, peace-loving, surrealist version of 2001: A Space Odyssey as imagined by Shigeru Miyamoto, and foresaw its social status as "the darling of a certain indie clique" with "studied hipster cool". Edge described the game as "a place built from gaming's history", whose playfulness makes it "an unexpected heir to Super Mario Bros." with levels like well-crafted toys, and IGN's video review said the game "drags the 8-bit era into the future". Robert Purchese of Eurogamer called the game "timeless", falling in line with other Nintendo games.

No other game managed such coherence in 2012. No other game's voice could be heard so loudly over the din of the surrounding story.

— Simon Parkin of Eurogamer, December 30, 2012

Journalists likened Fez's rotation mechanic to the 2D–3D shifts of games like Echochrome, Super Paper Mario, and Crush. Early in development, Fish himself said that the idea is "nothing mind-blowing" and that the game could have been made "at any point in the last 15 years". Polygon's Gies preferred how Echochrome used the perspective mechanic, and Tom McShea of GameSpot considered Fez's mechanic a gimmick. Matt Miller of Game Informer thought that Fez realized the mechanic's potential better than other perspective-shifting games, and further commended Fez's puzzle design and pacing up until the endgame. Miller also compared its story to that of the novella Flatland, whose protagonist similarly discovers the complexities of another dimension. 1UP.com's Parish said that Fez's rotation mechanic was deeper than that of Super Paper Mario and not as dependent on M. C. Escher themes as Echochrome. Edge felt that the mechanic was "far less self-conscious" and "more harmonious" than in Echochrome and Crush. The magazine wrote that Fez's indoor puzzles were its best. Eurogamer's Welsh compared the game's "wraparound platforming" to the 1980s game Nebulus and described the rotation mechanic as among the console generation's "most unusual technical challenges".

Secrets of Rætikon took inspiration from Fez.

Reviewers commended the game's emphasis on discovery and freedom, but found its reliance on backtracking, particularly in the endgame, tedious. Parish of 1UP.com wrote that open-world action games like Metroid Prime all have these issues. Edge compared Fez's esoteric tricks to an older age of game development that packed games with Easter eggs, secrets, and codes, citing titles such as Exile and Jet Set Willy. The magazine also came to appreciate the 3D map. IGN's Mitch Dyer contrasted the game's riddles to the Metal Gear Solid codec frequency puzzle. (Note: The solution to the puzzle was printed on Metal Gear Solid's physical packaging.) Jeffrey Matulef of Eurogamer related his experience to the feeling of first playing the 1994 Myst, and The New York Times called Fez "a Finnegans Wake of video games" for its codebreaking that "makes the player feel like John Nash as portrayed by Russell Crowe in A Beautiful Mind". Game Informer recommended Fez for completionists who seek challenges. Polygon's Gies was uncertain as to whether the game's technical frame rate issues were intentional, and described this dilemma as having a "certain genius". Other reviewers noted its technical faults: Game Informer as minor, and 1UP.com as "easily the glitchiest game I've played on my 360".

Fez sold 20,000 copies in its first day, 100,000 in less than two months, 200,000 within a year, and, after the Humble Bundle, one million by the end of 2013. It was Xbox Live's 13th best-selling Arcade title of 2012. Fez was cited as an inspiration for 2014 indie games Monument Valley, Crossy Road, and Secrets of Rætikon, as well as later games Tunic and Animal Well.

== Cancelled sequel ==
Fez 2 is cancelled. I am done. I take the money and I run. This is as much as I can stomach. This isn't the result of any one thing, but the end of a long, bloody campaign. You win.

— Fez 2 cancellation post on Polytron's website

Fez 2 was announced as "one more thing" at the end of the June 2013 Horizon indie game press conference, held during the annual Electronic Entertainment Expo. The project was canceled a month later following a Twitter argument between Fish and video game journalist Marcus Beer. In an episode of the GameTrailers show Invisible Walls, Beer criticized Fish's response to questions about Microsoft's Xbox One self-publishing policy change. Fish replied on Twitter with condemnation for the industry's negativity and, in a final tweet, announced both Fez 2's cancellation and his exit from the industry. The news came as a surprise to the rest of Polytron, which has not commented on upcoming projects other than ports since the cancellation. Polygon listed Fish in their top 50 newsmakers of 2013 for the social power of his "caustic use of Twitter".

In a 2023 interview, Fish said his decision to cancel Fez 2 was primarily motivated by his lack of interest in a sequel rather than the argument with Beer. He described the argument as "an out" stemming from his frustration after Indie Game: The Movie made him a public figure and the obligation of trying to build on Fez's success by creating a sequel he did not care to make. According to Fish, no serious development or investment in Fez 2 beyond creating concept art had taken place, which made canceling it easy.
