= SuperHyperCube =

2016 video game

- Developer: Kokoromi
- Publisher: Polytron
- Platforms: PlayStation 4, Windows
- Release: PlayStation 4 October 13, 2016; Windows; November 7, 2017
- Genre: Puzzle
- Mode: Single-player

SuperHyperCube is a 2016 puzzle video game by Kokoromi and Polytron for PlayStation VR and SteamVR.

== Development ==
An early version of the game was distributed as freeware in 2008. The developers were inspired by science fiction films and the Light and Space minimalist art movement. The team canceled Oculus Rift support after revelations that Oculus founder Palmer Luckey had financially backed Nimble America, an organization backing Donald Trump's 2016 United States presidential campaign. SuperHyperCube had been previously announced as timed exclusive for PlayStation VR. It was a PlayStation VR launch title, released on October 13, 2016. The game was later released for HTC Vive headsets via SteamVR on November 7, 2017.

== Reception ==
Reception

Aggregate score
Aggregator	Score
Metacritic	PS4: 74/100

Review scores
Publication	Score
Destructoid	7/10
GameSpot	6/10
IGN	9/10

The PlayStation 4 version of SuperHyperCube received "mixed or average" reception according to review aggregator Metacritic, scoring 74/100, based on 15 reviews.
