= Dyad (video game) =

2012 video game

- Developer: Right Square Bracket Left Square Bracket
- Publisher: Right Square Bracket Left Square Bracket
- Designer: Shawn McGrath
- Composer: David Kanaga
- Platforms: PlayStation 3, Microsoft Windows, OS X, Linux
- Release: PlayStation 3: NA: July 17, 2012; EU: November 7, 2012; Windows; April 24, 2013
- Genres: Racing, Puzzle, Shooter, Music
- Mode: Single-player

Dyad is a downloadable game for PlayStation 3 and Microsoft Windows, though OS X and Linux versions were planned for a later release. It was developed and published by Canadian studio Right Square Bracket Left Square Bracket.

== Gameplay ==
Dyad is a "tunnel racing puzzle shooting" game that uses a number of new concepts to build upon a classic genre. The basic premise of the game revolves around momentum. By using the action button the player is able to pull themselves from one enemy to the next as they fly down the screen. This concept grows in complexity throughout its 26 levels from using combos to fill up a special meter, to being forced to rely on sound to differentiate icons on the screen.

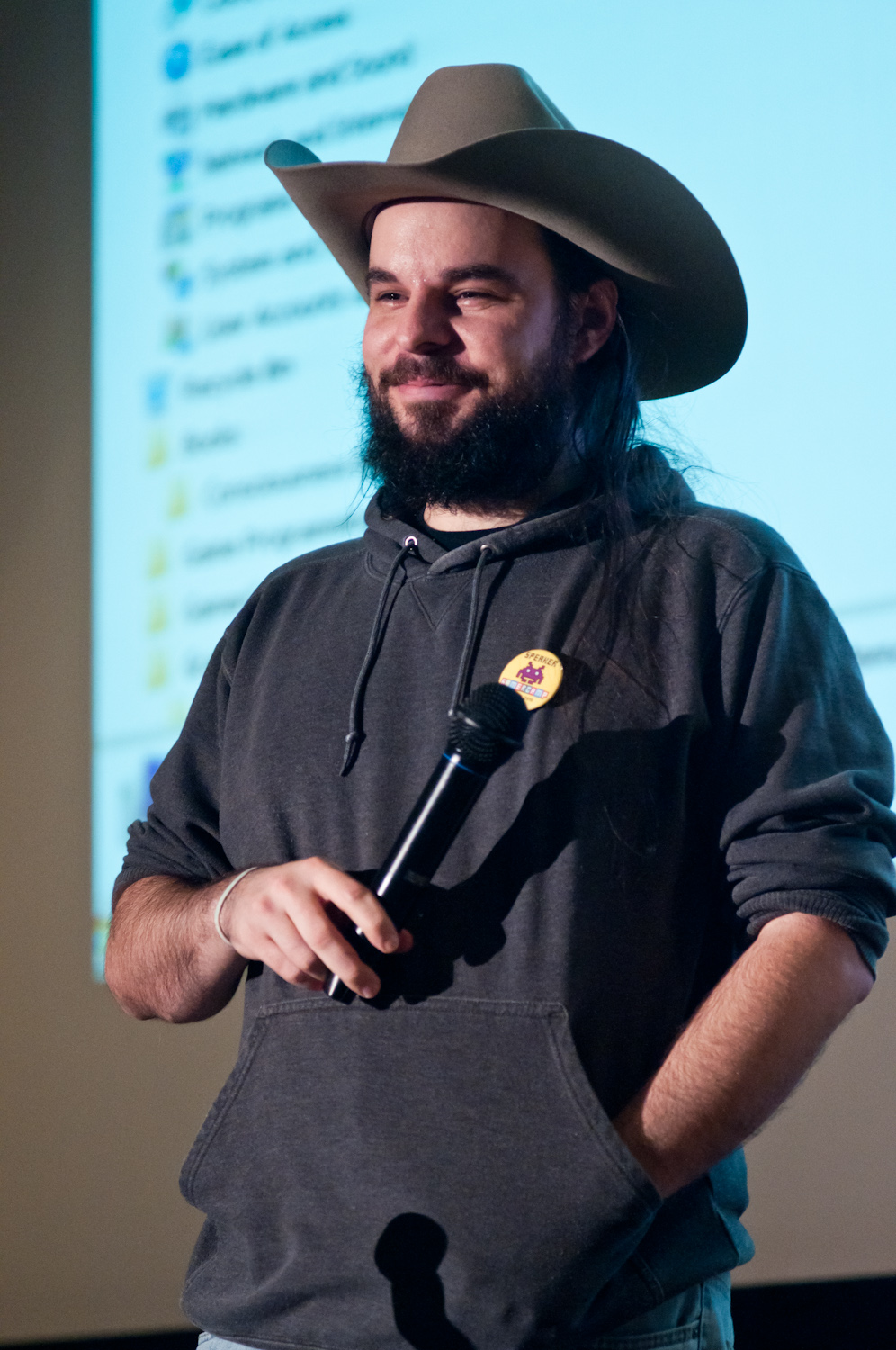
Indie developer Shawn McGrath

== Reception ==
Reception

Aggregate scores
| Aggregator | Score |
|---|---|
| GameRankings | 85.33% |
| Metacritic | 83/100 |

Review scores
| Publication | Score |
|---|---|
| Eurogamer | 8/10 |
| Game Informer | 8.25/10 |
| GameRevolution | 4/5 |
| GameSpot | 8.0/10 |
| GamesRadar+ | 4.5/5 |
| GameTrailers | 8.6/10 |
| IGN | 8.5/10 |
| Joystiq | 4.5/5 |
| The Verge | 9/10 |
| VentureBeat | 87/100 |
| PSX Extreme | 8.0/10 |
| Push Square | 8/10 |

Review aggregator website Metacritic gave the PlayStation 3 version of the game a score of 82/100 based on reviews from 33 critics, indicating "generally favorable reviews". Metacritic gave the PC version of the game a score of 80/100 based on reviews from 4 critics.

Dyad won the Audio Design award at IndieCade 2012.
