= Warp (2012 video game) =

- Developer: Trapdoor
- Publisher: Electronic Arts
- Engine: Unreal Engine 3
- Platforms: Xbox 360, PlayStation 3, Windows
- Release: Xbox 360; February 15, 2012; PlayStation 3, Windows; March 13, 2012
- Genres: stealth, Action, puzzle
- Mode: Single-player

Warp is a stealth video game developed by Trapdoor and published by Electronic Arts through its EA Partners program on Microsoft Windows, PlayStation 3 and Xbox 360. The game allows the player to warp through doors and objects and cause creatures in the game world to explode. It was released on February 15, 2012, on Xbox Live Arcade as part of the second "Xbox Live Arcade House Party", with PlayStation Network and Microsoft Windows releases to follow on March 13, 2012.

== Plot ==
The game opens from a first person view of the player being pulled out of what appears to be a cave by a group of scientists. The player's character, "Zero", is confused and dazed as they take him to a military-grade secure facility. Zero fades in and out of consciousness, and eventually awakens to see two scientists performing surgery on him and extracting a disk-shaped object.

Soon after, a fellow alien contacts Zero through telepathy and says that it can sense other aliens in the facility and that they should escape together. The scientists then put Zero through an obstacle course where Zero is reunited with the disk they extracted, giving him back his power to teleport. After reabsorbing the disk, the player's goal is to escape the facility and help any fellow aliens on the way out. The game has three endings:

Bad: Kill more than 170 humans. Zero heads outside in the rain, is depowered, and killed by a sniper.

Good: Kill fewer than 7 humans. Zero heading outside in the sun and running in victory, free at last.

Neutral: Kill more than 7 humans, but fewer than 170 humans. After escaping, Zero is ambushed by a small group of soldiers, but effortlessly slays them.

== Gameplay ==
Despite being a 3D game, the gameplay remains similar to a top-down 2D game that features puzzle solving and stealth.

The first power Zero acquires is the ability to teleport short distances, also known as the titular Warp. Zero is able to warp through open spaces, through objects, into objects, and into living things. The speed between warps is dependent on whether Zero moves into an object or into open space. Moving into open space gives Zero a slight timed penalty before it can warp again. From inside an object (or person), Zero can move around vigorously and eventually make it explode. This is known as a Frag.

Guards, scientists, and turrets attempt to stop Zero's escape. Upon sight of Zero both turrets and guards will attempt to shoot, while scientists will cower and run away. Once spotted by one human they will most likely alert other humans of Zero's presence. Alarms that are activated can be turned off by destroying the alarm coil or moving it off the alarm pad.

Sound and sight also play a prominent role in the game. Zero is about half the size of the average human and so is able to hide behind many objects that are scattered across the map without being seen. Sound will also alert the guards to Zero's presence. Footsteps, knocking into objects, and Zero's powers will create sounds audible to the human ears prompting an investigation, though many of these sounds can be made inaudible through upgrades.

Upgrades can be purchased at stations throughout the game. Upgrades cost grub energy that has been collected throughout Zero's journey. Grubs are small parasite-like creatures that cling to objects and give off a purple glow. This glow makes them easier to spot, although many of these grubs are located in hard to reach places and require extra skill or more powers to reach. Once a grub is found, Zero consumes it and absorbs its energy.

Zero will come across puddles of water early on in the game and discovers that being exposed to small amounts of water will nullify his powers temporarily. This is indicated by Zero having a sudden loss of color and a different walking animation. Unfortunately for Zero, the scientists also discover this weakness. They exploit this weakness by creating a malleable water substance that they primarily use as a shield. Zero can't walk, warp, echo, or use a hologram to get past these shields. When exposed to large quantities of water, Zero will die. The facility is located underwater.

Throughout the game, Zero will find remains of other aliens and will be able to absorb their old powers in order to aid his escape. The second power Zero unlocks is a solid hologram, known as Echo. Zero's echo ghost will move independently from him, but Zero is unable to move when this power is activated. All enemies can see Zero's echo but they can't tell it apart from the real Zero. If Zero's echo is killed, it will dissipate. The hologram can pass through all objects and move across gaps but will also dissipate when it comes into contact with water. The echo's movement is restricted to within a certain radius around Zero's position. When Zero activates this power inside an object, the hologram will take on the image and properties of the object. Guards, scientists, and turrets will only notice the object if it is not stationary. When Zero activates this power inside a person, whether the human is alive or dead, the echo will be of that person walking and enemies won't notice anything wrong.

The third power is known as Swap. This power is an extension of the echo and allows Zero's echo to swap places with an object of the player's choice. The swap power can be used as an extended warp in many situations. The power will only work when the end destination is an object. If Zero is inside an object while swap is used, the destination object will be placed inside the original object. This causes the internal object to destroy the external object and take its place. This technique can be used to destroy objects/humans and create distractions.

The fourth power is known as Launch. Launch allows Zero to fire an object at a high velocity. The launched object won't be affected by gravity during this time. Launch will only launch an object when Zero is already warped inside of it and will leave Zero in the position of where the object was launched from. This power is primarily used to destroy power generators to access different levels of the map. It can also be used to place objects strategically so Zero can use echo to cross large spaces that were previously unreachable.

== Game modes ==
There are two game modes featured in Warp. The first is the story mode where players spend their time solving puzzles and ultimately escaping from the facility. During the story, players can discover challenge orbs which can be activated by warping into them. Once Zero is warped into them, they are unlocked and accessible through the main menu.

The challenge mode places Zero in a training room and gives the player one objective. The rewards for completing these objectives are tiered: a bronze grub, a silver grub, and a gold grub. The bronze grub is always given for completing the objective and is the lowest tier of reward. The silver and gold grub is often given out in reward for completing the objective in shorter times respectively. These challenges are often placed in the story mode to help train the player for a new type of challenge/puzzle that is coming up. They often require critical thinking or advanced skills in order to attain the silver grub. The times that players complete the challenges are recorded and put up on a leader board to see how a player compares to others.

== Reception ==
Reception

Aggregate score
Aggregator	Score
Metacritic	(PC) 74/100 (PS3) 79/100 (X360) 72/100

Review scores
Publication	Score
Edge	8/10
Eurogamer	7/10
G4	3.5/5
Game Informer	6.75
GameSpot	6.5/10
IGN	8.5/10

According to the review aggregator Metacritic, the PlayStation 3 and Microsoft Windows versions of Warp received "generally favorable" reviews from publications upon release, while the Xbox 360 version received "mixed or average" reviews.

Daemon Hatfield of IGN scored the game an 8.5 out of 10. Hatfield's review was mostly positive, with his only problems with the game being its lack of polish, which he pinned down to lower production values, and ending levels. Even though Hatfield particularly disliked the final boss fight for being the "opposite of fun", he said that the game's level design and core mechanics make up for it by being "so much damn fun". Hatfield also spoke positively of the premise of being an alien against humans, rather than a human against aliens, the humour, and the difficulty balance.

GameSpot's Jeremiah Johnson was more critical of the game, summarizing his review by saying: "It's best to take Warp as the carefree fling it's likely meant to be, because anyone looking for a rewarding experience here will find only a charmingly warped vision of games we've seen many times before." Johnson praised the enjoyability of the puzzles, the "charming mix of gore and cuteness", the overall presentation, and the leaderboards. Johnson's main criticisms were concerning the controls and the "trial and error"-nature of some puzzles and encounters.

Game Informer's Dan Ryckert also had mixed feelings, stating: "Warp is charming at first, but the simple A.I. and basic puzzles aren’t enough to make it an XBLA standout. Completionists may find replay value in the collectible grubs, basic upgrade system, and challenge rooms, but anyone looking for deeper stealth or puzzle-based gameplay should look elsewhere." Ryckert scored the game a 6.75 out of 10.

Dan Whitehead for Eurogamer scored the game a 7/10 in his review and wrote: "The ideas at the heart of Warp are sound and, in general, the game is well paced and introduces its evolutions at just the right time. There's a looseness to the execution though, and it keeps the experience from becoming more than the sum of its parts. Warp is a pleasant enough diversion, but with patchwork design that remixes gameplay ideas and stylistic elements from sources as diverse as Splosion Man, Metal Gear Solid and Portal, it never gels into anything particularly memorable."
