= TouchTone (video game) =

2015 video game

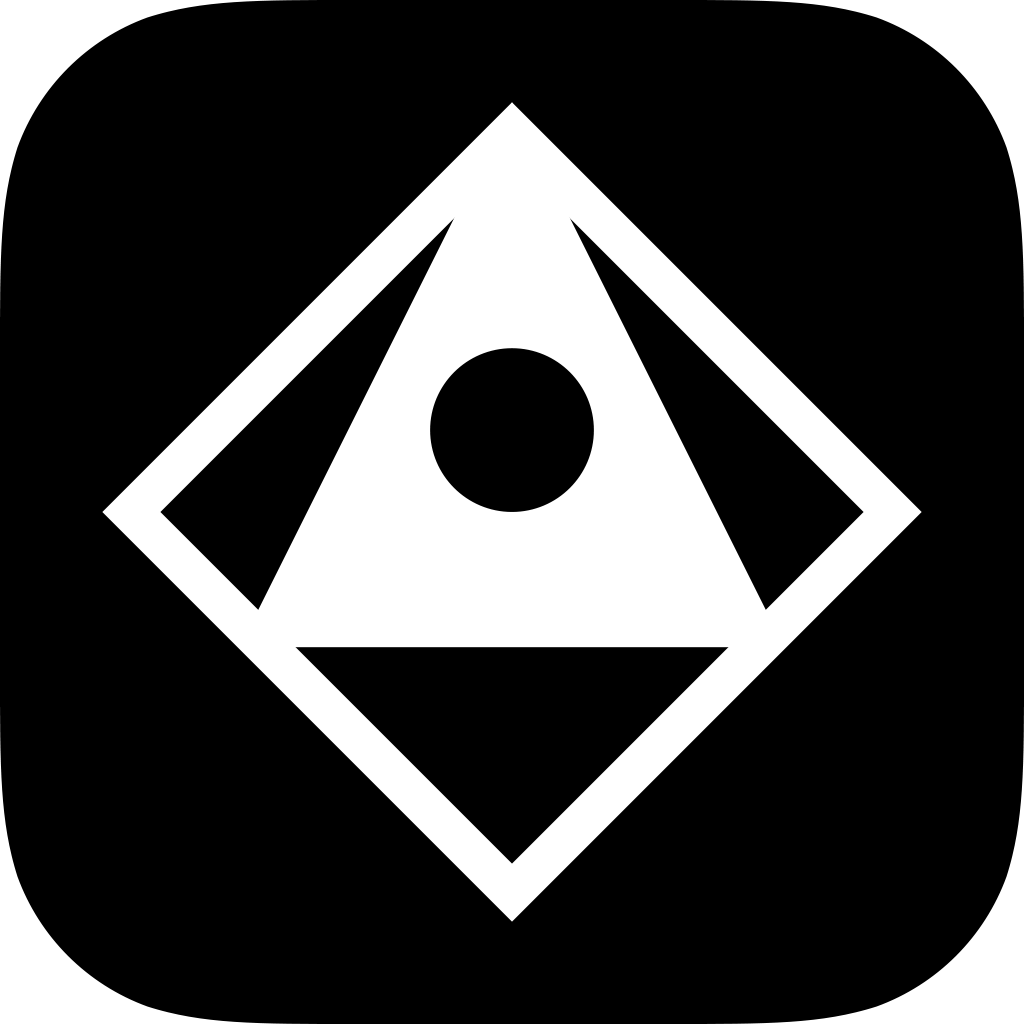
- App icon
- Developer: Mikengreg
- Publisher: Mikengreg
- Designer: Mike Boxleiter
- Artist: Greg Wohlwend
- Writer: Mike Boxleiter
- Platform: iOS
- Release: WW: March 19, 2015
- Genre: Puzzle
- Mode: Single-player

TouchTone is a 2015 puzzle video game developed and published by Mikengreg, a two-person indie game development team made up of Mike Boxleiter and Greg Wohlwend. The player monitors phone calls as part of a government surveillance program to find public threats. They unlock chains of emails by completing a series of puzzles in which a beam is reflected around a room to a set destination. TouchTone's core concept grew from a two-day game jam immediately following their 2012 release of Gasketball but only found its hacker theme following the mid-2013 global surveillance disclosures of Edward Snowden. The tone of TouchTone's story grew from satirical to serious over the course of the game's development.

The game was released on March 19, 2015, for iOS devices. The review aggregator website Metacritic characterized TouchTone's reviews as generally favorable. Critics praised the game's visual style and story but criticized the way the game did not allow players to skip puzzles. Reviewers found the light-bending puzzle premise unoriginal but appreciated its thematic connection.

== Gameplay ==
The player rearranges items to redirect a beam of light to its destination. Puzzles unlock emails which tell a about government surveillance (right).

As part of a government surveillance program, the player monitors phone calls to find public threats. Apart from infrequent interaction with their handler, the player is left to solve puzzles in pursuit of one such lead. The puzzles are based on the "reflection puzzle" popularized by role-playing video games wherein the player moves mirrors to reflect a beam of light about a room. In TouchTone, the player swipes the screen to move pieces that redirect incoming beams, symbolic of phone signals, into specific locations. The waveform beams are displayed in different solid colors and must be matched with the destination "node" of the same color by passing through moveable pieces that reflect and split the beam. The pieces do not move individually but as rows and columns in cardinal directions.

The levels are displayed in an overworld with a branching, tree structure. The player must pursue multiple branches to further the story. Optional, side-story branches do not advance the main plot but have the hardest puzzles. The story is told through chains of emails, which are unlocked by completing puzzles. The player assumes the role of an American Muslim National Security Agency agent who determines whether the hacked emails are pertinent to national security. The ethics of government surveillance are a core theme of the game.

== Development ==
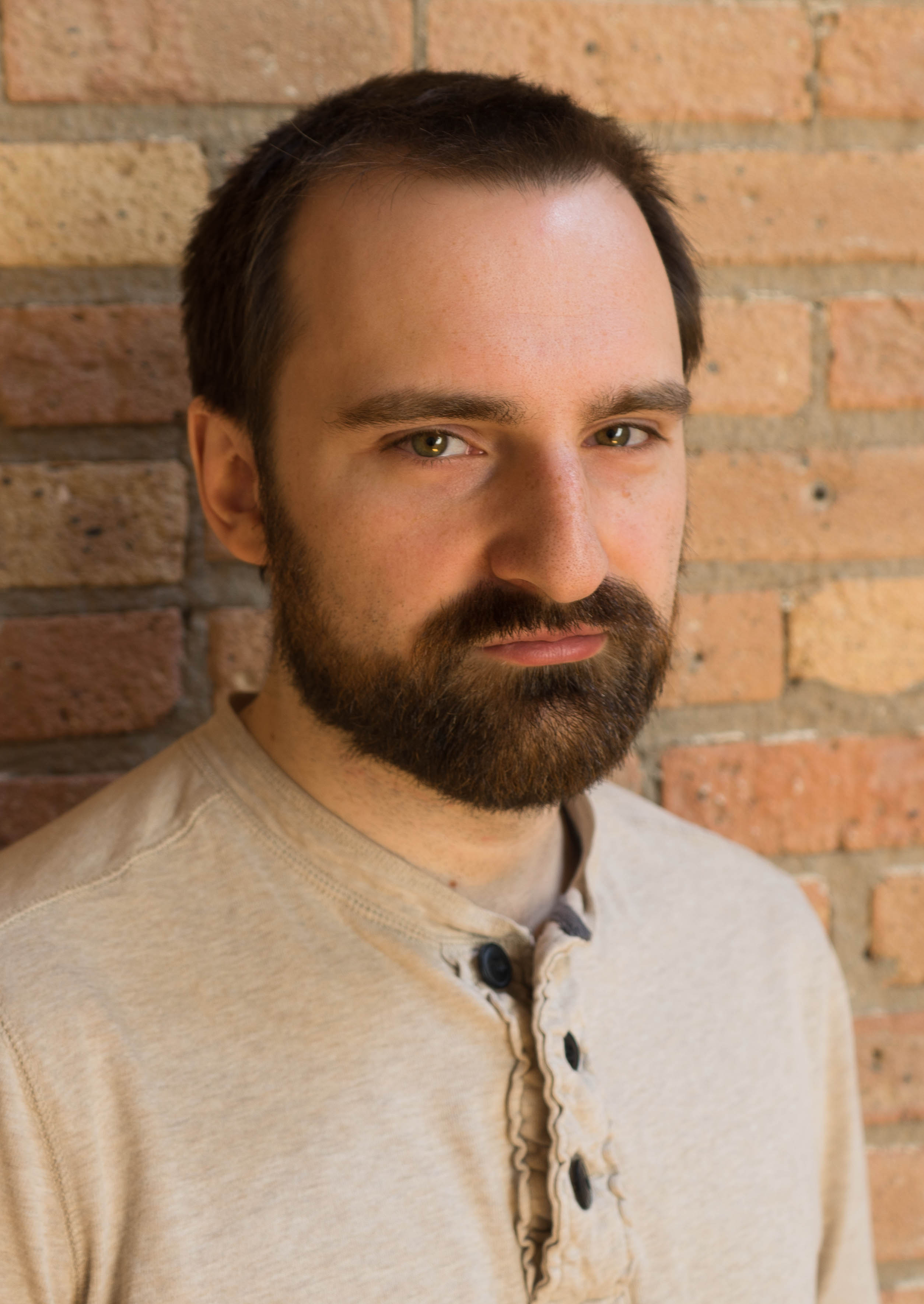
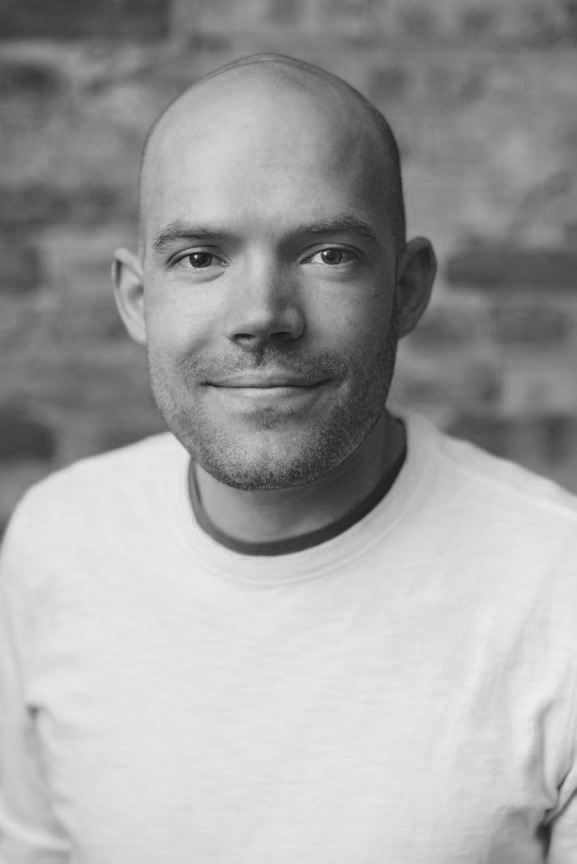
Mike Boxleiter and Greg Wohlwend

Mikengreg, an indie game developer duo of Mike Boxleiter and Greg Wohlwend, released the 2010 Solipskier and 2012 Gasketball together before TouchTone in 2015. After Gasketball's release, Boxleiter and Wohlwend planned a celebratory road trip to a game jam in Victoria, British Columbia. Gasketball turned out to be a "financial flop", and so Boxleiter wanted to use the jam to create "something new, ... something really small and perfect". By the end of the two-day jam, the core mirror reflection mechanics of TouchTone were in place, though it would take two years of sporadic work to finalize the remainder of the game. During this time, the two also worked separately, and Wohlwend released the well-received Threes with Asher Vollmer in 2014. Wohlwend tried to fit audio signal elements into TouchTone's nascent theme of light, lasers, and prisms. They felt this direction was unsuccessful, like a "boring Flash game", and that the game too closely mimicked "a hacking minigame from a bigger AAA game like BioShock or System Shock".

TouchTone found its theme following the Edward Snowden global surveillance disclosures in mid 2013, as Mikengreg felt they could provide satirical commentary through the "hacking" element of the game. The story shed its jocular tone as it and its political content grew deeper and more serious. Boxleiter wrote most of the script, which totaled over 20,000 words in length. It was his first effort at professional writing, and it took him five months. He and Wohlwend would conference after each chapter for coherency. Boxleiter wanted the story to explore the "questions ... floating around the national consciousness" rather than be "heavy-handed" and prescriptive. Despite this work, Boxleiter felt that the story and the gameplay "don't necessarily interact with each other", with the story serving to drive those less interested in puzzles through the rest of the game. They playtested the game in public at the theater in Logan Square, Chicago, though they acknowledged difficulty in playtesting the story's private experience. Mikengreg decided against including an option to skip puzzles, which they felt would spoil the game and the player's capacity to adapt to increasing difficulty. They attribute this game design philosophy to Derek Yu of Spelunky.

TouchTone was released as an iOS universal app for both iPhone and iPad on March 19, 2015. It received a front page feature on the iOS App Store upon its release.

== Reception ==
Reception

Aggregate score
| Aggregator | Score |
|---|---|
| Metacritic | 84/100 |

Review scores
| Publication | Score |
|---|---|
| 148 Apps | 4/5 |
| Gamezebo | 5/5 |
| Pocket Gamer | 8/10 |
| TouchArcade | 4/5 |

TouchTone received "generally favorable" reviews, according to video game review score aggregator platform Metacritic. It received Pocket Gamer's silver award.

Reviewers praised the game's aesthetics and criticized its unoriginal puzzle concept. TouchArcade's Shaun Musgrave wrote that the game's "striking" visuals and "politically charged" message were not completely reconciled but were "individually strong". He described its art style as similar to Wohlwend's previous work and its political statement as indicative of Mikengreg's strong opinions. Musgrave praised the game's writing but thought the actual puzzles were weaker. 148Apps's Jordan Minor found the "clinical, minimally-colored cyberspace" and 1970s thriller film aesthetic "chillingly appropriate" for the theme's tension. He also chided the puzzles for not being "a reward unto themselves" and the gameplay's "monotony" for being similar to that of Papers, Please without serving the same dehumanizing point. Minor called TouchTone "essentially a series of the hacking minigames ... [from] BioShock, Deus Ex, or Watch Dogs." Pocket Gamer's Craig Grannell appreciate how the game "often forces a kind of upside-down thinking" and compared its message to that of Blackbar. Gamezebo's Jim Squires said that TouchTone is "perfectly designed for a certain set of mobile gamers" and compared its gameplay to the 1987 Deflektor. Despite the game's similarity to "countless light-bending puzzle games", he found Mikengreg's implementation "fiendishly clever" in the way the player moves rows of tiles rather than one at a time.

Reviewers did not like the inability to skip puzzles. Musgrave wrote that moments of being "stuck on a mandatory stage" detracted from the player's investment and sense of immersion in the story. Grannell of Pocket Gamer wrote that TouchTone's linearity was its "only downside", though he also wished for options to "undo" mid-game choices and to save puzzle progress upon leaving the game. Multiple reviewers appreciated the game's story. Wired's Kyle Vanhemert felt that the act of determining whether messages were pertinent to national security was a "powerful experience". Squires of Gamezebo considered the story one of the game's strong points, and unusually so for a puzzle game. He wrote that there was sufficient "intrigue" to want to finish the story, and that the reward of more story encouraged him to get through the harder puzzles.
