= Greg Wohlwend =

American video game developer

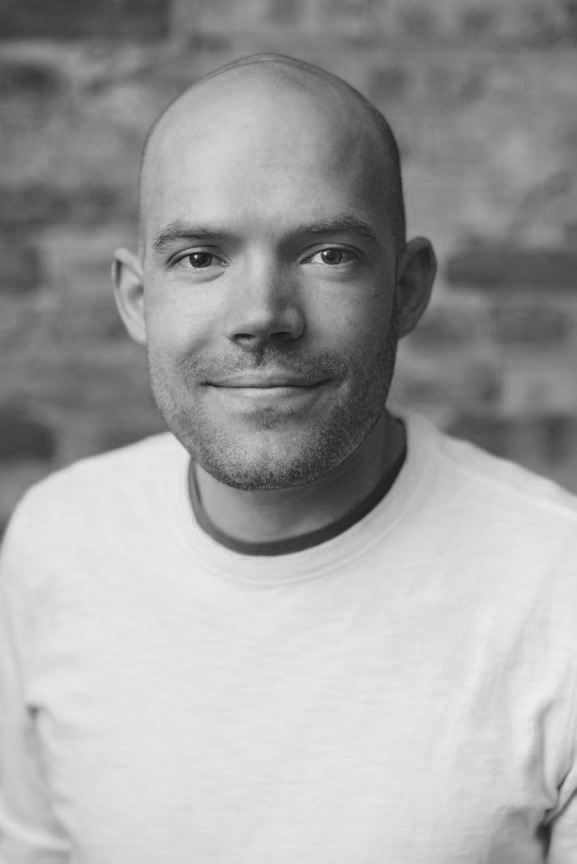
- Education: Iowa State University
- Occupations: Video game artist and developer
- Known for: Threes! Ridiculous Fishing; TumbleSeed; Hundreds; Gasketball; Puzzlejuice; Solipskier

Greg Wohlwend is an American independent video game developer and artist whose games include Threes! and Ridiculous Fishing. He originally formed Intuition Games with Iowa State University classmate Mike Boxleiter in 2007 where they worked on Dinowaurs and other small Adobe Flash games. Trained as an artist, Wohlwend worked mainly on the visual assets. As Mikengreg, they released Solipskier (2010, iOS), whose success let the two take a more experimental approach with Gasketball, which did not fare as well. At the same time, Wohlwend collaborated with Asher Vollmer to make Puzzlejuice, and with Adam Saltsman to make Hundreds based on Wohlwend's first game design. He later released Threes! with Vollmer in 2014 to critical acclaim. His later games TouchTone and TumbleSeed were also the products of collaborations. Wohlwend was named among Forbes' 2014 "30 under 30" in the games industry.

== Career ==
Animation of app icons designed by Wohlwend

Wohlwend studied graphic design at Iowa State University and graduated in 2008. He has described his aesthetic as "simple and elegant", and has said about his practice that he is not good at character design and that he prefers to work with vector file formats in Adobe Illustrator so that the images can work at all resolutions. Wohlwend also feels that creativity is a skill that is cultivated and not inborn. He has been influenced by his lifelong experience playing video games, and his favorite game is Baldur's Gate II: Shadows of Amn. His writings on the lifestyle required for indie development have been noted by games journalists. Wohlwend was named among Forbes' 2014 "30 under 30" in the games industry.

=== Intuition and Mikengreg ===
Wohlwend met Mike Boxleiter in an experimental video game development class they took together at Iowa State University. Wohlwend had attempted to help Boxleiter with a project, but quit after drawing a few aliens. They met again as coworkers at the university's Virtual Reality Application Center during Boxleiter's final year of college. Upon discovering their close interests, they began to work on an Adobe Flash game named Dinowaurs while they completed college. So as to make money while they worked on the game, they founded Intuition Games at the university's Research Park around May 2007. They decided to stay in Ames, Iowa due to its financial feasibility and local connections, but two other team members (friends from Iowa State) lived farther away. They saw Flash games as an easy entry point into full-time self-employment, but planned to eventually work on console platforms such as WiiWare.

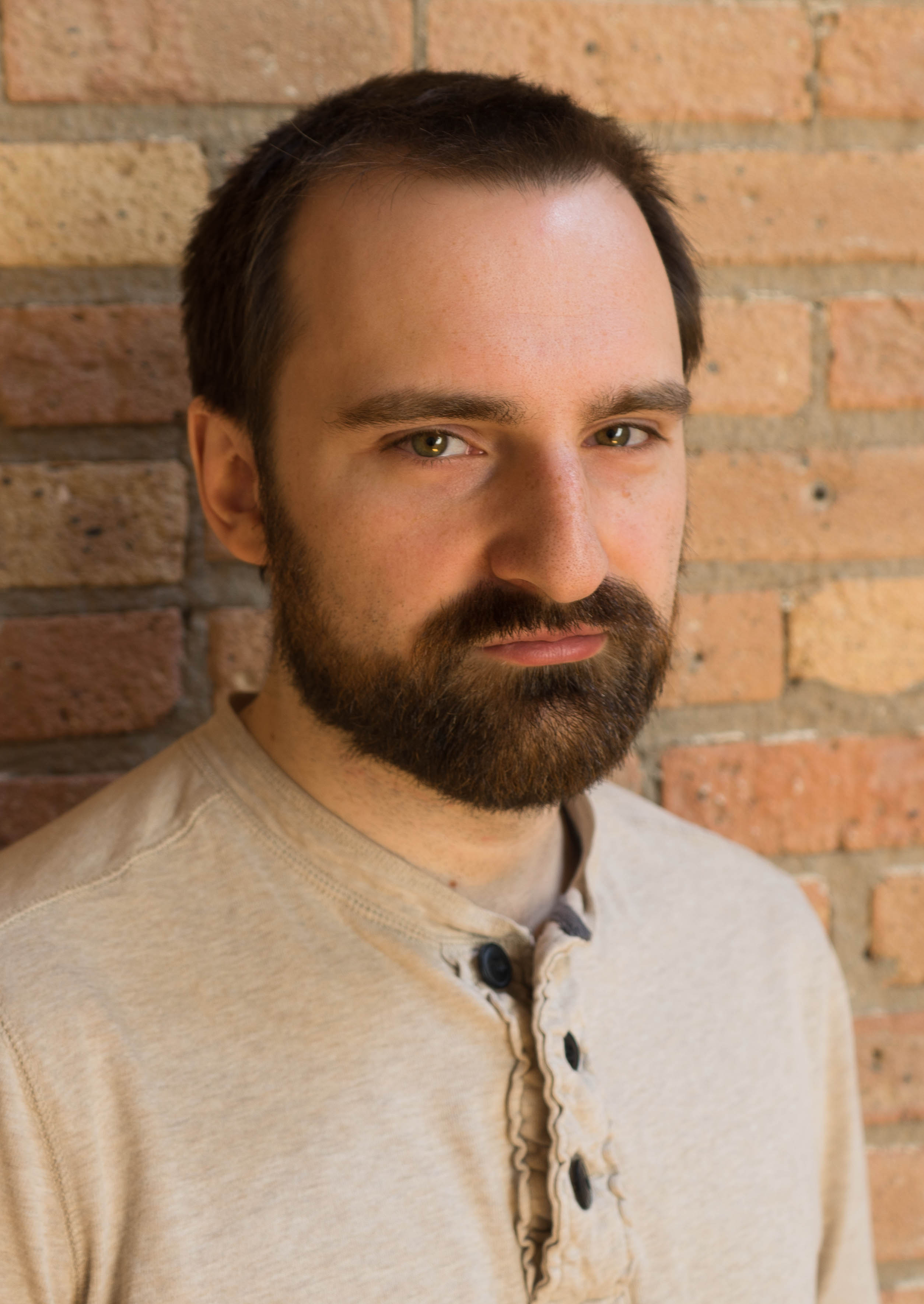
Boxleiter

In their development process, Boxleiter and Wohlwend both proposed and worked on each other's ideas, and would drop the ideas they found unexciting. Wohlwend said they often argued over aspects of their games, which he found normal and natural. Their labor as a team was divided in that Wohlwend always did the art and Boxleiter the programming, as reflective of their skills at the time. The pair agreed to an assessment of their partnership as "left-brain right-brain", and saw the majority of their joint work as "editing". Aside from the business aspects, they were grateful to have the "creative freedom" to do their own work. Wohlwend appreciated the benefits of not doing contract work, but struggled with the relative "isolation" of having few colleagues, a low salary, and job instability. He disagreed with the "cinematic action games" he saw to be popular at the time and hoped to contribute more compelling ideas to the young industry. They thought of themselves as artists and of their work as experimental. Boxleiter and Wohlwend worked long hours when making the Flash games, which they found exciting and unsustainable. At Intuition, they worked on games such as Dinowaurs, Gray, Fig. 8, and Lifecraft and participated in at least six game jams. As of April 2010, they had created 10 games together.

Intuition's first game, Dinowaurs, is a Flash-based strategy and action game where two players compete as dinosaurs to seize the most cavemen settlements so as to upgrade their own capacity and eventually kill the other dinosaur. It features online matchmaking. The concept came from one of Boxleiter's unfinished projects and another Intuition member's drawing of a stegosaurus with a jetpack. The team was funded then-new Flash site Kongregate by November 2007 as one of the first five games for Kongregate platform. It was finished in two years for a 2009 release. IndieGames.com reported mixed reviews from players.

Their later games would only take a few months each, in comparison. They abandoned the use of design documents after Dinowaurs, and instead chose to refine and experiment in process. Intuition released Effing Hail and Gray around April 2009. Players in action game Effing Hail control hail and wind to destroy the most buildings and midair objects within a time limit. The game was published through Kongregate. In Gray, players control a single character and try to end a riot by influencing other individuals in the crowd. The game was featured at IndieCade in 2009. In the case of Fig. 8., Wohlwend thought of the idea based on a college art project. In the project, Wohlwend followed a bike trail in the snow, metaphorically related it to the tribulations of romantic relationship, and made an art installation involving a bike spray-painted black with two errant red and blue tracks painted on the floor. The concept went unused on their whiteboard for four months until they needed an idea, whereupon Boxleiter added game mechanics to the visuals. In their next game, Liferaft, the player-character is a young woman set to escape "a post-apocalyptic sci-fi ... test chamber", with core gameplay that revolves around a "Bionic Commando-style grappling hook". Wohlwend used a 16-bit era graphics style. They sought crowdfunding from Kickstarter, but later canceled and put the project on hiatus in October 2009.

In March 2010, and under the moniker Mikengreg, Boxleiter and Wohlwend's 4fourths was selected for Kokoromi's Gamma IV showcase. Based on the showcase's "one button game" theme, four players control two spaceships using one button apiece to cooperatively destroy enemy ships. It was Michael Rose of IndieGame.com's favorite game of the Gamma IV selections, was later displayed at the 2010 Game Developers Conference and in Brandon Boyer's 2011 Wild Rumpus event.

Mikengreg announced Liferaft: Zero and Solipskier in November 2010. The former is a "prequel teaser" to Liferaft: a game of trial-based challenges with wall-jumping and grappling wherein girl clones attempt to swing and jump around test chambers to reach and ring a bell. Wohlwend and Boxleiter made the shorter version to limit the scope creep of the overall project. IndieGames.com named the Flash game their third best browser platformer of the year. Their other game, 4fourths, was put on hiatus for lack of resources. They were interested in making games outside the Flash market.

=== Solipskier ===
Wohlwend's Solipskier high score run

Their first game as Mikengreg was the sport-inspired Solipskier, where the player's finger draws the ground for the on-screen skier to pass through a level filled with gates, tunnels, and walls. It was designed as a Flash game, which set the limitations for its mechanics. The game concept came from a brainstorming session about parallax scrolling, and was revised in fits of creativity. They paired the parallax scrolling with speed and began to prototype. Wohlwend saved the skier's character design for last since he felt it was his weakest area. Mikengreg then decided to develop for iOS in addition to Flash, and to release both versions simultaneously. It was released simultaneously for Kongregate (Flash) and iOS on August 29, 2010. Solipskier became their first game to receive public appreciation. The iOS version made around $70,000 in its first two months (as compared to $15,000 from the Flash release), which gave them enough stability to branch out into non-Flash platforms.

=== Gasketball ===
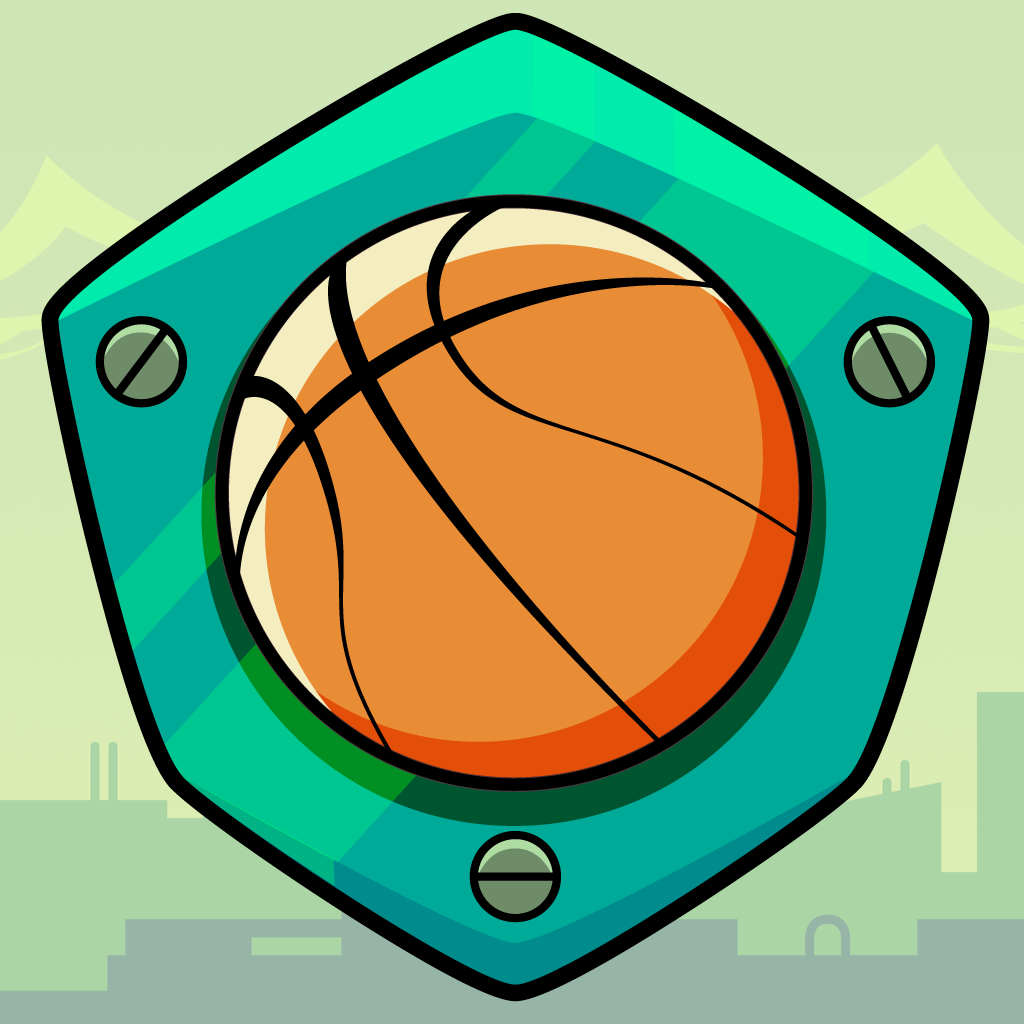
Gasketball icon

Riding the earnings from Solipskier, Mikengreg continued to pay themselves their same salary but now had the means to try new ideas. Wohlwend estimated that they discarded about six "fairly polished prototypes" over the development of their next game, Gasketball. They were able to live on $20–25,000 a year each in Iowa for the next two years while working on the new game. Wohlwend made somewhat more income due to other collaborations, such as Puzzlejuice with Asher Vollmer, but shared his income with Boxleiter. Even though Solipskier was successful, the duo did not have a following comparable to indie developers like Team Meat and thus felt like their external pressure was low. Instead, their pressure was internal. Wohlwend said he worked 100-hour weeks with no weekends or vacations while living off of the Solipskier funds. In making Gasketball, Boxleiter and Wohlwend felt that their game quality had improved continually, but found the idea of a million-person audience "daunting". Wohlwend questioned whether he could even recreate Solipskier's success. When they ran out of money, Boxleiter borrowed money from his parents, and eventually they both went homeless, living off of the couches of friends.

Gasketball was released for iPad on August 9, 2012. They had decided to release the game as an ethically non-coercive free-to-play game, with a free base game and in-app purchases for the extended content. Not as many players paid for the content as expected. This was due, in part, to the players' difficulty in finding the purchase function. The game had been downloaded 200,000 times in its August 2012 launch week and was briefly ranked near the top of an iTunes top downloads ranking, though it did not break the top 200 grossing chart.

=== Puzzlejuice ===
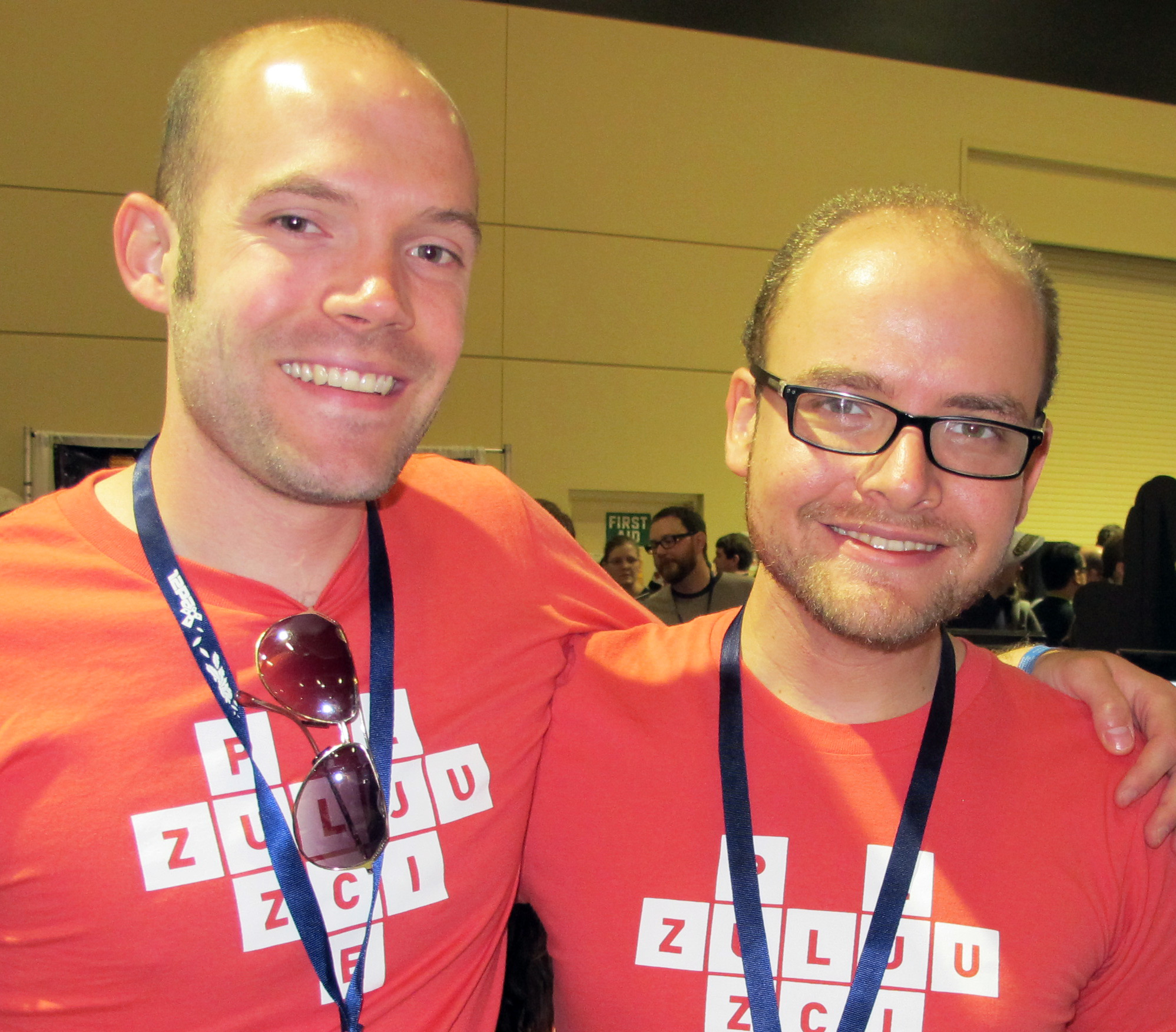
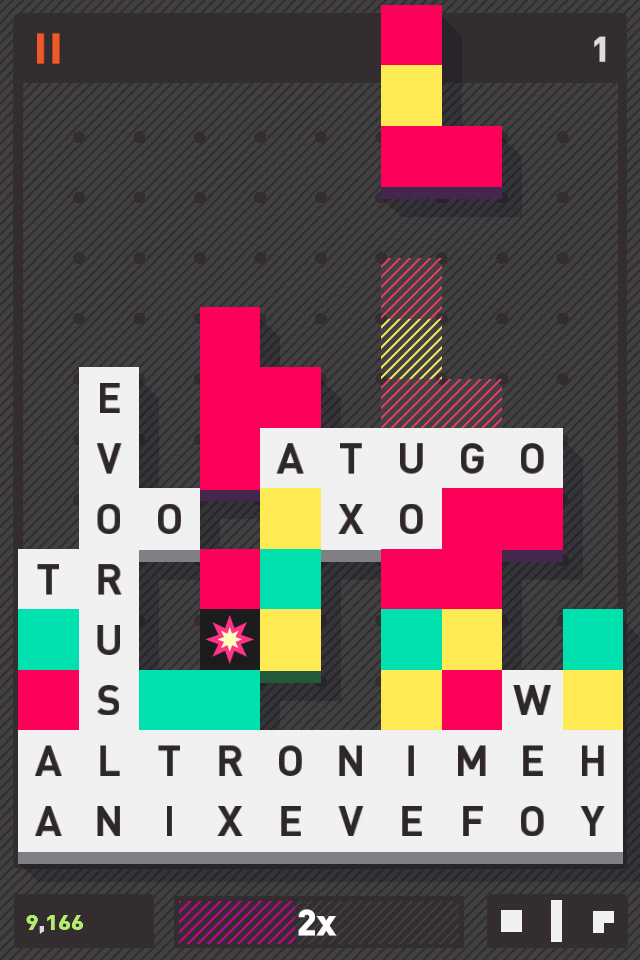
Wohlwend and Vollmer displaying Puzzlejuice (pictured) at the 2012 PAX 10 showcase

Wohlwend began to collaborate with Asher Vollmer when Vollmer reached out to Wohlwend for aesthetic advice on a game he was designing, Puzzlejuice. The game has been compared to a cross between Boggle, Tetris, and tile-matching, where tetromino blocks fall from the top of the screen that players turn into letters and rearrange into words. Wohlwend and Vollmer communicated nonverbally through the entire development process via a 365-message email chain. Vollmer served as the game's programmer, Wohlwend as the artist, and Jimmy Hinson as the composer. Puzzlejuice was selected for the PAX 10, a spotlighted group of indie games, in July 2012. It was released as a universal app for iPhone and iPad on January 19, 2012.

=== Hundreds ===
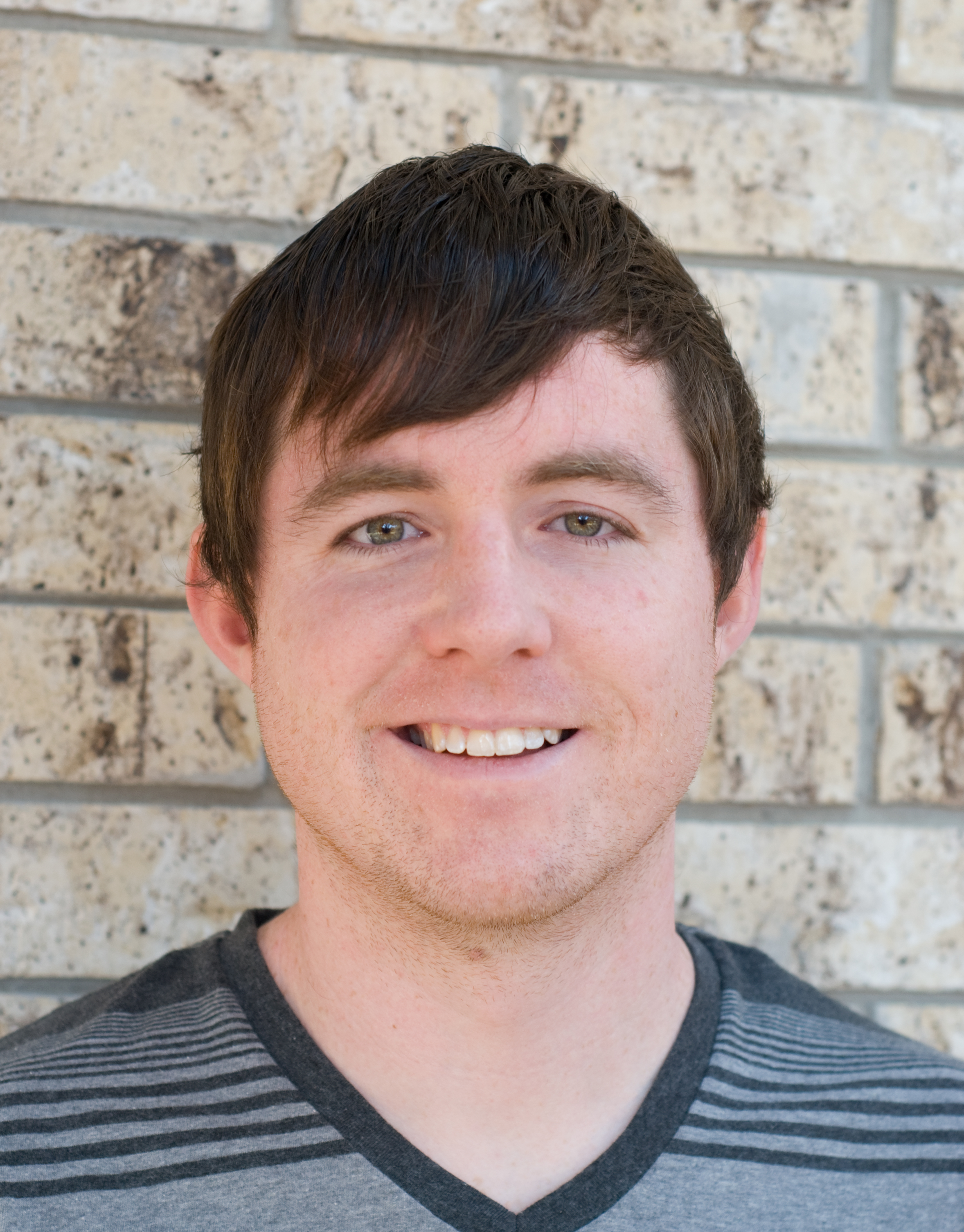
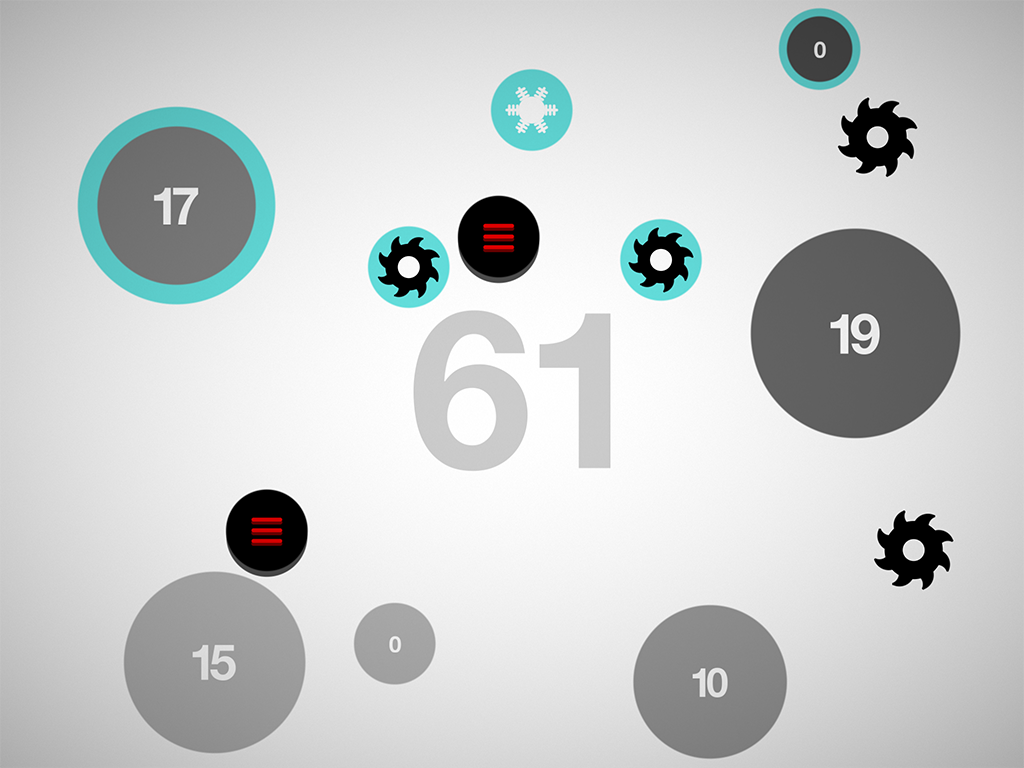
Adam Saltsman and screenshot of Hundreds

Upon finishing his role as artist on Solipskier, Wohlwend wanted to experiment with game programming by designing his own game. (Note: Wohlwend had some assistance with the in-game physics.) He developed Hundreds from an idea he had while staring at a ceiling, where he imagined a circle growing without overlapping another when growing. He found this to be a good core game concept and based the game around "patience and persistence". The game's style inadvertently borrowed from his first year in art school, where Wohlwend composed in black, white, and red so as to focus on composition rather than color. While Wohlwend's design style is "simple and elegant", the game's minimalism was also functional due to his inexperience with programming. The code was "brute forced" and written in a single file. He finished Hundreds as a Flash game in 2010, but when Flash sites were not interested in purchasing it, Wohlwend chose to open source the code (partly with the intent to spur "non-coders" to try coding, as he had). This version is available online at Newgrounds.

At a lull in-between projects, programmer Eric Johnson of Semi Secret Software found the open source code and ported the game to iPad in a weekend before notifying Wohlwend. At the time, Wohlwend did not have an iOS device to test the port, and had to purchase an iPad. Johnson's iPad version spurred Wohlwend to consider how Hundreds would work with multitouch and cooperative play, and Semi Secret's Adam Saltsman to consider a Hundreds collaborative iOS release. The project was intended to be a quick level expansion, but quickly surpassed its several month estimate. Wohlwend and Saltsman extended the game's mechanics with new circles and puzzles, and many of their implemented ideas were later removed. Wohlwend was happy with the final result and credited the game's "emergent interaction" qualities to Saltsman. They built on each other's level designs, though Wohlwend said that Saltsman made "basically all the levels". The new team enjoyed working with each other.

In Hundreds, players touch circles to make them grow without overlapping. There are 100 puzzles that increase in complexity. The Flash version was much simpler in design, and added circles onscreen as the game progressed. The iOS version added a new gameplay mode and a narrative element based on ciphers and codes, (Note: The cipher narrative derived from email conversations between Wohlwend and Saltsman about a "really obtuse and weird" subgame that functioned as a story. Wohlwend credited Saltsman with the idea of a Brave New World-style fiction within the game that used ciphers, though the idea was also influenced by a similar plot element in Dash Shaw's Bottomless Belly Button. They hoped the game's presentation conveyed "honest and confident rather than overly mysterious and weird".) and was released on January 7, 2013 for iPhone and iPad, and later for Android. It was nominated for several Independent Games Festival awards, and The Atlantic critic Ian Bogost wrote that the game functioned like a design object, a feat unique for the video game medium.

=== Ridiculous Fishing ===
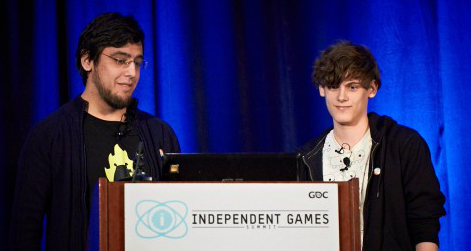
Ismail and Nijman of Vlambeer speaking at the 2013 GDC Independent Games Summit

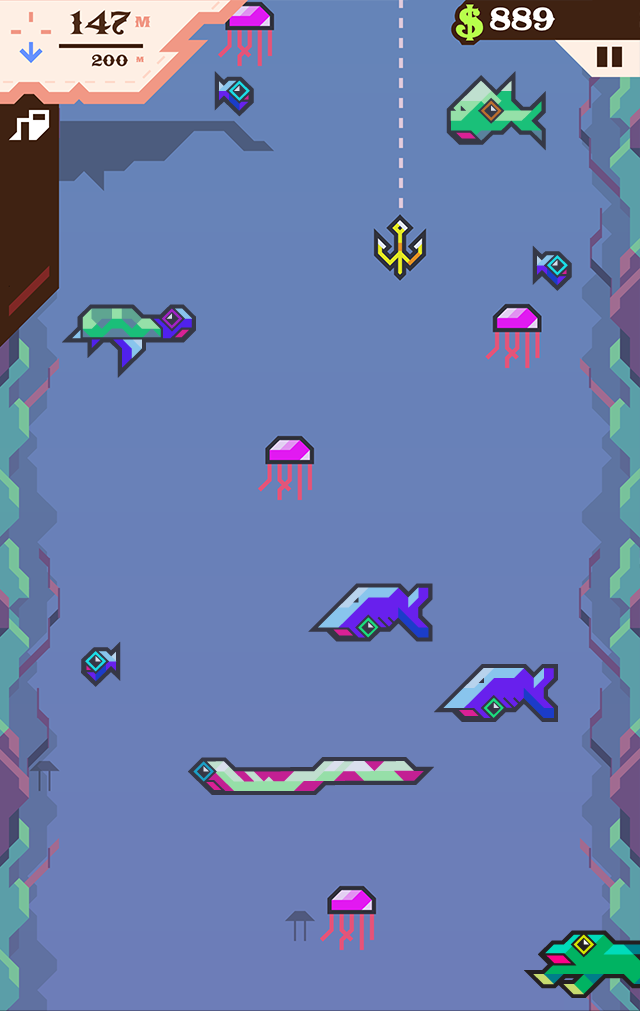
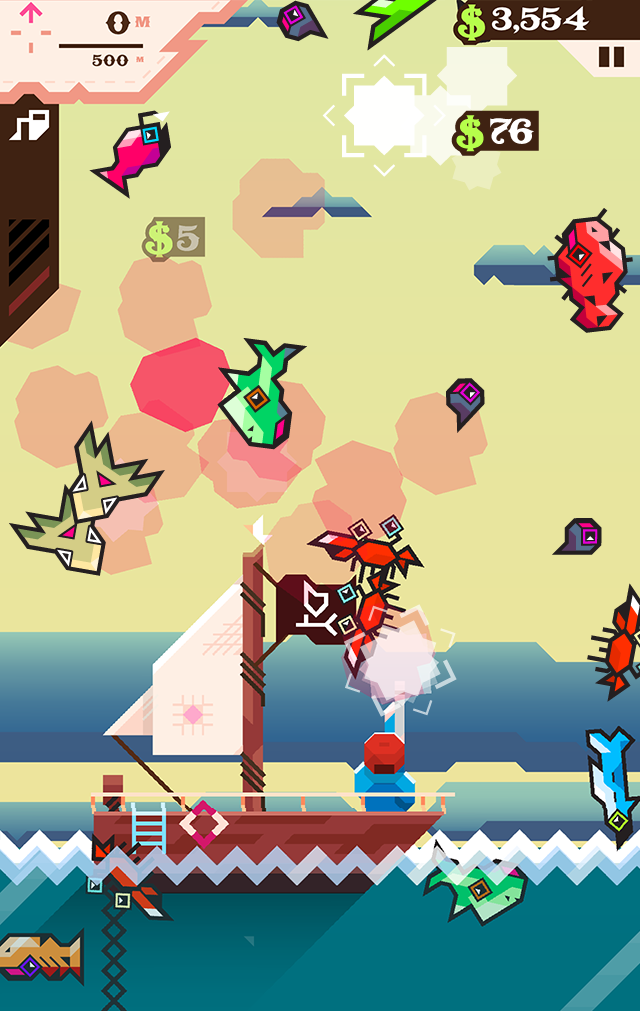
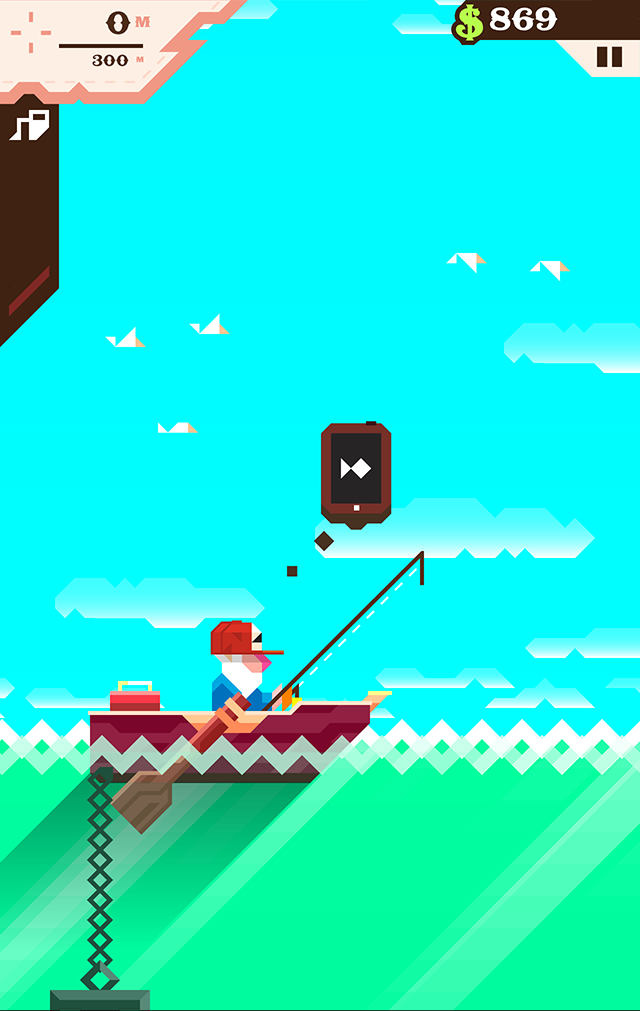
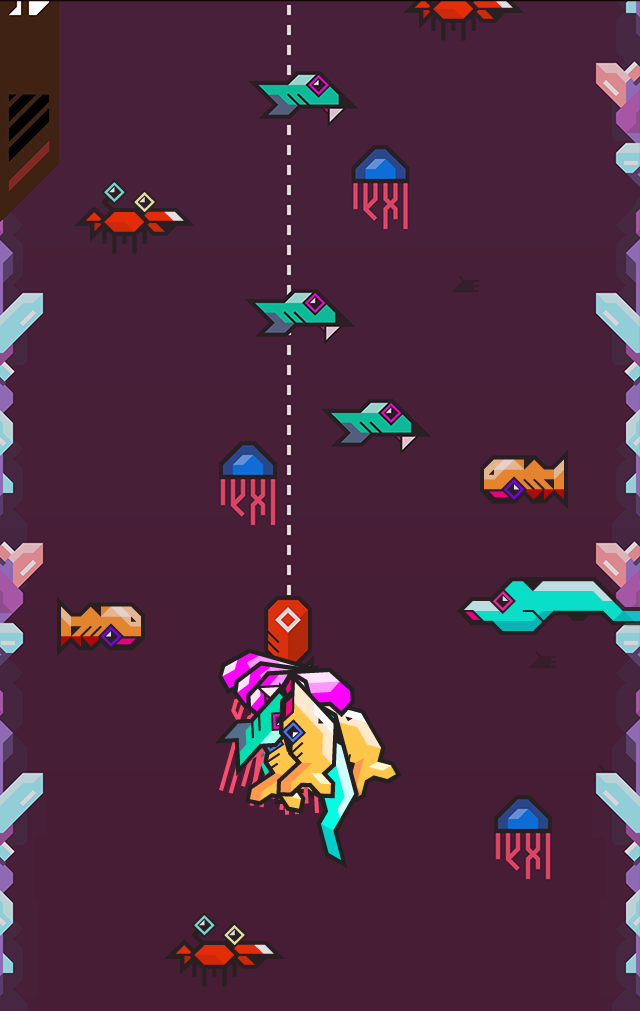
Ridiculous Fishing gameplay

Wohlwend produced the art for Vlambeer's Ridiculous Fishing. The four-person team—Vlambeer designer Jan Willem Nijman and marketer Rami Ismail alongside iOS developer Zach Gage—was described by games journalists as an "indie supergroup" and a "dream team". In Ridiculous Fishing, the player uses motion and touch controls to catch fish and consequently shoot them out of the sky for cash. The game is known for its developers' battle against a cloned version of their game released by another company. The team worked separately and sporadically with little progress as disheartened by their cloned game predicament, until an August 2012 road trip home across the United States from Penny Arcade Expo in Seattle to New York City convinced the team to set a deadline. They scrapped "90 percent" of their work, and Wohlwend moved to New York City to live with Gage and work 14-hour days during the final weeks.

The last parts of Ridiculous Fishing assembled smoothly and it was released March 14, 2013, for iOS and later that year for Android. It was well received at launch with "near-universal perfect scores" and won both a 2013 Apple Design Award and Apple's iPhone game of the year. While IGN's Justin Davis thought the game's levels could have been more differentiated in theme and art style, he found the "almost cubist design ... absolutely gorgeous". Welsh of Eurogamer agreed that Wohlwend's art was "achingly cool" and reflected a "retro and minimalist" indie gaming trend without overpowering the gameplay.

=== Threes! ===
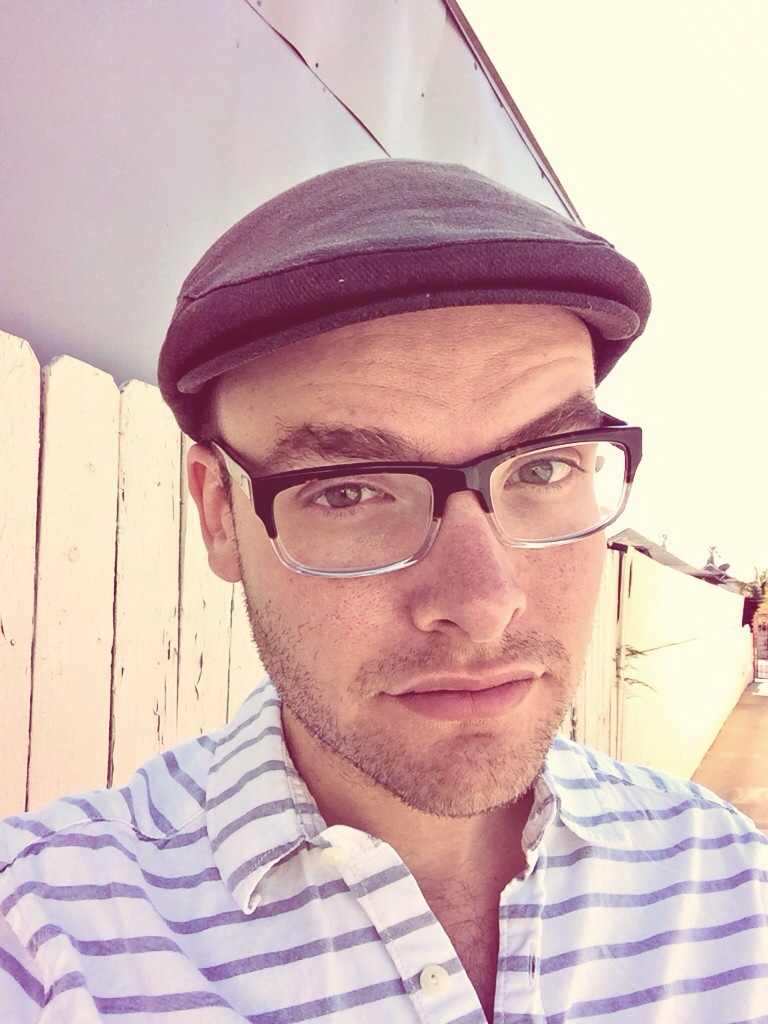
Asher Vollmer and Threes! demo

Wohlwend, Vollmer, and Hinson of Puzzlejuice collaborated again on Threes!, a game where the player slides numbered tiles on a four-by-four grid to combine addends and multiples of three. Its development began before Ridiculous Fishing's March 2013 release. Vollmer presented an idea similar to the final product in its simplicity: pair tiles as multiples of three. The first prototype was written in a single night. Vollmer and Wohlwend spent at least half a year of the game's 14-month development iterating on this main idea. Early Threes designs had no inclination towards minimalism: the pair felt that the game needed to appear more complex so as to interest players. Wohlwend sent Vollmer designs with themes such as sushi, chess, broccoli and cheese soup, and hydrogen atoms, which confused their test audiences. They received a "wake-up call" from fellow game designer Zach Gage, who encouraged them to return from their foray into complexity. The final game returned to its original theme of numbers. Speaking in retrospect, Wohlwend said the game "always wanted to be simple". He noted that players "think math" upon seeing the game's numbers, though the game is more about "spatial relationships" and just happens to have a "number theme".

When returning to the fundamental and original game concept—pairing tiles as multiples of three—the developers felt their experiments informed their final game development decisions. The theme of individual tile personalities extended to the final version, as tiles have faces and express emotions when paired. For example, the 384 tile has a pirate personality with a large tooth and a pirate eyepatch. Of the development process, Wohlwend called it "tough and frustrating and sometimes hard to see if it was worth it". It was released for iOS on February 6, 2014 and later ported to Android, with an Xbox One version announced as in development. The game received what video game review score aggregator Metacritic described as "universal acclaim". Eurogamer and TouchArcade awarded the game perfect scores, with the latter calling Threes "about as close as it gets to a perfect mobile game". Re/code reported that it "dominated" the chart in the following weeks and became one of the 25 highest grossing apps on the App Store. It later won a 2014 Apple Design Award.

=== TouchTone ===
In TouchTone's puzzles (left), the player rearranges the items onscreen to redirect a beam of light to its destination. The player is at the center of a story about government surveillance told through hacked emails (right), which are unlocked by completing puzzles.

After Gasketball's 2012 release, Boxleiter and Wohlwend planned a celebratory road trip to a game jam in Victoria, British Columbia. The game did not fare as expected, so Boxleiter used the two-day jam to create the core mirror reflection mechanics of what would become TouchTone, though it would take two years of sporadic work to finalize the remainder of the game. In TouchTone, the player monitors phone calls as part of a government surveillance program to find public threats. The story is told through a series of reflection puzzles wherein the player swipes the screen to reflect a beam around a room to its intended destination.

Mikengreg felt that their first theme of light, prisms, and audio signal too closely mimicked "a hacking minigame from a bigger AAA game like BioShock or System Shock", but eventually paired the concept with a satirical Edward Snowden theme following the mid-2013 global surveillance disclosures. Their original efforts were jocular, but their concept became more serious as the story and "political message" grew deeper. Boxleiter wrote most of the script, and together with Wohlwend, would conference after each chapter for coherency. Mikengreg decided against including an option to skip puzzles, which they felt would spoil the game and the player's capacity to adapt to increasing difficulty. They called this philosophy the "Derek Yu (of Spelunky) school of game design". TouchTone was released on March 19, 2015 for iOS. Review aggregator Metacritic characterized its reviews as generally favorable.

=== TumbleSeed ===
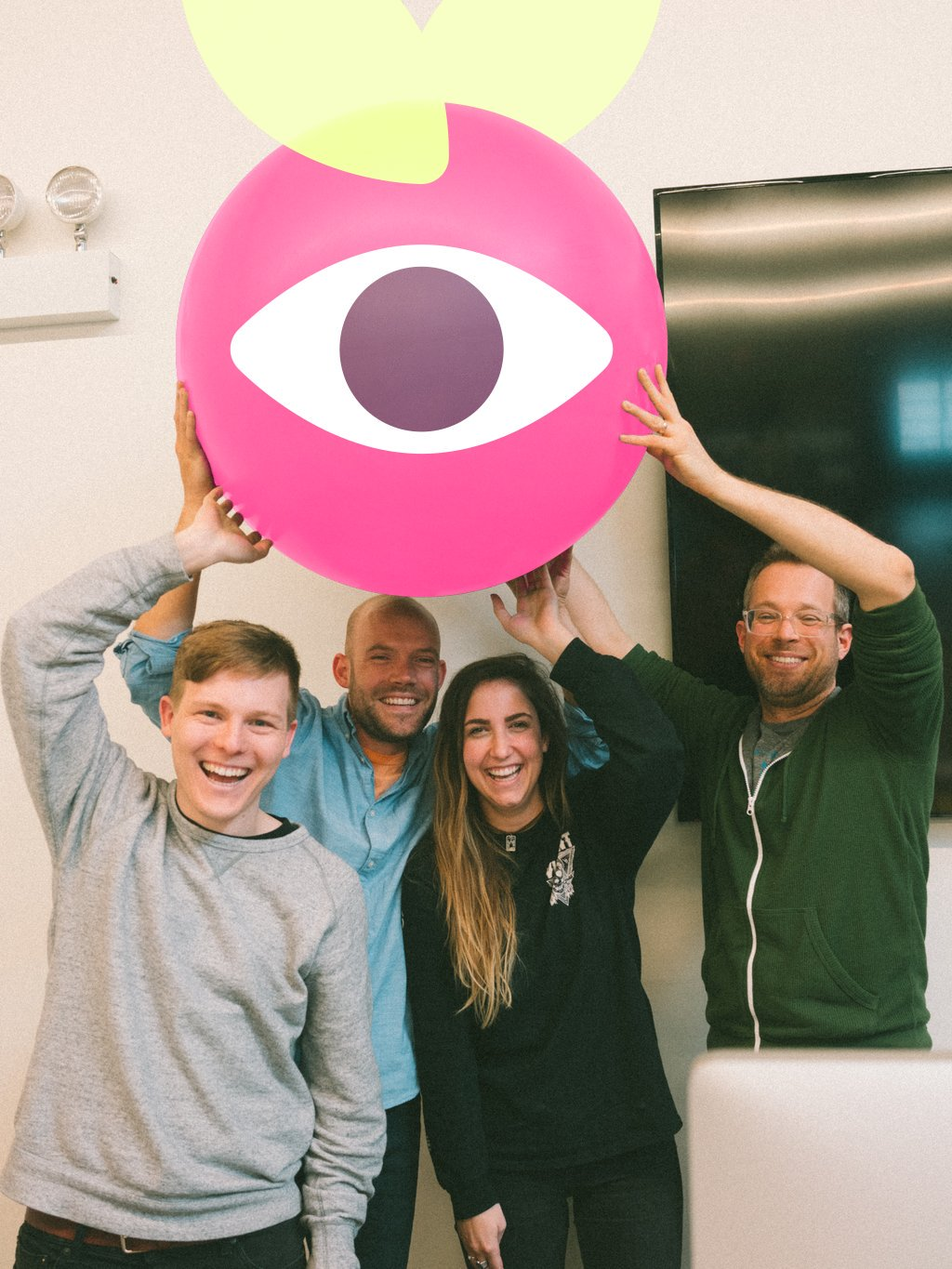
Wohlwend and the TumbleSeed development team

Wohlwend's friend Benedict Fritz developed a prototype of a mechanical arcade game from a bar that they frequented in Chicago. When Wohlwend saw the video of Ice Cold Beer online, they began work on an open world, dungeon crawl version of the game, which became TumbleSeed. They also worked through a Cards Against Humanity game incubation program in 2015, and several other indie developers based in Chicago joined the production. Based on the project's loose, collaboratory nature, Metro called the game's pedigree "as indie as indie gaming gets". With the announcement of the Nintendo Switch, the development team sought to become a "flagship" demonstration of the console's HD Rumble feature, in which the player proprioceptively "feels" in-game textures through the controller's fine-tuned vibrations. They cold-called Nintendo and began work together in June 2016, prior to the Switch's announcement. TumbleSeed was released on May 2, 2017, on Nintendo Switch, macOS, PlayStation 4, and Windows platforms. The developers credited the game's tepid critical reception and associated stigma of intense difficulty for the game's slow sales. While Wohlwend hoped that a post-release patch would resolve some of these issues, he did not expect the game to recoup its costs, though the team was proud of their product.
