= Gasketball =

2012 video game

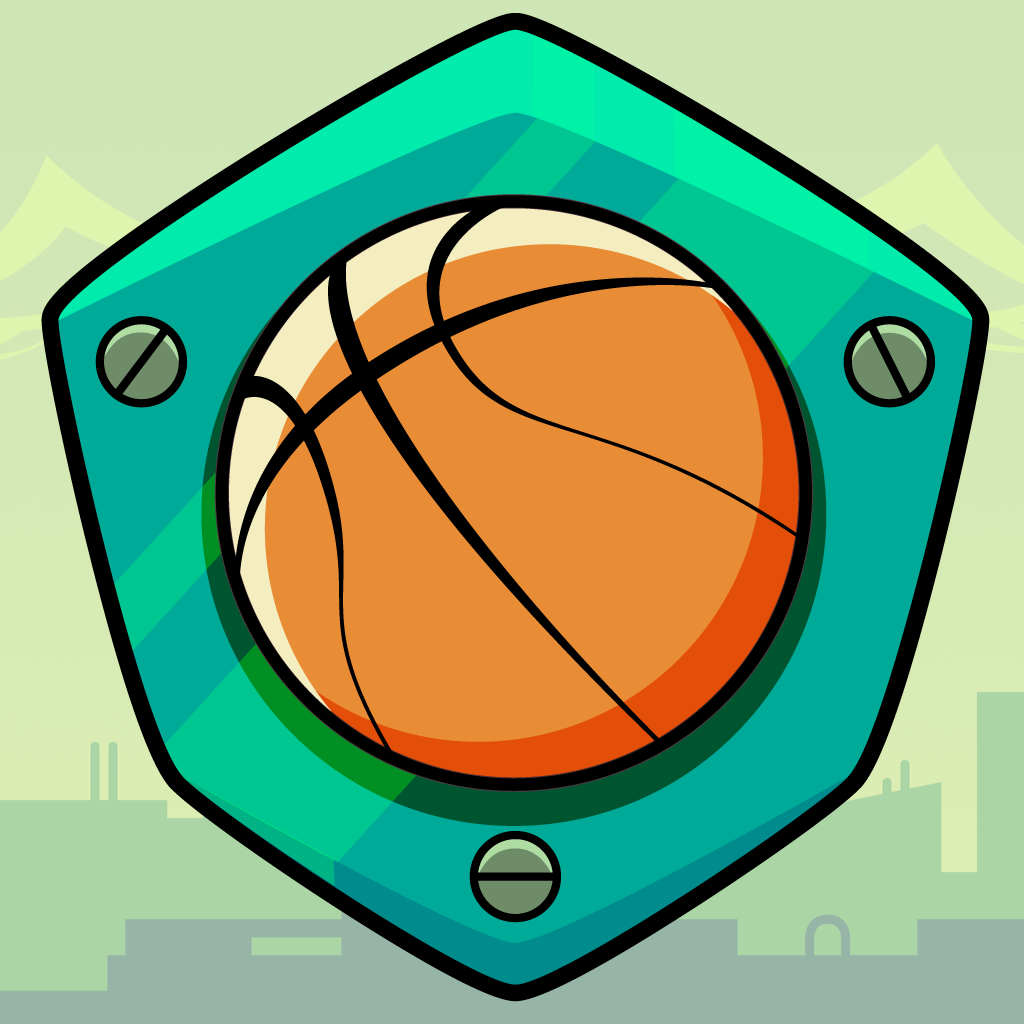
- App icon
- Developer: Mikengreg
- Publisher: Mikengreg
- Platform: iPad
- Release: August 9, 2012
- Genre: Puzzle
- Modes: Single-player, multiplayer

Gasketball is a basketball-themed puzzle video game for the iPad by Mikengreg, an independent development team of Michael Boxleiter and Greg Wohlwend. Players flick basketballs through 2D physics puzzles into the hoop in single-player, local multiplayer, and asynchronous HORSE-style online multiplayer modes. The game is free-to-play with in-app purchases. Development began in mid 2011 following Mikengreg's successful Solipskier. They were able to live from the earnings for Gasketball's two year development at their previous salary, which afforded them the stability to try new avenues and reject prototypes, though they worked 100-hour weeks. Towards the end of their development, they ran out of money and lived on the couches of friends. It was released on August 9, 2012, and the game did not reach their desired conversion rate at the time of launch.

The game received "generally favorable" reviews, according to video game review score aggregator Metacritic. Pocket Gamer gave the game their silver award, and Tim Rogers of Kotaku named Gasketball his 2012 game of the year, calling it "the beginning of the hardcore social game genre".

== Gameplay ==
In Gasketball, players flick basketballs through 2D physics puzzles (with flippers, portals, circular saw blades, and gravity switches) into a basketball hoop. Some puzzles include banking the basketball shot off multiple surfaces before making the basket. In the HORSE-style games, the player must match the exact setup of the opponent's shot, such as hitting the floor before entering the hoop. In the campaign, players get more points for making the shot without retrying, and have five attempts to make the hoop before moving to the next level shamefully. Players are awarded medals for the quality of their performance at the end of each chapter. Gold medals unlock new modes of play in the chapter. Every chapter has a unique theme, such as a construction site or outer space.

The game has local two-player multiplayer with a divided iPad screen, and asynchronous online multiplayer where players construct levels for their opponents to complete. Players spin a wheel at the beginning of their turn to determine how many hazards they get to place via drag and drop. A few of the items are unlocked at first, and more are available with progress through the game or in-app purchases. Gasketball uses a colorful palette and features a cranky robot, who provides a tutorial and resets the ball. It was released as free-to-play with the tutorial unlocked, and four to five chapters available as additional paid downloads.

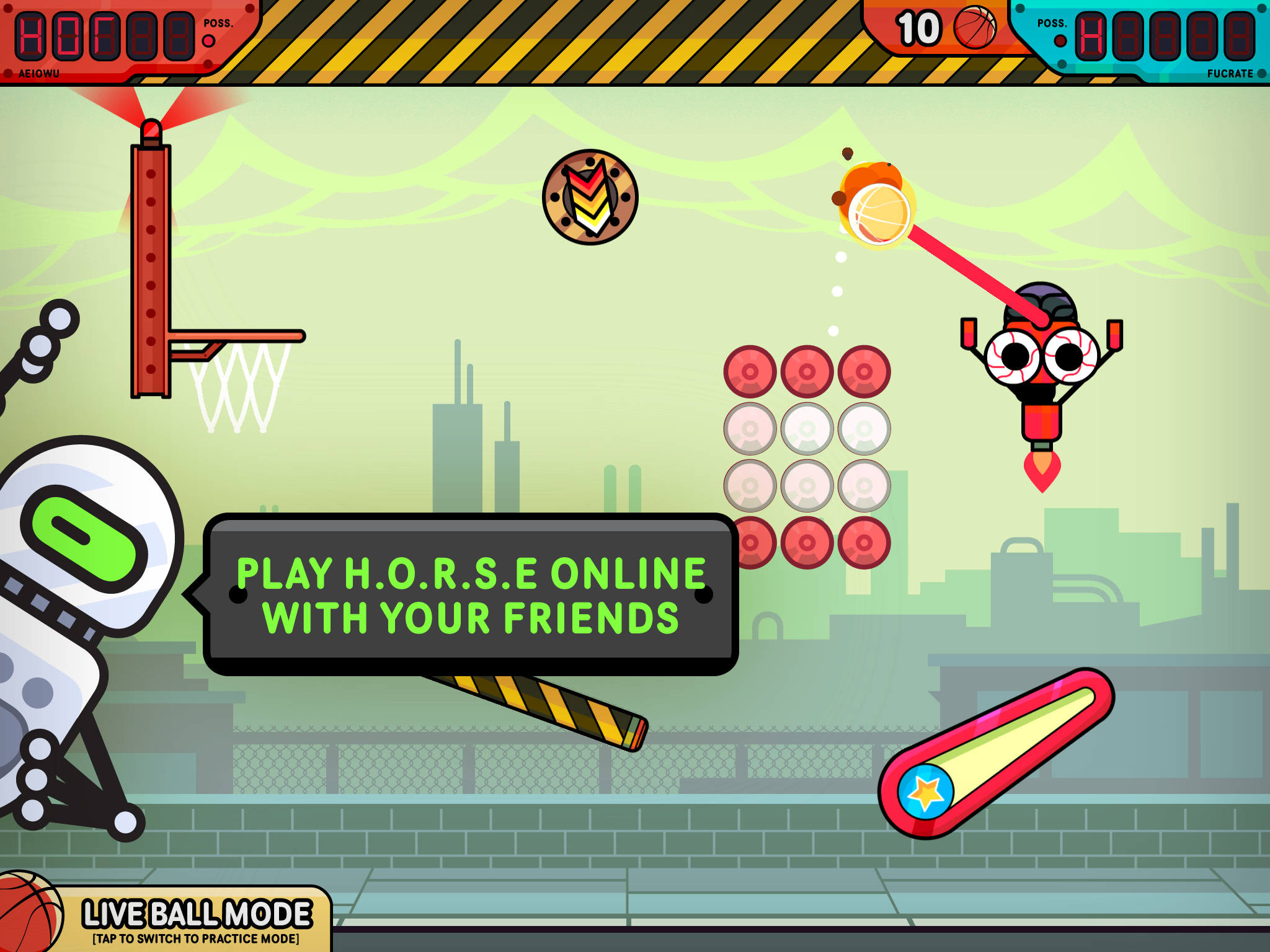
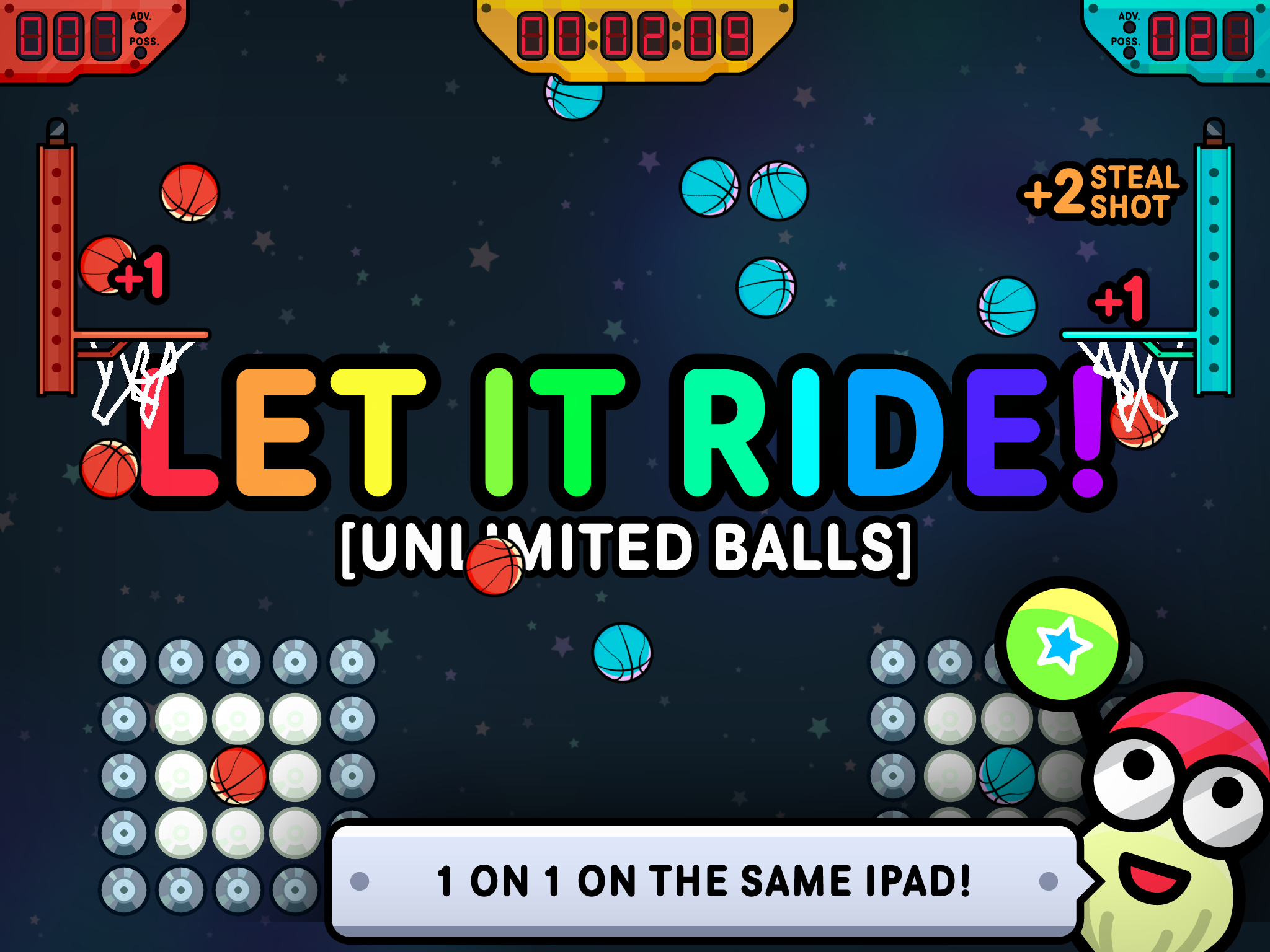
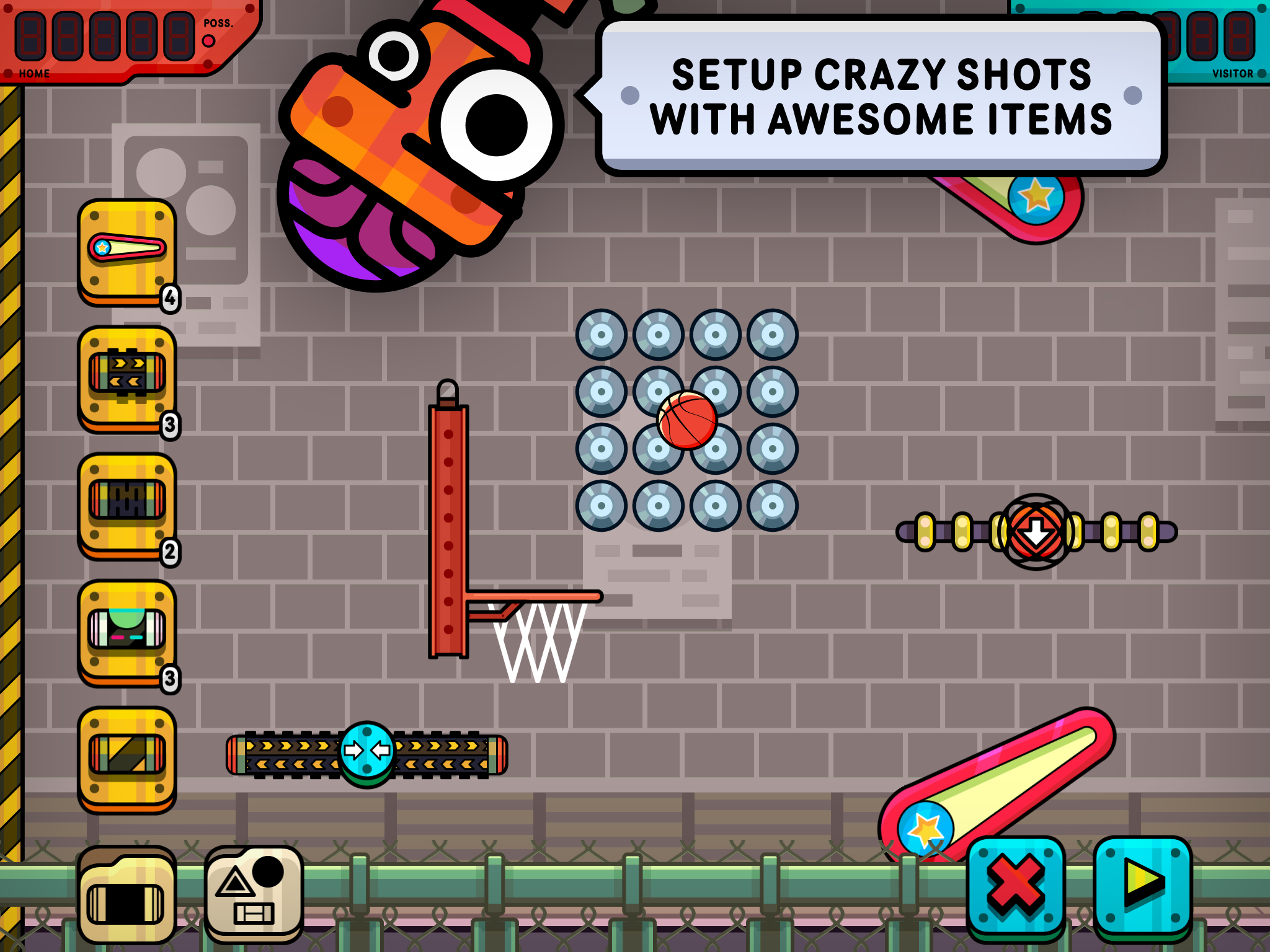
Gameplay screenshots

== Development ==
Gameplay trailer

Gasketball was developed and produced by Mikengreg, an Iowa-based two-man team: Michael Boxleiter and Greg Wohlwend. After releasing their first game, the sport-inspired Solipskier for iPhone and iPad, Boxleiter and Wohlwend lived off the profits for two years while working on Gasketball, paying themselves their same salaries from their Adobe Flash development days but having the security to try new ideas. Wohlwend made somewhat more income due to other collaborations, such as Puzzlejuice with Asher Vollmer, but shared his income with Boxleiter. Development began in mid 2011. Even though Solipskier was successful, the duo did not have a following comparable to indie developers like Team Meat and thus did not feel pressured to meet high expectations. Instead, their pressure was internal. Wohlwend said he worked 100-hour weeks with no weekends or vacations while living on the Solipskier funds. When they ran out of money, Boxleiter borrowed money from his parents, and eventually they both went homeless, living on the couches of friends.

It can get very nerve-wracking to think that you only have one shot at releasing each game, and every time you fail to reach your goals you get one step closer to having to quit trying.

— Boxleiter to TouchArcade, March 2012

In making Gasketball, Boxleiter and Wohlwend felt that their game quality had been improving over time, though designing for a million-person audience was "daunting" and Wohlwend questioned whether he could even recreate Solipskier's success. The former game was designed in fits of creativity while the latter had no such moments, and took longer to produce. They discarded "everything" multiple times during their prototyping process with the understanding that anything less than what they wanted would lead to a subpar end result. (Note: Wohlwend estimated about six "fairly polished prototypes" discarded.) Boxleiter had difficulty accepting praise towards the end of development, considering the weight of having to leave the industry if the many 100-hour weeks did not pan out in an accepted product.

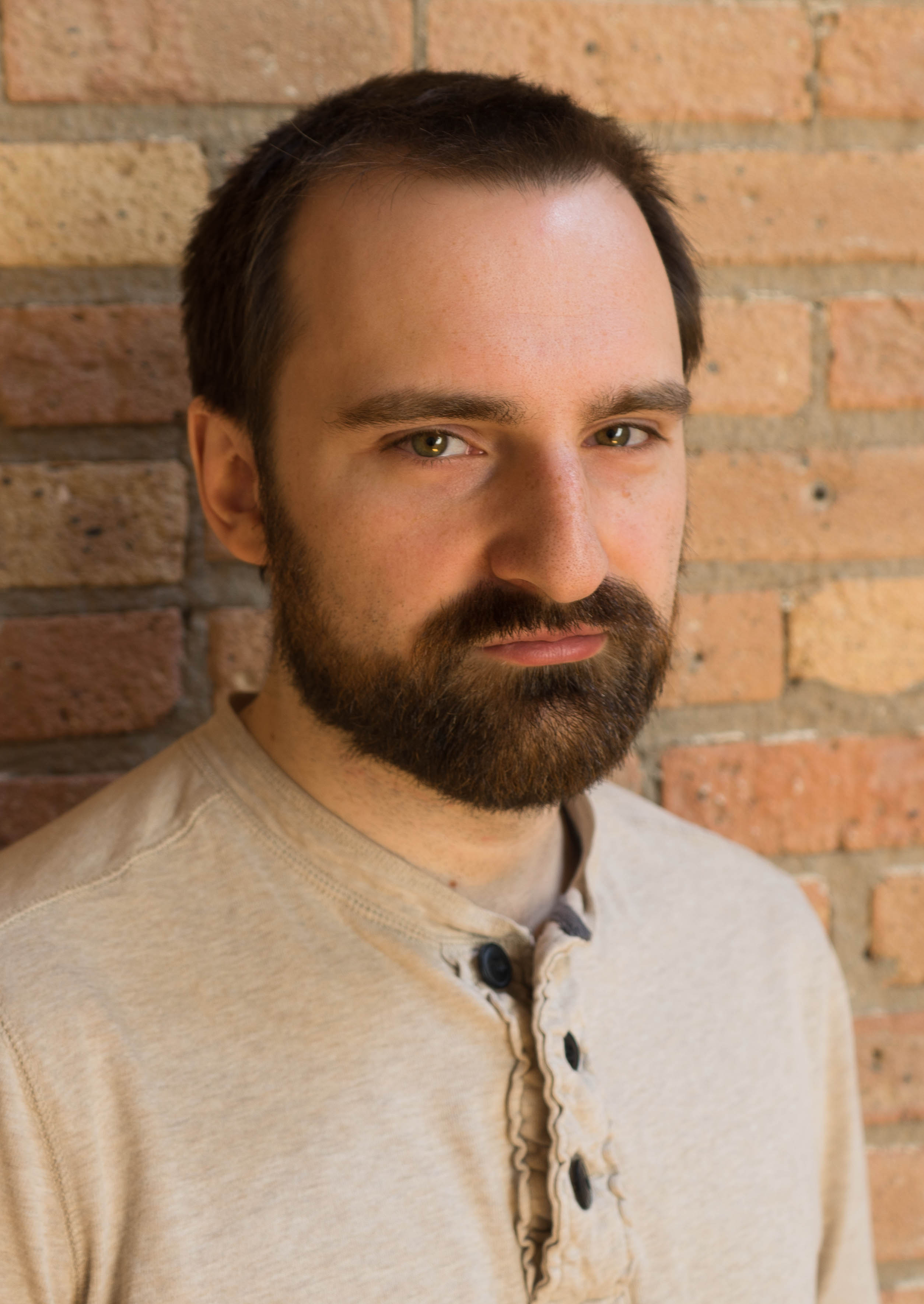
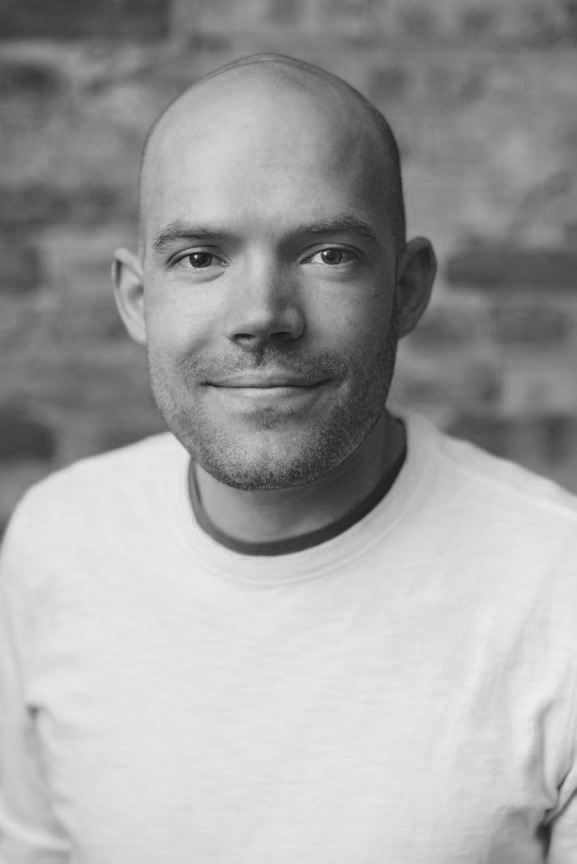
Mike Boxleiter and Greg Wohlwend

Mikengreg first announced the game on March 1, 2012, and it was later released for iPad on August 9, 2012. Mikengreg decided to release the game as free-to-play for the base game with in-app purchases for the extended content. Wohlwend saw that a quarter of the top-grossing games on iOS used in-app purchases (albeit with predatory practices) and felt that they could follow the model with a more ethical strategy: free to play, but pay once to unlock forever. Wohlwend later remarked that, "So far, humanity is proving to us that we can't have it both ways." They were told by friends that the purchase function was too hidden, which they later fixed. Journalists had noted the difficulty in purchasing the full version as well. Gasketball had been downloaded 200,000 times in its August 2012 launch week and was briefly ranked near the top of an iTunes top downloads ranking, though it did not break the top 200 grossing chart. The game's conversion rate from its free-to-play base package to the paid version was 0.67%—lower than their goal of at least 2% of an estimated five million downloads. The paid addition includes 100 additional levels and 10 new objects.

== Reception ==
Reception

Aggregate score
Aggregator	Score
Metacritic	86/100

Review scores
Publication	Score
Edge	8/10
Pocket Gamer	8/10
TouchArcade	4.5/5

The game received "generally favorable" reviews, according to video game review score aggregator Metacritic. Reviewers noted the game's character and creative vision. Pocket Gamer gave the game their silver award. Gasketball was Tim Rogers of Kotaku's 2012 game of the year.

Edge noted Mikengreg's deft ability with simple sound effects, citing their previous work with Solipskier. They praised the "sweet and personable" art design and the mix of "freewheeling creativity with arcade precision". Edge also praised the addition of the "decent" single-player campaign alongside the multiplayer. Pocket Gamer's Harry Slater called the single-player "entertaining" but felt the asynchronous multiplayer was the highlight. TouchArcade's Brad Nicholson called the game a cross between Amazing Alex and NBA Jam. While he found some puzzle designs imbalanced, Nicholson also felt that the interactions between the flipper and portal hazards were "surprisingly solid" and noted the game's lighthearted "welcome playground sort of feel" even as the easy learning curve reached Rube Goldberg-like complexity. Tim Rogers of Kotaku called Gasketball the "inverse Rube Goldberg" and "the beginning of the hardcore social game genre, of asynchronous gameplay as meaningful as FPS deathmatches". (Note: Bennett Foddy of QWOP originally recommended Gasketball to Rogers after hearing about TNNS and Rogers's future game development plans.)
