= Ronald Jenkees =

American musician

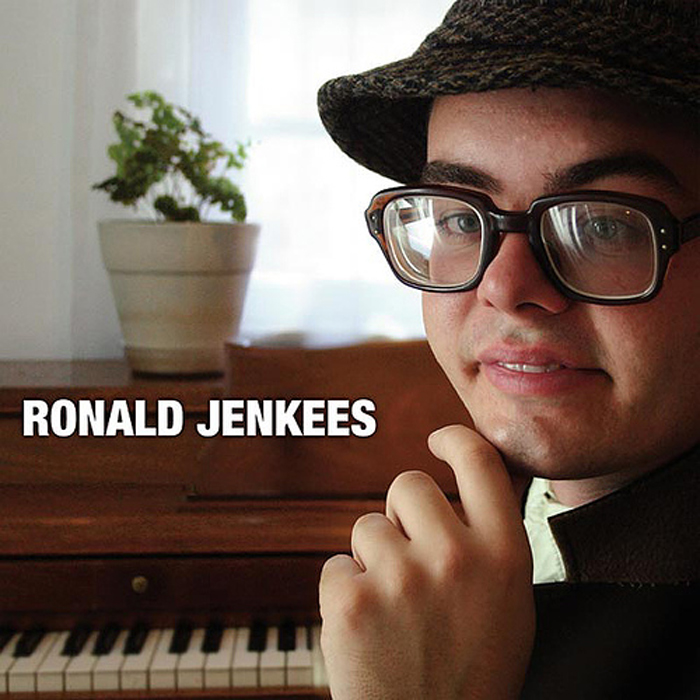
- Jenkees's 2007 self-titled debut album

Background information
- Origin: Kentucky, U.S.
- Genres: IDM; electronic rock; techno; hip-hop (early)
- Occupations: Musician; composer
- Instruments: FL Studio; keyboard controllers; piano; harmonica; vocals (early)
- Years active: 2004–present
- Label: Independent
- Website: ronaldjenkees.com

Ronald Jenkees is an American composer and musician best known for his keyboard performances on YouTube. As of September 2025, his videos have over 88 million views, and he has 400 thousand subscribers. Jenkees has released five independent albums: Ronald Jenkees (2007), Disorganized Fun (2009), Days Away (2012), Alpha Numeric (2014), and Rhodes Deep (2017). He issued an album of tracks (either without the lead line or drums) for fans to play along with, Make It Fun – Vol. 1 (2016) as well as remastered singles dating from 2017 to 2024 on Wonder and Flow (2025).

== Career ==
Jenkees began releasing beats and raps online under the nickname "Big Cheez" around 2003. In 2006, he began uploading music-related content to YouTube. The videos usually featured him wearing a hat and greeting his viewers by saying "Hello YouTubes!" His videos gradually gained popularity, particularly after Bill Simmons from ESPN.com featured Jenkees and asked him to record his podcast theme, and again after being "thumbed up" by members of the StumbleUpon community. In 2007, Jenkees independently released his first studio album, Ronald Jenkees.

In June 2009, he was featured on the Sound Tribe Sector 9 album Peaceblaster: The New Orleans Make It Right Remixes, producing a remix of "Beyond Right Now". In July 2009, he released his second album, Disorganized Fun. Days Away came out in 2012, Alpha Numeric in 2014, and Rhodes Deep in April 2017. A selection of music from his first two albums is included in the Iridium Studios game Before the Echo.

== Musical style ==
Jenkees creates a variety of music, ranging from electronic to hip-hop to rock, using pianos, keyboards, and various PC-controlled electronic synthesizers. He plays the harmonica in some of his slower-tempo songs. Jenkees is distinguished by the array of hats he wears, his thick glasses, and his distinctive voice.

== Discography ==
Studio albums

- Ronald Jenkees (2007)
- Disorganized Fun (2009)
- Days Away (2012)
- Alpha Numeric (2014)
- Make It Fun – Vol. 1: Tracks for Jamming with Ronald Jenkees (2016)
- Rhodes Deep (2017)
- Wonder and Flow – Singles 2017–2024 (2025)

Singles

- "Red Lemonade Remixed" (2012)
- "From the Arrow Loop" (2013)
- "Try the Bass" (2015)
- "Mindful" (2017)
- "Sky Tied" (2019)
- "Halloween Theme" (2019)
- "Wonder and Flow" (2023)
- "Outlaw: Inspired by The Outlaw Ocean, a Book by Ian Urbina" feat. Phourist & the Photons (2023)
- "Canon Bells" (2023)

=== Appearances ===
- Sound Tribe Sector 9: Peaceblaster: The New Orleans Make It Right Remixes (track 29, "Beyond Right Now") (2009)
- Soundtrack for the PC game Before the Echo (previously known as Sequence) by Iridium Studios (2011)
- Soundtrack for There Came an Echo by Iridium Studios (2015)
- Music on hold when calling Google in North America (2015)

== See also ==
- List of YouTube celebrities
