= There Came an Echo =

2015 video game

- Developer: Iridium Studios
- Composers: Big Giant Circles; Ronald Jenkees
- Platforms: Microsoft Windows; PlayStation 4
- Release: Windows; 24 February 2015; PlayStation 4: NA: 31 May 2016; PAL: 1 June 2016
- Genre: Real-time tactics
- Mode: Single player

There Came an Echo is a real-time tactics video game developed for Microsoft Windows through Steam in 2015, and for PlayStation 4's PlayStation Network in 2016. It is the sequel to the 2011 video game Before the Echo. The player can use a voice control system to direct their units around the battlefield to ensure a tactical advantage over the enemy. The game features voice actors Wil Wheaton, Ashly Burch, Yuri Lowenthal, Laura Bailey and Cassandra Morris.

The game was crowdfunded via Kickstarter for $115,570 (USD) by 3,906 backers, the requested budget was $90,000. The game received further investment from Intel to implement Intel's RealSense technology.

== Development ==
The developer has shown interest in bringing the game to Linux and SteamOS provided there is sufficient community support to do so. It was also mentioned that the main blocker is the proprietary voice libraries currently used by the game that do not support those platforms, so another library would need to be found that would suit the functional needs of the game.

== Reception ==
Reception

Aggregate score
Aggregator	Score
Metacritic	(PS4) 59/100 (PC) 58/100

Review scores
Publication	Score
4Players	(PC) 71%
Destructoid	(PC) 6/10
Edge	(PC) 5/10
GamesMaster	(PC) 43%
GameSpot	(PC) 4/10
GamesTM	(PC) 6/10
GameZone	(PC) 7.5/10
Hardcore Gamer	(PC) 4/5
PlayStation Official Magazine – UK	(PS4) 5/10
Push Square	(PS4) 5/10

The game received "mixed" reviews on both platforms according to the review aggregation website Metacritic.

Hardcore Gamer said of the PC version, "Iridium Studios has demonstrated how to properly create something fresh and exciting that encapsulates everything that the indie scene is capable of. Sure, its story can get a bit incoherent, its non-voice controls are awkward, and there are moments of spotty voice-recognition, but the good greatly outweighs what little bad there is."
