= TumbleSeed =

2017 video game

- Publisher: aeiowu
- Designers: Benedict Fritz; Greg Wohlwend
- Programmers: Benedict Fritz; David Laskey
- Artists: Greg Wohlwend; Jenna Blazevich
- Composer: Joel Corelitz
- Platforms: macOS, Nintendo Switch, PlayStation 4, Windows
- Release: May 2, 2017
- Genre: Action
- Mode: Single-player

TumbleSeed is an indie action video game, created by developer Benedict Fritz and designer Greg Wohlwend, in which the player balances a rolling seed on an ascending, horizontally slanted vine past procedurally generated obstacles to reach the top of a mountain. It is based on the mechanical arcade game Ice Cold Beer and built partially through the Cards Against Humanity game incubation program. TumbleSeed was released in May 2017 to generally favorable reviews on MacOS, Nintendo Switch, PlayStation 4, and Windows platforms. Critics, in particular, appreciated their haptic sense of the rolling seed from the Nintendo Switch's sensitive HD Rumble. Many reviewers noted TumbleSeed's intense and sometimes uneven difficulty, which the developers hoped to address in a post-release update. They credited this stigma and a tepid critical reception for the slow sales, but were proud of their work.

== Gameplay ==
TumbleSeed begins in a quiet forest village disturbed by angry creatures making holes in the ground. A seed is tasked to fulfill a vague prophecy by ascending the mountain, progressing through the forest, jungle, desert, and snow, to save the town. The player controls an ascending, horizontal, and slanted vine to balance a rolling seed past procedurally generated holes and enemy obstacles to reach the top of a mountain. With a controller, the player uses two analog sticks to raise and lower the two edges of the horizontal vine while managing the momentum of the seed. If the seed falls into a hole or hits an enemy, the player loses a life ("heart") and resumes from an earlier position, but the game ends when all hearts are depleted. Some punishments are more severe: A seed that falls into a hole will resume from the last flagged checkpoint, but if the seed collides with spikes or loses all hearts, the game ends and the player returns to the bottom of the mountain to try again.

While ascending the mountain, the player activates helpful power-up abilities by collecting and planting minerals in marked plots. While there are over 30 abilities in total, the player starts with the basic four: Flagseed creates an additional checkpoint (instead of regressing further down the mountain upon losing a heart), Heartseed creates additional hearts from minerals, and the Crystal ability generates minerals from multiple plots. Thornvine's single-use, protective thorny vine can hurt enemies if aligned correctly, though some enemies require more than one hit to die, and the player forfeits all thorns upon losing a heart. As the game progresses, the player collects additional abilities, such as Flailflower, which turns the seed into an anchor for a spiky flail, and Floodfruit, which fills surrounding holes with water for easy passage. Therefore, the player constantly decides whether to use minerals offensively (to eliminate enemies), defensively (to bypass difficult sections), or at all.

After completing a portion of the mountain, the player reaches a basecamp intermezzo with multiple opportunities for collecting new abilities. The player can trade minerals for abilities in the store, and choose between two abilities to receive for free. The basecamp also contains minigames, such as a shooting range, a gambling device, and optional sidequests, which reward the player with shortcuts to later stages in subsequent playthroughs for completing challenges like finishing a level within a time limit or without receiving damage.

Some enemies move in predictable patterns and others hunt the player. They range in resemblance from larvae and vultures to spiders. While ascending the mountain, the player passes through themed biomes, such as a forest, a desert, and snow, and each section of the mountain introduces new enemies that force the player to modify their strategy. TumbleSeed is depicted in a simple, colorful art style. Its characters are one-eyed, seed-shaped creatures that occasionally have hats. Their dialogue is visualized with speech bubbles, in text and emojis. Additionally, TumbleSeed includes other features such as quests, leaderboards, and daily challenges.

The Four Peaks patch adds several elements to make the game friendlier, including training levels, a Weekly Challenge, and benefits that persist between playthroughs. The Battle Mode, exclusive to the Nintendo Switch release, is a King of the Hill-style mode for two players to compete to hold a set region for the longest.

== Development ==
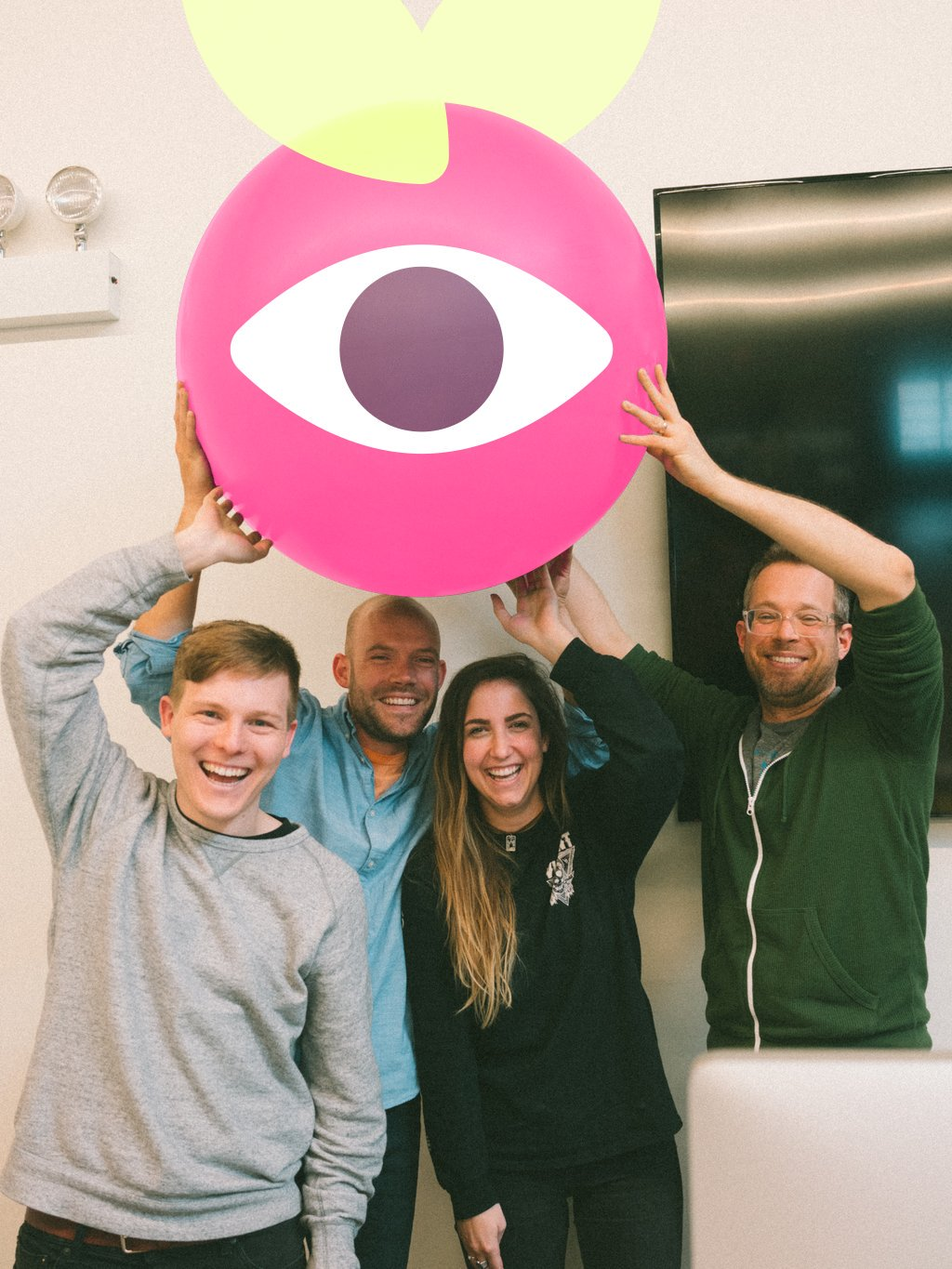
TumbleSeed development staff

The game is based on Ice Cold Beer, a mechanical arcade game in which the player controls the ends of a metal rod to raise a rolling, metal ball vertically in a wooden cabinet while avoiding holes cut into the wood. The Chicago-based indie development team found the machine at an arcade where they competitively played the 2013 video game Killer Queen. Developer Benedict Fritz later prototyped a version of Ice Cold Beer in the Unity game engine with a simple white background and black, circular holes. His friend, designer Greg Wohlwend, who had previously worked on Threes and Ridiculous Fishing, saw a short, online video of Fritz's prototype and the two began to work together on the project by adding enemies, an in-game world, and procedurally generated levels. Their prototypes included dungeon crawl and open world, action-adventure genre explorations. They spent two years designing the title and wanted to honor and contribute to the legacy of Ice Cold Beer. They also worked through a Cards Against Humanity game incubation program in 2015, and several other indie developers based in Chicago joined the production: David Laskey, Jenna Blazevich, and composer Joel Corelitz. Based on the project's loose, collaboratory nature, Metro called the game's pedigree "as indie as indie gaming gets". The team released a promotional trailer in August 2016 ahead of a demo at the PAX West game show.

With the announcement of the Nintendo Switch, the development team sought to become a "flagship" demonstration of the console's HD Rumble feature, in which the player proprioceptively "feels" in-game textures through the controller's fine-tuned vibrations. The developers thought that the Switch's "high-fidelity vibration" afforded players a greater sense of in-game detail with better perception about the seed's speed and direction. They cold-called Nintendo and began work together in June 2016, prior to the Switch's announcement. Designer Greg Wohlwend saw the game as sharing classic Nintendo attributes, including a wide color palette, accessibility, and difficulty. Nintendo, at the time, was thawing its relations with indie developers by removing restrictions for development on their consoles. Wohlwend said that their partnership was positive and the port of the game's code to the Switch platform was painless. Originally planned for release in 2015, TumbleSeed was released on May 2, 2017, on Nintendo Switch, MacOS, PlayStation 4, and Windows platforms. The Nintendo Switch release includes an exclusive King of the Hill-style Battle Mode.

== Reception ==
Reception

Aggregate score
Aggregator	Score
Metacritic	78/100

Review scores
Publication	Score
Destructoid	8/10
Eurogamer	Recommended
GameSpot	6/10
Nintendo Life	8/10
Polygon	6/10
The Guardian	5/5
Metro	8/10

The game received "generally favorable" reviews, according to video game review aggregator platform Metacritic. Reviewers recommended the game, in particular, for short bursts of play with the portable Nintendo Switch. Reviewers deemed the Nintendo Switch's HD Rumble a good fit for the core rolling mechanic and aesthetics. Nintendo Life said HD Rumble made the Switch's portable mode "the definitive way to play" TumbleSeed. Its haptic sensation approximated how it felt to play the mechanical Ice Cold Beer. Reviewers additionally compared the Ice Cold Beer conceit to the core mechanic of Shrek n' Roll (2007) and portable, plastic maze puzzles.

Multiple reviewers commented on the gameplay's chafing difficulty and uneven difficulty progression. TumbleSeed stops short of the "masocore" genre of punishingly difficult games, but its imprecise controls nevertheless demand patience to develop proficiency and mastery. At a fundamental level, Eurogamer found the controls "maddening and mesmerizing", and Polygon, out of frustration, wanted to directly control the seed. The multitasking player is made to "never feel safe" between balancing encroaching enemies, unpredictable enemy spawns, precarious controls, and easy deaths, all while managing crystal resources. Polygon considered the strategic elements, like deciding whether to go on offense or defense, to be the most interesting aspect. Others concentrated on TumbleSeed's art and movement mechanics, as Wired's reviewer appreciated the slow process of learning how it is best to navigate the game and additionally found a new aspect to value each time she played it. Some disagreed as to whether the game's challenge was appropriate and never malicious, or often unbalanced and frustrating compared to its rewards. The randomness of each basecamp's power-up offerings also contributed to uneven difficulty between playthroughs.

Metro contended that though TumbleSeed was marketed as a roguelike, apart from its procedurally generated levels, it was closer in genre to traditional arcade games. Though like roguelikes, mistakes are costly and unforgivingly punished by returning the player to the beginning of the game. Polygon wrote that while this mechanic is acceptable, the act of losing all equipped upgrades upon losing a single heart was harsh.

The Guardian saw "an obvious throughline" between designer Greg Wohlwend's prior work and the colorful, simple, and cute visuals of TumbleSeed. Reviewers said "bright art and cheery music" made the environment inviting and lively, though not particularly memorable as to distract from the gameplay. Some critics struggled to visually distinguish between cosmetic and active objects. It visually recalled the art of Patapon, according to Nintendo Life. TumbleSeed was an honorable mention for "Excellence in Audio" at the 2017 Game Developers Conference.

== Post-release ==
'It's a pressure cooker filled with gunpowder that only a monk could endure,' [Wohlwend] said of the game's 'overwhelming' amount of moving parts.

— Wohlwend's postmortem of TumbleSeed quoted in Polygon

A month after release, the developers worked to make the game less difficult, in response to criticism from reviewers. In a postmortem released alongside a set of updates, TumbleSeed designer Greg Wohlwend credited the slow sales to the title's tepid critical reception and stigma of high difficulty. He wrote that critics considered the game unfair and unforgivingly hard, as reflected in mediocre scores from major gaming websites. Players were expected to withstand an overwhelming amount of simultaneous elements and as such, few reached the end of the game. The "4 Peaks Update" added four new areas and abilities to simplify the game, such as reducing incoming damage or increasing stealth near enemies. The game was unlikely to recoup its costs, Wohlwend wrote, and the update was doubtful to change that course, but he felt proud of their development effort and considered the update to be therapy. The June 2017 update was released for Windows and was anticipated for consoles soon after.
