= Before the Echo =

2011 video game

- Developer: Iridium Studios
- Publisher: Iridium Studios
- Platforms: Xbox 360 (Xbox Live Indie Games), Microsoft Windows, OS X, Linux
- Release: Xbox Live Arcade; May 5, 2011; Windows; October 20, 2011; OS X, Linux; October 15, 2015
- Genres: Music, role-playing
- Mode: Single-player

Before the Echo (formerly known as Sequence) is a music role-playing video game developed and published by Iridium Studios for the Xbox 360 (Xbox Live Indie Games) and Microsoft Windows in 2011, and for OS X and Linux in 2015. The game received a sequel, There Came an Echo, in 2015.

== Development ==
The game was renamed Before the Echo in 2015 due to a copyright claim from the makers of the board game Sequence. The developer of the game, Jason Wishnov, stated on NeoGAF that he did not believe the copyright extended into electronic software, but did not wish to risk legal proceedings, believing that the claim amounted to "bullying".

== Reception ==
Reception

Aggregate scores
Aggregator	Score
GameRankings	(X360) 68% (PC) 67%
Metacritic	(PC) 70/100

Review scores
Publication	Score
Edge	(X360) 8/10
Eurogamer	(X360) 9/10
GameSpot	(PC) 5/10
IGN	(PC) 6.5/10
RPGFan	(PC) 72%

The PC version received "mixed or average reviews" according to the review aggregation website Metacritic.
