= Ice Cold Beer =

Mechanical arcade game

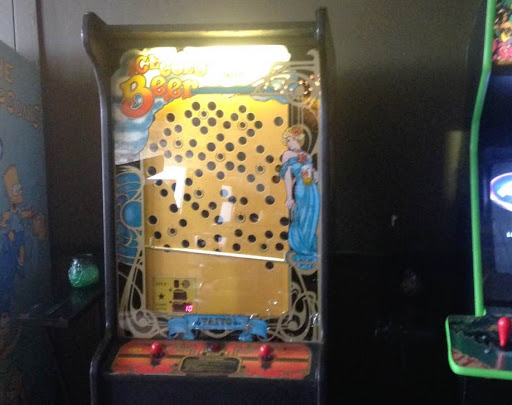
- Ice Cold Beer Taito arcade game from 1983
- Developer(s): Taito
- Designer(s): Keith Egging
- Release: 1983
- Mode(s): Single-player, multiplayer

Ice Cold Beer is a mechanical arcade game released by Taito in 1983. The game is in a similar cabinet to an arcade video game, but where the screen would normally be there is a vertical wooden playfield dotted with holes. Two joysticks on the control panel control the height of the two ends of a metal bar that moves up and down the playfield, with a bearing ball rolling back and forth on the bar. The playfield is an amber color, and the holes in the playfield are suggestive of bubbles rising in a mug of beer.

The objective of the game is to use the two joysticks to tip the bar back and forth and maneuver the ball up to a specific lit hole on the playfield, while avoiding unlit holes. When the player deposits the ball in the lit hole, the ball and the bar return to the bottom of the playfield, and the next target hole is lit. The game begins with the bottom-most hole lit, and subsequent lit holes become more and more difficult to reach while avoiding unlit holes. There are also versions with a ticket dispenser.

Taito also released a "family friendly" version of the game in 1984 entitled Zeke's Peak, where the artwork of bubbles rising in a mug of beer was replaced by a mountain-climbing theme. The main character is Zeke, the protagonist from Taito's earlier arcade game Zoo Keeper.

Ice Cold Beer was designed by Keith Egging, who was VP of product development for Taito America.

As of July 2024, Roddy "notroddy" Brown, who resides in Tampa, FL by way of Kitanakagusuku, Okinawa, Japan, holds the undisputed world records across all categories in Ice Cold Beer, including the most points in 15 minutes, the most points in an hour, and the highest overall score of 2,168,560. All three world records were broken at Transmission Arcade in Columbia, SC, on June 26 - 27 of the same year.

== Current World Records ==
| Category | Holder | Score | Date achieved | Location |
|---|---|---|---|---|
| 15 Minute Speed Run (Taito) | Roddy "notroddy" Brown | 20,990 | 06/26/2024 | Transmission Arcade |
| 1 Hour Speed Run (Taito) | Roddy "notroddy" Brown | 81,290 | 06/26/2024 | Transmission Arcade |
| Overall Points (Taito) | Roddy "notroddy" Brown | 2,168,560 | 06/27/2024 | Transmission Arcade |
| 15 Minute Speed Run (Retro Arcade Remake) | Roddy "notroddy" Brown | 23,450 | 07/15/2024 | Logan Arcade |
| 1 Hour Speed Run (Retro Arcade Remake) | Roddy "notroddy" Brown | 92,860 | 08/08/2024 | Lowry Parcade |
| Overall Points (Retro Arcade Remake) | TBD | TBD | TBD | TBD |

Note: Rows highlighted in yellow (#FFFF99) represent official world records recognized by Twin Galaxies. Additionally, only world records recognized by Twin Galaxies are considered official.

== Legacy ==
In 2003, Innovative Concepts in Entertainment (ICE) released a remake of the game with new artwork and a ticket dispenser.

Rising-ICB for iOS (2015) is a video game clone of Ice Cold Beer, while TumbleSeed (2017) is based on the Ice Cold Beer mechanics.

56k Games partnered with Taito to release Zeke's Peak on Steam in the Fall of 2019, including an authentic recreation of Ice Cold Beer and Zeke's Peak and featuring dozens of new levels and gameplay mechanics.

Due to enduring popularity, in 2023, Retro Arcade Remake began selling licensed replicas.
