= Puzzlejuice =

2012 video game

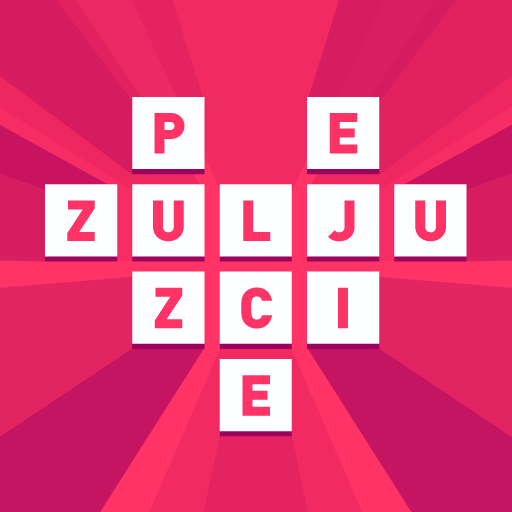
- App icon
- Developer: Sirvo
- Publisher: Sirvo
- Programmer: Asher Vollmer
- Artist: Greg Wohlwend
- Composer: Jimmy Hinson
- Platforms: iOS, Android
- Release: January 19, 2012
- Genre: Puzzle
- Mode: Single-player

Puzzlejuice is a 2012 indie puzzle video game for iOS produced and developed by video game company Sirvo. The game is a combination of Tetris, tile-matching, and Boggle: players rearrange falling tetromino blocks into rows of similar colors, which turn into letters that are cleared from the board by forming words. The fast-paced game also includes challenges and power-ups. The development team consisted of three people; programmer Asher Vollmer initially developed the game alone, before reaching out to artist Greg Wohlwend for advice on the aesthetics. Composer Jimmy Hinson produced the game's music.

The game was released January 19, 2012 to what video game review score aggregator Metacritic called "generally favorable" reviews. Multiple reviewers mentioned the difficulty involved in juggling the three game components simultaneously. The game was released on Android through publisher GameClub on June 19, 2020.

== Gameplay ==
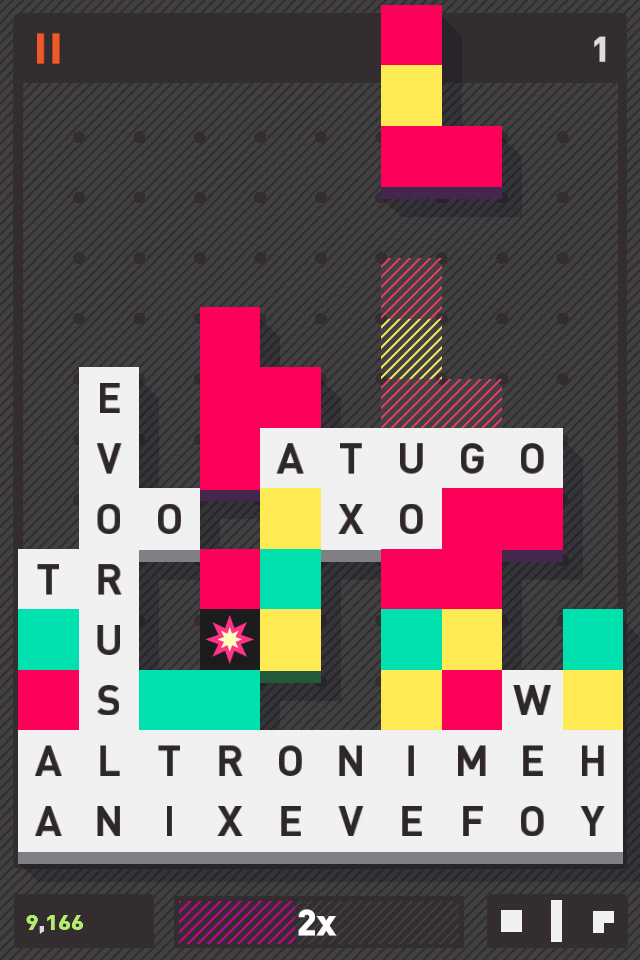
Screenshot of gameplay

In Puzzlejuice, the player turns falling tetrominos into letters, and those letters into words and points. The player taps and drags on the touchscreen to rotate and position multicolored tetrominos that fall from the top of the screen. When the player completes a solid row of tiles, or arranges the fallen blocks such that four or more like-colored tiles touch, the color tiles turn into letters. Players connect these letter tiles with their eight adjacent tiles (in ordinal directions) to make words. Words of sufficient length are cleared from play as well as their adjacent tiles—thus longer words clear more blocks. The iPhone version shows a magnified version of the tile obscured by the player's finger near the finger. The game has been compared to a cross between Boggle, Tetris, and tile-matching.

The game also offers objectives to be accomplished over multiple sessions, like making a six-letter word, or clearing three or more rows at once. This unlocks power-ups that occasionally provide opportunities such as halting the rate of new tetromino drops, and removing blocks from the screen. Up to three power-ups can be selected to be used in each game.

The object of the game is to get the highest score. There are two play modes: Zen and Core. There is a 90-second time limit in Zen mode. In Core mode, players play until the screen fills with poorly placed tetrominos, similar to Tetris. Core has two difficulties. On the easiest difficulty, three-letter words suffice, but harder modes require five-letter words at a minimum. A score multiplier grows as players maintain a combo of multiple words created in succession, and resets if players are too slow. Scores are uploaded to Game Center.

== Development ==
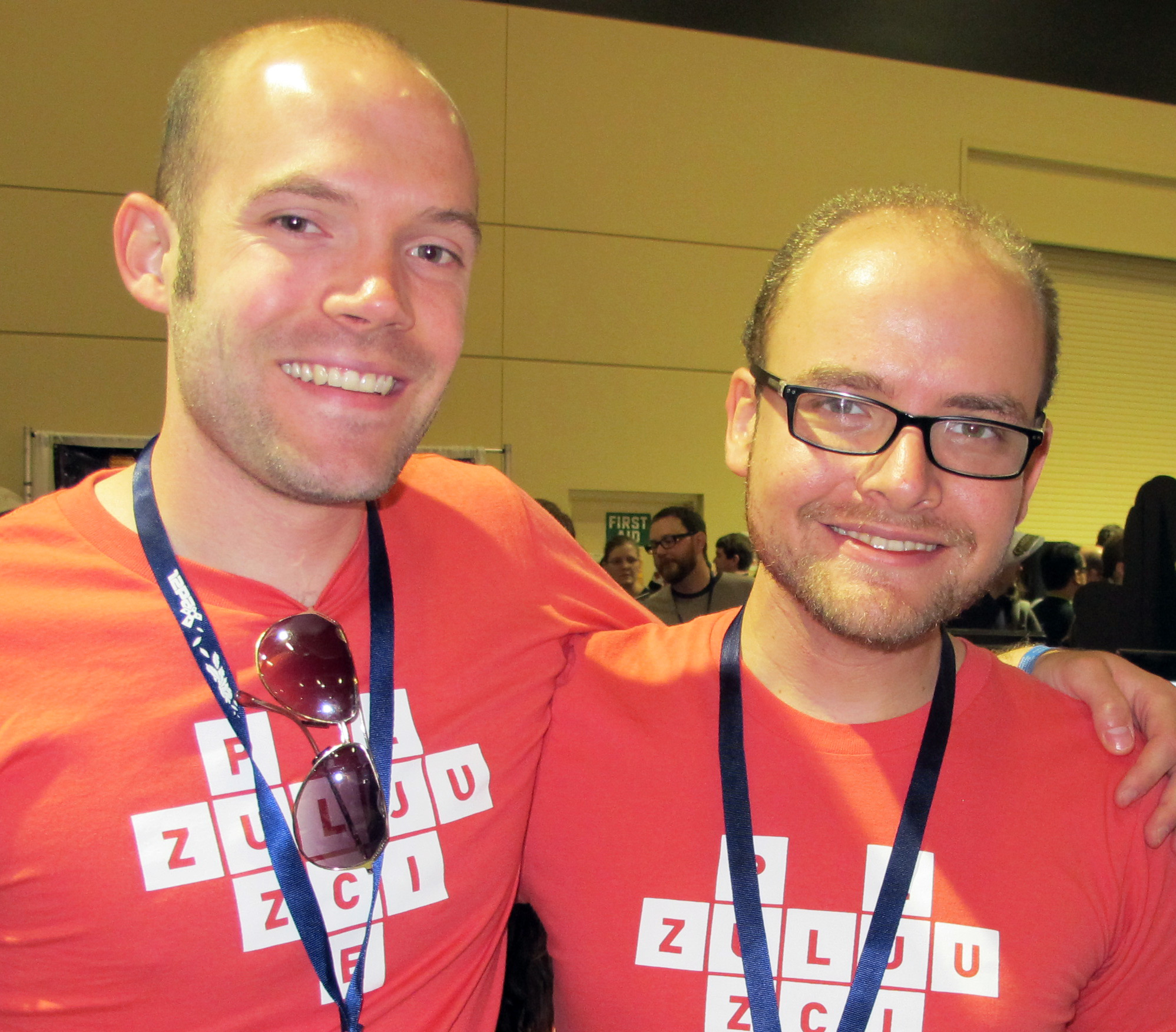
Wohlwend and Vollmer displaying the game at PAX 2012

Puzzlejuice was built by a group called Collaboratory and later renamed Sirvo. The three-person team consisted of programmer Asher Vollmer, artist Greg Wohlwend, and composer Jimmy Hinson. The game began as Vollmer's idea. He later reached out to Wohlwend for aesthetic advice, which resulted in a 365-message chain email and the final product. Wohlwend and Vollmer did not speak a word to each other—or use a medium outside of Gmail and Twitter—throughout the entire development process. The title was inspired by what Vollmer described as the "EXTREME" American culture of the 1990s, exemplified by the board game Crossfire and juice-filled Gushers fruit snacks. A similar game, Spelltower, was released during Puzzlejuice's development, but Vollmer and Wohlwend ultimately considered their game sufficiently different to proceed. Puzzlejuice was selected for the PAX 10, a spotlighted group of indie games, in July 2012. The game was released as a universal app for iPhone and iPad on January 19, 2012. Vollmer expressed an interest in bringing the game to Steam Greenlight in August 2012.

== Reception ==
Reception

Aggregate score
| Aggregator | Score |
|---|---|
| Metacritic | 86/100 |

Review scores
| Publication | Score |
|---|---|
| Edge | 8/10 |
| VideoGamer.com | 8/10 |
| Pocket Gamer | 7/10 |
| Slide to Play | 4/4 |
| TouchArcade | 4.5/5 |

The game received "generally favorable" reviews, according to video game review score aggregator Metacritic. Multiple reviewers compared its core mechanics to a combination of Boggle, Tetris, and a tile-matching game, such as Bejeweled or Puyo Puyo. Comparing word games, Edge called it the "fast-paced action-adventure" to Spelltower's "survival horror". Multiple reviewers mentioned the difficulty in mentally balancing the various components of the game, which VideoGamer.com compared to "doing open heart surgery while playing Dance Dance Revolution".

Edge suggested playing on the game's hardest difficulty, which they found the most engaging. They called it "mayhem, ... elegantly handled". Pocket Gamer's Harry Slater said the game "forces your brain to think in ways that it's never been asked to before". Edge compared the game's challenges to Jetpack Joyride's missions, and complimented the connection between Vollmer's "magpie" design and Wohlwend's "luminously flat pastel-colored art". Phil Eaves of Slide to Play wrote that the player should play with headphones or else miss a "wonderful" chiptune soundtrack.

Edge called the game "too hectic and exhausting" to return to often. VideoGamer.com's Mark Brown struggled with registering the right input on the small screen, and found himself inadvertently making words from letters instead of moving color blocks. Slide to Play's Eaves was also troubled by the controls, and recommended the iPad version for the extra screen space. Pocket Gamer's Slater said it was too easy to clear the board with three-letter words, and thus that the design execution was not as robust as the concept, never being "more than the sum of its strange combination of parts". While TouchArcade's Troy Woodfield called the gameplay "not ... totally original" in how it combines three common game ideas, he still found the combination "a stroke of genius", and highly recommended the game as "a breath of fresh air". Brown of VideoGamer.com agreed that Puzzlejuice distinguished itself from the crowded iOS puzzle game genre, and Slide to Play's Eaves called its balance between game types "perfect".
