= Big Giant Circles =

American musician and composer

- Born: Jimmy Hinson
- Origin: Dallas, Texas, United States
- Genres: IDM, chiptune, electronic, ambient
- Occupations: Musician; composer
- Instruments: Digital audio workstation FL Studio; piano; guitar
- Years active: 2003–present
- Website: biggiantcircles.com

Jimmy Hinson, also known as Big Giant Circles, is an American musician and composer in the video games industry. Originally adopting the name as a hobbyist submitting video game music remixes/rearrangements to OverClocked ReMix, Hinson now actively composes video game soundtracks. He has contributed to the soundtracks of Borderlands 2, Threes!, There Came an Echo, Super Street Fighter II Turbo HD Remix, Call of Duty: Black Ops 2 and Mass Effect 2. Hinson is credited with his work on several independent games including Pocket Mine and Extreme Roadtrip 2, and has contributed to OverClocked ReMix. His style has garnered him praise from Daniel Floyd of Extra Credits and Anthony and Ashly Burch of Hey Ash, Whatcha Playin'?, as well as positive press from Kotaku and GameTrailers.

== Video game music ==
Hinson has composed original soundtracks for several video games including The Haunting of Magnolia Manor, Puzzlejuice, Extreme Road Trip 2, Pocket Mine, Zombocalypse 2, Threes!, There Came an Echo, Journey of 1000 Stars, Hive Jump, and Octogeddon.

He has also made contributions to the soundtracks of Just Shapes & Beats, Borderlands 2, Super Street Fighter II Turbo HD Remix, Mass Effect 2, Call of Duty: Black Ops 2, Call of Duty: Black Ops Cold War and Call of Duty: Black Ops 6 (the latter four under lead composer Jack Wall). Mass Effect 2 was nominated for a BAFTA Game award for Best Original Music.

== Independent work ==
Hinson additionally composes chiptune-styled music as an independent musician. His debut independent album, Impostor Nostalgia, was released for digital distribution on September 12, 2011.

Hinson's latest project is his second album, The Glory Days, released on February 14, 2014, after being successfully funded on the crowdfunding website Kickstarter, raising $62,778 from an intended goal of $5,000. A remix album, The Glory Days Remixed, was released on August 27, 2014, and includes music from Disasterpeace (composer for Fez), Austin Wintory (composer for Journey), C418 (composer for Minecraft), Danny Baranowsky, and others.

In 2017, one of Hinson's songs for There Came an Echo was reused as thematic music in the second season of Netflix original TV series Stranger Things.

== Discography ==
=== Studio albums ===
- Impostor Nostalgia (2011)
- The Glory Days (2014)

=== Compilation albums ===
- Contingency (2011)
- Legacy (2012)
- Official Video Game Music Demo Reel (2014)
- The Glory Days Remixed (2014)

=== Soundtrack albums ===
- The Haunting of Magnolia Manor Soundtrack (2011)
- Puzzlejuice Soundtrack (2012)
- Max Effect (2012)
- Extreme Road Trip 2 Soundtrack (2012)
- Pocket Mine Soundtrack (2013)
- Zombocalypse 2 Soundtrack (2013)
- Extreme Bike Trip OST (2014)
- Threes OST (2014)
- There Came an Echo (2015)
- Journey of 1000 Stars OST (2016)
- Hive Jump (2017)
- Octogeddon (2018)
- Road Quest (2020)

=== Extended plays ===
- Big Giant Christmas EP (2011)

=== Singles ===
- 2011: "You Can Have Mine"
- 2012: "Nerd Appropriate Theme"
- 2013: "Bionic Commando – At Arm's Length"

=== Remixes ===
- 2011: Danny Baranowsky – "The Clubbing of Isaac" – The Binding of Isaac
- 2011: Josh Whelchel – "Scourge of Estellion" – Ravenmark: Scourge of Estellion

=== Guest appearances ===
- 2014: "Infinity" (Alexander Brandon featuring Big Giant Circles) – Just Fun
- 2015: "Jimtention" (C418 and Big Giant Circles) – 148
