= Solipskier =

2010 video game

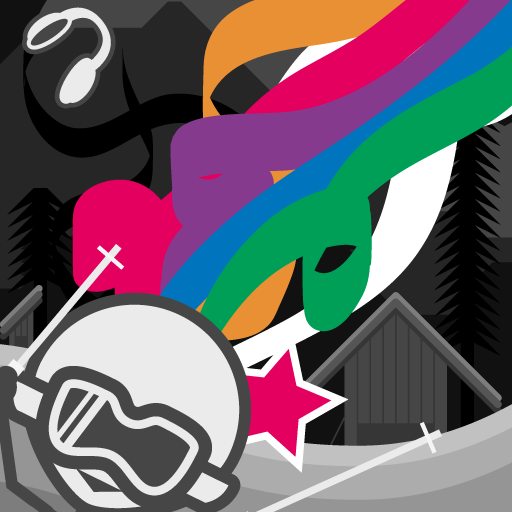
- App icon
- Developer: Mikengreg
- Publisher: Kongregate
- Platforms: Adobe Flash, iOS, Android
- Release: Flash, iOS August 29, 2010; Android November 2010
- Genre: Sports
- Mode: Single-player

Solipskier is a sports video game for Adobe Flash, iOS, and Android developed and published by Mikengreg, the two-person team of Michael Boxleiter and Greg Wohlwend. In Solipskier, the player draws the snowy slope for an on-screen skier to pass through slalom gates and tunnels. The character accelerates with downhill sections and can launch into the air to perform tricks and earn a higher score. The idea came from a brainstorming session about parallax scrolling with speedy action in the foreground and the ability for the player to "paint" the terrain. It was Boxleiter and Wohlwend's first game to receive public appreciation. It was released August 29, 2010 to generally favorable reviews and was a runner-up in the 2011 Game Developers Conference Independent Games Festival's Best Mobile Game category.

== Gameplay ==
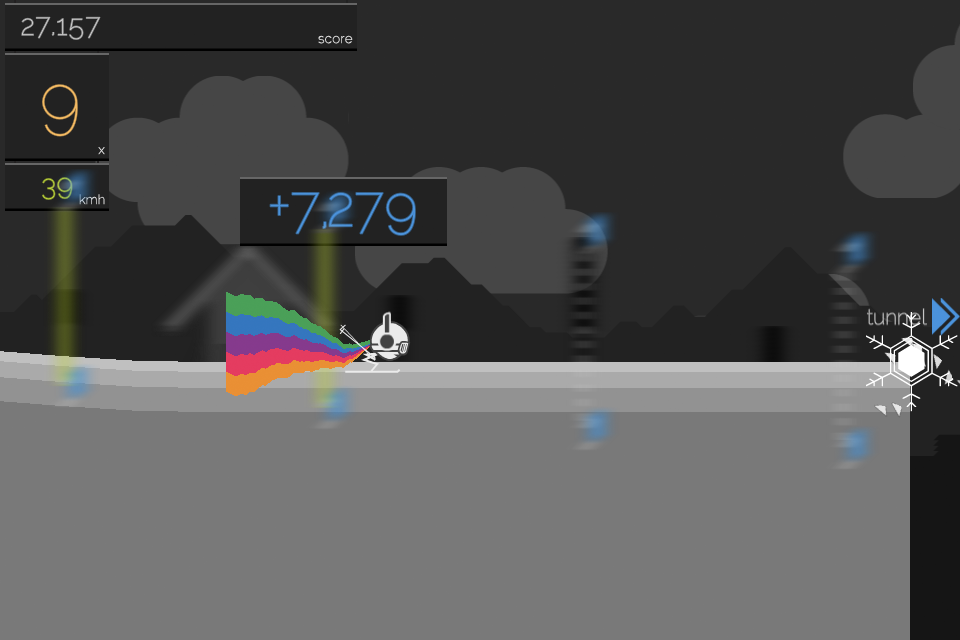
Screenshots of gameplay and video of Wohlwend's high score

In the sports game Solipskier, the player draws the ground for the on-screen skier to pass through a level filled with gates, tunnels, and walls. Drawing an incline, for example, will launch the skier into the air to perform tricks, and a downhill section will accelerate the skier. Upcoming obstacles are indicated at the right of the screen along with the necessary altitude and distance. A streak of successful passes through gates will accrue a bonus score. The skier's speed also increases with time. As an endless runner (compared to Canabalt), the characters advance until they die, as there is no end. If the skier travels fast enough, he loses his headphones, which cuts out the background music to the sound of the wind passing by. The player receives "All Star Dunk Contest-like scorecards" after landing big jumps. Solipskier also has an online leaderboard, and offers tips for new players to improve their scores. It focuses on style and emotion from the player-character's terminal speed rather than on jumps and tricks. It also has a hard rock guitar soundtrack.

== Development ==
Solipskier was designed for the Adobe Flash platform. Michael Boxleiter and Greg Wohlwend had worked on Flash games earlier as Intuition Games. The idea for the game came from a brainstorming session about parallax scrolling, and was revised in fits of creativity. They paired the parallax scrolling with speed, and eventually Boxleiter "blurted out with wide-eyes" that the player could "paint the terrain to determine the speed of the character". They chose a snow or snowmobile theme and began to prototype that same night. Boxleiter used skills he had acquired from previous games (heightmaps from Dinowaurs and bitmap drawing from EON) to make a mockup within hours: a red ball that moved along with a slope (made with the mouse) and floated down slowly when suspended in air. He added three gates to create a slalom skiing course and a sense of distance and speed, which was not apparent otherwise. Boxleiter then set up indicators to show the incoming gates, though he thought it was odd to have the indicators move to the right as the gate moved to towards the player (to the left). There was no parallax scrolling implemented in this phase.

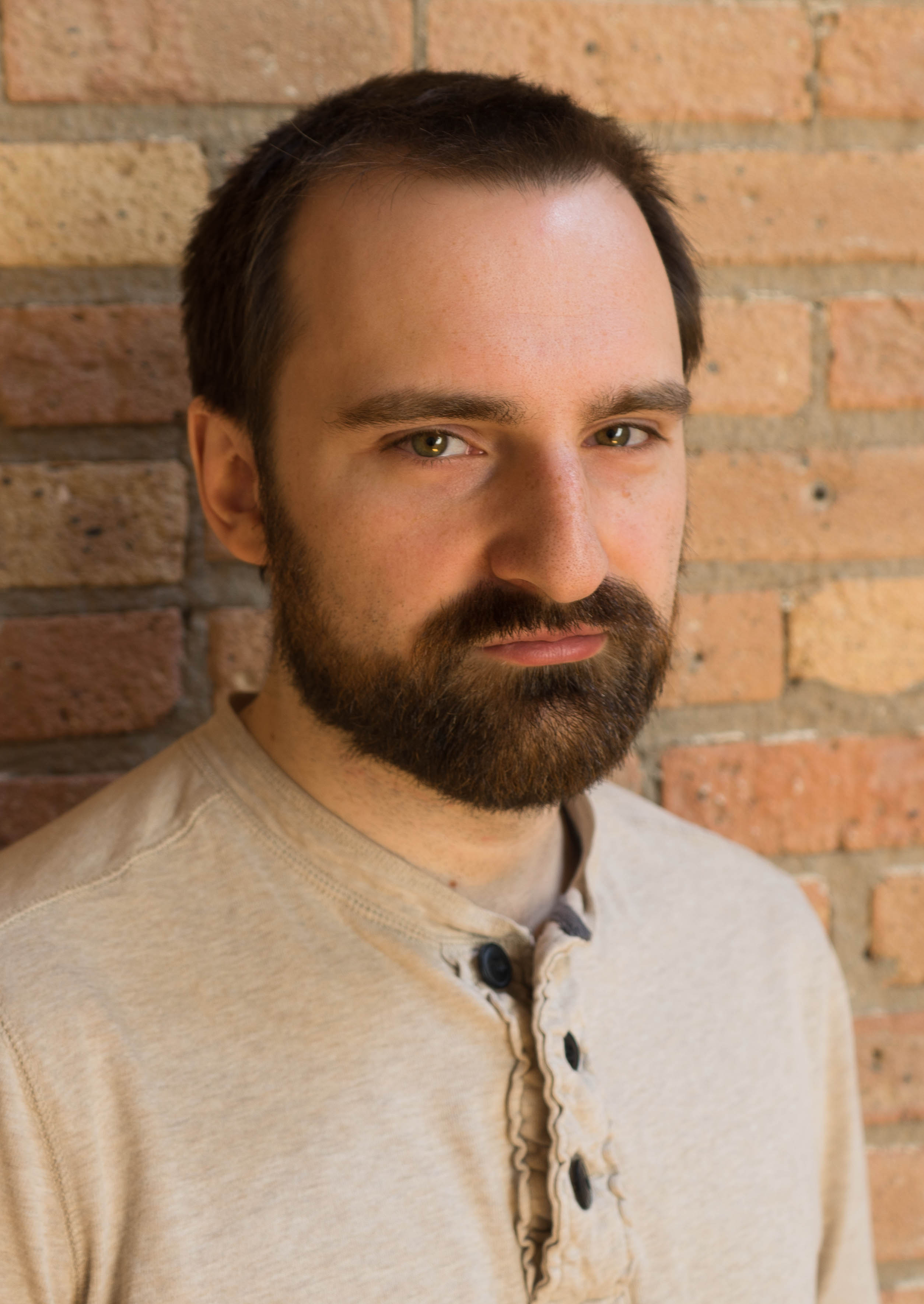
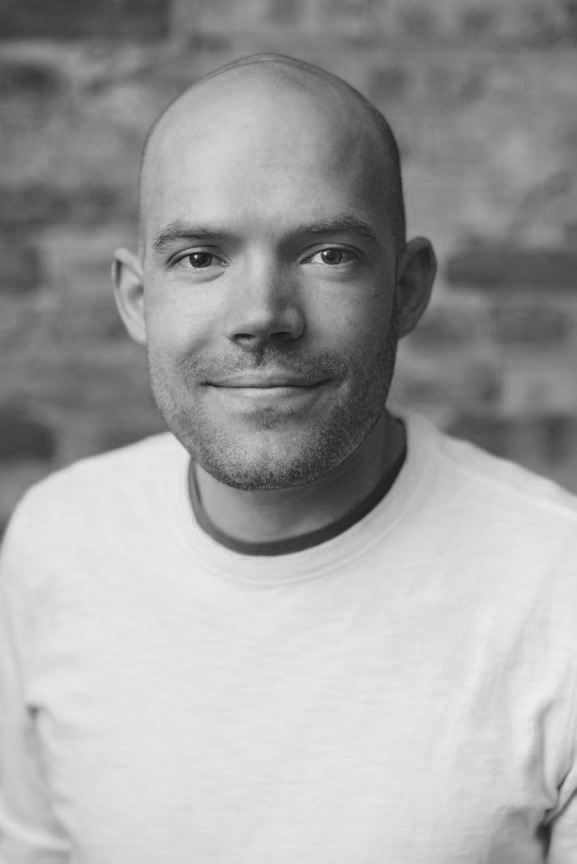
Mike Boxleiter and Greg Wohlwend

Meanwhile, Wohlwend mocked up a 2D course in grayscale, (Note: Wohlwend has said that he prefers to add color where necessary following a grayscale mockup.) with humps of mountains. He originally designed the visuals such that there would be nothing on the screen where the player had not painted, which was later cut. After seeing Boxleiter's draft, he used crisp colors to make distinct gate markers and made the foreground highly contrast with the background. Their early drafts had a nighttime theme and included an aurora that was later cut due to difficulty of implementation in Flash. Wohlwend left the character design for last as his "weak point". Boxleiter was particularly inspired by the idea of a skier replacing the snowmobile, and set up the parallax scrolling and motion blur, which made the skier appear to go faster. He also added the "tunnel" idea as a series of gates. They animated the skier, who they gave an "ego-tastic" large head on a stick figure body, and decided to not use tutorials, opting for a game that began with the player's first click. (Note: Both developers did not like hand-holding in tutorials, which influenced their decision. They found that the player usually fell to their death immediately on their first run, but they felt it served its purpose.) Wohlwend's rainbow trail effect was added as a scarf or cape (which later became a rainbow burst behind the player), and the scoring mechanics were refined to reward players who took risks by letting the skier fly through the air without touching the screen. This was partly inspired by the Tony Hawk's Pro Skater series. The title refers to a combination of solipsism and skiing.

The game was their first to receive public appreciation. Boxleiter first understood its potential when publishers fought for the bid to the game. At the time, it was solely designed for Flash and not iOS, though they were interested in making bigger games outside the Flash market. They announced the game in mid August 2010, where they revealed that the game would release on Flash (through Kongregate) and iOS simultaneously, (Note: As an iOS universal app, the game plays on both iPhone and iPad.) which happened on August 29, 2010. Joe Bergeron, a programmer who had previously worked on Dinowaurs with Mikengreg, helped with the iOS version of the game. Solipskier made around $70,000 in its first two months (as compared to $15,000 from the Flash release), which let them work in other non-Flash mediums in the future. They released an Android version three months later.

== Reception ==
Reception

Aggregate score
Aggregator	Score
Metacritic	79/100

Review scores
Publication	Score
Eurogamer	8/10
IGN	7.5/10
148 Apps	4.5/5
Slide to Play	3/4

The game received "generally favorable" reviews, according to video game review score aggregator Metacritic. It was a runner-up in the 2011 Game Developers Conference Independent Games Festival's Best Mobile Game category. IGN's Levi Buchanan praised the art direction, especially the rainbow scarf against the gray, monotone background. Chris Hall of 148Apps called it "the most original since Fastar". Hall praised the touch of having the headphones fall off, with the contrast between the hard rock guitar and the rushing natural wind, but criticized the complex scoring system. Edge's Chris Donlan, on the other hand, appreciated the trade-offs between the different opportunities to score higher. Hall of 148Apps added that Solipskier did not look as great on a Retina Display. Tim Rattray of Slide to Play called the graphics "pure eye candy". He felt that the game was "unique, but a 'one-trick pony' combination of fast Canabalt and platform-drawing Line Racer". Likewise, IndieGames.com felt Solipskier's novelty was ephemeral. Pocket Gamer's Mark Brown called its difficulty "steeper than the Alps". Pocket Gamer listed the game as one of the toughest and best indie games in 2011, one of the best endless runners in 2012, and a "hidden gem" in 2013.
