= Hundreds (video game) =

2013 video game

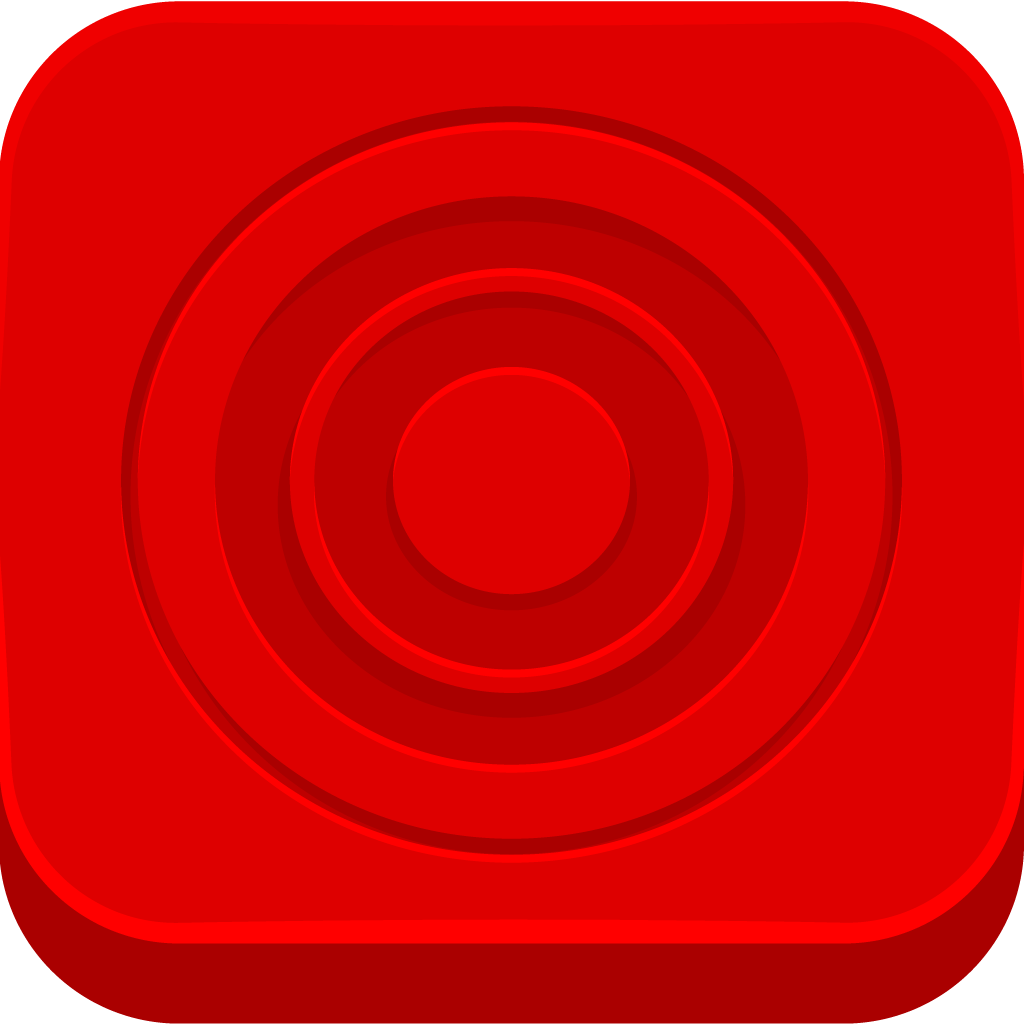
- App icon
- Developer: Semi Secret
- Publisher: Semi Secret
- Platforms: iOS, Android
- Release: iOS; January 7, 2013; Android; June 28, 2013
- Genre: Puzzle
- Mode: Single-player

Hundreds is a puzzle video game where players touch circles to make them grow without overlapping. In the game's 100 levels, the player interacts with different types of circles to bring a counter to the number 100. The game was developed and published by Semi Secret Software in collaboration with Greg Wohlwend and was released for iOS on January 7, 2013, and on Android later that year.

It was originally built for Adobe Flash in 2010 as indie game artist Wohlwend's first self-developed game. The game idea came from staring at the ceiling, and Wohlwend applied a grayscale color palette from his first year in art school. When Flash game sites did not purchase the title, he open sourced the code. Eric Johnson of Semi Secret ported the game to iPad, which began a collaboration between Wohlwend and the company's Adam Saltsman, who became the primary puzzle designer.

The game received "generally favorable" reviews, according to video game review score aggregator Metacritic. It was an honorable mention in Best Mobile Game and Nuovo Award categories of the 2012 Independent Games Festival, their honorable mention in Excellence in Visual Art the next year, and an official selection at IndieCade 2012. Reviewers praised its minimalist design aesthetic and puzzle variety, and criticized its obtuse cryptography subgame. Ian Bogost wrote that the game functioned like a design object, a feat unique for the video game medium.

== Gameplay ==
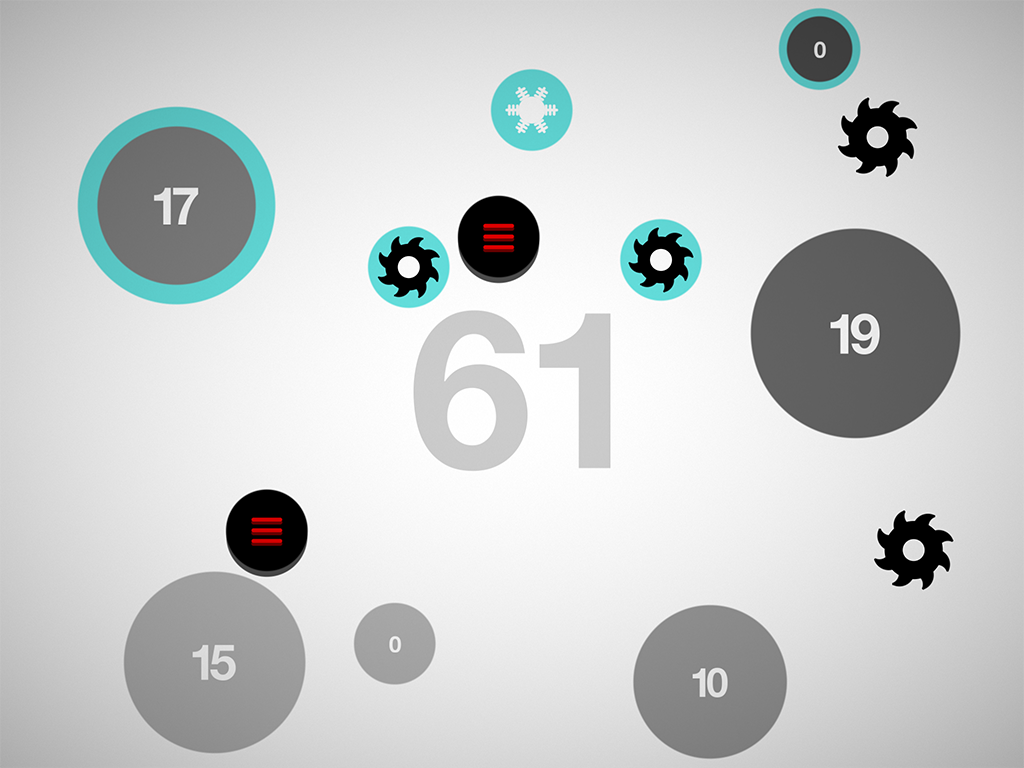
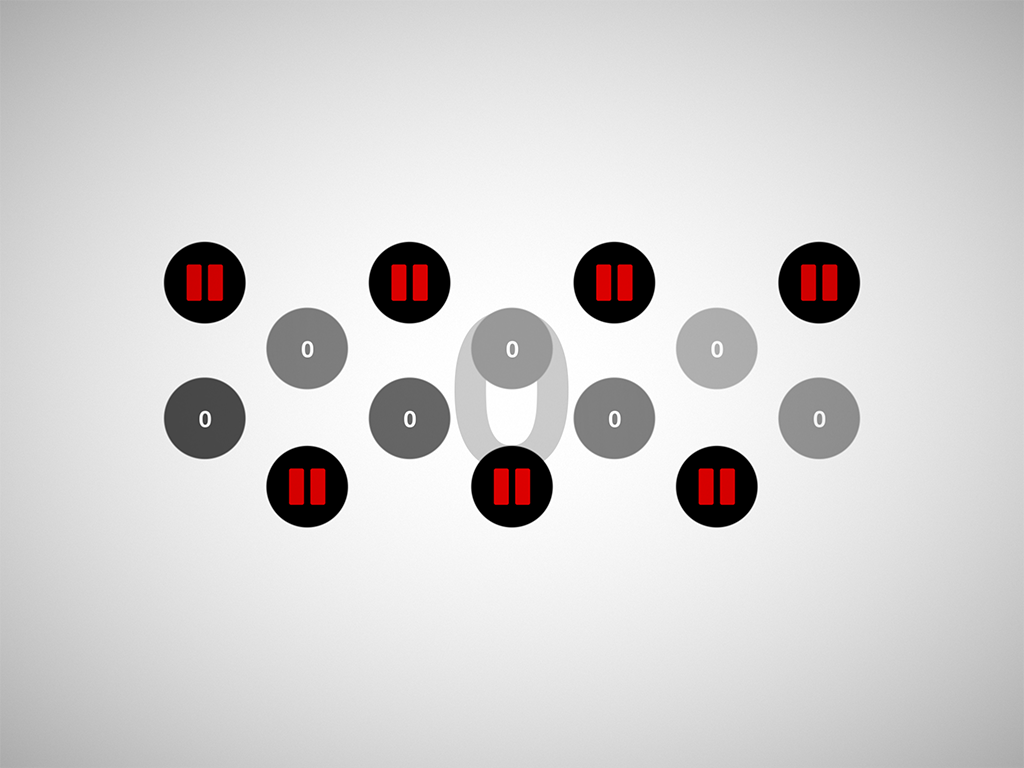
Gameplay screenshots

Players touch circles onscreen to make them grow in size. Numbers within the circles count upwards with the duration of the touch. If a growing circle overlaps another, the player must restart the puzzle. Levels are completed when the numbers within the circles total 100. There are 100 levels that progress in complexity from a simple circle with no nearby obstructions to the advanced mechanics, such as linked circles that need to be touched at once, buzzsaws that reset the numbers within the circles, and snowflakes that freeze other circles.

The game has no pause feature or motion controls, and there is no formal tutorial. Hidden between the puzzles are a few ciphers—incomprehensible text to be decoded through substitution cipher and other methods. The endless mode unlocks when the 100 puzzles are complete, and features a series of randomly generated levels.

== Development ==
Hundredswas developed by Semi Secret Software: Adam Saltsman of Canabalt, Greg Wohlwend of Puzzlejuice, composer Scott Morgan (also known as Loscil), and developer Eric Johnson.

I imagined growing a circle as large as possible without having them touch whilst growing. The victory/death case was so intrinsically linked I could play it in my head and feel how much patience it would take in certain cases.

— Wohlwend, creator of Hundreds, January 2013

Wohlwend originally built Hundreds as a Flash game. As an artist, he wanted to experiment with game programming following his release of Solipskier with programmer Mike Boxleiter. He developed the game from an idea he had while staring at a ceiling, where he imagined a circle growing without overlapping another when growing. He found this to be a good core game concept and based the game around "patience and persistence". The game's style inadvertently borrowed from his first year in art school, where Wohlwend composed in black, white, and red so as to focus on composition rather than color. The Flash version was released in 2010 and is available online at Newgrounds. The Flash version was much simpler in design, and added circles onscreen as the game progressed. This gameplay evolved into what became the iOS release.

Though Wohlwend describes his interest in "simple and elegant" game design as permeating his works, Hundreds's minimalism was also functional due to his inexperience with programming. The code was "brute forced" and written in a single file. It was the first game he programmed, though he had some assistance with the in-game physics. Wohlwend wanted the game to be purchased by a Flash game site like Kongregate or Newgrounds. When the sites were not interested, he chose to open source his code, partly with the intent to spur "non-coders" to try coding, as he had. At the time, Semi Secret Software was in a lull between projects.

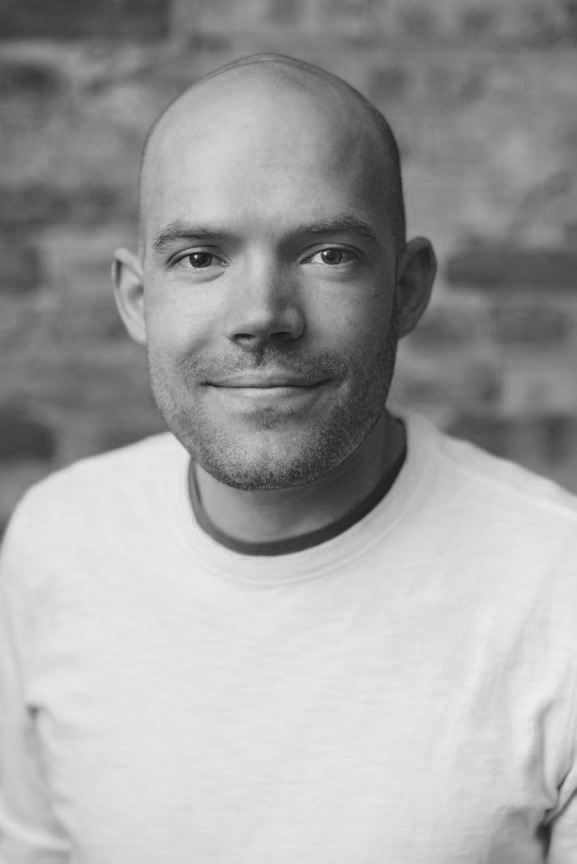
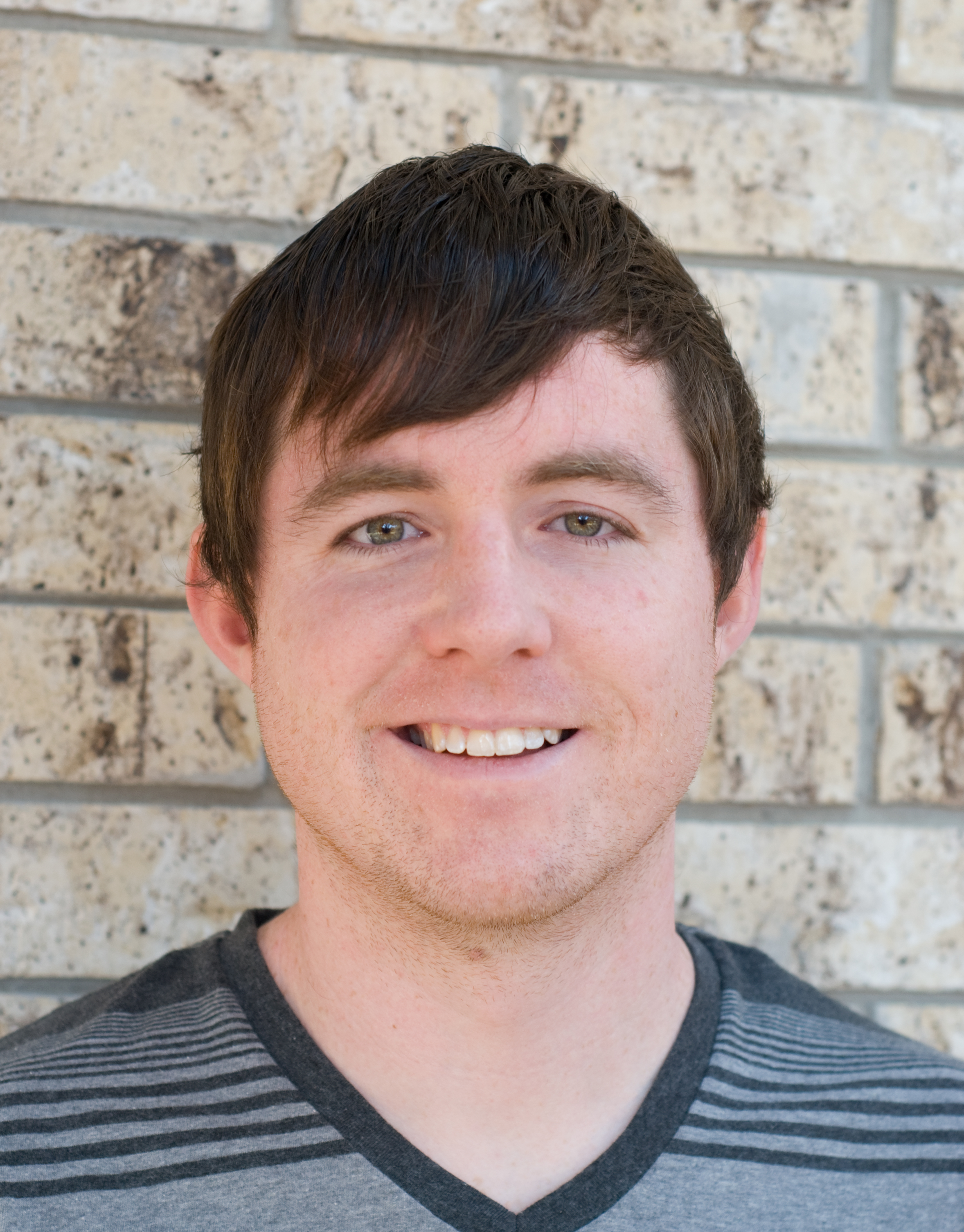
Wohlwend and Saltsman

Programmer Eric Johnson of Semi Secret found the open source version and ported the game to iPad in a weekend before notifying Wohlwend. At the time, Wohlwend did not have an iOS device to test the port, and had to purchase an iPad. Johnson's iPad version spurred Wohlwend to consider how Hundreds would work with multitouch and cooperative play, and Semi Secret's Adam Saltsman to consider a Hundreds collaboration, especially as the company lacked the funds to work on a new game from scratch. They began to work towards an iOS release. Saltsman expected Wohlwend to work with Johnson to finish the game in a few months by adding new "circle types" and designing 100 discrete puzzles, but extended that estimate and joined the project himself in that time. Wohlwend and Saltsman extended the game's mechanics with new circles and puzzles, but their results were clunky. Saltsman recalled wanting to add atop the game's "basic building blocks", which took them off-track after a few months and took a few additional months to recover. Wohlwend wanted to make the game easier than the Flash version and so proposed ten new circles that were not adopted. However, he was happy with the final result and credited the game's "emergent interaction" qualities to Saltsman. They built on each other's level designs, though Wohlwend said that Saltsman made "basically all the levels". The new team enjoyed working with each other.

The core differences between the Flash and iOS versions are a new endless mode and a narrative element based on ciphers and codes. The latter feature spiraled from email conversations between Wohlwend and Saltsman about a "really obtuse and weird" subgame that functioned as a story. Wohlwend credited Saltsman with the idea of a Brave New World-style fiction within the game that used ciphers, though the idea was also influenced by a similar plot element in Dash Shaw's Bottomless Belly Button. The endless mode was added about six months into development. They hoped the game's presentation conveyed "honest and confident rather than overly mysterious and weird". The team was also inspired by Superbrothers: Sword & Sworcery EP's boldness.

Hundreds was first announced at the 2012 Game Developers Conference and "reannounced" later that year following changes in its presentation. It was released on January 7, 2013 for iPhone and iPad, and on June 28 for Android. It was later added to the November 2013 Humble Mobile Bundle 3. The composer released a compilation of remixes of the Hundreds track as 100 Minutes on Bandcamp in June 2013.

== Reception ==
Reception

Aggregate score
Aggregator	Score
Metacritic	85/100

Review scores
Publication	Score
Edge	7/10
Eurogamer	8/10
Game Informer	8/10
Gamekult	7/10
Gamezebo	5/5
Hyper	5/10
MacLife	5/5
Macworld	4/5
Pocket Gamer	3/5
TouchArcade	5/5
Digital Spy	3/5

The iOS version received "generally favorable" reviews, according to video game review score aggregator Metacritic. It was an honorable mention in Best Mobile Game and Nuovo Award categories of the 2012 Game Developers Conference Independent Games Festival, and an honorable mention in Excellence in Visual Art at the 2013 festival. Hundreds was also an official selection at IndieCade 2012.

Reviewers noted the game's unadorned nature. Edge called it "handsomely austere", "modish", and "elegant". Dan Ryckert of Game Informer complimented its simplicity, and The Guardian's Stuart Dredge found the game's minimalism "stylish" and its gameplay "genuinely hypnotic". Eurogamer's Dan Whitehead said the game was "basically interactive porn for graphic designers". Nissa Campbell of TouchArcade wrote that its red, gray, and black graphics were "striking" albeit not flashy, and that the game was interesting "visually, aurally, and mechanically". In a piece for The Atlantic, Ian Bogost wrote that its game, visual, and interaction design "embodied an elegant minimalism" akin to the Bauhausian aesthetic promoted by Apple. He added that Hundreds had cultural cachet "unprecedented" in the medium of video games and similar to that of other design objects—that the game was closer to Prada or a lobby bar than to Angry Birds. Bogost felt that it required an amount of attention unlike other "time-waster" mobile games, and referred to the precarious strategies required to complete some levels as a "multi-touch ballet".

Edge thought the game to be "an astoundingly harmonious mix of art and design" and said its "simple premise" is "perfectly suited for a multitouch screen". The magazine noted that the game occasionally becomes one of patience and not skill due to the degree of entropy in each level. Ryckert noted Hundreds as one of the better examples of games that successfully "embraced the simplicity of touch control", such that translation to traditional controller would be "virtually impossible". He appreciated the way the game slowly introduced the new circle types, though he did not like how his hand occasionally obscured the screen. (For this reason, reviewers preferred the iPad version for its larger screen.) Multiple reviewers liked how the game continually renewed itself with the slow introduction of new game elements, though Harry Slater of Pocket Gamer described the core gameplay as "one-note" and criticized its lack of addictive loops that keep players interested. Mike Rose of Gamasutra compared the game as the inverse of Jezzball.

Multiple reviewers noted Hundreds' variety of puzzles and endgame difficulty. Edge commented that the "arcane codes" and puzzles with prescribed solutions made the game's pacing "unusual" when compared to the other puzzles designed to be completed leisurely. Slater too felt the pacing was "swift but uninspiring", and Whitehead called its rhythm "weird" as he waited for the right opportunity some puzzles and could finish others with a single trick. Ryckert also found the final puzzles too aggravating, especially the ones with invisible elements. Campbell appreciated the variety of puzzles from "twitch" to "slow and thoughtful" to, her favorite, the "cerebral" puzzles that required specific tricks as well as the ability to skip puzzles. She also found the last level nigh impossible. Multiple reviewers felt that the cipher puzzles were out of place, and TouchArcade said it was easy to ignore them as what felt like an "utterly distinct" game. Bogost thought that the hidden ciphers were the "surest clue" of its status as "a design object and not a consumable media experience". Slater wrote that the ciphers felt forced and unexciting, and was disappointed overall in consideration of "the incredible talent involved". Whitehead called the puzzles "deftly constructed" and said the game "delights more than it frustrates". Wired's Ryan Rigney wrote that Hundreds distinguished itself among iOS puzzle games in its style and design.
