= Sweet Baby Inc. =

Canadian narrative development and consultation studio

- Type: Private
- Industry: Video games
- Founded: 2018; 8 years ago in Montreal, Canada
- Founders: Kim Belair; David Bédard
- Headquarters: Montreal, Canada
- Key people: Kim Belair (CEO)
- Number of employees: 16 (2024)
- Website: sweetbabyinc.com

Sweet Baby Inc. is a Canadian narrative development and consultation studio based in Montreal. Founded by former Ubisoft developers, including scriptwriter Kim Belair and product manager David Bédard, the company consults on video game narratives during development to promote diversity, equity, and inclusion within game narratives and studios. Sweet Baby has consulted with several developers and games, including Sable, God of War Ragnarök, and Alan Wake 2. In 2023, the studio became the target of online users who claimed it promoted a "woke agenda".

== History ==
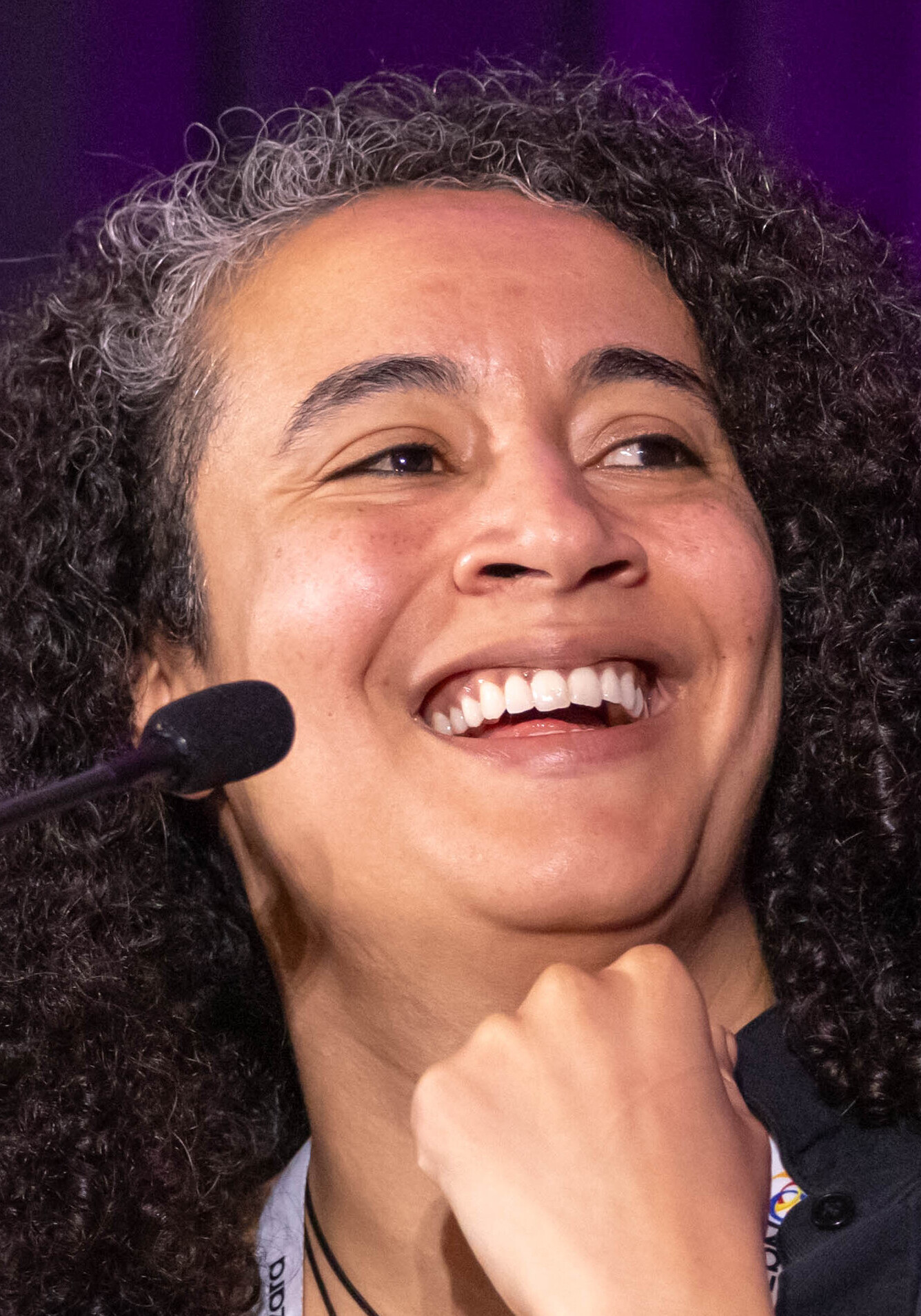
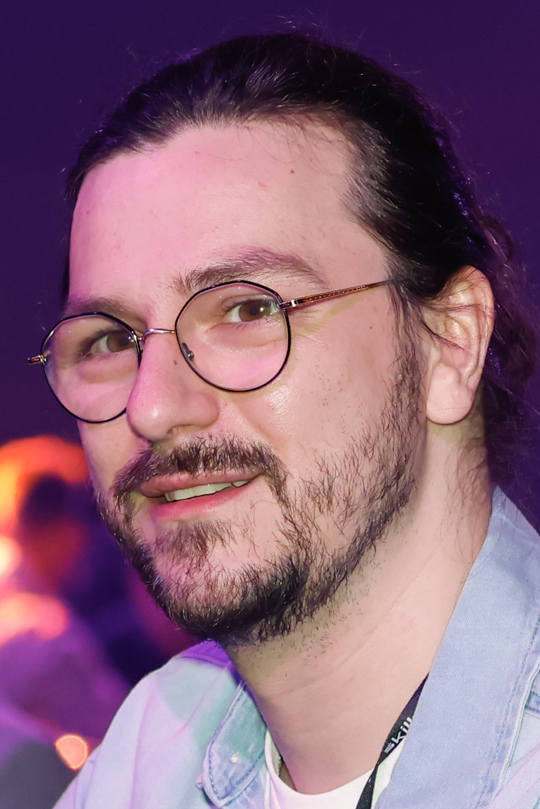
Sweet Baby Inc. was co-founded by CEO Kim Belair (left) and COO David Bédard (right).

Sweet Baby Inc. was founded in Montreal in 2018 by former Ubisoft developers, including scriptwriter Kim Belair and product manager David Bédard. Belair became Sweet Baby's chief executive officer and Bédard the chief operating officer. Belair said that she founded the company to promote the advancement of women and marginalized groups in the video game industry. The company consults on game narratives during development and promotes gender and racial diversity in development teams, including correct and consistent pay, training, and credits.

Sweet Baby's stated goal is to ensure characters from different demographic groups are not only added for nominal presence, but that their portrayal is respectful, fits into the overall context, and is written for quality scenarios. To achieve this, Sweet Baby organizes developer consultations with representatives of different ethnic groups and cultures when creating characters from these same cultures. The company connects developers with studios when vacancies arise. While the studio can be consulted at any point in development, Belair felt it had a better chance at improvement by entering early to avoid undoing completed work.

From 2018, Bédard was the brand content manager and Belair the story architect on Unknown 9, a transmedia project encompassing comics, novels, and video games, initially as employees of developer Reflector Entertainment and later as part of Sweet Baby. The studio consulted on the narrative and characters of God of War Ragnarök, focusing on making the black character Angrboda more relatable to black audiences while acknowledging the game's Norse mythology. Sweet Baby joined the development of Goodbye Volcano High in 2020 and led the narrative team after development rebooted in 2021.

In 2022, the studio developed Lost Your Marbles for the Playdate handheld console, and formed two teams of around twelve people to assist in the development of two other Playdate games over the course of six months: Recommendation Dog and Reel Steel. Bédard felt undertaking two projects simultaneously was "a bit too ambitious" for the studio due to their differing production schedules. The studio joined Afterlove EP as consultants after the death of writer and designer Mohammad Fahmi in 2022, having been speaking with Fahmi before his death. Belair assisted Remedy Entertainment in refining the background and story arc of Saga Anderson, the protagonist of Alan Wake 2, and worked with A44 Games in developing Nor Vanek, the protagonist of Flintlock: The Siege of Dawn. The studio joined the production of Suicide Squad: Kill the Justice League late in its development, focusing on writing audio logs, non-player character dialogue, and in-game advertisements. Sweet Baby was also involved in writing the script for Marvel's Spider-Man 2. As of April 2024, Sweet Baby had 16 employees.

== Online backlash and harassment ==
In October 2023, Sweet Baby attracted negative attention on Kiwi Farms, a web forum where a user described the company's involvement with Alan Wake 2 as "possibly one of the biggest scandals in gaming history"; similar posts were shared on sites like 4chan and the Reddit community r/KotakuInAction. Employees said a small degree of harassment was directed towards the company following this attention, which increased in January 2024, when a Brazilian Steam user created a curator group listing Sweet Baby's work, encouraging players to avoid the games as the studio promoted a "woke agenda". The curator group, known as "Sweet Baby Inc detected", received increased attention in February when a Sweet Baby employee asked others to report it for violating Steam's code of conduct. By April, the group had more than 355,000 followers and a related Discord server had thousands of members. Both underwent purges of content in order to stay online after Steam and Discord staff contacted their moderators about potentially violating terms of service, as much of the user-driven content bordered on hate speech. Belair said Sweet Baby did not contact Steam's owner, Valve, regarding the group.

Theories about the studio included that it was directly or indirectly controlled by companies like BlackRock or Vanguard for environmental, social, and governance investments, that it forced Remedy to make Alan Wake 2's Saga Anderson black (which game director Kyle Rowley denied), and that it was responsible for recent failures in high-profile games such as Suicide Squad (Note: Several journalists countered that Suicide Squad's mixed critical response was due to its combat gameplay and live service mechanics—on which Sweet Baby Inc. had no input—rather than its writing.) and for recent industry layoffs. Characterised as conspiracy theories by journalists and scholars, these disproven ideas were based on isolated statements made by Sweet Baby employees on social media or at conferences, taken out of the larger context related to their views on diversity in game narratives. Aftermath's Nathan Grayson noted theories would likely continue spreading as long as their narrative compelled viewers and readers; YouTube videos about the backlash collectively received millions of views. Belair responded that Sweet Baby's work was to improve narratives generally rather than being solely focused on diversity and inclusion; she noted gamers thought the studio had simply added pride flags to Marvel's Spider-Man 2 when it had actually provided narrative work for about three years, including several levels and character arcs.

Sweet Baby's employees faced harassment and attempted doxing in response to the backlash, with attention drawn towards the company and its employees by high-profile social media accounts including Elon Musk, Matt Walsh, and Libs of TikTok. Others who faced harassment included Kotaku's reporter who first highlighted the backlash and developers who worked with or publicly supported Sweet Baby. Several journalists and content creators compared it to Gamergate, and TheGamer's Stacey Henley called it "the latest dogwhistle for rejecting progressive ideas". Scholars described the Discord group an incubator for misogyny, akin to the manosphere, and The Verge's Ash Parrish said its members were not attempting to "create meaningful change for their cause" but were "simply there for the vibes, rancid though they are". The studio continued to operate as normal; Bédard felt the industry had become familiar with similar controversies since Gamergate. Its partners, like Insomniac Games, offered advice on moving past the backlash based on their own experiences with harassment, and several developers and consultants, like Rami Ismail and Steve Saylor, supported the studio on social media. Journalists and academics urged the studio's other partners to publicly defend it to stop false accusations and avoid complicity, and Game Developer's Bryant Francis urged Steam and Discord to clarify their policies to avoid similar incidents and further harassment.

== List of games ==
Year	Game	Developer	Role	Ref.
2019	Neo Cab	Chance Agency	Writing	
2020	Dota Underlords	Valve	Scriptwriting	
2020	Assassin's Creed Valhalla	Ubisoft Montreal	Scriptwriting	
2021	Dungeons & Dragons: Dark Alliance	Tuque Games	Scriptwriting	
2021	Space Tow Truck	Eric Laflamme	Writing and narrative design	
2021	Sable	Shedworks	Writing and characters	
2022	Lost Your Marbles	Sweet Baby Inc.	Full development	
2022	Gotham Knights	WB Games Montréal	Scriptwriting	
2022	God of War Ragnarök	Santa Monica Studio	Narrative and character consultation	
2023	Recommendation Dog	Sweet Baby Inc.	Full development	
2023	Reel Steal	Sweet Baby Inc.	Full development	
2023	Shadow Gambit: The Cursed Crew	Mimimi Games	Sensitivity reading	
2023	Goodbye Volcano High	KO_OP	Narrative direction, design, writing, sensitivity reading	
2023	Quantum Phantom Basketball	Brenda Arts	Writing and production	
2023	The Crew Motorfest	Ubisoft Ivory Tower	Proofreading, additional writing	
2023	Kingdom Eighties	Fury Studios	Additional writing	
2023	Marvel's Spider-Man 2	Insomniac Games	Story consultation	
2023	Alan Wake 2	Remedy Entertainment	Characters, sensitivity reading	
2024	Suicide Squad: Kill the Justice League	Rocksteady Studios	Scriptwriting (audio logs, non-player characters)	
2024	Tales of Kenzera: Zau	Surgent Studios	Narrative	
2024	Capes	Spitfire Interactive	Character consultation	
2024	Flintlock: The Siege of Dawn	A44 Games	Writing and characters	
2024	Battle Shapers	Metric Empire	Narrative direction, design, writing, world	
2025	Afterlove EP	Pikselnesia	Narrative design and writing	
2025	South of Midnight	Compulsion Games	Story development, cultural and character consultation	
2025	Henry Halfhead	Lululu Entertainment	Narrative consulting	
2025	Winter Burrow	Pine Creek Games	Writing	
2026	Relooted	Nyamakop	Narrative design	
2026	Blueberry	Mellow Games	Narrative consulting	
2026	Marvel's Wolverine	Insomniac Games	Story consultation	
2027	Usual June	Finji	Narrative and characters	
TBA	Breeze in the Clouds	Stormy Nights Interactive	Narrative design and consultation	
Cancelled	Contraband	Avalanche Studios	Sensitivity reading, scriptwriting	
Cancelled	Hyper Light Breaker	Heart Machine	Story structure and character development	
