= Adam Saltsman =

American video game designer

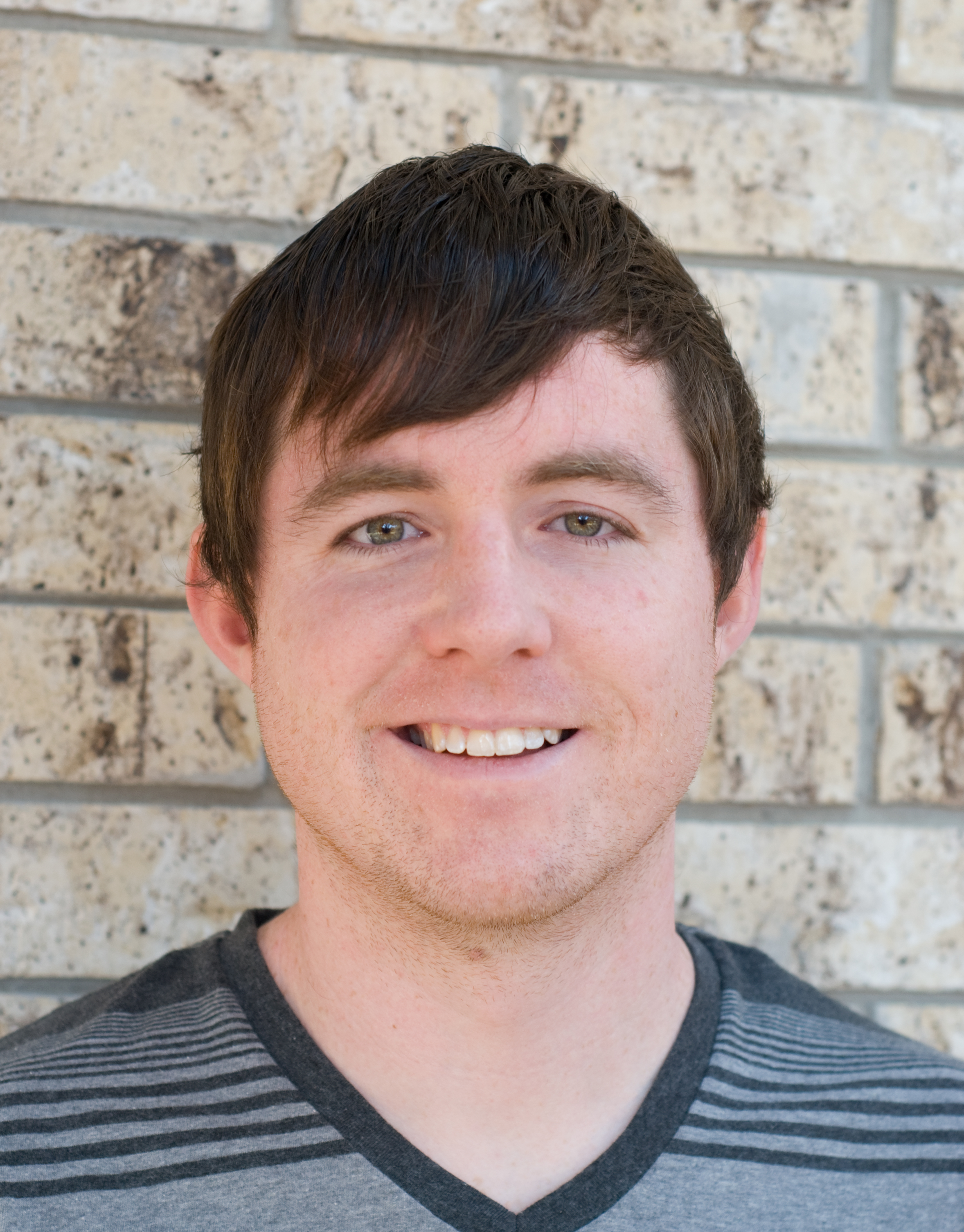
- Saltsman in 2014
- Other name: Adam Atomic
- Occupation: Indie video game developer
- Years active: 2008- present
- Known for: Canabalt

Adam Saltsman, also known as Adam Atomic, is an American indie video game designer best known for creating the endless runner Canabalt. He is a founder of Semi Secret Software and Finji video game studios.

== Career ==
=== Flixel (2008-11) ===
Saltsman produced an open-source game development library for Adobe Flash called Flixel. Saltsman discussed the use of Flixel as a medium for new developers, and used it to develop Canabalt. The video game development tool Stencyl makes use of the Flixel framework.

=== Gravity Hook (2008) ===
Saltsman developed the browser game Gravity Hook in August 2008, which is a vertically scrolling video game in which the player attempts to use a futuristic grappling hook to climb out of an underground, secret base in order to reach the surface. The game was remade into Gravity Hook HD for browser and iOS in 2010.

=== Canabalt (2009) ===
almost no one in the industry ... hasn't taken serious note of its acclaim and wondered what magic formula there might be hidden in its design that can be replicated elsewhere.

— Brandon Boyer on Canabalt in Boing Boing, November 11, 2009

Saltsman developed the endless runner Canabalt in 2009, where an anonymous runner moves in one direction and is able to jump and slide upon landing. Boing Boing described the game as a "one-button action-opus". It was made in response to Experimental Gameplay's "Bare Minimum" challenge. The game's viral success was a surprise to him, and he later felt like he squandered the opportunity and audience. When asked in an interview where he imagined the running man coming from, Saltsman stated "I used to have fantasies at my old office job of running down our long, long hallway just for fun. And to literally escape. I'd forgotten about that until months after Canabalt came out. There used to be an intro cinematic that I was designing, where the character receives an email, but it was all getting in the way of the main thing". Saltsman presented the game design concept of "Time Until Death" at the 2011 IndieCade.

=== Hundreds (2013) ===
Saltsman began to collaborate with Greg Wohlwend on Hundreds. The game was Wohlwend's first as game designer, and he open sourced the game after online game sites showed no interest in purchasing it. Semi Secret's Eric Johnson found the code and made an iPad port in a weekend, beginning the collaboration. Semi Secret did not have the funds to begin a new game from scratch, so the project fit their company roadmap. Saltsman did not expect to work on the game himself, but became the primary puzzle designer.

Hundreds was released on January 7, 2013 for iPhone and iPad, and on June 28 for Android to what video game review score aggregator Metacritic called "generally favorable" reviews. It was an honorable mention in Best Mobile Game and Nuovo Award categories of the 2012 Game Developers Conference Independent Games Festival, and an honorable mention in Excellence in Visual Art at the 2013 festival. Hundreds was also an official selection at IndieCade 2012. In January 2013, Saltsman was working on an Android release of the game.

=== Alphabet (2013) ===
Saltsman collaborated with Keita Takahashi on the title Alphabet (stylized A͈L͈P͈H͈A͈B͈E͈T͈) which was developed for the launch of LA Game Space in 2012. The experimental game was first displayed to the public by Juegos Rancheros on April 5, 2013 and was released to backers of the LA/GS Kickstarter that September. Since 2018 the title has been available for free from The Internet Archive.

=== Finji ===
In March 2014, Saltsman re-announced Finji, a game studio based in Grand Rapids, Michigan that had existed since 2006 but was relaunched. Saltsman directs the studio, and his wife, Rebekah, produces and does game design. The company develops games internally and produces others. They announced four titles with the relaunch. The first, Portico, is in collaboration with Alec Holowka of Aquaria and was renamed from Grave. It is a 2D turn-based tactical survival game first announced in mid-2011. Players use traps to stop incoming monsters from entering a sacred gate. Finji distributed Night in the Woods, a Kickstarter-funded project by Scott Benson and Holowka. They also sell Saltsman's survival game Capsule (in collaboration with Robin Arnott). They also announced Overland, a "turn-based tactical survival game" in development with Shay Pierce of Deep Plaid Games, which Saltsman privately displayed during the 2014 Game Developers Conference.

Finji has also published Tunic, developed by Andrew Shouldice and Chicory: A Colorful Tale. In June 2014, Polytron announced that it would be co-publishing the "interactive musical landscape anthology" game Panoramical with Finji. The company does not have plans to crowdfund future games. According to a 2024 The Blade article Finji generally takes a 20 percent return on each game it produces which is 10% lower than the industry average.

In 2023 Finji along with a few other indie game studios were involved in an amicus brief in support of the proposed acquisition of Activision Blizzard by Microsoft amid an appeal of a lawsuit filed by the FTC attempting to prevent the acquisition.

Finji's next title, Usual June, was announced at The Game Awards in December 2023. The game is scheduled for release in 2027, and is being released in collaboration with SweetBaby Inc..

In 2025 the company began hosting one-on-one mentorship sessions at a coffeeshop in Grand Rapids, Michigan.

In February 2026 the company accused TikTok of using Generative AI to produce unauthorized "racist and sexist" ads of its games.

==== Games published ====
The following is a table of games published by Finji.

Year	Title	Developer	Platforms	Notes
2014	Capsule	Adam Saltsman, Robin Arnott	Mac, Windows	
2014	Longest Night	Infinite Fall	Linux, Macintosh, Windows	Night in the Woods supplemental game #1
2015	Feist	Bits & Beasts	Android, iPad, iPhone, Linux, Macintosh, PlayStation 4, Tomahawk F1, Windows, Xbox One	
2015	Panoramical	Fernando Ramallo, David Kanaga	Macintosh, Windows	
2015	Lost Constellation	Infinite Fall	Linux, Macintosh, Windows	Night in the Woods supplemental game #2
2016	Journey of 1000 Stars	Farbs	Android, iPhone, iPad	
2016	Runaway Toad	Shini Co.	Android, iPad	
2017	Night in the Woods	Infinite Fall	iPad, iPhone, Linux, Macintosh, Nintendo Switch, PlayStation 4, Windows, Xbox One	
2019	Overland	Finji	iPad, iPhone, Linux, Macintosh, Nintendo Switch, PlayStation 4, tvOS, Windows, Xbox One	
2019	Wilmot's Warehouse	Hollow Ponds, Richard Hogg	iPad, iPhone, Macintosh, Nintendo Switch, PlayStation 4, Windows, Windows Apps, Xbox One, Xbox Series X/S	
2021	Chicory: A Colorful Tale	Greg Lobanov	Macintosh, Nintendo Switch, PlayStation 4, PlayStation 5, Windows	
2022	Tunic	Andrew Shouldice	Mac, Windows, Xbox One, Xbox Series X/S, Nintendo Switch, PlayStation 4, PlayStation 5	
2022	I Was a Teenage Exocolonist	Northway Games	Mac, Windows, Linux, Nintendo Switch, PS5	
2024	Wilmot Works It Out	Hollow Ponds, Richard Hogg	Macintosh, Windows	
2025	Usual June	Finji	Windows	

===== Cancelled =====
Title	Developer	Platforms	Notes
Portico	Adam Saltsman, Alec Holowka		Previously announced under the title Grave, cancelled in 2016
Revenant Hill	The Glory Society	Linux, Macintosh, Windows, PS4, PS5	Cancelled in 2023
