= Unknown 9: Awakening =

- Developer: Reflector Entertainment
- Publisher: Bandai Namco Entertainment
- Director: Christophe Rossignol
- Producer: Miguel Aguilera
- Designer: Pierre-Luc Jutras Gouin
- Programmers: Jonathan Gauvin; Frédéric Robichaud
- Artists: Cyril Sinel; Patrick Limoges
- Writer: Kevin Shortt
- Composer: Yuichiro Oku
- Engine: Unreal Engine 4
- Platforms: Windows; PlayStation 4; PlayStation 5; Xbox One; Xbox Series X/S
- Release: October 18, 2024
- Genre: Action-adventure
- Modes: Single-player, multiplayer

Unknown 9: Awakening is a 2024 action-adventure game developed by Canadian studio Reflector Entertainment and published by Bandai Namco Entertainment. Set in India in the early 20th century, the game focuses on a woman with magical powers fighting against a mysterious organization that killed her mentor. British actress Anya Chalotra portrays the main character through both body-scanning and motion capture. It was designed to be part of a multimedia franchise with the Unknown 9 series being referred to as a transmedia series.

Unknown 9: Awakening was released for PlayStation 4, PlayStation 5, Windows, Xbox One, and Xbox Series X/S on October 18, 2024. The game received mixed reviews from critics, and due to low sales, the planned sequels were cancelled.

== Gameplay ==
Unknown 9: Awakening is a third-person action-adventure video game. The player is allowed to partake in combat or to avoid enemies using stealth. A key feature of the game is the ability to body-swap by tapping into the main characters supernatural powers which allows for alternative means of traversing a level. She has a variety of psychic powers as well, referred to as Umbric Ability, which include invisibility, or possession. Through clairvoyance, she can see enemies through obstacles and see where they are on the map.

== Story ==
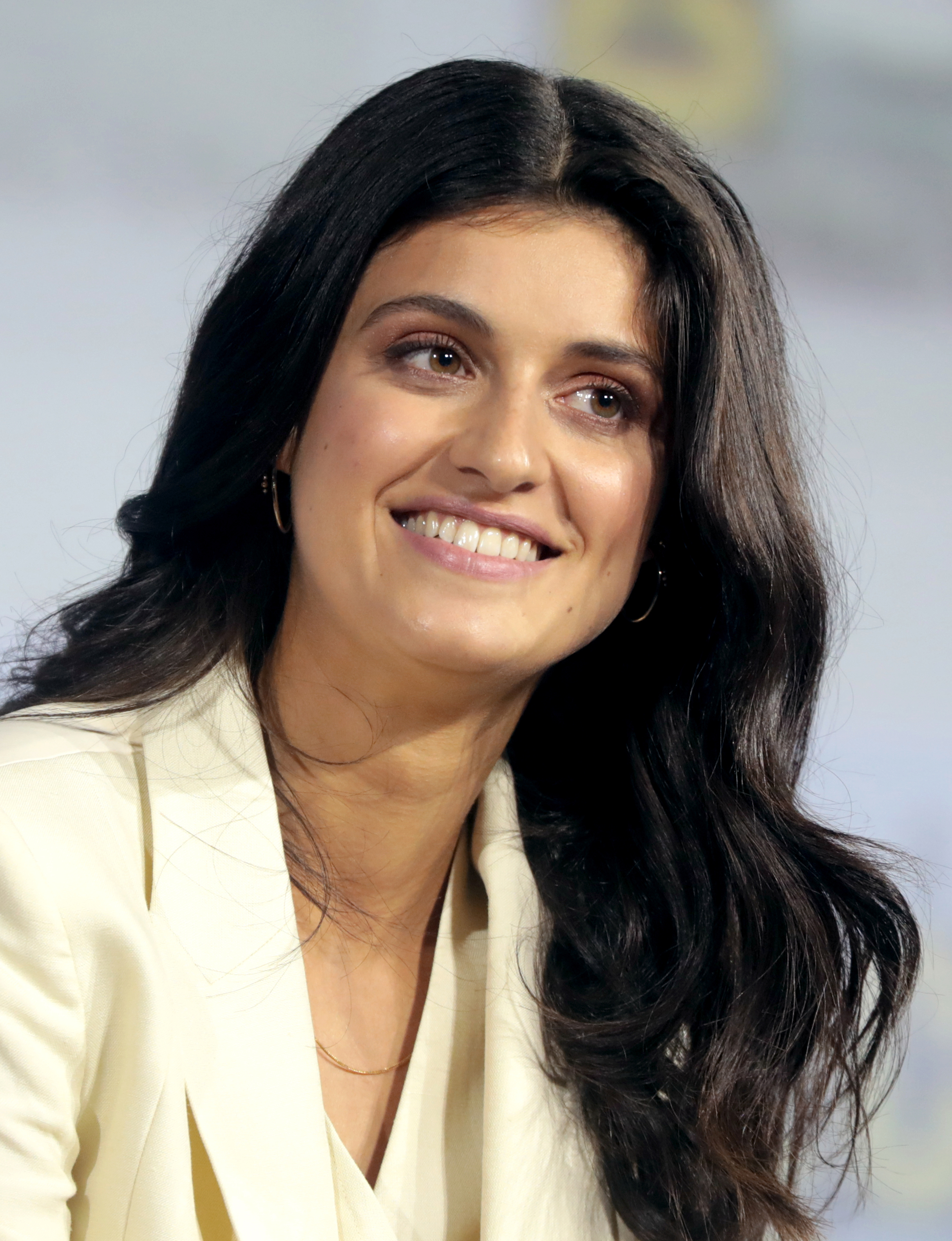
Anya Chalotra portrayed the main character

The game's backstory explains that human civilizations have risen and been destroyed in a series of endless and inevitable Cycles. Nine members of one ancient and advanced civilization, the Sahin, obtained immortality in order to survive the end of their Cycle in the hopes of finding a way to put a stop to the Cycles. These surviving Sahin influence humanity from the shadows as the Unknown 9.

Set in Northern India during the early 20th century, the game follows Haroona, a Quaestor, a person with mystical abilities able to perceive and manipulate an alternate dimension known as the Fold. The plot begins in 1908, with Haroona and her Quaestor mentor Reika traveling to the desert to confront Vincent, a former Quaestor pupil of Reika's. Vincent and his followers are the Ascendants, a radical splinter group of a secret society of Quaestors and explorers called the Leap Year Society. Vincent defeats Reika using technology that disables her powers, forcing Haroona to flee.

Four years later, in 1912, Haroona is seeking revenge on Vincent for killing Reika. While hunting Vincent, she meets up with an old cowboy, Luther, and an African engineer, Buchra, who are part of a group of surviving members of the Leap Year Society. Haroona and her allies steal Vincent's airship, the Morning Star, making it their new home base. Haroona also learns from Luther that Reika is alive and that Vincent's plan is to release a dangerous and powerful Fold entity, Seshin, in hopes of using its power to prevent the upcoming end of the current Cycle. While attempting to find and rescue Reika, Haroona learns that Reika is one of the Unknown 9 and has been convinced to ally with Vincent due to her immortality expiring and not wanting to die before fulfilling the Nine's mission of breaking the Cycles.

Haroona, Luther, and Buchra travel to the gateway to Seshin's prison, where Luther is fatally wounded by Mila, Luther's former pupil and Vincent's second-in-command. Haroona confronts Vincent in the Deep Fold and severs his connection to his physical body, condemning him to wander the Fold for eternity. However, Seshin is freed and manifests in Haroona's body, allowing her to destroy the remaining army of Ascendants. Reika absorbs Seshin into herself to atone for her actions, telling Haroona and Buchra to seal her inside one of the Ascendants' containment devices. She instructs Haroona to travel to a remote jungle location, where Haroona uses Sahin technology to become Reika's replacement as one of the Unknown 9.

== Development ==
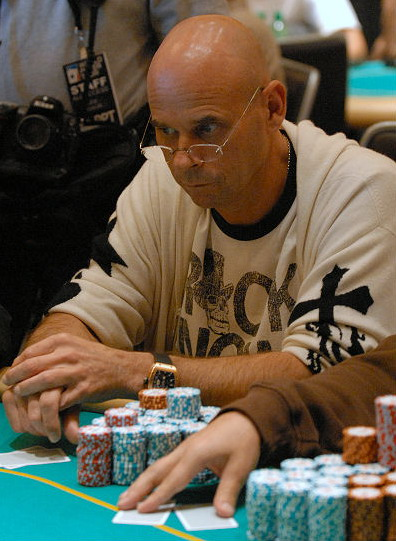
Guy Laliberté in 2007.

Reflector Entertainment was founded by Canadian businessman and Cirque du Soleil founder Guy Laliberté and Alexandre Amancio in 2017. The company was a division of Lune Rouge, which was owned by Laliberté, who owns a majority share of the company, with Amancio owning a minority share. Amancio is a video game developer who had previously worked as creative director for Assassin's Creed Unity. After its founding, the company sought to hire 150 employees to begin development. Preliminary plans for the Unknown 9 series, including the earliest announcement of a video game, were first revealed in October 2018 at the New York Comic Con.

The series was described at that time as utilizing a transmedia form of storytelling which uses a multimedia approach to tell its overall story, spanning video games, a scripted podcast, comic books, and other forms of entertainment. Consultants Kim Belair and David Bédard, who would later form the narrative and development studio Sweet Baby, worked on the series as well. From 2018, Bédard was the brand content manager and Belair the story architect on the Unknown 9 series, encompassing comics, novels, and video games. They initially worked as employees of developer Reflector Entertainment and later as part of Sweet Baby.

The Unknown 9 series was later submitted as a nomination for the Best Use of Storytelling in Social Media award at the 11th Shorty Awards in 2019, but was not chosen as a finalist. Additionally, Reflector Entertainment opened their studio in Maison Alcan in 2020, a building that Laliberté purchased for 50 million dollars. In a 2020 profile for the Montreal Gazette, Amancio said: “Reflector is Guy essentially betting on a local creative guy from Montreal and saying, ‘You know what? I’d like to support the next generation of creative companies’, because he wished someone would’ve helped him when he was trying to (found) the Cirque.”

In 2020, Reflector Entertainment had 100 employees.

The first planned console game, Unknown 9: Awakening, was formally announced at the 2020 Gamescom trade fair. Developers say they were inspired by other media, such as Indiana Jones, The X-Files, and The Matrix. The following month, Bandai Namco Entertainment Europe announced it had purchased Reflector Entertainment. Bandai-Namco's plan at the time was to have half of their content produced outside of Japan.

The game was delayed in part because of COVID-19 and a "talent war in Montreal", according to the developers.

British actress Anya Chalotra plays the main character Haroona including doing motion capture for the character. Chalotra says the motion-capture work for the game was similar to previous work, after some adjustments. "We had a director who was directing us like any other scene. And we do take after take after take to try and get the best one. So it wasn't as different as I thought it might be."

Reflector and Bandai had planned for sequels, with an additional five games planned out with the combined storyline over the franchise taking a century.

== Reception ==
Reception

Aggregate scores
Aggregator	Score
Metacritic	(PC) 54/100 (PS5) 59/100 (XSXS) 64/100
OpenCritic	15% recommend

Review scores
Publication	Score
Edge	4/10
Eurogamer	3/5
GamesRadar+	2.5/5 stars
IGN	5/10

Unknown 9: Awakening received "mixed or average" reviews from critics, according to review aggregator website Metacritic. Fellow review aggregator OpenCritic assessed that the game received weak approval, being recommended by 15% of critics.

IGN said "a few good ideas and can’t save this bland and janky adventure". Eurogamer Portugal reviewed the game, and noted that the game seemed to be ignored on release while lamenting that the setting had potential. IGN Deutschland said the game was middling adventure, neither good nor bad. Several reviewers made reference to the low budget nature of the game. Eurogamer Poland said the game's low budget was obvious from the lack of polish in the final game and that it was too much for the developers to handle. IGN Benelux compared it to a bargain bin game from back in the day.

Some reviews were more positive. IGN Italia praised the game's story driven narrative and adventure elements, saying that the problems stemmed from technical issues. GamesRadar+ praised the story but said that gameplay was lacking. Hobby Consolas gave the game a more positive review.

Edge gave it a poor review, saying "You could also call it derivative and crudely executed, and no transmedia offering can compensate for that."

== Release and legacy ==
Unknown 9: Awakening was released for Windows, PlayStation 4, PlayStation 5, Xbox One, and Xbox Series X/S on October 18, 2024. On Steam, the game reached a peak player count of 285 players by a month of the game's release. Additionally, fewer than 100 people had left a review for the game on the platform. A month after the release of the game, 18% of the workforce at Reflector Entertainment was laid off, though sales and reception of the game were denied to be a reason.

In January 2025, Bandai-Namco Europe CCO Herve Hoerdt released a statement on the reception of the game saying that there will be no sequels for the game. The statement said in part "This decision correlates directly with the failure of the studio's ambitious and courageous first project, a new IP with a rich transmedia universe," and "The performance of the release didn't come near the company expectations, after numerous timeline adjustments and investments, both financially and other, and didn't warrant any further exploration in this universe." Follow-up series and additional staff that worked on the game were laid off. In November 2026, Bandai-Namco announced it is shutting down Reflector Entertainment. Reflector Entertainment posted a message to Linkedin that says "after reviewing the progress of our latest project in pre-production, future development requirements, and current market conditions, Bandai Namco concluded that it could not justify several more years of investment." Bandai Namco projected that shutting down the studio would result in a loss of around €21 million for their Q3 financial results for the fiscal year ending March 31, 2027.

== See also ==
- The Nine Unknown
- The Morning of the Magicians
