= Wilmot's Warehouse =

2019 video game

- Developer: Hollow Ponds
- Publisher: Finji
- Designers: Richard Hogg; Ricky Haggett
- Programmer: Ricky Haggett
- Artist: Richard Hogg
- Composer: Eli Rainsberry
- Engine: OpenFL
- Platforms: macOS, Nintendo Switch, Windows, Xbox One, PlayStation 4
- Release: August 29, 2019
- Genre: Puzzle
- Modes: Single-player, multiplayer

Wilmot's Warehouse is a puzzle video game about storing and retrieving objects. It was developed by Richard Hogg and Ricky Haggett and published by Finji. It was released on August 29, 2019, for macOS, Nintendo Switch, and Windows platforms. The game was a finalist for "Excellence in Design" at the 2018 Independent Games Festival Awards.

A sequel, titled Wilmot Works It Out, was released on October 23, 2024, for Windows and macOS.

== Gameplay ==
The player controls Wilmot, a worker in a two-dimensional warehouse. Each level begins with a delivery of item boxes that the player must store for later retrieval. The organizational strategy is left entirely to the player. (This can be ambiguous, for example, in the tutorial, the player is asked to sort boxes into "winter" and "hats" but is presented with a box that appears to be a woolen hat.) When the delivery timer expires, customers at a service hatch request specific boxes for the player to retrieve and deliver. Proportionate to the delivery's speed, the player receives Progress Stars that can be redeemed for upgrades such as a "dash" ability, the ability to carry more boxes at once, expanded warehouse space, and a timelapse view of the player's progress. The variety and quantity of boxes increases with the game's duration—into the hundreds—constricting the player's navigation of the warehouse aisles. After several rounds (months) of deliveries, the player receives an unlimited period to reorganize the warehouse.

The game's optional Expert Mode adds challenging modifier rules to the gameplay and two players can play at once in the game's split-screen, co-operative mode.

== Development ==
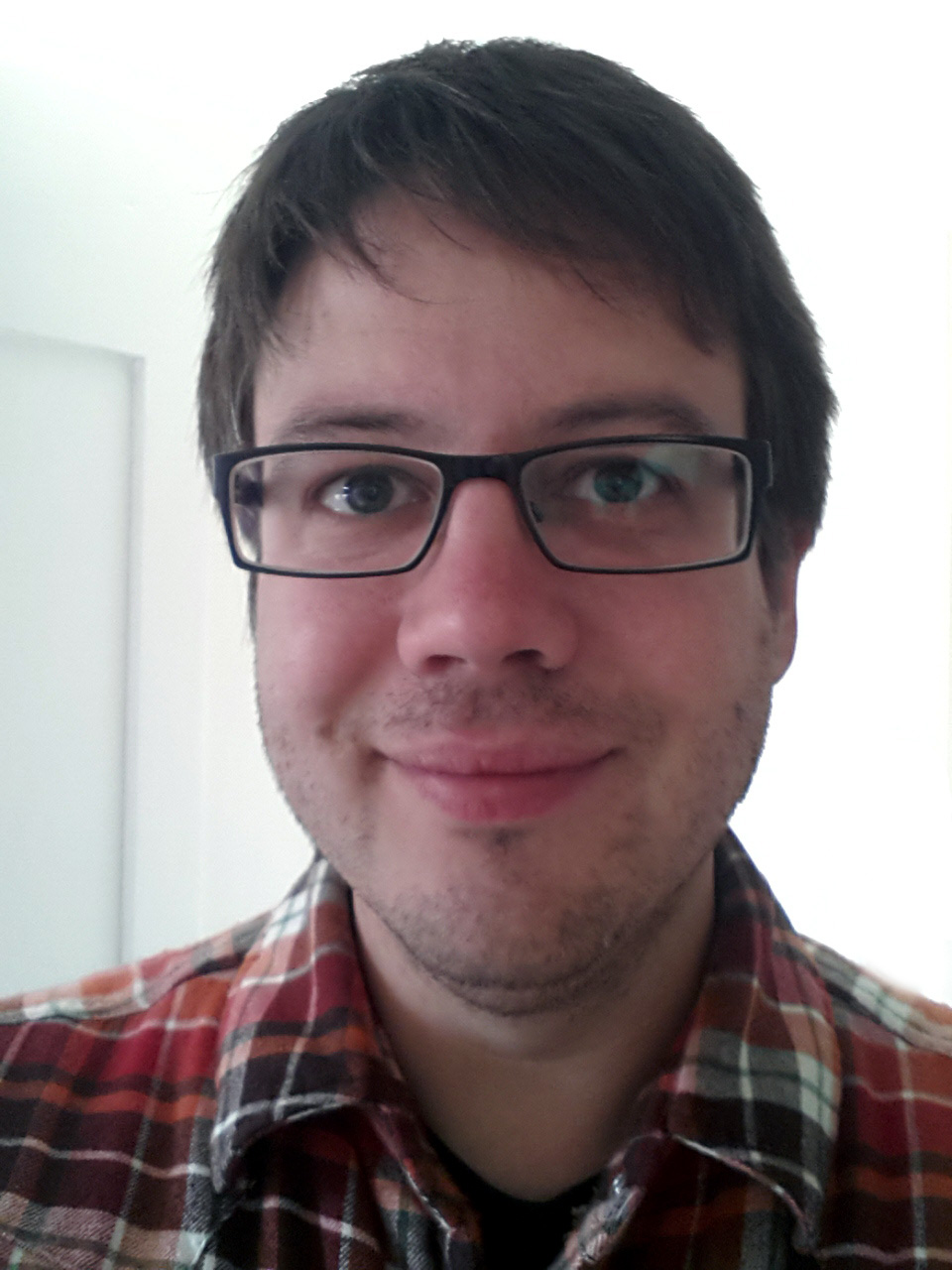
Wilmot's Warehouse developer Ricky Haggett

The game's designers, Richard Hogg and Ricky Haggett, had known each other for a decade before the release of Wilmot's Warehouse. They previously collaborated on projects including Hohokum, wherein they would design together and split the duties of art (Hogg) and coding (Haggett). Hogg, who had worked in a warehouse and picture archive when he was younger, was interested in the therapeutic act of organizing for pleasure. Hogg's original pitch for the game became a running joke—Haggett said it would only work if all the items were for clowns and the game was named "Clown Warehouse". Haggett later made a prototype based on Hogg's tile art, which became the full game.

The game's design challenges were derived from simulating those of real warehouses. The game's items have clear themes but some were made to be more memorable, to overlap in category, or to defy categorization. This deliberate ambiguity was meant to mimic the complexity of a real warehouse.

An early version of the game was released as a Humble Original in 2017. It spent six months in development and was built in the OpenFL framework and Haxe programming language with a soundtrack and sound effects composed by Eli Rainsberry. This version had 500 different item types. Programmer Ruari O'Sullivan supported the final release.

== Reception ==
Reception

Aggregate score
Aggregator	Score
Metacritic	NS: 85/100

Review score
Publication	Score
Nintendo World Report	8.5/10

Reviewers praised the game's balance and pleasantness. Even amid its time-restricted segments, the game's pace is peaceful. Paste praised this contrast: the game's soothing repetition of tidying clutter and calm soundtrack against its more frenetic time-based challenges. Nintendo World Report praised the solo game mode's ability to make drudgery interesting, but thought that the Expert Mode's challenging modifiers removed the relaxed atmosphere that made the game successful. Paste enjoyed the game's smart visual communication and its challenge of finding an efficient organizational system.

Wilmot's Warehouse was a finalist for "Excellence in Design" at the 2018 Independent Games Festival Awards.

== Board game adaptation ==
In 2022, board game publisher CMYK announced a board game adaptation of Wilmot's Warehouse. Some of the original developers of Wilmot's Warehouse were involved in creating the board game. The board game adapted the spirit of the video game by introducing new challenges such as preventing players from speaking, or forcing them to swap seats with each other.
