= Feist (video game) =

2015 action video game

- Developers: Bits & Beasts
- Publisher: Finji Games
- Engine: Unity
- Platforms: Linux, OS X, Windows, PlayStation 4, Xbox One, iOS, Android
- Release: Linux, OS X, Windows; July 2015; PlayStation 4, Xbox One; December 13, 2016
- Genre: Action
- Mode: Single-player

Feist is an action video game for PlayStation 4, Linux, OS X, Windows, and Xbox One. It launched on PC in July 2015. On December 13, 2016 it was released for PlayStation 4 and Xbox One.

== Development ==
Development on the game started in 2008 and a playable beta version was available for download exclusively on the Mac platform. The game would win the 2008 Unity Awards for Best Overall Game and Best Visual Design. It would finish development in 2015 and be published by Finji Games as a platform game. The developer is Bits & Beasts in Switzerland.

== Plot ==
The game follows a small furry animal, as it attempts to rescue its mate from a pack of predators.

== Reception ==
Reception

Aggregate score
| Aggregator | Score |
|---|---|
| Metacritic | PC: 65/100; PS4: 54/100; XONE: 59/100 |

The review aggregator website Metacritic gave it a score of 65 out of 100.
