= Goodbye Volcano High =

2023 video game

- Promotional cover art
- Developer: KO_OP
- Publisher: KO_OP
- Directors: Kyle McKernan; Saleem Dabbous
- Designers: Kyle McKernan; Samuel Boucher
- Programmers: Hope Erin Phillips; Jacob Blommestein
- Artists: Ellen Alsop; Lucie Viatge
- Writers: Jenna Yow; Kyle McKernan
- Composer: Omar Dabbous
- Engine: Unity
- Platforms: PlayStation 4; PlayStation 5; Windows
- Release: 29 August 2023
- Genre: Narrative adventure
- Mode: Single-player

Goodbye Volcano High is a narrative adventure game by KO_OP. It was announced on 11 June 2020, and was released on 29 August 2023 for the PlayStation 4, PlayStation 5, and Windows.

== Gameplay ==
The player selects dialogue choices and controls rhythm minigames during performances by the band Worm Drama.

== Plot ==
Set in a world of anthropomorphic dinosaurs, the game centers on the members of the band Worm Drama; the non-binary lead vocalist Fang the pterodactyl (Lachlan Watson), guitarist Trish the triceratops (Ozioma Akagha) and drummer Reed the velociraptor (Mark Whitten), alongside the school's student council president Naomi the parasaurolophus (Allegra Clark) and Fang's brother Naser (Abe Bueno-Jallad), - as they venture through the highs and lows of their final year as Volcano High seniors with graduation looming over the horizon while coming to terms with their own impending extinction from an asteroid.

== Development and release ==
The game was initially announced during PlayStation's "Future of Gaming" online presentation on 11 June 2020, with a release window of 2021. In August 2021, KO_OP announced a delay of Goodbye Volcano High's release until sometime in 2022. The developers wanted to avoid crunch related to the COVID-19 pandemic, and had already brought in a new writing team from Sweet Baby Inc. in June 2020 to reboot the game's entire narrative direction. The new narrative direction was largely inspired by the experiences of high school seniors graduating during the pandemic. In November 2022, the game was delayed to 2023. A new gameplay trailer premiered during a PlayStation "State of Play" presentation on 23 February 2023, announcing a release date of 15 June but was delayed to 29 August. Prior to release, demos of the game were showcased at the 2023 Game Developers Conference as part of the "Day of the Devs" selection, PAX East 2023, and at the 2023 Tribeca Festival as part of the "Games & Immersive Experience" selection.

== Reception ==
Reception

Aggregate score
Aggregator	Score
Metacritic	82/100 (PC); 81/100 (PS5)

Review scores
Publication	Score
Eurogamer	5/5
GamesRadar+	4/5
Hardcore Gamer	4/5

Following the revamped game's showing at PAX East 2023, it was positively received by critics. Kyle LeClair of Hardcore Gamer praised the game, saying its rhythm game elements had the "perfect level of challenge", and that its music was "ear-pleasing". He called the character designs "striking", praising Fang as a "terrific and likeable protagonist" with "great voice acting", and predicting it would be a "deep and unique tale". Rachel Watts of Rock Paper Shotgun wrote that she "had a great time with the demo", comparing it to the adventure game Life Is Strange.

In June 2021, anonymous 4chan users under the name Cavemanon created Snoot Game, an "anti-fangame" intended as a rival version of the game, which was described by a KO_OP developer as "not made in good faith" due to Snoot Game's anti-queer messaging.

=== Awards ===
Year	Ceremony	Category	Result	Ref.
2023	Tribeca Festival	Tribeca Games Award	Won	
2023	IndieCade	Grand Jury Award	Won	
2023	IndieCade	Performance Spotlight Award	Won	
2023	IndieCade	Narrative Spotlight Award	Nominated	
2023	The Game Awards 2023	Games for Impact	Nominated	
2024	GLAAD Media Awards	Outstanding Video Game	Nominated	
2024	Independent Games Festival	Seumas McNally Grand Prize	Honorable mention	
2024	Independent Games Festival	Excellence in Narrative	Honorable mention	
2024	Independent Games Festival	Excellence in Visual Arts	Honorable mention	
2024	British Academy Games Awards	Game Beyond Entertainment	Nominated	
2024	World Soundtrack Awards	Game Music Award	Nominated	
