= Gnog =

2017 video game

GNOG
- Developer: KO_OP
- Publisher: Double Fine Presents
- Platforms: PlayStation 4; iOS; Microsoft Windows; macOS
- Release: PlayStation 4; May 2, 2017; iOS; November 28, 2017; Microsoft Windows, macOS; July 17, 2018
- Genre: Puzzle
- Mode: Single-player

Gnog (stylized in all caps) is a 2017 puzzle video game developed by KO_OP and published by Double Fine Presents. It was released for PlayStation 4, iOS, Microsoft Windows, and macOS.

== Development ==
GNOG was developed by Montreal-based studio KO_OP. Originally titled "GNAH", the title was changed due to a trademark dispute. The game was showcased at the 2014 E3 "Horizon conference". It was shown at E3 2015 with a playable demo.

It was released on the PlayStation 4 on May 2, 2017, and on iOS on November 28 the same year. Later, on July 17, 2018, it became available via Steam on Windows and macOS as well.

== Reception ==
Reception

Aggregate score
| Aggregator | Score |
|---|---|
| Metacritic | 82/100 (iPhone/iPad); 77/100 (PS4) |

Review scores
| Publication | Score |
|---|---|
| Destructoid | 8/10 |
| Game Informer | 7.75/10 |
| GameRevolution | 4/5 |
| Pocket Gamer | 4/5 |

GNOG received generally positive reviews from video game critics. During the 21st Annual D.I.C.E. Awards, the Academy of Interactive Arts & Sciences nominated the game for "Family Game of the Year.
