= Mikengreg =

American independent video game company

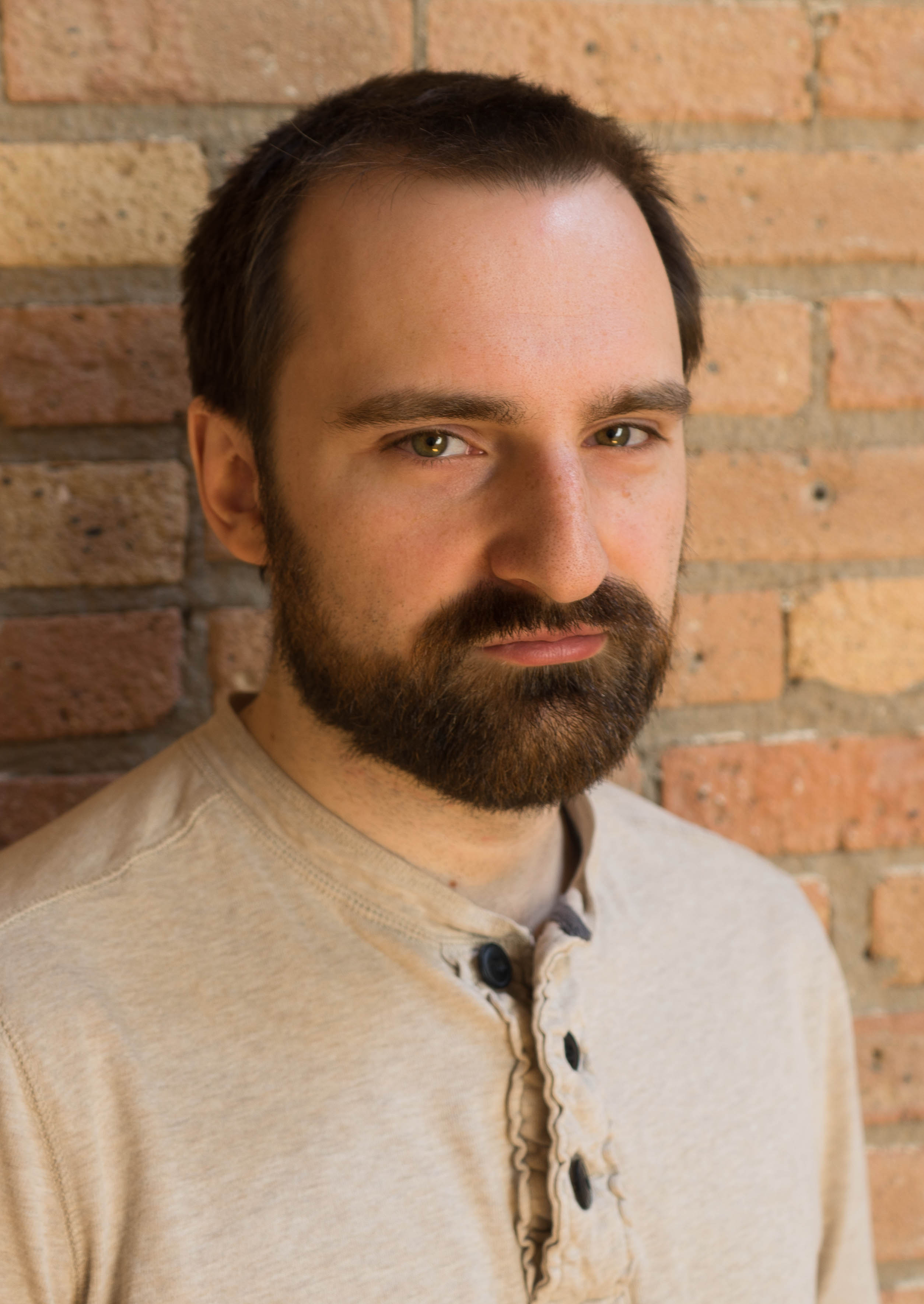
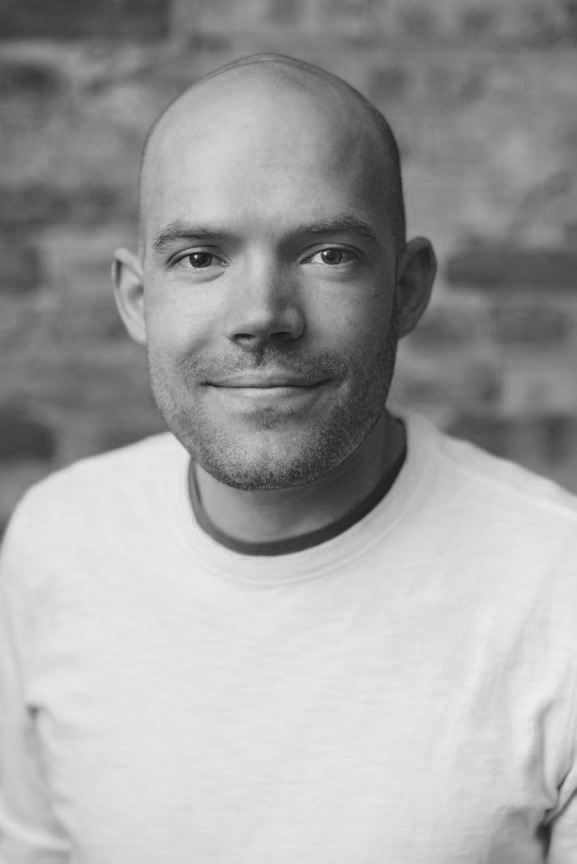
Mike Boxleiter and Greg Wohlwend

Mikengreg is an independent video game development team of Mike Boxleiter and Greg Wohlwend. Their games include Solipskier, Gasketball, and TouchTone. The two met in a game development class at Iowa State University and later began to collaborate on the Adobe Flash game Dinowaurs. When the project was funded, they founded Intuition Games with other college friends in Ames, Iowa, where they worked on small Flash games such as Gray, Liferaft, and Fig. 8 for Flash game sites such as Kongregate. Dinowaurs was one of the first games signed for the Kongregate platform. Their other games involved controlling the weather, influencing individuals in a riot, and riding a bicycle. Boxleiter and Wohlwend worked on several additional games that were put on hiatus.

They later became Mikengreg in 2010 and released Solipskier in August for both Flash and iOS later that year. Its success let them take a more experimental approach towards their next game, the free-to-play Gasketball. Mikengreg ran out of money during the game's development and the two lived on friends' couches. The game was reviewed favorably upon its August 2012 launch, but did not earn near the developers' estimates. Their next game, TouchTone (2015), spent two years in development.

== Intuition Games ==
Boxleiter and Wohlwend met in an experimental video game development class at Iowa State University. Wohlwend had attempted to help Boxleiter with a project, but quit after drawing a few aliens. Boxleiter said he "didn't like [Wohlwend] much after that". They met again as coworkers at the university's Virtual Reality Application Center during Boxleiter's final year of college (Wohlwend's penultimate year). Upon discovering their close interests, they began to work on an Adobe Flash game named Dinowaurs while they completed college. Boxleiter graduated in 2007 with a degree in computer science, and Wohlwend a year later with a degree in graphic design. They concluded that they needed a company to make money while they worked on the game with collaborators, and around May 2007, founded Intuition Games at the university's Research Park. They decided to stay in Ames, Iowa due to its financial feasibility and local connections, but two other members of the team, Josh Larson and Ted Martens, lived in Des Moines and Chicago, respectively. The team met as students at Iowa State through work and game development circles. They saw Flash games as an easy entry point into full-time self-employment, but planned to eventually work on console platforms such as WiiWare. Before Dinowaurs, the team made a game about a destructive porpoise, which was abandoned when Dinowaurs received funding.

In their development process, Boxleiter and Wohlwend both proposed and worked on each other's ideas, and would drop the ideas they found unexciting. The two also built games from keywords and brainstorming, and would flesh out the game mechanics through "heated" argument. Their labor as a team was divided in that Wohlwend always did the art and Boxleiter the programming, as reflective of their skills at the time. The pair agreed to an assessment of their partnership as "left-brain right-brain", and agreed that "editing"—the process of iterating through revisions—was central to their joint work. As they worked, they always retained their prototypes. They both appreciated the "creative freedom" of being self-employed, though they struggled with the business aspects, relative workplace "isolation", low salaries, and lack of job stability. Both were motivated to do their own work instead of contracted tasks. They thought of themselves as artists and of their work as experimental. Boxleiter and Wohlwend worked long hours when making the Flash games, which they found exciting and unsustainable. At Intuition, they worked on games such as Dinowaurs, Gray, Fig. 8, and Liferaft and participated in at least six game jams. As of April 2010, they had created 10 games together.

=== Dinowaurs ===
Intuition's first game, Dinowaurs, is a strategy and action game where two players compete as dinosaurs to seize the most cavemen settlements on a single screen. Captured settlements provide resources for upgrades to the players' dinosaurs. The object of this arms race is to kill the other dinosaur. It features online matchmaking. The game was built from an unfinished Flash-based multiplayer strategy game started by Boxleiter and an image of a stegosaurus with a jetpack drawn by Martens. (Note: Boxleiter's concept had been influenced by computer strategy games such as Master of Orion, Master of Magic, and Civilization and Boxleiter's interest in multiplayer games.) The team combined the concepts for a strategy game about dinosaurs fighting for food. They struggled with long-distance communication, but used a project management website and Skype to stay in touch. When looking for a platform, Intuition originally pitched the game with a clay dinosaur to Adult Swim—who was funding Flash games—but was declined for not being "edgy enough". In June, they then tried then-new Flash site Kongregate via a connection Larson had made with its CEO Jim Greer at the 2007 Game Developers Conference. He asked the team to wait for their new Director of Games to be hired, who ended up being Intuition's contact at Adult Swim. The contact had liked the idea and thought the game worked better for Kongregate than did for Adult Swim, and so funded the game by November 2007 as one of the first five for the Kongregate platform. The package was a one-year browser exclusivity agreement that let Intuition keep the intellectual property.

Dinowaurs was finished in two years for a 2009 release. Their later games would only take a few months apiece in comparison. They abandoned the use of design documents after Dinowaurs, and instead chose to refine and experiment in process. IndieGames.com reported mixed reviews from players and recommended the game as "good solid fun" for newcomers and veterans. The Escapist described the game as similar to Scorched Earth and "surprisingly complex" with its need for three tutorials. He complimented its "faux-retro" soundtrack and aesthetics, which he felt outweighed the learning curve's difficulty.

=== Other games ===
Intuition released Effing Hail and Gray around April 2009. Players in action game Effing Hail control hail and wind to destroy the most buildings and midair objects within a time limit. The hail grows in size when the wind is used to suspend it in air. The game was published through Kongregate. As an example of their more experimental games, Intuition built Gray—a game about "political consciousness"—as a result of their frustrations during the 2008 U.S. presidential election. Players control a single character and try to end a riot by influencing other individuals in the crowd. The game was featured at IndieCade in 2009.

Fig. 8. is based on one of Wohlwend's college art projects. (Note: In the project, Wohlwend followed a bike trail in the snow, metaphorically related it to the tribulations of romantic relationship, and made an art installation involving a bike spray-painted black with two errant red and blue tracks painted on the floor.) It went unused on their whiteboard for four months until they needed an idea, whereupon Boxleiter added game mechanics to the visuals. It took about ten hours to prototype the controls, and they tested a ten-wheel bike before deciding on two. The scrolling camera was inspired by a game Boxleiter had been playing called String Theory, and they added the soundtrack last. Fig. 8 was funded by a sponsor. Boxleiter considers Gray and Fig. 8 to be "small games". As projects, he considered them "more like vacations ... than actual work".

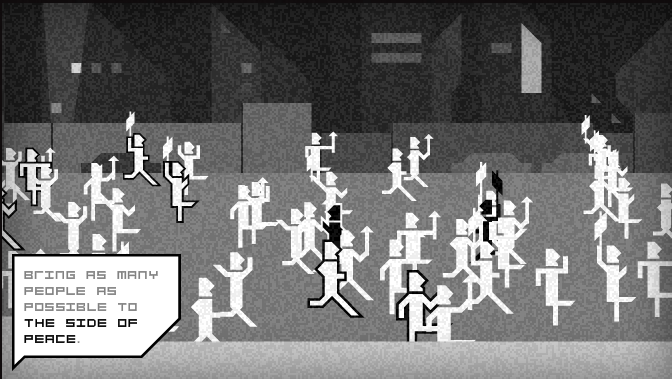
Gray

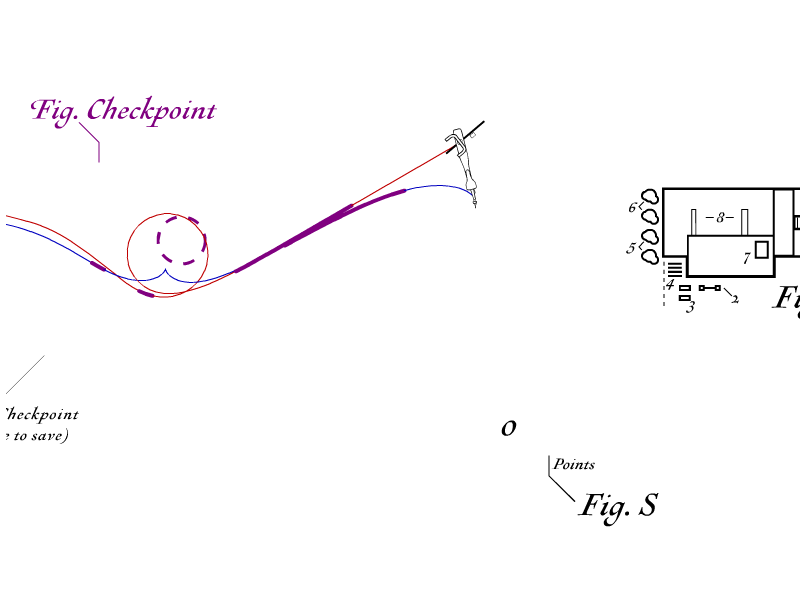
Fig. 8

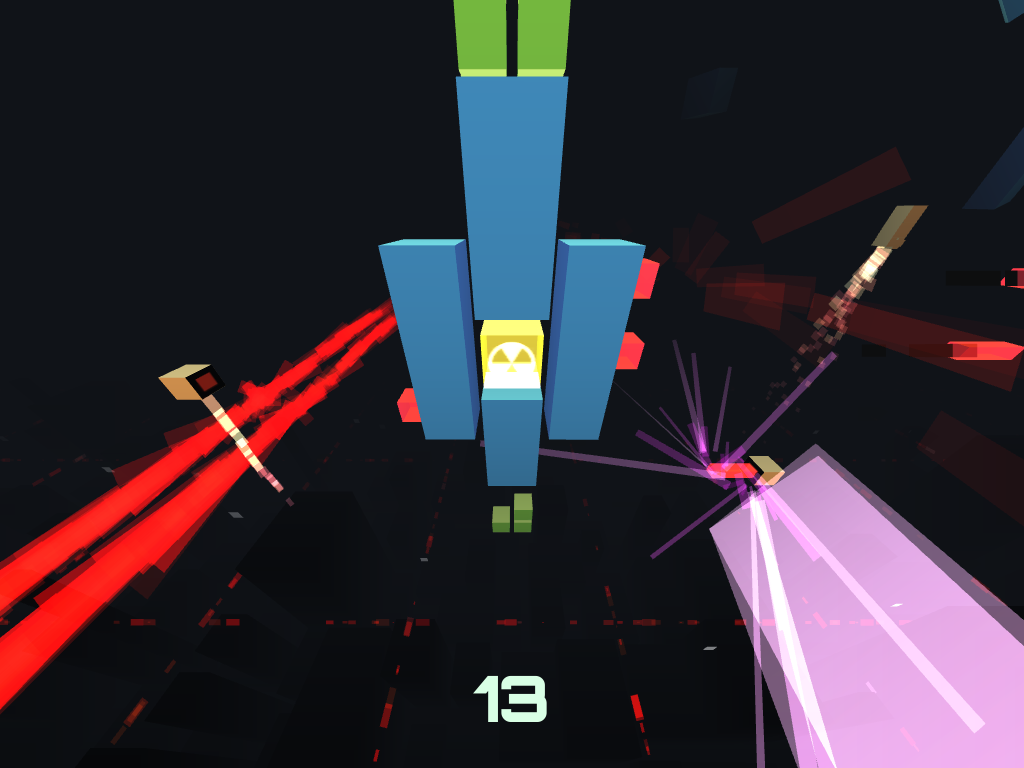
4Fourths

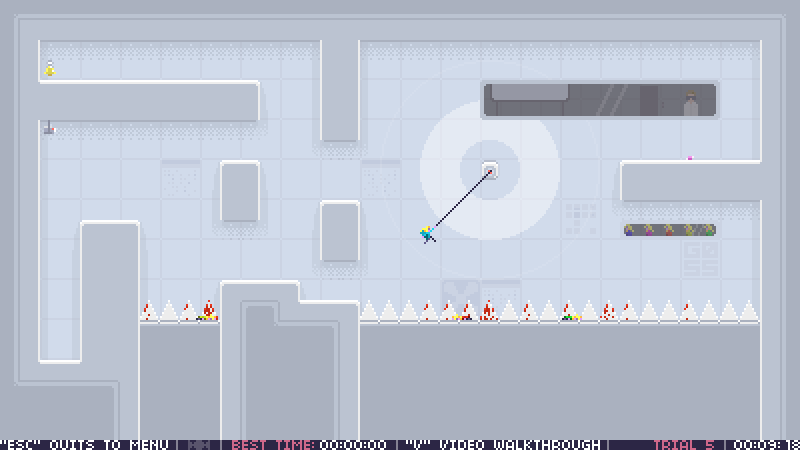
Liferaft: Zero

From left, clockwise: Screenshots of
Gray, Fig. 8, Liferaft: Zero, and 4Fourths.

Intuition attempted to fund their next game, Liferaft, via crowdfunding site Kickstarter. The game is set in a single day within an "abandoned testing facility ... in a post-apocalyptic sci-fi" world. The player-character is a young woman named Goss who had been surviving off of lichen until a giant squid crashes into the room and allows her escape. Liferaft was built for release in three episodes: her escape, "revelation", and "resolution". The core gameplay revolves around a "Bionic Commando-style grappling hook". Intuition released a two-level Flash demo where the game had 16-bit era graphics and music composed by Danny Baranowsky of Canabalt and Fathom. They expected development to take six months between November 2009 and February 2010. They canceled the Kickstarter and put the project on hiatus in October 2009 for two small Flash games and an intern's Unity project.

In March 2010 and under the moniker Mikengreg, Boxleiter and Wohlwend's 4fourths was chosen among six games out of more than 150 submissions for inclusion in Kokoromi's Gamma IV showcase. Submissions were based on the theme of "one button games". The four-player game is played with two teams each controlling spaceships on each side of the screen. One player on each team controls the ship's vertical height and the other fires the guns, which aim towards the center of the screen. Since every player only has one button, the vertical height controls boost the ship vertically when the button is pressed and leaves the ship to slowly descend when unpressed. The teams work together to shoot at and destroy enemy boss ships that travel through the center of the screen. Teams can also shoot each other's ships as friendly fire is activated. The game was displayed at Gamma IV in San Francisco and at the 2010 Game Developers Conference. 4fourths was Michael Rose of IndieGame.com's favorite game of the Gamma IV selections. It was later chosen for Brandon Boyer's Wild Rumpus London event in September 2011.

Mikengreg announced Liferaft: Zero and Solipskier in November 2010. The former is a "prequel teaser" to the Flash platform game Liferaft that they had announced the previous year, a game of trial-based challenges with wall-jumping and grappling wherein girl clones attempt to swing and jump around test chambers to reach and ring a bell. Wohlwend and Boxleiter made the shorter version to limit the scope creep of the overall project. IndieGames.com named the Flash game their third best browser platformer of the year. Their other game, 4fourths, was put on hiatus for lack of resources. They were interested in making games outside the Flash market.

== Solipskier ==
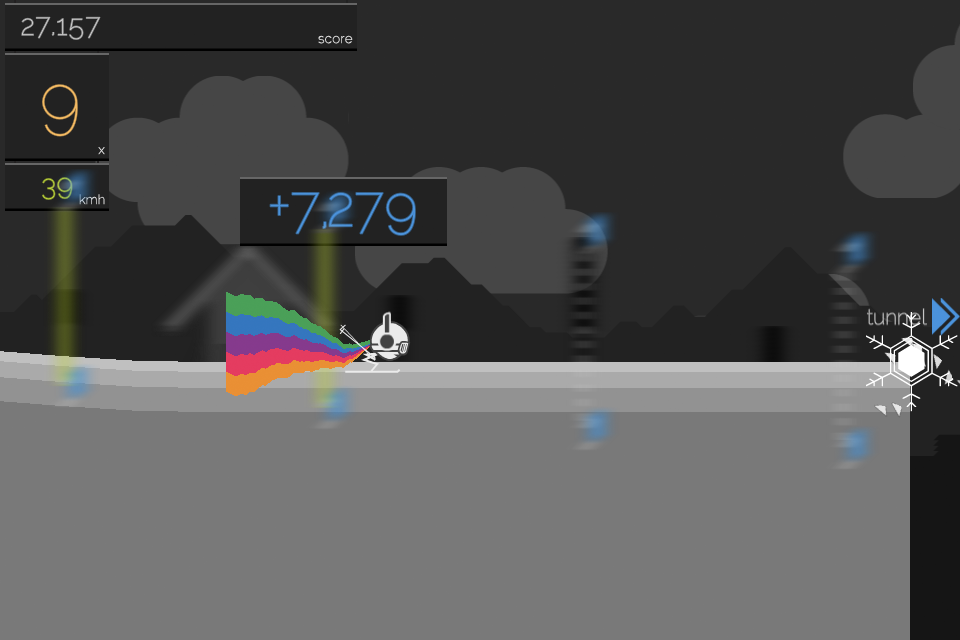
Solipskier gameplay

Their first game as Mikengreg was Solipskier, where the player's finger draws the ground for the on-screen skier to pass through a level filled with gates, tunnels, and walls. It was designed as a Flash game, which set the limitations for its mechanics. The game concept came from a brainstorming session about parallax scrolling, and was revised in fits of creativity. They paired the parallax scrolling with speed and began to prototype. Boxleiter first understood its potential when publishers fought for the bid to the game. They then decided to develop for iOS in addition to Flash, and to release both versions simultaneously. It was released on August 29, 2010 and became their first game to receive public appreciation. Solipskier for iOS made around $70,000 in its first two months (as compared to $15,000 from the Flash release), which gave them enough stability to branch out into non-Flash platforms.

Boxleiter spoke at the 2012 Game Developers Conference Indie Soapbox on how indie stars were made from hard work and not from the Independent Games Festival. He added that winning an award at the festival for Solipskier was an insignificant aspect of his career.

== Gasketball ==
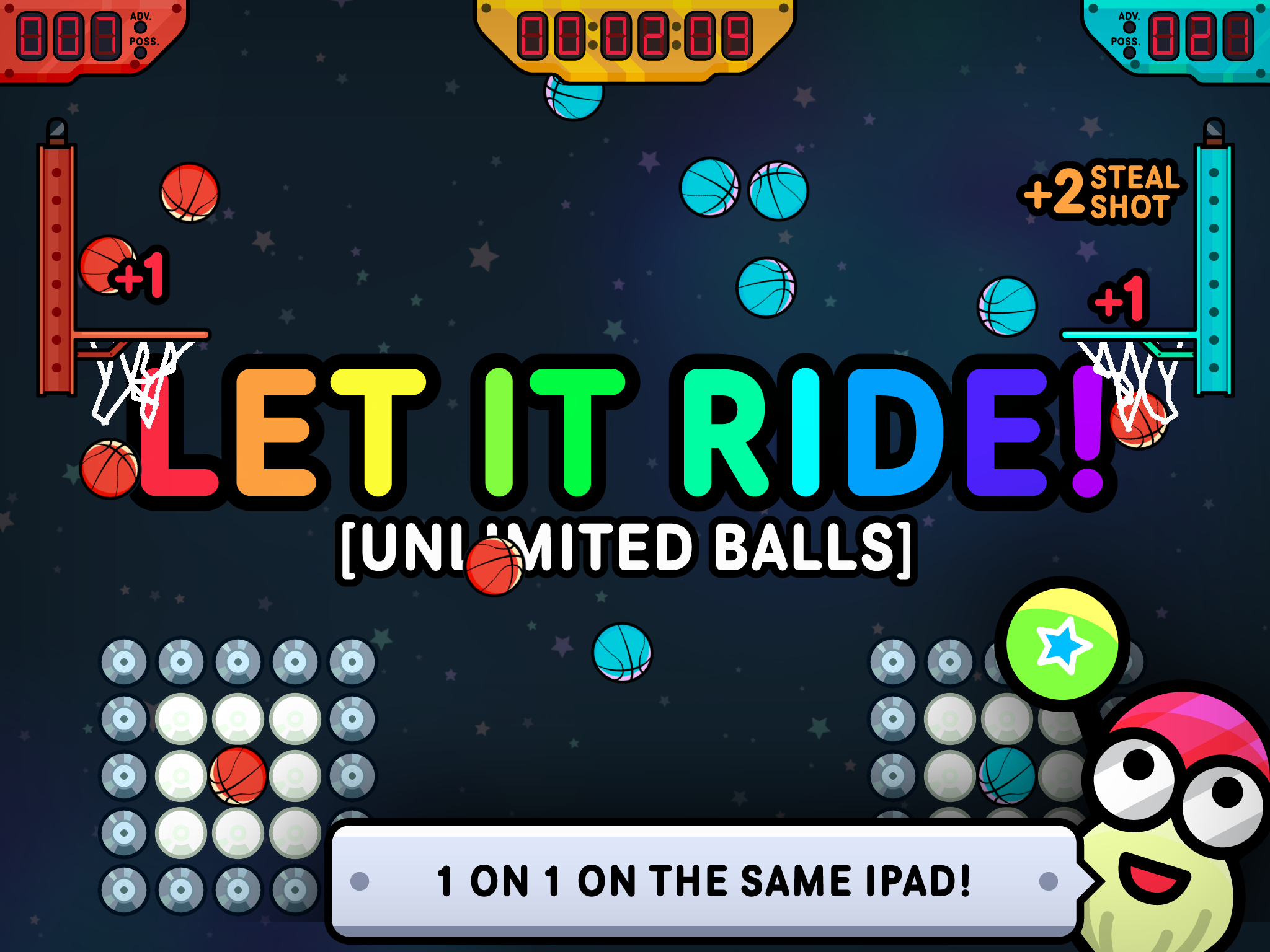
Gasketball gameplay

Riding the earnings from Solipskier, Mikengreg continued to pay themselves their same salary but now had the means to try new ideas. Wohlwend estimated that they discarded about six "fairly polished prototypes" over the development of their next game, Gasketball. They were able to live on $20–25,000 a year each in Iowa for the next two years while working on the new game. Wohlwend made somewhat more income due to other collaborations, such as Puzzlejuice with Asher Vollmer, but shared his income with Boxleiter. Even though Solipskier was successful, the duo did not have a following comparable to indie developers like Team Meat and thus felt like their external pressure was low. Instead, their pressure was internal. Wohlwend said he worked 100-hour weeks with no weekends or vacations while living off of the Solipskier funds. In making Gasketball, Boxleiter and Wohlwend felt that their game quality had improved continually, but found the idea of a million-person audience "daunting" and Wohlwend questioned whether he could even recreate Solipskier's success. When they ran out of money, Boxleiter borrowed money from his parents, and eventually they both went homeless, living off of the couches of friends.

Gasketball was released for iPad on August 9, 2012. They had decided to release the game as what they deemed to be an ethically non-coercive free-to-play game, with a free base game and in-app purchases for the extended content. Not as many players paid for the content as expected. (Note: They were hopeful for 2% of five million downloads to purchase the game (a 2% conversion rate), but in practice, the rate was closer to 0.67%.) This was due, in part, to the players' difficulty in finding the purchase function. The game had been downloaded 200,000 times in its August 2012 launch week and was briefly ranked near the top of an iTunes top downloads ranking, though it did not break the top 200 grossing chart.

== TouchTone ==
In TouchTone's puzzles (left), the player rearranges the items on screen to redirect a beam of light to its destination. The player is at the center of a story about government surveillance told through hacked emails (right), which are unlocked by completing puzzles.

After Gasketball's release, Boxleiter and Wohlwend planned a celebratory road trip to a game jam in Victoria, British Columbia. The game did not fare as expected, so Boxleiter wanted to use the jam to create "something new, ... something really small and perfect". By the end of the two-day jam, the core mirror reflection mechanics of TouchTone were in place, though it would take two years of sporadic work to finalize the remainder of the game. In TouchTone, the player monitors phone calls as part of a government surveillance program to find public threats. The story is told through a series of reflection puzzles wherein the player swipes the screen to reflect a beam around a room to its intended destination.

Mikengreg felt that their first theme of light, prisms, and audio signal too closely mimicked "a hacking minigame from a bigger AAA game like BioShock or System Shock", but eventually paired the concept with a satirical Edward Snowden theme following the mid-2013 global surveillance disclosures. Their original efforts were jocular, but their concept became more serious as the story and "political message" grew deeper. Boxleiter wrote most of the script, which is over 20,000 words. It was his first effort at professional writing, and it took him five months. He and Wohlwend would conference after each chapter for coherency. Boxleiter wanted the story to explore the "questions ... floating around the national consciousness" rather than be "heavy-handed" and prescriptive. They playtested the game in public at the theater in Logan Square, Chicago, though they acknowledged difficulty in playtesting the story's private experience. Mikengreg decided against including an option to skip puzzles, which they felt would spoil the game and the player's capacity to adapt to increasing difficulty. They called this philosophy the "Derek Yu (of Spelunky) school of game design". TouchTone was released on March 19, 2015 for iOS. Review aggregator Metacritic characterized its reviews as generally favorable.

== Notes and references ==
Notes
