= Overland (video game) =

- Steam cover art
- Developer: Finji
- Publisher: Finji
- Engine: Unity
- Platforms: iOS, Linux, macOS, Nintendo Switch, PlayStation 4, Windows, Xbox One, PlayStation 5
- Release: WW: September 19, 2019; PAL: September 30, 2019 (PS4); PlayStation 5: WW: December 13, 2022
- Genre: Strategy
- Mode: Single-player

Overland is a turn-based tactics video game developed and published by Finji. It was released in September 2019 for iOS and macOS through Apple Arcade, Linux, Nintendo Switch, PlayStation 4, Windows, and Xbox One, and in December 2022 for PlayStation 5.

== Gameplay ==
The player navigates a survivor, a dog, and their car, through turn-based tactical scenarios in a post-apocalyptic world.

The objective of the game is to reach California on an across the country road trip. There are currently 7 biomes: the East Coast, the Woodlands, the Grasslands, the Mountains, the Desert, the Basin, and the Reef.

== Development ==
Inspirations for the game include X-COM, The Banner Saga, and Dead of Winter: A Cross Roads Game.

Overland was released on September 19, 2019, for Nintendo Switch, PlayStation 4, Windows, and Xbox One platforms. Early version of the game were available through Itch.io. The game was also released on iOS and macOS through Apple Arcade as a launch title on the same day.

== Reception ==
Reception

Aggregate scores
Aggregator	Score
Metacritic	NS: 75/100; PC: 69/100
OpenCritic	71/100; 40% Critics Recommend

Review scores
Publication	Score
Edge	5/10
GameSpot	8/10
IGN	7.5/10
Nintendo Life	6/10
Nintendo World Report	6/10
PC Gamer (US)	62/100
TouchArcade	2.5/5

Upon release, Overland received mixed reviews by users and critics.

=== Accolades ===
Overland won the award for "Best Art Design" at Intel Level Up 2016. The game was nominated for the Matthew Crump Cultural Innovation Award at the SXSW Gaming Awards.
