= Neo Cab =

- Developer: Chance Agency (Note: Additional work by Sweet Baby Inc.)
- Publisher: Fellow Traveller
- Producers: Patrick Ewing; Felix Kramer
- Engine: Unity
- Platforms: Windows macOS; Nintendo Switch iOS tvOS
- Release: iOS, macOS, tvOS; September 19, 2019; Windows, Nintendo Switch; October 3, 2019
- Genre: Visual novel
- Mode: Single-player

Neo Cab is a 2019 video game developed by Chance Agency and published by Fellow Traveller. It was originally released for iOS, macOS and tvOS as through Apple Arcade on September 19, 2019, as well as Windows and Nintendo Switch on October 3, 2019. In it, players role play as Lina, a driver for Neo Cab, a vehicle for hire service. After her friend Savy mysteriously disappears, Lina investigates the disappearance while picking up passengers.

== Synopsis ==
The game opens with Lina moving from her hometown, Cactus Flats, to the technological metropolis Los Ojos. She has plans to live with Savy, an old friend she hasn't spoken to in years after they had a large argument. Lina briefly meets up with Savy, who says that she's having trouble at work and will meet up with her later. She also gives her a FeelGrid, a smartwatch-like device that displays a color corresponding to the emotions that the wearer is feeling. After Lina picks up passengers for a few hours, Savy texts her that she needs to be picked up right away, then disappears.

Simmering in the background is a movement to have all drivers replaced by driverless cars owned by a corporation called Capra. Lina had previously been fired by Capra after they replaced their rideshare with driverless cars. Many of the conversations she has with passengers are about a proposed law to outlaw driving after a famous ballet dancer was killed after being hit by a car.

== Gameplay ==
Game Informer calls Neo Cab a "visual novel mixed with survival aspects". The game is driven by the choices that the player makes when talking to passengers. Those choices and the flow of the conversation then change Lina's mood, which is displayed on the Feelgrid. The way Lina is feeling changes which dialogue options are available, and whether she is willing to pick up another passenger. Players also have to manage the car's fuel level and how much money Lina has.

== Reception ==
Reception

Aggregate score
Aggregator	Score
Metacritic	NS: 75/100; PC: 76/100

Review scores
Publication	Score
Destructoid	6/10
Edge	7/10
Game Informer	8/10
GameSpot	7/10
Nintendo Life	8/10
Nintendo World Report	8/10
PC Gamer (US)	79/100

Destructoid and PC Gamer both pointed out that the game discussed quite a few topics during its short playthrough. Rock, Paper, Shotgun and Game Informer both found the ending underwhelming. However, most of the above critics seemed to enjoy the game overall, especially the passengers and conversations with them. Rock, Paper, Shotgun in particular wished that there was a "free play mode" where one could continue picking up passengers without worrying about the main story.

=== Awards ===
Neo Cab won the award for 'Best Narrative Design' at IndieCade 2019. It was also nominated for 'Game Beyond Entertainment' at the 16th British Academy Games Awards and in the 'Special Class' category at the 2019 NAVGTR Awards.
