= Wilmot Works It Out =

2024 video game

Wilmot Works it Out
- Developers: Hollow Ponds Games, Richard Hogg
- Publisher: Finji
- Engine: Unity
- Platforms: macOS; Windows; Nintendo Switch
- Release: macOS, Windows; October 23, 2024; Switch; May 22, 2025
- Genre: Puzzle
- Mode: Single-player

Wilmot Works it Out is a 2024 puzzle video game developed by Hollow Ponds Games and Richard Hogg and published by Finji. It was released for Windows and MacOS on October 23, 2024. It was later released for Nintendo Switch on May 22, 2025. The game is a sequel to the developer's 2019 game Wilmot's Warehouse.

== Gameplay ==
The player is Wilmot, a square whose postwoman, Sam, delivers tiled puzzle pieces to assemble on his floor, upon completion hanging the image on the wall and prompting the delivery of new puzzle pieces. The puzzles are similar to jigsaw puzzles, requiring the player to simultaneously align and complete pieces, which can be done by picking up and moving the pieces, or pushing them into place. Some puzzles require multiple deliveries from Sam, leading to the player solving them concurrently. Pieces connected to their correct counterpart will flash and play a chime as a hint to the player.

== Development and release ==
Wilmot Works it Out was developed by co-creators Richard Hogg and Ricky Haggett, who both developed the predecessor Wilmot's Warehouse. Haggett stated that the developers considered revisiting the concept after the favorable reception to Wilmot's Warehouse and developed the prototype within "a month or so". The game was inspired by jigsaw puzzles and the developers' enjoyment of "no-boxing" or completing them without first seeing the complete image on the puzzle box. The game was announced on 22 August 2024 alongside the publication of a trailer, and released on 23 October.

== Reception ==
Reception

Aggregate scores
Aggregator	Score
Metacritic	77/100
OpenCritic	92% recommend

Review scores
Publication	Score
Edge	7/10
Eurogamer	4/5
The Guardian	4/5
Siliconera	6/10

According to review aggregator Metacritic, Wilmot Works it Out received "generally favorable" reviews upon release. Fellow review aggregator OpenCritic assessed that the game received strong approval, being recommended by 92% of critics.

Many critics praised the simplicity and relaxing pacing of the game. Describing the game as one played "with a sense of leisurely satisfaction", Parkin commended the "therapeutic" and "soothing" qualities of the game. However, some reviewers considered the game to become repetitive or increasingly difficult, with Edge stating "the level of challenge and ingenuity does plateau around the game's midpoint" due to reaching the maximum size of puzzles.

The game's dialogue were also mostly received positively. Parkin commended its "breezy" dialogue for "adding a bit of human warmth". Russell considered the interactions to be immersive and provide "something of a narrative", but also critiqued the "sense of dissonance" in being given details about the world outside of the foyer and the player's activities in it.
