= Relooted =

2026 video game

- Developer: Nyamakop
- Publisher: Nyamakop
- Designers: Henrike Lode; Erik Prinz; Rodwin Malinga
- Programmers: Kevin Marias; Henry Jooste; Robert Shenton
- Composers: Nick Horsten; Dustin van Wyk
- Engine: Unreal Engine 5
- Platforms: Windows; Xbox Series X/S
- Release: February 10, 2026
- Genre: 2.5D Platformer
- Mode: Single-player

Relooted is a 2026 video game developed by South African studio Nyamakop for Windows and Xbox Series X/S. It is a heist game with African-futurist themes where players work to reclaim cultural artifacts from Western museums. Gameplay consists of puzzle solving to carry out heists with the goal of raising awareness of African history and culture.

Development of the game started in 2018. Ben Myres served as the Creative Director, Mohale Mashigo served as the narrative director, and Sithe Ncube served as the game producer. Ben Myres was inspired by games such as Mirror's Edge, Teardown, and the TV Show Leverage.

Reception on the game has been mixed.

== Plot ==
The game is set in the year 2099 in Johannesburg, South Africa. The world powers have agreed on a treaty called the Transatlantic Returns Treaty for the return of artifacts. An amendment to the treaty subsequently instituted a rule whereby museums only had to return publicly displayed artifacts. Museums responded by quietly removing their artifacts from the public, effectively protecting the artifacts from repatriation.

Professor Grace, a retired South African art historian, had worked on the treaty her entire life and was now fed up with inaction. Since the museums had removed the artifacts from public display, they cannot report them as missing or stolen without revealing they'd been hiding them in the first place. In an abandoned warehouse turned HQ, Professor Grace devises a plan to break into the museums and private collections.

She recruits her grandson Trevor, a locksmith and security systems expert, along with her former Belgian-British student Etienne, who provides them with insider intelligence about what artifacts are being held where.

Nomali, a sports scientist and parkour practitioner, is the protagonist. Trevor explains that he is working with Professor Grace on a much larger scheme. In an effort to protect Grace and Trevor and show them the dangers of their heist, Nomali joins the crew's first mission. After their success, Nomali realizes Professor Grace and Trevor will not stop until the other 69 artifacts are retrieved which convinces her to lead the motley crew. Other characters who join them include Ndede, a Cameroonian acrobat turned food delivery boy, and Fred, a Congolese gadget maker and getaway driver.

The team is joined by a 15-year-old hacker named Cryptic who desperately wants to help the team liberate stolen artifacts. Nomali agrees to let Cryptic join so long as she doesn't neglect her school work.

== Gameplay ==
It is an action-platformer. Heists consist of three phases: the first involves examining the location of the artifact, as well as security features to be overcome; the second involves searching the location while evading alerts and planning an escape route; and the third involves obtaining the artifact and running from security forces.

After the player acquires the artifact, a 30-second countdown begins, the player will encounter drones and non-human entities as they escape from the museum. The player has to escape according to the plan created in the previous phase. Lack of precision and fluidity of movement would lead to an unsuccessful escape due to a gate shutdown or the player's health depletion.

The game uses a two-dimensional interface with layout of the building housing the artifact and obstacles that players must navigate by high-speed running, consecutive jumps, and sliding moves. Despite the movement-based techniques, the player also needs to recruit characters with different ability types and decide where and how to use them. As the game progresses, the difficulty of navigating and creating the pathway gradually increases, requiring players to design more complex strategies and act accordingly to solve the puzzles.

== Development ==
Relooted was developed by South African game studio, Nyamakop. Development of the game started in 2018, and involved a team of about 30 developers. Ben Myres served as the Creative Director, Mohale Mashigo served as the narrative director, and Sithe Ncube served as the game producer.

Lead developer Ben Myres said, "We wanted to make it feel like you're in a heist montage for a movie of your own plan," Myres was inspired by both games such as Mirror's Edge and Teardown, and the TV show Leverage. Myres compared the solutions of each puzzle to solving a broken Rube Goldberg machine, in which players have to solve to progress through the level. Myres also added that Relooted was created to give players an optimistic feeling of the repatriation of cultural artifacts.

Voice actors from the game come from countries such as Nigeria, Angola, Malawi, Ethiopia, Tanzania and Kenya. The artifacts featured in the game are based on real-world objects. The game's soundtrack uses modern synthesizers and traditional African musical instruments. The game's narrative designer described the game as "African Futurist". The game received outside funding, which is not typical for independently published video games, with the budget being around several million dollars. The trailer for the game says “Is it stealing to take back what was stolen?”

== Reception ==
Reception

Aggregate scores
Aggregator	Score
Metacritic	(PC) 70/100
OpenCritic	64% recommend

Review score
Publication	Score
The A.V. Club	B+

The PC version of Relooted received "mixed or average" from critics, according to the review aggregation website Metacritic. Fellow review aggregator OpenCritic assessed that the game received fair approval, being recommended by 64% of critics.

The A.V. Club gave the game a B+.

PC Gamer called it a fine heist game but a better history lesson. PC Gamer noted that Relooted's three phase gameplay was refreshing and well executed. Learning about the 70 historical artifacts that could be repatriated was the writer's favorite part of the game. The reviewer notes that this game is a way to learn about the topic of the repatriation of artifacts as a form of justice.

GameCritics gave the game a score of 8/10 for a compelling story with insufficiently challenging gameplay. The review noted that the game had interesting characters, satisfying heists, and exciting escapes, but that the various levels lacked opportunities for the user to fail. Solutions seemed obvious, with total gameplay only lasting 10 hours. The simpleness of the game dulled the reviewer's enjoyment, leading to a mixed review.

Six One Indie scored Relooted a 6/10 praising the game for its modern stance but criticizing the graphics, noting the repetitiveness of levels and gameplay bugs made it feel incomplete. The reviewer noted that the game received more online hate than it deserved. Like the reviewer in PC Gamer, this reviewer enjoyed the history lessons about the artifacts. However, the game's introduction of new characters with different abilities in each heist made each feel like the tutorial rather than a cohesive part of a larger story. Thus, gameplay felt repetitive, making the game feel like one long demo.

GamingTrend rated the game a 60 out of 100. Positives were noted to be its teaching about historical artifacts and relatable characters. Gameplay challenges such as glitches in commands, inconsistent jumping, and stiff dialogue were noted to be frustrating. GamingTrend describes the premise as advanced but the gameplay seems incomplete. In between heists the player is offered dialog choices, but no matter what the player picks, they receive the same response. This leads to conversations that do not make full sense. When planning heists, some of the decisions did not affect the actual gameplay and as a result, seemed merely decorative. These aspects took away some of the power of the premise and the depth of the characters. The reviewer noted how believable the characters were and how effectively they navigated the ethically ambiguous game premise of “relooting”.

On Steam, the game reached a peak player count of 57 on launch day.
