= KO OP =

Canadian game studio cooperative

KO_OP
- Type: Corporation
- Industry: Video games
- Founded: June 1, 2012; 14 years ago
- Founders: Saleem Dabbous; Bronson Zgeb
- Headquarters: Montreal, Canada
- Products: Gnog; Goodbye Volcano High
- Website: ko-opmode.com

KO_OP is a Canadian game studio cooperative based in Montreal. It was founded in 2012.

== History ==
Studio director Saleem Dabbous and programmer Bronson Zgeb founded KO_OP in 2012 to make "visually arresting avant-garde games". The studio is run as a workers cooperative with equal salary and decision-making between co-owners. Dabbous and Zgeb used personal savings to launch the company and relied on work-for-hire to finance its own games. They struggled with inexperience in their over-scoped early projects, as they moved through a dozen prototypes and eventually cancelled two projects in full production.

Gnog was nominated for Excellence in Visual Art at the 2016 Independent Games Festival and released in 2017. KO_OP also built "The Mirror of Spirits", an expansion for Lara Croft Go, in 2016.

== List of games ==
Game	Platform(s)	Initial release date
GNOG	PlayStation 4	May 2, 2017
GNOG	iOS	November 28, 2017
GNOG	Microsoft Windows	July 17, 2018
GNOG	macOS	July 17, 2018
Winding Worlds	Apple Arcade	May 15, 2020
Depanneur Nocturne	Microsoft Windows	May 26, 2020
Ridiculous Fishing EX	Apple Arcade	July 14, 2023
Goodbye Volcano High	PlayStation 5	August 29, 2023
Goodbye Volcano High	PlayStation 4	August 29, 2023
Goodbye Volcano High	Microsoft Windows	August 29, 2023
Young Suns	Xbox Series X/S	TBA
Young Suns	Xbox One	TBA
Young Suns	Microsoft Windows	TBA
