= Canabalt =

2009 video game

- Publishers: Semi-Secret Software (Flash, iOS); RGCD (C64); Beatshapers (PSP); Kittehface Software (Ouya)
- Designer: Adam Saltsman
- Composer: Danny Baranowsky
- Engine: Flash; Flixel (Flash, iOS); HaxeFlixel (HTML5); Adobe AIR; Unity
- Platforms: Browser; iOS; Commodore 64; Windows; OS X; Linux; PlayStation Portable; Android; Ouya
- Release: 2009: Browser; WW: September 2009 iOS; WW: October 1, 2009 Commodore 64; WW: January 10, 2012 PSP; EU: March 15, 2012; NA: April 3, 2012 Android; WW: March 19, 2012 Ouya; WW: March 28, 2013
- Genre: Endless runner
- Mode: Single-player

Canabalt is a one-button endless runner designed by Adam Saltsman for the Experimental Gameplay Project in 2009. The 2D side-scrolling video game was originally written as a Flash game, then ported to iOS, Android, PlayStation Portable, Ouya, and HTML5. An authorized version for the Commodore 64 called C64anabalt was released on cartridge. Canabalt has been credited with popularizing the endless runner subgenre.

== Gameplay ==
The runner on the left, moving toward the right, has disturbed a flock of birds.

The player controls an unnamed man fleeing from an unknown threat. As the game begins, the player character jumps from the window of an office building onto the roof of a neighboring building. He then proceeds to run forward automatically, continually accelerating as he moves. The only control the player has over the character is through a single button, which makes him jump; either from building to building or over obstacles. Missing a jump to another building will cause him to fall to his death, while colliding with a crate or an office chair will reduce his speed. Bombs are also occasionally dropped into the player's path, causing death if not avoided.

Unlike most platform games with predesigned stages and which can be played to completion, the landscape of Canabalt is procedurally generated and endless. The objective of the game is to achieve the highest score, measured in meters per run. Some versions of the game have online leaderboards, allowing players to compete for ranking.

== Development ==
In a 2013 interview with The New Yorker, developer Adam Saltsman said he had initially aimed for the game to be "fast, like a racing game." He also explained that the player character wears a black suit so that he would stand out from the greyscale background art. The name "Canabalt" was derived from a combination of phrases used by Saltsman's young nephew. When asked about the origins of the main character, Saltsman stated:

I used to have fantasies at my old office job of running down our long, long hallway just for fun. And to literally escape. I'd forgotten about that until months after Canabalt came out. There used to be an intro cinematic that I was designing, where the character receives an email, but it was all getting in the way of the main thing.

== Release and ports ==
Originally released as an Adobe Flash game on Saltsman's own web site, the game has since been ported to many platforms, including iOS, Android, Steam, PlayStation Portable, Ouya and the Chrome Web Store. It is also available on online gaming sites such as Kongregate and Newgrounds. The official Android/Ouya port is published by Kittehface Software, primarily a publisher of live wallpapers, under license from Saltsman. The PlayStation Portable version is published by Beatshapers.

In 2011, Canabalt was ported to the Commodore 64 home computer by Paul Koller. This official conversion became available as a cartridge in January 2012. In March 2012, Canabalt was included in the Humble Bundle for Android 2.

In 2024, Friday Night Funkin' programmer Cameron "ninjamuffin99" Taylor was given the game's original ActionScript 3 source code, which he used to port Canabalt to HTML5 using the HaxeFlixel game engine, a version of Saltsman's Flixel game engine utilizing the Haxe programming language and OpenFL. Cameron has stated that Flixel being an "ancestor" to HaxeFlixel helped with the porting process, and that the HTML5 port is "actually very close to what Adam wrote nearly 15 years ago". Cameron also released the port's source code with Saltsman's permission, and the game was officially updated to the HTML5 version on Newgrounds and the official Canabalt website, with high score boards using Newgrounds' API.

== Reception ==
Reception

Aggregate scores
Aggregator	Score
GameRankings	(iOS) 86% (PSP) 72%
Metacritic	(iOS) 77/100

Review scores
Publication	Score
IGN	(iOS) 8/10
PlayStation Official Magazine – UK	(PSP) 8/10
Pocket Gamer	(iOS) 7/10 (PSP) 7/10
TouchArcade	(iOS) 5/5
148Apps	(iOS) 4/5
Slide to Play	(iOS) 3/4
TouchGen	(iOS) 4/5

Canabalt has met with positive reviews. The iOS version holds aggregate scores of 77 out of 100 on Metacritic, based on 8 reviews, and 86% on GameRankings, also based on 8 reviews. The PSP version holds a score of 72% on GameRankings, based on 7 reviews.

Bonnie Eisenman of 148Apps scored the iOS version 4 out of 5, writing "Canabalt is a gem that daringly mixes simple gameplay with an incredibly complex world, proving that minimalism doesn't have to equal minimal entertainment. If you're looking for a simple, quick-play game, this is one to buy." TouchGen's Torbjorn Kamblad also scored it 4 out of 5, arguing that the iOS version improved on the original Flash version; "Tighter controls, and a better overview of your surroundings make the portable version a classic." TouchArcade's Eli Hodapp scored it 5 out of 5, comparing the game to Doodle Jump; "I've probably sunk more combined hours in to Doodle Jump than any other game on my iPhone, and Canabalt has the exact same appeal. The pixel art graphics are great, the soundtrack is phenomenal, and [...] it's hard to find anything not to like about the game."

IGN's Levi Buchanan scored the game 8 out of 10; "Canabalt is a wonderful twitch game that strikes the right balance between skill and luck [...] There is something really compelling in here – a real desire to play again and again...and again." Pocket Gamer's Keith Andrew scored it 7 out of 10, calling it "a fun little ditty, beautifully presented, but one where success is as much down to luck as it is any skill. That's no doubt all the developers intended, but the sheer addictiveness of play suggests any follow-up that adds a more structure [sic] could give it a serious run for its money." Slide to Play's Andrew Podolsky scored it 3 out of 4, praising the game, but criticizing the $2.99 price; "The nearly-flawless execution of one simple idea makes the lack of a story or any other depth inconsequential, but we [...] think this game would be better priced at a dollar, especially since the original Flash game is still free to play as well."

Pocket Gamer's Peter Willington scored the PSP version 7 out of 10. He criticized the lack of online leaderboards, but concluded that "Canabalt for PSP deserves a place on your memory stick. It has a hidden depth that the hardcore will appreciate immensely, and it's built in such a way that more casual gamers can dip into it quickly between games of more substance."

The game was listed among the best of 2009 by numerous video game websites, including Rock, Paper, Shotgun and Eurogamer.

In May 2011, Lewis Denby of PC Gamer placed it at #13 in his list of "20 free PC games you must play." In November 2012, Canabalt was included in the permanent collection of video games at the Museum of Modern Art.

== Legacy ==
Canabalt sparked the genre of "endless running" games; The New Yorker described Canabalt as "a video game that has sparked an entirely new genre of play for mobile phones." Game designer Scott Rogers credits side-scrolling shooters like Scramble (1981) and Moon Patrol (1982) and chase-style game play in platform games like Disney's Aladdin (1994) and Crash Bandicoot (1996) as early forerunners to the genre. Derivative titles include Robot Unicorn Attack, which Kieron Gillen described in his "2010 Game of the Year" piece for Eurogamer, as a "shameless Canabalt clone." Similarly, in Joystiq's review of Halfbrick Studios' Jetpack Joyride, Ben Gilbert argued that "Doom is to Halo, as Canabalt is to Jetpack Joyride."

The source code of Canabalt was released by Saltsman in 2010. The engine specific code was released under an MIT License and the game code under a proprietary license. One year later, Saltsman concluded that commercially, this had proved a non-harmful step.
