= Guildlings =

2019 video game

- Developer: Sirvo Studios
- Publisher: Sirvo Studios
- Director: Jamie Antonisse
- Producer: Ryan Sullivan
- Designers: Danyel Copeland; Adam Hann-Byrd
- Programmers: Jon Culp; Ryan Sullivan; Asher Vollmer
- Artists: Ellen Alsop; Suzanne Geary; Mackenzie Schubert; Kyle Youngblom
- Writers: Danyel Copeland; Adam Hann-Byrd
- Composer: Pedro Silva
- Platforms: iOS, macOS, tvOS
- Release: November 8, 2019
- Genres: Adventure, role-playing
- Mode: Single-player

Guildlings is a 2019 role-playing adventure game developed and published by Sirvo Studios. It was released for Apple Arcade on November 8, 2019. Upon release, Guildlings received generally favorable reviews, with praise directed towards the game's sincere tone, and the presentation of its narrative, characters and dialogue based on themes of friendship.

== Development ==
Guildlings was developed by indie studio Sirvo Studios, a team of eleven people. Asher Vollmer, who had previously developed Puzzlejuice and Threes, co-founded Sirvo with Jamie Antonisse and Ryan Sullivan Development began after the studio was financed by the Indie Fund. Vollmer said in 2022 that he felt the game was "misaligned from his personal design sensibilities", though he praised the development team.

The game's story, according to Sirvo, was inspired by EarthBound, Inkle's 80 Days, and fictional works incorporating themes of wonder.

The game was intended to be released in an episodic format, with the currently released content intended to be Chapter 1, but Antonisse clarified on X in 2023 that future content had been cancelled due to the game being a financial disappointment to Sirvo. Despite the fact that the developers attempted to continue the story in related concepts between 2021 and 2022, the original development team had disbanded.

As of November 1st, 2024, Guildlings was removed from the App Store and is now unavailable to play or for download.

== Reception ==
Reception

Aggregate score
Aggregator	Score
Metacritic	77/100

Review scores
Publication	Score
Destructoid	8.5/10
Mutliplayer.it	7.8

According to the review aggregator website Metacritic, Guildlings received "generally favorable" reviews. Patricia Hernandez of Polygon praised Guildlings for reinventing the game's role-playing game mechanics to fit the "optimistic" and "happy-go-lucky" tone of the game, highlighting its "terrific" characters and writing and the use of the mood system. Giorgio Melani of Multiplayer.it commended the "aesthetic cleanliness" of the game's visual presentation, the "clever parody and sincere homage to fantasy role-playing games" and "fresh and pressing" narrative, although finding the gameplay was largely confined to the story. Kevin Mersereau of Destructoid highlighted the "beautiful" story about friendship supported by sincere character interactions and "gorgeous" soundtrack, whilst expressing frustration with the game's technical issues and the plot's ending on a cliffhanger.
