= Zego =

Rackmount server platform based on the PlayStation 3

The ZEGO ("Zest to go") is a rackmount server platform built by Sony, targeted for the video post-production and broadcast markets. The platform is based on Sony's PlayStation 3 as it features both the Cell Processor as well as the RSX 'Reality Synthesizer'. It is aimed to greatly speed up postproduction work (in particular in the computationally extremely taxing 4K resolution), 3D rendering and video processing. In some respects it is rather similar to IBM's QS20/21/22 blades (such as used in the Roadrunner supercomputer that took the top spot in the Top500 in May 2008), although Sony seems to target the DCC (Digital Content Creation) markets rather than scientific like IBM, which can be seen by the inclusion of the RSX graphics processor in the ZEGO platform.

ZEGO runs Fixstars's Yellow Dog Enterprise Linux, which was also Sony's favourite Linux distribution for the PlayStation 3.

== Architecture ==
The architecture is not identical to the PlayStation 3. One difference is that the BCU-100 has 1 GB XDR RAM instead of the PlayStation 3's 256 MB. Video RAM is missing in Sony's system diagrams, but it is listed as 256 MB (like the PlayStation 3) further down in the tech specs. The XDR memory is shared by both the Cell and RSX. Sony uses the SCC (Super Companion Chip) to handle I/O tasks (HDD, USB 2.0, Gigabit Ethernet and other unspecified I/O); the SCC has its own dedicated memory of 1 GB DDR2 as well as a Memory Extension Adapter connected via PCI Express that can hold up to 8 GB. Another option for the single PCI express slot is a Video Display Board with a DVI-I output.

Further, the Cell in the BCU-100 offers the full 8 SPUs that Cell is manufactured with, as opposed to the 6 SPUs available in the PlayStation 3, which has one SPU disabled to improve manufacturing yields and one reserved for the system. This gives the BCU-100 an extra 33% potential CPU-power (or 51.2 GFLOPS more).

== History ==
Sony presented its first ZEGO product, the BCU-100, to the public at SIGGRAPH 2008 in mid-August. Sony plans to ship the BCU-100 by the end of 2008 and deliver it with the Mental Ray raytracer by Mental Images to speed up 3D rendering tasks and Houdini Batch by Side Effects Software. The company claims to be in talk with other software makers in the DCC field to port and optimize their software for the ZEGO platform.

ZEGO is similar to a workstation based on the PlayStation 2 architecture called the GScube, which was also shown at Siggraph in the year 2000, and which, although used for visualization in a few movie projects, ultimately failed in the market. However, while the GScube only targeted realtime visualization in 1080p HD, ZEGOs target markets are much broader, encompassing for example physics simulation, final 3D rendering and video processing as well as visualization. It remains to be seen if ZEGO actually manages what the GScube was unable to do.

The massively parallel design of the GScube, being not much more than 16 Graphics Synthesizer chips with dedicated RAM, inspired the design of the Cell processor itself with its 8 SPUs with dedicated RAM.

As of August 2009 the device appears to have been discontinued. Searches on Sony.com and pro.sony.com for either Zego or BCU-100 return nothing but the year-old press release claiming the product would ship within a few months.

== Technical specifications ==
=== BCU-100 ===
- 1U rackmount unit
- 3.2 GHz Cell/B.E. CPU
- RSX (connected to Cell via a 20 GB/s up- and 15 GB/s downstream link)
- SCC (connected to Cell via a 5 GB/s link)
- 1 GB XDR RAM with ECC (Cell and RSX, 25.6 GB/s Bandwidth)
- 1 GB DDR2 SDRAM (SCC)
- 2x Gigabit Ethernet
- 3x USB 2.0
- 1x PCI Express 4-lane (hosts either the Memory Extension Adapter or the Video Display Board)
- 160 GB 3.5" SATA harddrive
- <330 Watts power consumption
- optional BDCU-EX1 Memory Extension Adapter with 8 GB RAM
- optional BKCU-VD1 Video Display Board with DVI-I (for using the BCU-100 as a Workstation)

== See also ==
- GScube
