= Gearheads (video game) =

1996 video game

- North American cover
- Developers: Philips Media, R/GA Interactive
- Publisher: Philips Media
- Producer: Stacy Koumbis
- Designers: Frank Lantz; Eric Zimmerman
- Programmer: Ephraim Cohen
- Artist: Susan Brand
- Composer: Michael Sweet
- Platforms: Mac OS, Microsoft Windows
- Release: June 1996
- Genre: Strategy
- Modes: Single-player, multiplayer

Gearheads is a strategy video game developed by R/GA Interactive and Philips Media, and published by Philips Media for Microsoft Windows and Mac OS in June 1996. The player deploys wind-up toys to get them across an arena while attempting to prevent toys from crossing from the other side. Players can play against the computer or another player. Single, customisable games can be played, or the player can play a series of games with set rules and a limited number of lives in a tournament.

The game was designed by Eric Zimmerman and Frank Lantz, and developed in eighteen months. A major part of the game's design was the toys' interaction with each other, and the effectiveness of certain toy setups led Zimmerman and Lantz to coin a term for them. Critical reception was mixed, with some reviewers praising its addictiveness and others criticising its sounds and artificial intelligence.

== Gameplay ==
A typical game in the factory in progress. At the top and bottom are stoppers. At the centre are teleporters. There is a powerup key at the bottom-right.

A strategy video game, Gearheads is played by releasing toys on an arena floor. The goal is to get them to the other side, and prevent the opponent's toys from reaching the player's side. In single-player mode, the player always plays on the right-hand side. Toys are charged while waiting before they are released. They stop when they run out of energy. There are different types of toys, such as robots, Father Christmas, and magicians. Each toy has its own specifications. These include speed, movement pattern (straight, diagonal, or erratic) and special abilities. For example, the Walking Timebomb explodes when it runs out of energy, destroying nearby toys. Deadhead, a skull toy, "scares" toys it comes into contact with so they reverse direction. A chicken toy called Clucketta has the ability to hatch fry toys. Some toys are primarily intended for offence, others for defence. Some are immune to the special abilities of other toys: for example, Big Al (a bulldozer) is unaffected by attacks from Disasteroids (a robot that can also destroy toys, like the Walking Timebomb).

The player can switch between the available toys at any time. Once released, players have no direct control over them, and they do not belong to a player: a toy leaving the arena via the left side scores a point for the player on the right side and vice versa. The first player to score 21 points wins, unless he is only ahead by one point, in which case the game continues until there is a two-point difference. There is an unlimited supply of toys, and they are released in a row in the arena. Toys can be recharged by Handy, a glove toy.

There are four main arenas: kitchen, garden, frozen pond, and factory. The kitchen has no obstacles. The garden's main obstacles are bugs, mud, and rocks. The frozen pond's main obstacles are cracks in the ice which, if crossed over enough times, become holes that destroy toys that fall into them. The factory levels can feature obstacles such as conveyor belts, teleporters, and stoppers. Occasionally, a Powerup Key (a metal winding key) will appear on one side of the arena. When crossed, a power-up is granted to the player on the opposite side. Powerups include a one-shot rocket, being able to release toys from halfway across the arena, and the opponent being unable to release toys. Most powerups last only for a limited time.

There are two game modes: tournament and duel. In tournament, the player is assigned a selection of four toys (toy selections are referred to as "toyboxes") and must defeat the computer-controlled opponent. Every three victories, there is a challenge in a special arena where the player must defeat the opponent with only one toy in the toybox. A life is granted if won (the player starts with three). Duel is where players can practise a game against either a computer opponent or another player. The arena where the game takes place, the toys in the players' toyboxes, the difficulty level, and whether powerups are available can be customised.

== Development ==
Frank Lantz and Eric Zimmerman at R/GA Interactive designed Gearheads; it was produced in co-operation with Philips Media. Susan Brand Studios handled art and animation. Other companies involved in the development included R/GA Interactive's parent company R/GA Digital Studios, XXCAL, and Elias Associates. The Windows and Mac OS versions were released in June 1996. A Super Nintendo Entertainment System (SNES) version was developed and scheduled for late 1996, but never released.

The game took 18 months to develop. Early in the design process, the designers were able to create new toys and tweak their attributes using a playable prototype. The prototype had menus that showed the statistics for each toy. Alterations took effect immediately, allowing the designers to see what effect a change would have even during a game. There was an iterative game testing process that assisted in balancing the game. An important aspect of the game's design was the interaction between the toys.

Due to the discovery of effective toy combinations, Zimmerman and Lantz coined the term "engine" to describe them. The engines were given names including Punching Roaches, Bomb Shield, and Perpetual Motion. Toy attributes were set to make certain engines possible, although most were discovered as development progressed. The artificial intelligence (AI) included engine-based heuristics so the AI was aware of advantageous combinations. Engines were not written into the game's rules, but were playing patterns that arose from the attributes that defined the toys. During the testing, Zimmerman and Lantz kept increasing the difficulty so the game would challenge them, and at one point made the game too difficult.

== Reception ==
Reception

Review scores
Publication	Score
PC Gamer (UK)	60% (PC)
PC Zone	9/10 (PC)
Computer Games Strategy Plus	4/5 (PC)
Gamer's Zone	4/5 (PC)
Coming Soon Magazine	67% (PC)
Entertainment Weekly	B−
PC Team	90%
The Electric Playground	9/10 (PC)
Génération 4	3/5 (PC)
MacUser	3/5

Gearheads received mixed reviews. Reviewers praised the game's addictiveness, visuals, and entertainment value, but were conflicted over the sound and music.

PC Zone lauded the game's addictiveness, saying it features the planning aspects of Tetris and plenty of options, including "bizarre" powerups. Another reviewer who found the game addictive wrote in Computer Gaming World that this was due to its "eclectic cast of characters". Michael Bertrand of Gamer's Zone also agreed the game was addictive.

Steve Wartofsky of Computer Games Strategy Plus said that Gearheads is just what it claims to be: "a furious war of wind-up toys". Computer Gaming World agreed with this view of its entertainment value, describing the game as "hilarious and addictive". PC Team's reviewers called the game "great fun", and liked the gameplay's facility. These sentiments were echoed by Garrett Rowe of The Irish Times, who said the multiplayer mode's fun factor was "endless and chaotic".

Critics thought highly of the graphics. PC Gamer's Dean Evans believed they were "pretty". This sentiment was echoed by other reviewers including Bob Strauss of Entertainment Weekly, and PC Team's reviewers, who said the game was "cute and well done". Similar views were held by Victor Lucas of The Electric Playground, who described the game as "sweet as honey" and praised the toys' animations.

Other compliments included Lucas's approval of the music as "perfectly suited" to the action, and the sound as "truly wonderful". He said he was "immensely" impressed by the game. Garrett Rowe of The Irish Times described Gearheads as "unusual and original"; he also felt the game was "refreshingly different" from cloned games. Joystick's reviewers believed that Gearheads's concept was attractive to beginners.

Criticisms included those of Mike McGrath of Coming Soon Magazine who commented that the game is "far too mindless", describing the sound and music as "annoying". Michael Bertrand of Gamer's Zone also criticised the sound and music as "repetitive", and disliked that the game only has four arenas. PC Gamer's Dean Evans believed that Gearheads has a "childish" nature and is "dull and overpriced". Bob Strauss of Entertainment Weekly's criticism was the difficulty of controlling the game with a keyboard due to the speed of the action. Another complaint came from GamePro's Air Hendrix who criticised the artificial intelligence as "moronic". The concept was found to be uninteresting for hardcore gamers by Joystick's reviewers, and one was not optimistic about the game's life span. Génération 4 cited the inability to increase the size of the game board as a fault.

Hendrix of GamePro reviewed the SNES version and said the graphics were colourful and humorous. It was criticised by Electronic Gaming Monthly for having a "Lack of strategic depth".
