= Decodoku =

Online citizen science game

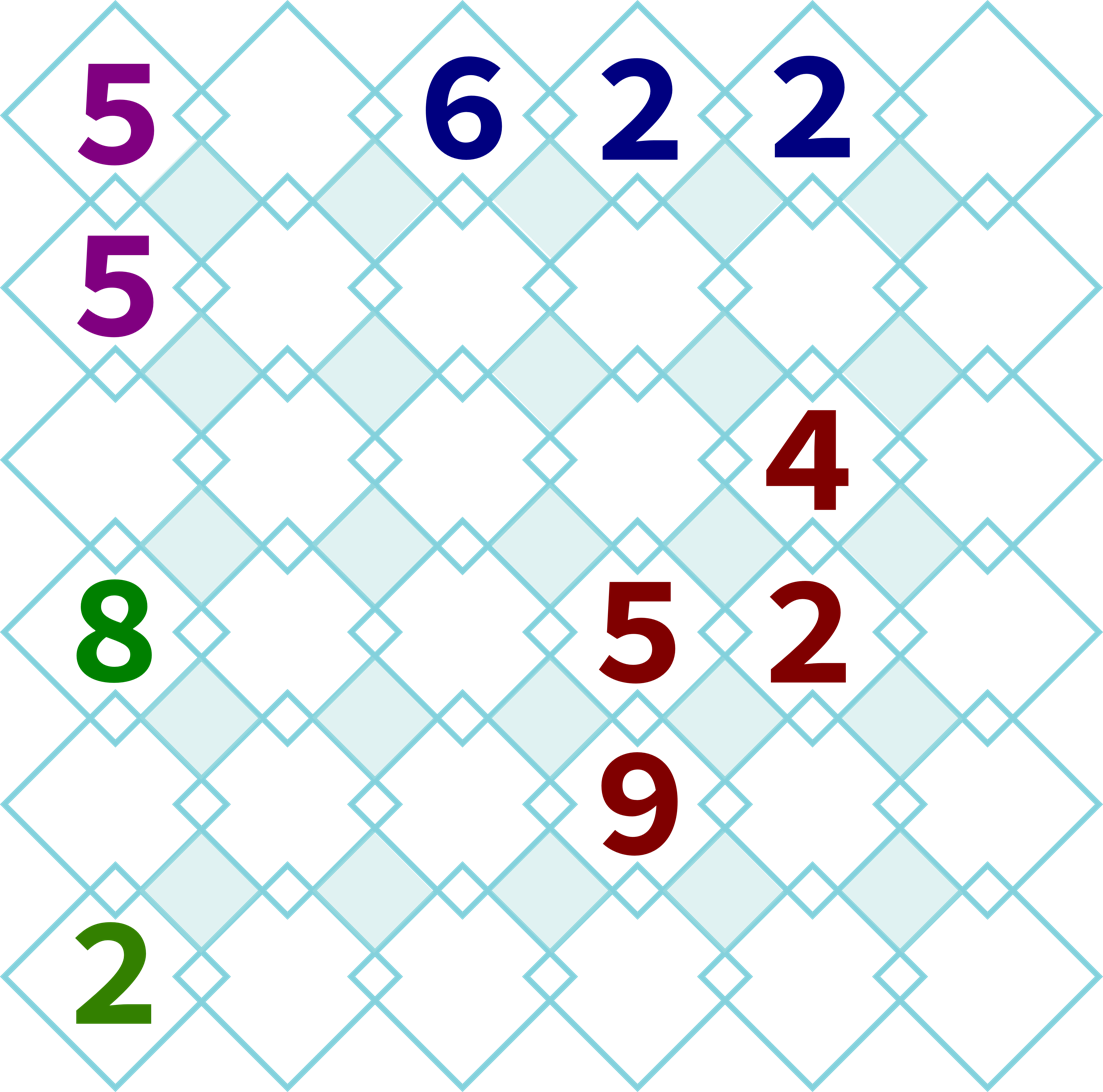
- Image of a Decodoku puzzle
- Developers: NCCR QSIT, University of Basel
- Initial release: 2016
- Operating system: Cross-platform (iOS, Android, Browser)
- Available in: English, German
- Type: Citizen science, Online game, Quantum physics
- License: MIT License
- Website: www.decodoku.com

Decodoku is set of online citizen science games, based on quantum error correction. The project is supported by the NCCR QSIT and the University of Basel, and allows the public to get involved with quantum error correction research.

The games present the clues left in a quantum computer when errors occur, and encourage the players to work out how best to correct them. These puzzles are presented in a manner similar to typical casual puzzle games, like 2048, Threes or Sudoku, with the scientific background explained via the project website and YouTube channel. Thus far three games have been released: Decodoku, Decodoku:Puzzles and Decodoku:Colors.
