= Frank Lantz =

American video game designer

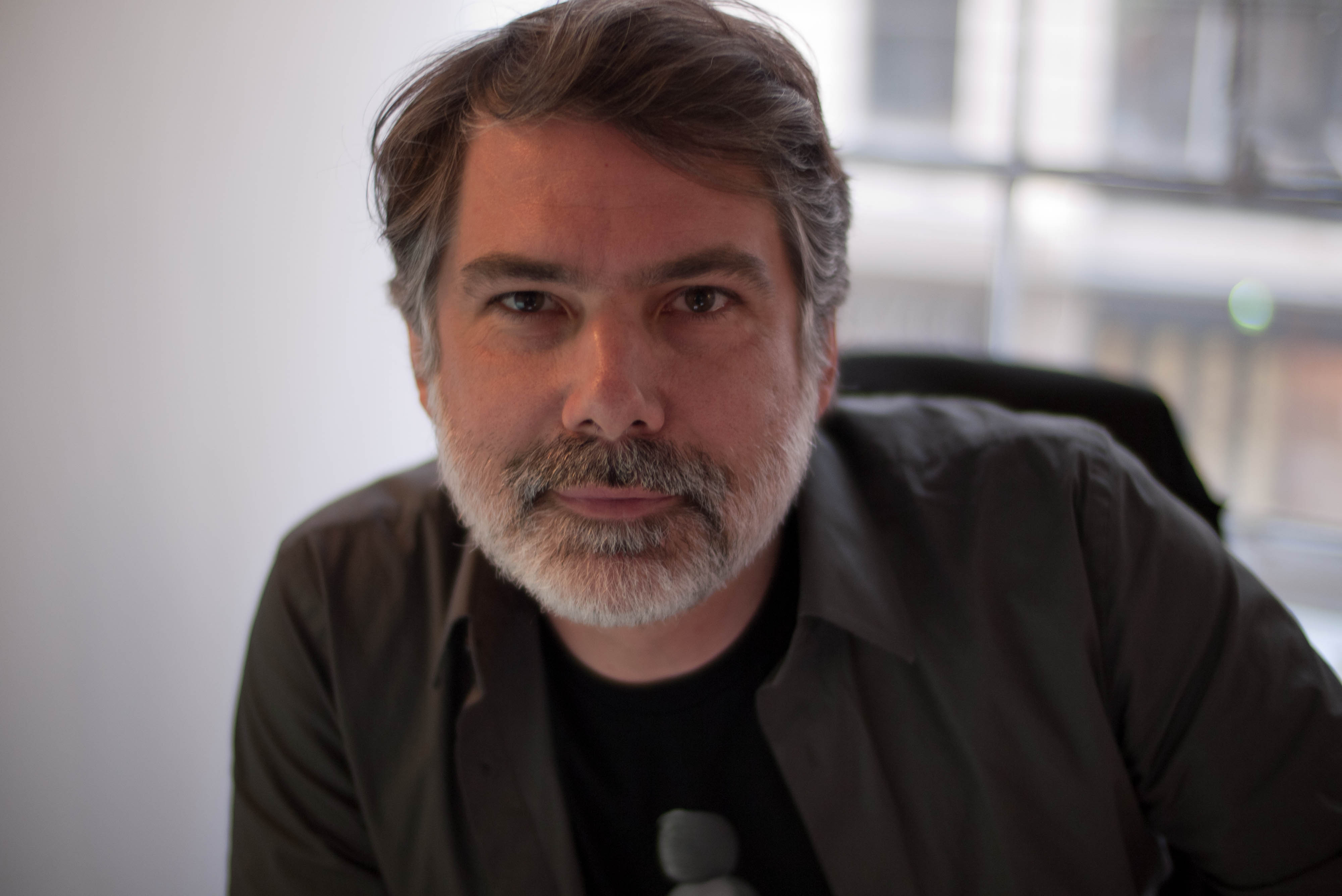
- Lantz at work in the area/code studio
- Born: December 17, 1963 (age 62); Kansas City, Missouri, U.S.
- Occupations: Director of New York University Game Center, co-founder of area/code
- Spouse: Hilary Lantz
- Children: James Lantz

Frank Lantz (born December 17, 1963) is an American video game designer. He is the Founding Chair, now Chair Emeritus of the New York University Game Center. For over 12 years, Lantz taught game design at NYU's Interactive Telecommunications Program. He has also taught at the School of Visual Arts and Parsons School of Design. His writings on games, technology, and culture have appeared in a variety of publications. In 2012, The New York Times referred to Lantz as a "reigning genius of the mysteries of games" following his design of iPhone puzzle game Drop7.

In 2005 he co-founded area/code, a New York-based developer that created cross-media, location-based, and social network games. In 2011 area/code was acquired by Zynga and became Zynga New York. Lantz has worked in the field of game development for the past 20 years. Before starting area/code, he worked on a wide variety of games as the Director of Game Design at Gamelab, Lead Game Designer at Pop & Co, and Creative Director at R/GA Interactive. In 2012, Lantz contributed an interview to the Critical Path Project.

Lantz also had a cameo in the 1987 film Redneck Zombies, as "the crazy hitchhiker".

In 2017, Lantz created Universal Paperclips, an incremental game in which players manage an artificial intelligence focused on maximizing paperclip production. The game went viral and was praised for its exploration of the unintended consequences of optimization.

== Credits ==
=== Video games ===
- Gearheads (1996), Philips Interactive
- Junkbot (2001), Lego Group
- Spybot: The Nightfall Incident (2002), Lego Group
- Diner Dash (2004), PlayFirst
- Pac-Manhattan (2004), New York University
- Drop7 (2009), Zynga
- CSI: Crime City (2010), Ubisoft
- Universal Paperclips (2017)
- Hey Robot (2020), Everybody House Games
- Babble Royale (2021), Everybody House Games
- Q-UP (2025), Everybody House Games
