= Asher Vollmer =

American indie video game developer (born 1989)

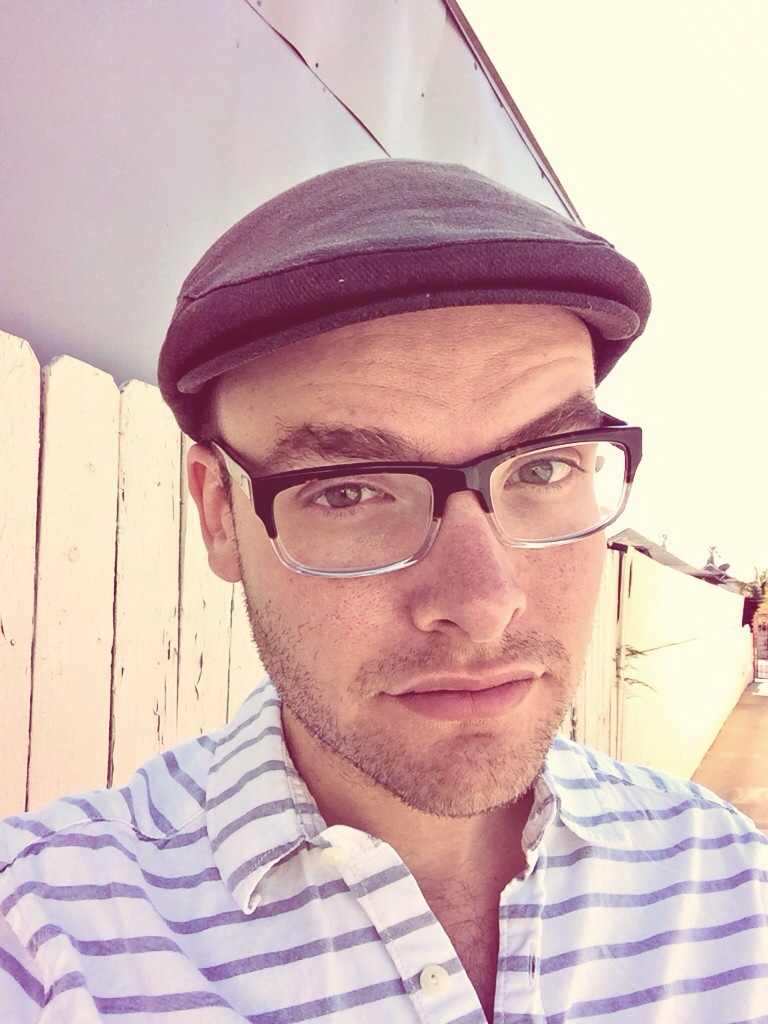
- Vollmer in 2014
- Born: September 14, 1989 (age 37)
- Occupation: Indie video game developer
- Known for: Threes
- Website: ashervollmer.tumblr.com/home

Asher Vollmer (born September 14, 1989) is an American indie video game developer. He created Puzzlejuice and Threes. Vollmer also worked on Guildlings and Beast Breaker.

While a student at USC Interactive Media & Games Division, he developed the 2012 iOS game Puzzlejuice with Greg Wohlwend. The pair's next game, the 2014 iOS puzzle game Threes, received numerous awards and was later ported to multiple platforms. Among other projects, Vollmer subsequently worked on Close Castles, a real-time strategy game later put on hiatus, and Royals, a simulation game for OS X and Windows.

== Career ==
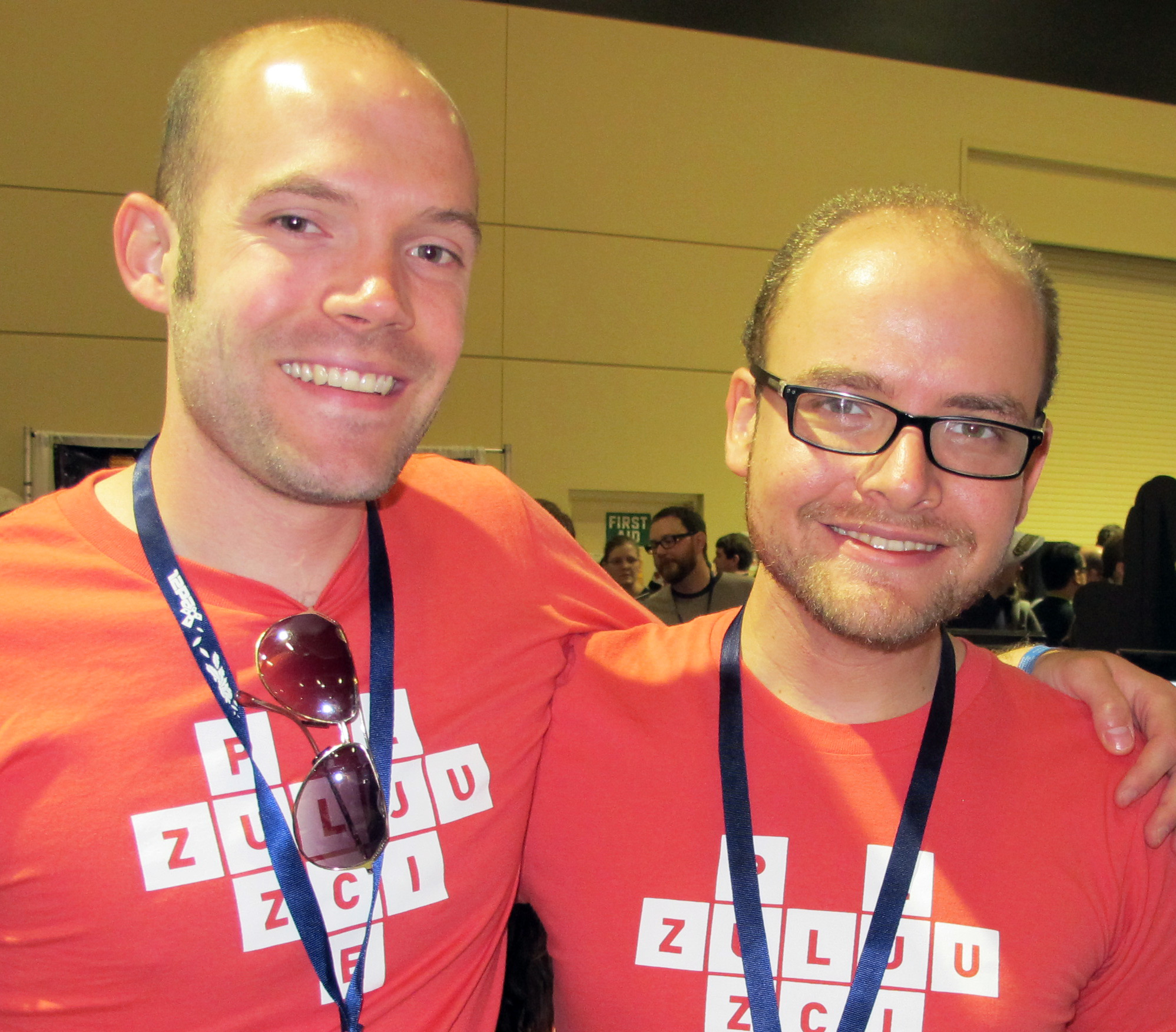
Vollmer (right) with Puzzlejuice artist Wohlwend at the 2012 PAX 10

Vollmer is a graduate of the USC Interactive Media & Games Division program. As a student, he began work on Puzzlejuice, a puzzle video game. He reached out to artist Greg Wohlwend for aesthetic advice, which led to a collaboration between the two. Puzzlejuice is a combination of Tetris, tile-matching, and Boggle: players rearrange falling tetromino blocks into rows of similar colors, which turn into letters that are cleared from the board by forming words. The iOS game was released on January 19, 2012, to what review aggregator Metacritic described as "generally favorable" reviews. Multiple reviewers mentioned the difficulty in mentally balancing the various components of the game.

Vollmer started as thatgamecompany's "feel engineer" in August 2012, but left in April 2013 to "go indie" and work on his own projects. On his blog, he said he thought the studio's current project would be groundbreaking, though he was unhappy working there. Vollmer tried to write a short story in an attempt to take a break from games. Before long, he began to play with his computer keyboard. Vollmer challenged himself to make a game that only used the arrow keys, and prototyped what would become Threes in ten hours overnight. He proceeded to iterate on the idea with Wohlwend over the game's 14-month development. In Threes, the player slides numbered tiles on a four-by-four grid to combine addends and multiples of three. Vollmer cited Drop7 as an inspiration for the game, having played it for two years beforehand.

Threes gameplay

Threes had no original inclination towards minimalism. In fact, Vollmer and Wohlwend felt that the game needed to appear more complex so as to interest players. They returned to the original idea and added character personalities to the tiles. The iOS game was released on February 6, 2014, to what Metacritic characterized as "universal acclaim". Reviewers found the game "charming" and "addictive", and compared it to Drop7 (2009), Triple Town (2010), and Stickets (2013). Eurogamer and TouchArcade awarded the game perfect scores, with the latter calling Threes "about as close as it gets to a perfect mobile game". Other developers released similar games and clones within weeks of the game's launch. Apple named Threes its best iPhone game of 2014. The game was later ported to Android, Xbox One, and Windows Phone platforms. Polygon included Vollmer in their "50 admirable gaming people of 2014" for his work on Threes.

Vollmer thought he would work on a new game a month after releasing Threes, but was kept busy by obligations to fix and update the game, to port it to other platforms, and to promote game through press and events. He was convinced that he would never make a game "as clean and tight as Threes ever again". Vollmer's next game was Close Castles, a real-time strategy game.

=== After Threes ===
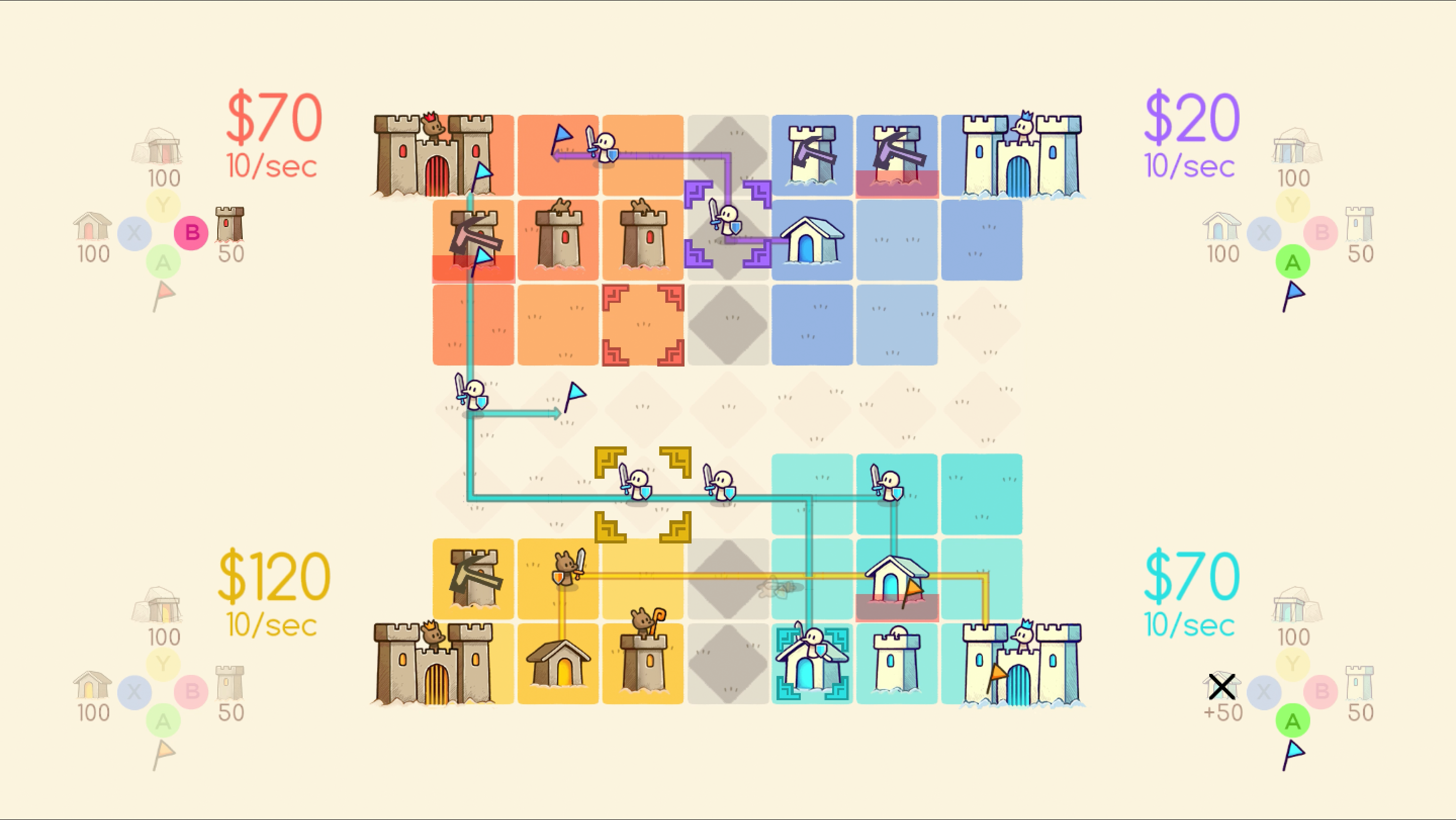
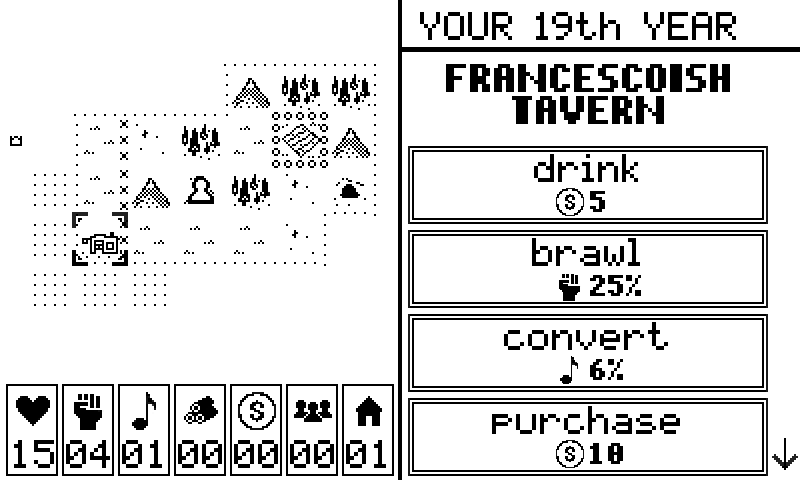
Close Castles and Royals

Vollmer unveiled Close Castles in June 2014. Players start in corners of a "grid map" and are represented by castles. Vollmer explained that the game's name is from castles built too close to one another, starting a mutually assured destruction scenario. Players can build three structure types out from their castle: towers that fire at incoming enemies (defense), houses that make "loyal subjects" (offense), and markets that make money (economy). The "A" button with a direction constructs a path directing followers to the enemy. Followers capture enemy structures as denoted by a "defense bar" that fills as followers enter the structure and that destroys the structure when filled. Markets are the weakest structure, and two towers can defend against one house. Player turf grows as player structures approach the limits of their area. Players earn five units of money a second, which increases by five for every market. Polygon called the game's simple visual design "horrifyingly deceptive". Vollmer has said that games should last around three minutes apiece and that the local multiplayer's lack of "hidden information" should make interactions with other players less of a "sadomasochistic" game of waiting for an opponent to concede. The game was demoed on an Xbox 360 but was planned for release on the PlayStation 4. Vollmer put the project on hold while he worked out "fundamental flaws" in the gameplay.

While Vollmer traditionally worked on multiple games at once, Close Castles was his only project when it was in production. In March 2015, he worked three days a week on a bigger project with a small team, and saved his other days for personal experimentation and Threes bugs. The next month, Vollmer released Royals, a pay what you want simulation game for OS X and Windows. In Royals, the player controls a peasant who advances towards royal status by collecting resources and followers. In February 2016, Sirvo Studios announced Guildlings, a fantasy adventure game, which was later released in November 2019. Vollmer had founded Sirvo with other indie developers the previous year, which received funding from FunPlus, who also started a $50 million investment fund for the early projects of rising video game developers and artists. In September 2021, Vodeo Games, which was co-founded by Vollmer, released adventure game Beast Breaker. Vollmer felt Guildlings was misaligned with his design sensibilities, which led to Vodeo. In September 2022, Vodeo Games, which employees' Communications Workers of America affiliated union was noted for being in the process of bargaining, closed after "running out of funds".
