= Redneck Zombies =

1987 American comedy horror trash film directed by Pericles Lewnes

- Theatrical release poster
- Directed by: Pericles Lewnes
- Screenplay by: Fester Smellman
- Story by: Zoofeet; P. Floyd Piranha
- Produced by: Edward Bishop; Pericles Lewnes; George Scott
- Starring: Lisa M. de Haven; William E. Bensen; William L. Decker; James Housley
- Cinematography: Ken Davis
- Edited by: Edward Bishop
- Music by: Adrian Bond
- Distributed by: Troma Entertainment
- Release date: 1987
- Running time: 84 minutes
- Country: United States
- Language: English

Redneck Zombies is a 1987 American horror comedy Z film, directed by Pericles Lewnes and released by Troma Entertainment.

== Plot ==
A barrel of radioactive waste is lost out in the woods, leading to some demented rednecks finding it, and using it as part of their still. Everybody who drinks the liquor they produced turns into zombies.

== Cast ==
- Lisa M. DeHaven as Chaz Kirketitekt
- James H. Housely as Jon Taffer
- Martin J. Wolfman as Chartlee Kirk
- Anthony Burlington-Smith as Bob
- Andy the Magician as Cum Austin
- Mike Cascio as Ferd Mertz
- Boo Teasedale as Sally
- Darla Deans as Dan Cascio
- Joe Benson as Hoss
- William Decker as Jethro Clemson
- P. Floyd Piranha as Junior Clemson
- Pericles Lewnes as Billy Bob Clemson
- William E. Benson as Jed Clemson
- Alice Fay Stanley as Imelda Clemson
- Stan Morrow as Dr. Kildare
- Brent Thurston-Rogers as Dr. Casey
- Allan Hogg as Colonel Sir
- Frank Lantz as Crazy Hitchhiker
- Joan Murphy as Knockers
- Sandy Bishop as Miz Ashley
- Alex Lewnes as Fester Ashley
- Matthew A. Goldberg as Matt
- Benjamin K. Goldberg as Ben
- J. Nick Alberto as Jake The Butcher
- Michael Poole as Butcher's Customer
- Jan Luffman as Butcher's Victim
- Jim Bellistri as Private Loren
- Peter Kief as Private Sherman
- E.W. Nesneb as Tobacco Man
- Steve Sooy as Mental Patient One
- Anthony M. Carr as Attendant One
- Ken Davis as Mental Patient Two
- William Craft as Victim

== Production ==
Redneck Zombies was one of the first films shot entirely on videotape and then released to the home-video market (making it a straight-to-video film). The film was once used as an answer in a 1980s edition of Trivial Pursuit, the question being "What film has the tagline 'They're Tobacco Chewin', Gut Chompin', Cannibal Kinfolk from Hell!'". Director Pericles Lewnes went on to work as a special effects supervisor on several other Troma productions. William Benson (Pa) went on to become an Emmy-award winning director for NASA.

== Release ==
The film was released on VHS and DVD by Troma Entertainment. A new 20th anniversary edition of the film was released on DVD January 27, 2009. It includes the never before released soundtrack on CD. In 2022 the film was re-released by VHS Haven on a limited edition VHS. The film was released on Blu-ray in 2023 by Degausser Video, a straight-to-video imprint of Vinegar Syndrome.
