= Edge (magazine) =

UK video game magazine

- One of covers of Issue 400 (Sept 2024)
- Editor: Tony Mott
- Deputy editor: Jon Bailes
- Art director: Warren Brown
- Operations editor: Miriam McDonald
- Categories: Computer and video games
- Frequency: Monthly
- Circulation: Unavailable from 2015; 18,082 (Jan – Dec 2014); 20,485 (Jan – Dec 2013); 25,571 (Jan – Dec 2012)
- Publisher: Future Publishing
- First issue: October 1993; 33 years ago
- Company: Future plc
- Country: United Kingdom
- Based in: Bath, England
- Language: English
- Website: gamesradar.com/uk/edge/
- ISSN: 1350-1593

Edge is a multi-format video game magazine published by Future plc. It is a UK-based magazine and publishes 13 issues annually. The magazine was launched by Steve Jarratt in 1993. It has also released foreign editions in Australia, Brazil, France, Germany, Italy, and Spain.

== History ==
The magazine was launched in October 1993 by Steve Jarratt, a long-time video games journalist who has launched several other magazines for Future.

The artwork for the cover of the magazine's 100th issue was specially provided by Shigeru Miyamoto. The 200th issue was released in March 2009 with 200 different covers, each commemorating a single game; 199 variants were in general circulation, and one was exclusive to subscribers. Only 200 magazines were printed with each cover, sufficient to more than satisfy Edge's circulation of 28,898.

In October 2003, the then-editor of Edge, João Diniz-Sanches, left the magazine along with deputy editor David McCarthy and other staff writers. After the walkout, the editorship of Edge passed back to Tony Mott, who had been editor prior to Diniz-Sanches. The only team member to remain was Margaret Robertson, who in 2006 replaced Mott as editor. In May 2007, Robertson stepped down as editor and was replaced by Tony Mott, taking over as editor for the third time. Alex Wiltshire was the magazine's editor from May 2012 to March 2013, followed by Nathan Brown. Jen Simpkins took over the editor's role from Nathan Brown in April 2020.

Between 1995 and 2002, some of the content from the UK edition of Edge was published in the United States as Next Generation. In 2007, Future's US subsidiary, Future US began re-publishing selected recent Edge features on the Next Generation website; the Edge website and blog were subsequently incorporated into the NextGen site. In July 2008, the whole site was rebranded under the Edge title, as that was the senior of the two brands. In May 2014 it was reported that Future intended to close the websites of Edge, Computer and Video Games and their other videogame publications; in December 2014, it was confirmed that the C&VG website would close and its content would instead be published at GamesRadar, and in January 2015, it was announced that the same would happen to the Edge website. Between 2015 and 2018, Edge articles were occasionally republished on Kotaku UK.

Edge has been redesigned three times since the magazine launched. The first redesign occurred in 1999; the second in 2004; and the third in 2011. The first redesign altered the magazine's dimensions to be wider than the original shape. The latest design changes the magazine's physical dimensions for the second time, and introduces a higher quality of paper stock than was previously used.

== Features ==
Each issue includes a "Making-of" article on a particular game, usually including an interview with one of the original developers. Issue 143 introduced the "Time Extend" series of retrospective articles. Like the "making-of" series, each focuses on a single game and, with the benefit of hindsight, gives an in-depth examination of its most interesting or innovative attributes.

"Codeshop" examines more technical subjects such as 3D modelling programs or physics middleware, while "Studio Profile" and "University Profile" are single-page summaries ("like Top Trumps, but for game dev") of particular developers or publishers, and game-related courses at higher education institutions.

Although an overall list of contributors is printed in each issue's indicia, the magazine typically has not used bylines to credit individual writers to specific reviews and articles, instead only referring to the anonymous Edge as a whole. Since 2014, some contributed features are credited with a byline. The magazine's regular columnists have been consistently credited throughout the magazine's run. The current columnists are James Leach, Clint Hocking and Tadhg Kelly. In addition, several columnists appear toward the beginning of the magazine to talk about the game industry as a whole, rather than focusing on specific game design topics. They are Trigger Happy author Steven Poole, Leigh Alexander, and Brian Howe, whose parody article section "You're Playing It Wrong" began with the new redesign.

Previous columnists have included Paul Rose ("Mr Biffo", the founder of Digitiser), Toshihiro Nagoshi of Sega's Amusement Vision, author Tim Guest (whose column on MMOs preceded the publication of his book Second Lives), N'Gai Croal, and game developer Jeff Minter. In addition, numerous columns were published anonymously under the pseudonym "RedEye", and several Japanese writers contributed to a regular feature called "Something About Japan".

James Hutchinson's comic strip Crashlander was featured in Edge between issues 143 and 193.

== Scoring ==
Edge scores games on a ten-point scale, from a minimum of 1 to a maximum of 10, with five as ostensibly the average rating. For much of the magazine's run, the magazine's review policy stated that the scores broadly correspond to one of the following "sentiments":

1. disastrous
2. appalling
3. severely flawed
4. disappointing
5. average
6. competent
7. distinguished
8. excellent
9. astounding
10. revolutionary

However, with issue 143 the scoring system was changed to a simple list of "10 = ten, 9 = nine..." and so on, a tongue-in-cheek reference to people who read too much into review scores. It was almost three years before Edge gave a game a rating of ten out of ten, and to date the score has been given to twenty-eight games:

List of games with a top 10/10 score
Title	Platforms	Issue	Year
Super Mario 64	Nintendo 64	E035	1996
Gran Turismo	PlayStation	E055	1998
The Legend of Zelda: Ocarina of Time	Nintendo 64	E066	1998
Halo: Combat Evolved	Xbox	E105	2001
Half-Life 2	Windows	E143	2004
Halo 3	Xbox 360	E181	2007
The Orange Box	Windows, Xbox 360	E182	2007
Super Mario Galaxy	Wii	E183	2007
Grand Theft Auto IV	PlayStation 3, Xbox 360	E189	2008
LittleBigPlanet	PlayStation 3	E195	2008
Bayonetta	Xbox 360	E209	2009
Super Mario Galaxy 2	Wii	E215	2010
Rock Band 3	PlayStation 3, Xbox 360	E222	2010
The Legend of Zelda: Skyward Sword	Wii	E234	2011
The Last of Us	PlayStation 3	E255	2013
Grand Theft Auto V	PlayStation 3, Xbox 360	E259	2013
Bayonetta 2	Wii U	E272	2014
Bloodborne	PlayStation 4	E279	2015
The Legend of Zelda: Breath of the Wild	Nintendo Switch, Wii U	E304	2017
Super Mario Odyssey	Nintendo Switch	E312	2017
Red Dead Redemption 2	PlayStation 4, Xbox One	E326	2018
Dreams	PlayStation 4	E344	2020
Elden Ring	PlayStation 4, PlayStation 5, Windows, Xbox One, Xbox Series X/S	E370	2022
Immortality	Android, iOS, Windows, Xbox Series X/S, PlayStation 5	E375	2022
The Legend of Zelda: Tears of the Kingdom	Nintendo Switch	E385	2023
Baldur's Gate 3	Windows, PlayStation 5	E389	2023
Astro Bot	PlayStation 5	E403	2024
Clair Obscur: Expedition 33	PlayStation 5, Windows, Xbox Series X/S	E411	2025
Grand Theft Auto VI	PlayStation 5 Xbox Series X/S		2026

Series with multiple perfect scores
Rank	Series	Number of 10/10 scores	Developer(s)	Timescale
1	Super Mario	4	Nintendo EAD/EPD	1996–2017
1	The Legend of Zelda	4	Nintendo EAD/EPD	1998–2023
2	Bayonetta	2	PlatinumGames	2009–2014
2	Grand Theft Auto	2	Rockstar North	2008–2013
2	Half-Life (inc. The Orange Box)	2	Valve	2004–2007
2	Halo	2	Bungie	2001–2007

In contrast, only two titles have received a one-out-of-ten rating, Kabuki Warriors and FlatOut 3: Chaos & Destruction.

=== Retrospective awards ===
In a December 2002 retro gaming special, Edge retrospectively awarded ten-out-of-ten ratings to two titles released before the magazine's launch:

- Elite (originally released in 1984)
- Exile (originally released in 1988)

Edge also awarded a 10/10 score in one of the regular retrospective reviews in the magazine's normal run:

- Super Mario Bros. (originally released in 1985)

In Edge's 10th anniversary issue in 2003, GoldenEye 007 (1997) was included as one of the magazine's top ten shooters, along with a note that it was perhaps "the only other game" that should have received a ten out of ten rating. The game had originally been awarded a nine out of ten, with the magazine later stating that "a ten was considered, but eventually rejected".

Resident Evil 4, which came second in Edge Presents The 100 Best Videogames, originally obtained a nine, but according to the 100 Best Videogames issue, it came "as near as dammit to the sixth (at the time) Edge ten".

The 20th anniversary issue (E258) published in August 2013 carried a feature called "The Ten Amendments", in which the following seven games' scores were retrospectively adjusted to ten-out-of-ten. A rationale was provided for each.

- GoldenEye 007 (Nintendo 64)
- Advance Wars (Game Boy Advance)
- Resident Evil 4 (GameCube)
- Drop7 (iOS, Android)
- Red Dead Redemption (Xbox 360, PlayStation 3)
- Super Street Fighter IV (Xbox 360, PlayStation 3, Arcade)
- Dark Souls (PlayStation 3, Xbox 360, Windows)

== Special issues ==
A number of Edge special editions were published in the UK. These included:

"1996 essential hardware guide" (1996)

Special edition issue focussing on PS1, Saturn, Ultra 64, PC CD-ROM, 3DO, M2, Atari Jaguar, Amiga, Virtual Boy, Mega Drive, Super Nintendo. This was the first special edition produced, the front and spine displaying Premiere Issue.

"Essential hardware guide 2000" (2000)

Special edition featuring the top ten formats ever, Sir Clive revisits the ZX Spectrum and sections on Xbox, PSOne, PS2, Dreamcast, Gamecube, GScube, Game Boy Color, PC, Game Boy Advance, Wonderswan Color, Ericsson R380s, Palm IIIc and GP32.

"The 100 most significant reviews from the first 100 issues" (2001)

A collection of reprints of notable reviews from the magazine's history, along with retrospective commentary on each game. In addition to reviews of popular titles (including the three "ten out of ten" scores that had been awarded during that period), it also included Edge's comments on notable hyped disappointments such as Rise of the Robots and Daikatana. The issue also included an index of the content of those 100 issues of the magazine.

"Retro: The guide to classic videogame playing and collecting" (2002)

This retrogaming-themed special issue applied the format of the standard edition of Edge to classic video games. This was the most fully formed of the Edge specials, being an edition that only featured new material.

"Retro: 'The making of...' special" (2002)

The second edition in the Retro series was a collection of "Making of" features, most of which had run previously in the main magazine. These features usually contained interviews with the makers of classic video games talking about the process involved in their title's creation.

"Edge presents Equip: PlayStation 2 edition"

"Edge presents Equip: GameCube edition"

"Edge presents Equip: PC edition"

"Edge presents Equip: Xbox edition"

Each Equip issue discussed the state of a particular games platform, looking back on significant releases with the benefit of hindsight and outlining future developments. For example, the GameCube issue featured lengthy retrospectives on The Legend of Zelda: The Wind Waker and Animal Crossing, plus a feature on upcoming titles that would use the GameCube – Game Boy Advance link cable.

'Specials issue ten: "Retro: The Collector's Series" This final edition in the Retro series reprinted all of the "Collector's Series" of articles from the main magazine. Each feature focused on a specific video game console of yesteryear and examined its history and the collectors market surrounding its rare or collectable games. Unusually for Edge, the majority of these articles were written by one video games journalist: Simon Parkin, a long-time freelance contributor to the magazine.

"Edge presents FILE Volume 1 - Issues 1-12: The birth of a new generation" (2006)

"Edge presents FILE Volume 2 - Issues 13-24: The new generation shows its strength" (2007)

"Edge presents FILE Volume 3 - Issues 25-36: Videogame culture enters a new era" (2007)

Three "File" editions reprinted selected content originally published between 1993 and 1996 in Edge issues 1–36. Each volume of "File" covered 12 issues.

"Edge presents... The Art Of Videogames" (2007)

This went on sale 26 April 2007 showcasing the visual aspect of gaming.

"Edge presents... The 100 Best Videogames" (2007)

On sale from 3 July 2007. The list was compiled through a combination of suggestions from Edge readers, Edge staff and additional "industry experts". Each game in the list had a retrospective article, a full-page illustration, and a sidebar listing readers' comments. In addition, the volume contained reprints of the magazine's previous "Top 100" lists from 2000 (issue 80) and 2003 (issue 128). The top 10 of Edge Presents The 100 Best Videogames were:
1. The Legend of Zelda: Ocarina of Time
2. Resident Evil 4
3. Super Mario 64
4. Half-Life 2
5. Super Mario World
6. The Legend of Zelda: A Link to the Past
7. Halo: Combat Evolved
8. Final Fantasy XII
9. Tetris
10. Super Metroid

An Edge Special Edition - "the 100 greatest videogames" (2015)

The issue has a similar format to the previous volume in that each game in the list has a retrospective article accompanied by a full-page illustration (often a piece of concept art from the game). The list was composed solely by Edge staff; there are no sidebars with readers' comments. The "Top 100" lists contained in the 2007 volume were not reprinted.
The criteria Edge used when compiling the list were simple: games from any platform were eligible, series featuring straight-up sequels could only include a single entry, and the games in the list "had to stand up today rather than making the cut for reasons of nostalgia or historic significance."
The top 10 of the 100 greatest videogames were:
1. Dark Souls
2. Grand Theft Auto V
3. The Last of Us
4. Bloodborne
5. Half-Life 2
6. Tetris
7. Super Mario Galaxy 2
8. The Legend of Zelda: Ocarina of Time
9. Resident Evil 4
10. Minecraft

An Edge Special Edition - "the 100 greatest videogames" (2017)

1. The Legend of Zelda: Breath of the Wild
2. Dark Souls (video game)
3. Grand Theft Auto V
4. The Last of Us
5. Bloodborne
6. Half-Life 2
7. Tetris
8. Super Mario Galaxy 2
9. The Legend of Zelda: Ocarina of Time
10. Resident Evil 4

An Edge Special Edition - "the 30th anniversary special edition" - 100 greatest games of Edge's lifetime (2023)

1. The Legend of Zelda: Breath of the Wild
2. Dark Souls (video game)
3. Super Mario 64
4. The Legend of Zelda: Ocarina of Time
5. Resident Evil 4
6. Halo: Combat Evolved
7. Half-Life 2
8. Portal (video game)
9. Elden Ring
10. Doom (1993 video game)

== Foreign editions ==
=== Australia ===
An Australian edition was briefly published in early 2004, for less than six months. The Australian edition consisted mostly of content from the UK edition, along with news on the local games industry.

=== Brazil ===
The Brazilian edition was launched in Brazil in May 2009. It includes articles translated from the UK magazine alongside original local content. The magazine was cancelled in November 2010, with 18 issues.

=== France ===
A translated selection of articles are published with the French magazine Joypad. In 2017, La Financière de Loisirs licensed the title for France, starting with a 200 pages special issue about popular games that changed the gaming industry, as well AAA as indies.

=== Germany ===
In November 2005, a German translation was launched by the publishing house Computec Media AG. The German edition was thinner than the English original, the covers were slightly changed and the ratings raised. In January 2007 it was changed to a bi-monthly schedule and in July 2007 it was finally shut down.

=== Italian ===
In October 2004, an Italian localised edition was launched under the name Videogiochi and published by Future Italy. In December 2006, Future Italy was sold to Sprea Editori which renamed it Game Pro in May 2007. Last issue: September 2009.

=== Spanish ===
A localised edition of Edge was launched in Spain on 15 April 2006 by publisher Globus, which shares some staff from the On/Off editorial, a Globus magazine about DVD video and consumer technology, not in any way related to video games. It lacks some articles contained in the UK edition, such as the Virtua Fighter 5 story which was omitted from the corresponding Spanish edition.

At the end of May 2009, a post in the official Edge Spanish forums made by the main administrator, stated that Globus was about to close its video game division, which meant the closure of the Spanish edition of Edge and NGamer.

In October 2017, a new official Edge Spanish edition is released. A new number comes every two months.
