= Critical Path Project =

Video archive of video game developer interviews

- Website type: Interview Archive
- Available in: English
- Headquarters: Los Angeles, California, U.S.
- Owner: Artifact
- Creator: David Grabias
- Website: www.criticalpathproject.com
- Launched: July 23, 2012; 14 years ago
- Current status: Inactive

The Critical Path Project (stylized CRITICAL///PATH) was a video archive of interviews with video game designers and developers.

Launched on July 23, 2012, Critical Path contained over 1,000 videos of interviews with over 100 developers, conducted between 2010 and 2016. According to director David Grabias, the project's goals include:

- To provide a documentary-based venue for critical discussion about the art of making video games.
- To provide developers with a place where they can come for inspiration.
- To provide players with insight into their game experience.
- To make gamers aware of the great minds behind the great games.
- To document the current state of game development for future generations.

Topics covered in the interviews include violence in games, methods of storytelling, game mechanics, player interaction, psychology behind playing games, commercialism in the industry, and the future of video games, among others.

All clips on the site were available for free viewing online, and there were plans to release a full-length documentary in the future. According to its copyright notice, the site shut down in 2016, so the latter never happened. As of 2026, all the videos from the now inactive website are available on the Critical Path YouTube channel.

== Interview Subjects ==
The site currently features video clips with interviews from the following notable developers, among others:

- Ernest Adams
- Brian Allgeier
- Stig Asmussen
- Chris Avellone
- Daniel Benmergui
- Cliff Bleszinski
- Ian Bogost
- Nolan Bushnell
- David Cage
- John Carmack
- Jenova Chen and Kellee Santiago
- Brendon Chung
- Michael Condrey
- N'Gai Croal
- Don Daglow
- Patrice Désilets
- Denis Dyack
- Noah Falstein
- Josef Fares
- Tracy Fullerton
- Toby Gard
- Richard Garriott
- Steve Gaynor
- Ron Gilbert
- Auriea Harvey
- Trip Hawkins
- Chris Hecker
- David Helgason
- Richard Hilleman
- Clint Hocking
- Todd Howard
- Rod Humble
- Robin Hunicke
- Kenji Inafune
- Toru Iwatani
- Marcin Iwinski
- Daniel James
- David Jones
- Hideo Kojima
- Raph Koster
- Frank Lantz
- Ken Levine
- Laralyn McWilliams
- Jordan Mechner
- Sid Meier
- Peter Molyneux
- Ray Muzyka and Greg Zeschuk
- Frank O'Connor
- Yoshinori Ono
- Rob Pardo
- Randy Pitchford
- Rhianna Pratchett
- Zoë Quinn
- Amir Rao
- Siobhan Reddy
- Warren Robinett
- Jason Rohrer
- Tim Schafer
- Jesse Schell
- Glen Schofield
- Harvey Smith
- Warren Spector
- Joseph Staten
- Davey Wreden
- Will Wright
- Brianna Wu
- Vince Zampella
- Eric Zimmerman

== Discussion ==
A few quotes from the site have raised discussions between critics and fans alike. For example, Metal Gear Solid Director Hideo Kojima (famous for his cinematic narrative scenes) mentions that he's "not trying to tell a story." Sid Meier says he's "failed as a designer" when players use cheats, causing some stir with gamers when they discovered an all-powerful Sid Meier character in the latest Firaxis release, X-COM: Enemy Unknown.

The archive presents a variety of differing opinions from developers. For example, Cliff Bleszinski speaks about creating empowerment fantasies for players, while Warren Spector condemns the practice. Sid Meier says that "micromanagement is not fun" and other developers, like Fable's Peter Molyneux, Ultima's Richard Garriott, and others attempt to create games that give the player as much freedom and decision-making as possible.
