= Beast Breaker =

2021 video game

- Developer: Vodeo Games
- Directors: Asher Vollmer; Christopher Floyd
- Engine: Unity
- Platforms: Microsoft Windows; MacOS; Nintendo Switch
- Release: September 23, 2021
- Genre: Role-playing
- Mode: Single-player

Beast Breaker is a turn-based role-playing video game by Vodeo Games. It was released on September 23, 2021, for Microsoft Windows, MacOS, and Nintendo Switch.

== Gameplay ==
The player slays mosaic beasts in turn-based pinball-style encounters as mouse Skipper.

== Development ==
The game was developed by Vodeo Games, a studio founded by Asher Vollmer. It was announced on April 6, 2021.

== Reception ==
Eurogamer recommended it for being deep and approachable. Kotaku said it encourages players to "take [their] time, relax". Mitch Vogel of Nintendo Life lauded the game as "the epitome of a hidden gem", praising its gameplay, in-depth combat system, and visuals.
