= Threes =

Threes!
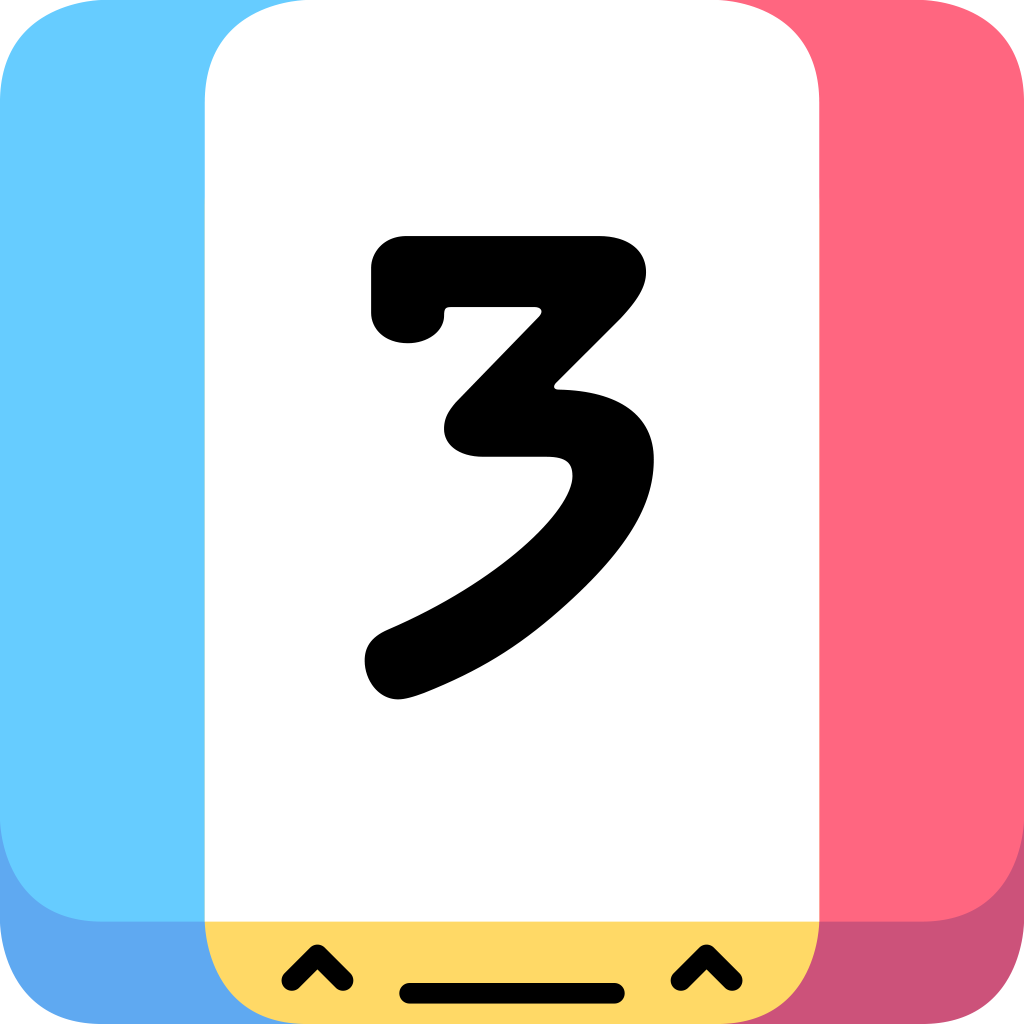
- App icon
- Developer: Sirvo
- Publisher: Sirvo
- Designer: Asher Vollmer
- Artist: Greg Wohlwend
- Composer: Jimmy Hinson
- Engine: Unity
- Platforms: iOS, Android, Xbox One, Windows Phone, web browser, Windows
- Release: February 6, 2014: iOS; February 6, 2014; Android; March 12, 2014; Xbox One; December 5, 2014; Windows Phone; April 27, 2015; Browser; December 18, 2015; Windows; February 6th, 2024
- Genre: Puzzle
- Mode: Single-player

Threes (stylized as Threes!) is a 2014 puzzle video game by Sirvo, an independent development team consisting of game designer Asher Vollmer, illustrator Greg Wohlwend, and composer Jimmy Hinson. The game was released on February 6, 2014, for iOS devices and later ported to Android, Xbox One, Windows Phone, and Windows. In Threes, the player slides numbered tiles on a grid to combine addends and multiples of three. The game ends when there are no moves left on the grid and the tiles are counted for a final score.

The basic game was prototyped in a single night, but the team spent over half a year iterating through variations on the idea with visual themes such as sushi and chess. By the end of the game's 14-month development, the team returned to the game's simple principles and numbers theme.

The game received what video game review score aggregator Metacritic described as "universal acclaim", and is regarded as one the best mobile games of all time. Reviewers found the game "charming" and "addictive" and compared it to Drop7, Stickets, and Triple Town. Eurogamer and TouchArcade awarded the game perfect scores, with the latter calling Threes "about as close as it gets to a perfect mobile game". Other developers released similar games and clones within weeks of the game's launch. Apple Inc. named Threes the best iPhone game of 2014.

== Gameplay ==
The official game trailer, depicting standard sliding tile gameplay

The player slides numbered tiles on a four-by-four grid to combine addends and multiples of three. For example, ones and twos merge to become a single "three" tile, two threes merge into "six", and two sixes merge into "12". Swiping the screen up, down, left, or right moves all of the tiles one square (if possible) on the grid in that direction and adds a new tile to the grid in the same direction. The color of the incoming tile is shown onscreen. Players can preview moves by sliding the grid without letting go. Each kind of number tile has its own personality, and new kinds of number tiles are introduced with a screen full of confetti when first unlocked.

Games of Threes typically last several minutes and end when no moves remain on the grid (usually when gridlocked with a single high number tile and many low number tiles). When a game is finished, there is no "game over" screen, but players receive a final score based on the rarity of the tiles (rather than the tile number values). The object of the game is to earn a high score. Outside of the game, players can review their scores and set Game Center challenges.

There are a total of 2 kinds of colored tiles, valued 1 and 2, and 12 kinds of "threes" tiles in the game with values from 3 through 6,144. Color tiles are worth nothing, while the point value of "threes" tiles start at 3 and grows exponentially.

There is also a 13th character that is unlocked when two 6,144 tiles are combined; this character is marked by a triangle rather than the number 12,288. When this character is revealed, the game ends immediately even if the player has moves available, and points are totaled as usual. This feat was achieved and documented by Twitter user Threesporn in 2017 and publicly acknowledged by developer Asher Vollmer.

== Development ==
The game resisted complexity because it was such a small game, it was four by four grid, and numbers, and just the four directions. It always wanted to be simple.

— Game artist Greg Wohlwend to Polygon

Threes was conceived by game designer Asher Vollmer, who worked on the game with artist Greg Wohlwend and composer Jimmy Hinson. The three, as Sirvo LLC, had previously collaborated on the 2012 iOS word game Puzzlejuice. Wohlwend had worked on games including Ridiculous Fishing and Hundreds. Threes development began before Ridiculous Fishing's March 2013 release. Vollmer presented an idea similar to the final product in its simplicity: pair tiles as multiples of three. Vollmer considered Drop7 an inspiration for the game, and played it for two years before making his game. The first Threes prototype was written in a single night. With Wohlwend, the two-man development team spent at least half a year of the game's 14-month development iterating on this main idea.

Some of the iterations included new numberless visual themes and new game mechanics such as a monster who ate tiles and a wall that blocked certain movements. Early Threes designs had no inclination towards minimalism: the pair felt that the game needed to appear more complex so as to interest players. Wohlwend sent Vollmer designs including sushi-themed tiles that paired fish and rice, a chess theme that paired chess pieces, themes about animals, broccoli and cheese soup, military insignia, hydrogen atoms, and textile patterns. Their test audiences were confused by the close to two dozen themes tested in total. Vollmer commented that these ideas made the game feel "unwieldy and unnatural" and that he always preferred the game when the changes were reverted. They received a "wake-up call" from fellow game designer Zach Gage, who encouraged them to return from their foray into complexity. The final game returned to its original theme of numbers. Speaking in retrospect, Wohlwend said the game "always wanted to be simple". He noted that players "think math" upon seeing the game's numbers, though the game is more about "spatial relationships" and just happens to have a "number theme".

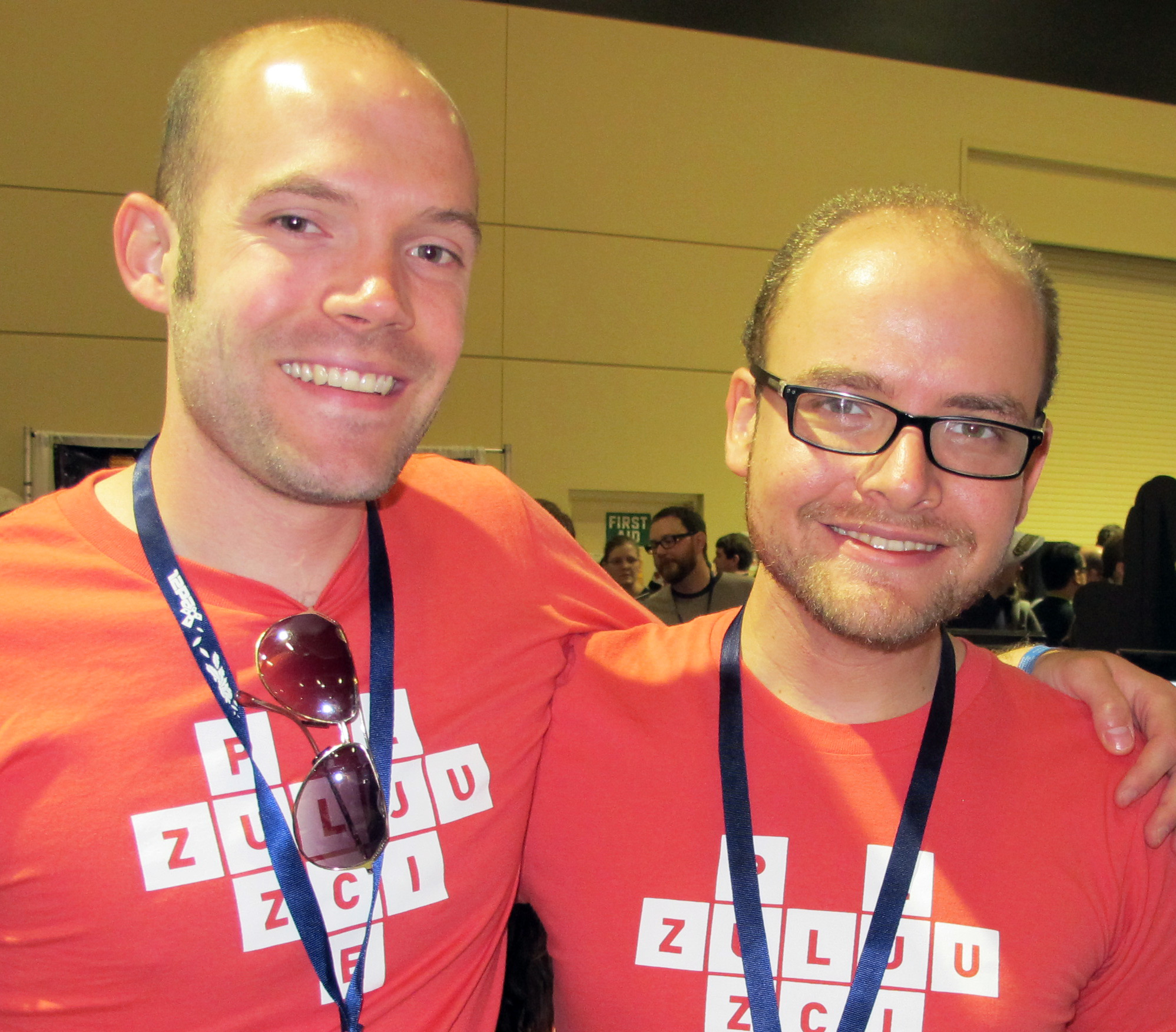
Wohlwend and Vollmer in 2012

When returning to the fundamental and original game concept—pairing tiles as multiples of three—the developers felt their experiments informed their final game development decisions. The theme of individual tile personalities extended to the final version, as tiles have faces and express emotions when paired. For example, the 384 tile has a pirate personality with a large tooth and a pirate eyepatch. Wohlwend has said that the number tiles grow in character with their size. The idea for character faces beneath the cards remained from previous theme iterations, and the character voices were provided by indie game developers. Of the development process, Wohlwend called it "tough and frustrating and sometimes hard to see if it was worth it". Vollmer credited thatgamecompany for teaching him applicable lessons of restraint during his time there.

The game was released by Sirvo for iOS on February 6, 2014, and ported by indie developer Hidden Variable Studios for Android on March 12, 2014. The team chose to release for iOS first due to the small team's difficulty testing across Android platforms. Hidden Variable also developed an Xbox One version, which was originally announced at Microsoft's E3 2014 press conference, and released on December 5, 2014. The release supports the console's "snap mode" (to play in the corner of the screen while the player watches something else) as well as online leaderboards and a "night mode" darker palette option. A free Windows Phone version was released on April 27, 2015, and a free web browser version in December 2015. The browser release does not include advertisements, unlike the free smartphone releases. In a post-release infographic, Sirvo wrote that the average game length was 20 minutes, even though they designed the game's sessions to not last longer than 10 minutes. They also reported that 93 percent of players in China used unlicensed copies of the game.

To celebrate the 10th anniversary, a PC port was released on Steam on February 6th, 2024. In addition to the standard gameplay of the original release, it includes a new song by Big Giant Circles for Night Mode, Steam Deck Verified Support, keyboard controls, cloud save, and achievements.

Threes! prototypes
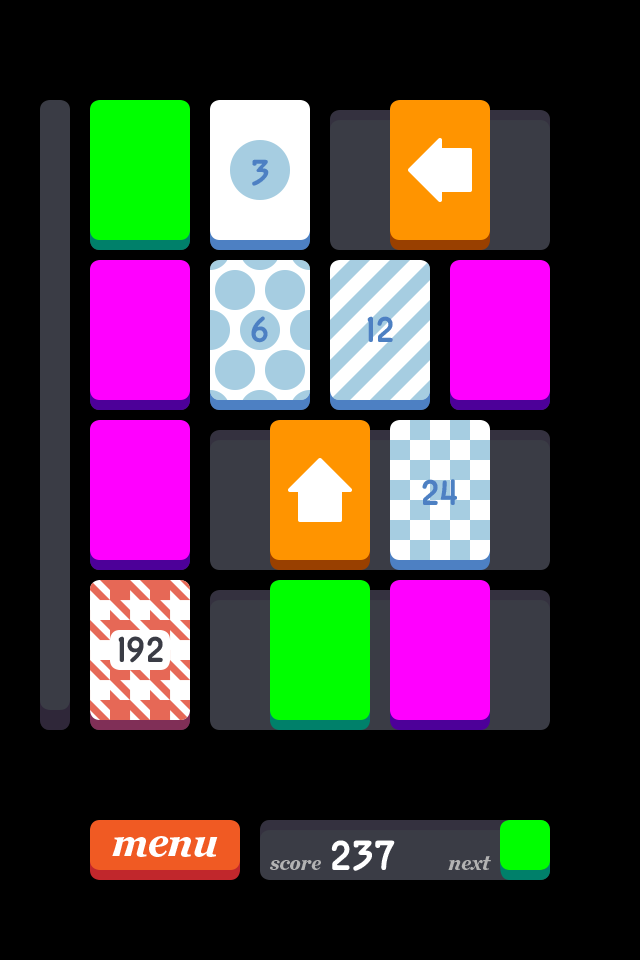
Small numbers, neon colors, and patterned tiles

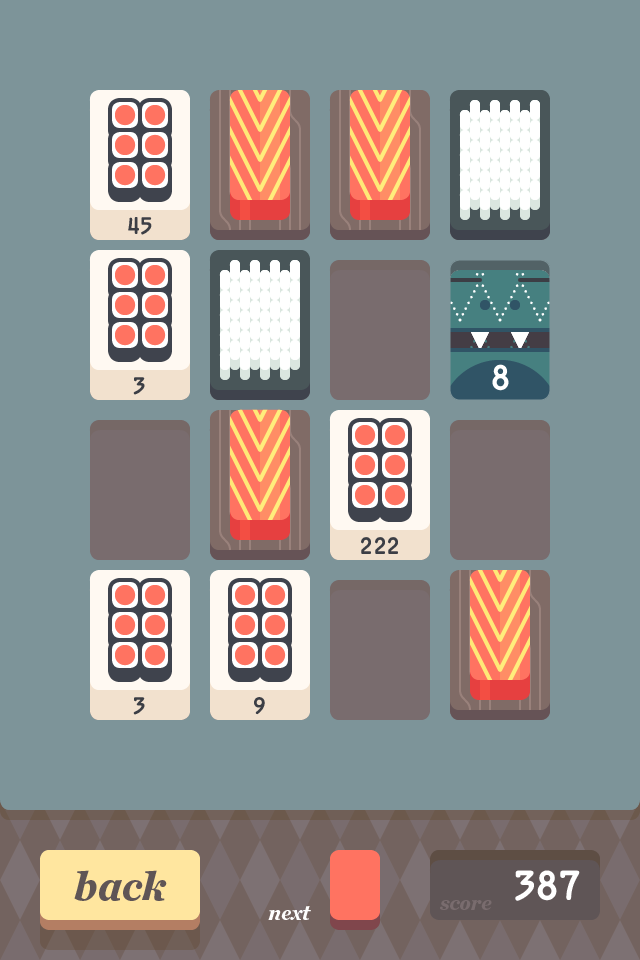
Sushi-themed tiles

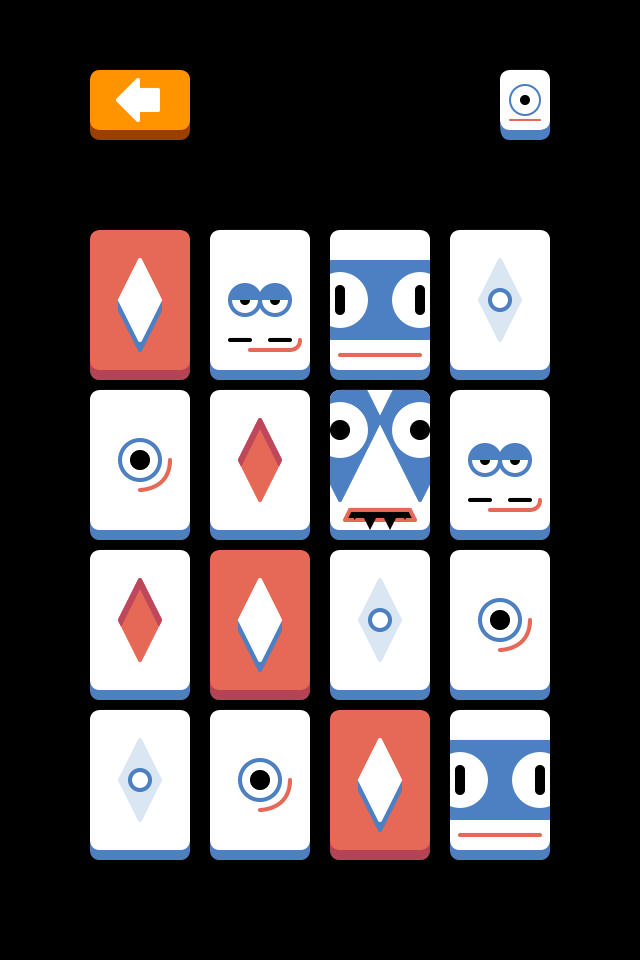
Monster-themed tile personalities

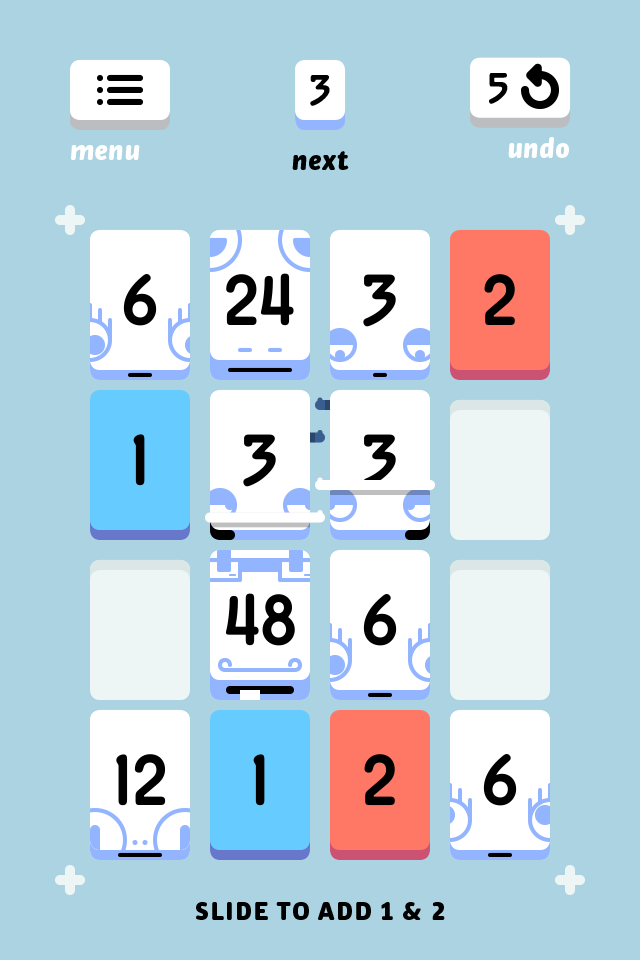
Red, white, and blue tiles with subdued faces

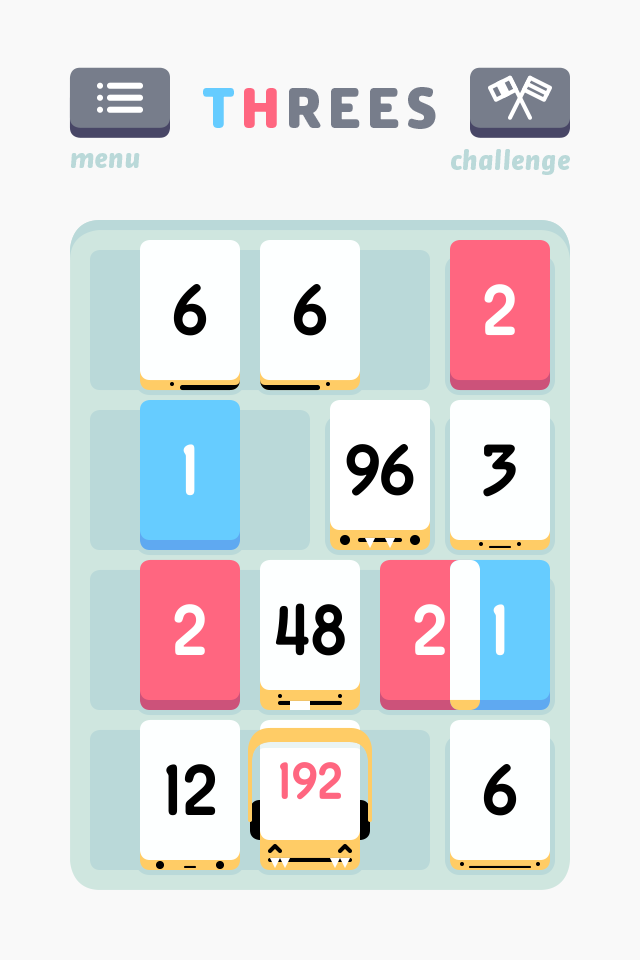
Final version, with tiny faces beneath the tiles

== Reception ==
Reception

Aggregate score
Aggregator	Score
Metacritic	92/100

Review scores
Publication	Score
Edge	8/10
Eurogamer	10/10
Game Informer	9/10
TouchArcade	5/5
Digital Spy	4/5

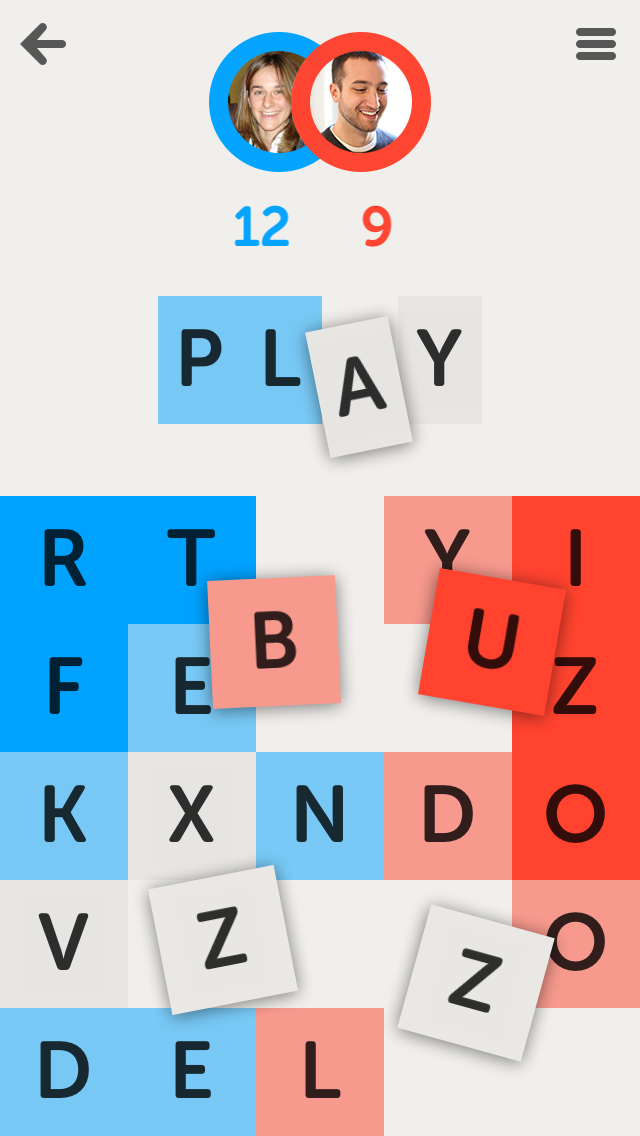
Two critics cited Letterpress as a stylistic predecessor.

The game received what video game review score aggregator Metacritic described as "universal acclaim", with a 92% rating based on 19 reviews. Eurogamer and TouchArcade awarded the game perfect scores, with the latter calling Threes "about as close as it gets to a perfect mobile game". It was an honorable mention in the 2014 Independent Games Festival's Excellence in Design category. The game reached the top of the Apple App Store paid app sales chart shortly after its release. Re/code reported that it "dominated" the chart in the following weeks and became one of the 25 highest grossing apps on the App Store. It later won a 2014 Apple Design Award and was named Apple's best iPhone game of 2014. During the 18th Annual D.I.C.E. Awards, the Academy of Interactive Arts & Sciences nominated Threes for "Mobile Game of the Year" and the "D.I.C.E. Sprite Award". Reviewers found the game "charming" and "addictive". They compared the game with the luck of Drop7, the challenge of Stickets, and the "match-by-combining" mechanics in Triple Town. Reviewers also praised the simplicity of the tutorial and noted how their attention on combining large number tiles contrasted with their need to watch the board's movements as a whole.

Ben Kuchera of Polygon wrote that the game was "a brilliant little puzzler" and commented on the difficulty of designing such an accessible minimalist game. Dan Ryckert of Game Informer noted that the game had all of the qualities of a successful mobile game: accessibility of short game sessions, easy to learn and tough to master gameplay, room to make and try strategies, and gameplay mechanics suited for touchscreens. He added that his progressive play strategy adaptations for higher scores made the game joyful. Ars Technica's Kyle Orland wrote that he expects the game to join Drop7 and Super Hexagon on his phone for the rest of his life and Crypt of the NecroDancer designer Ryan Clark called Threes the best iOS game he had ever played.

Mark Sorrell of Eurogamer compared the game's "profoundly and offensively banal" aesthetic to a "hipster restaurant" with good food but a smug ambiance, citing the soundtrack's "whimsy" and the art style's similarity to iOS game Letterpress. He praised the game's mechanics. TouchArcade compared the game's scaffolding mechanics to the turn-based roguelike Hoplite, and The Verge's Andrew Webster compared the game's addictive mechanics to Sudoku and its style to Letterpress and SpellTower. Nick Statt of CNET thought the game had Tetris's beauty and Dots's visual appeal. He cited the game as an example of "flow" design principles at work, where the game is designed for players to enter a state of focus and self-awareness. Recode's Eric Johnson called the game a descendant of Sudoku, Dots, and Rush Hour. Pocket Gamer's Mark Brown thought the game's randomness kept its gameplay interesting, and MAME creator Nicola Salmoria wrote an artificial intelligence to play the game.

Edge wrote that the game "can feel a little insubstantial" in its lack of gameplay variety, though its "charm and craft" will make players return. They wrote that the soundtrack is cheerful and memorable with an "indie romcom feel". TouchArcade added that the soundtrack "fits the game perfectly" and recommended playing the game with sound activated so as to hear the tiles' personalities. CNET thought the music became repetitive, but that the tile voices were "a little creepy" without the soundtrack. Garrett Martin of Paste wrote that he heard the influence of Jon Brion and alluded to Paul Thomas Anderson's early films. Comparing Threes to Hundreds as the "quirky American cousin" to Hundreds's "European art film", Martin found Threes more whimsical in nature and extended Ian Bogost's statements in The Atlantic about video games as "haute couture ... design objects" to Threes.

== Legacy ==
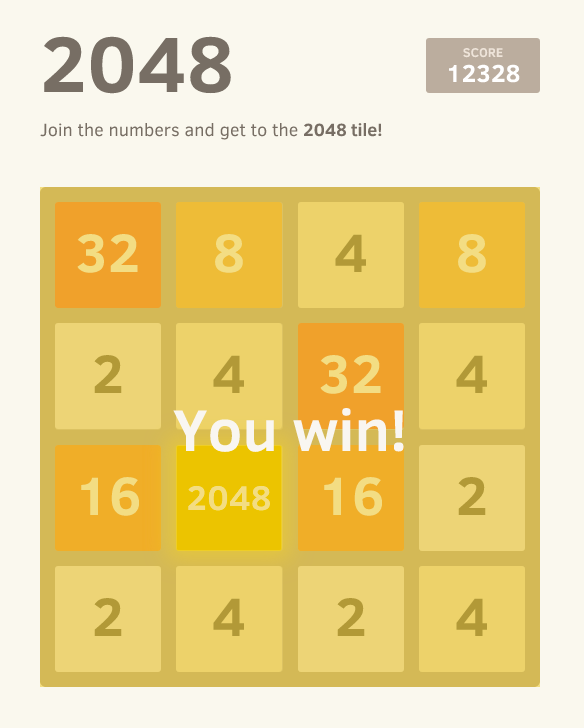
2048 gameplay, showing a finished game

Outside developers released games that closely resembled Threes within weeks of its release, including a browser-based version, (Note: The browser version was authorized by Vollmer and Wohlwend, who felt that it was made "with the right kind of heart" and without interest in profiting off of their work.) an "unofficial sort-of-knockoff" Android app (Fives), and another iPhone game, 1024, which advertised itself as "No need to pay for Threes" and was later ported to a browser version. A March 2014 clone of 1024, the browser game 2048, (Note: The Independent described 2048 as a "clone of a clone". The game's creator cites 1024 as the basis for 2048 and referred to Threes as "conceptually similar".) became popular and spawned "dozens of parodies". Journalists, including those at the Los Angeles Times, did not acknowledge the game's connection to Threes.

The Threes team was "puzzled" by the popularity of these releases, especially those that did not credit their game for the idea. They criticized 2048's game design and compared the game as the Commander Keen to their Super Mario Bros. in a 45,000-word post outlining their full 14-month development process. Gamasutra's Leigh Alexander described the situation as a "unique tragedy". Threes designer Vollmer would try to remove the clones from online stores but ultimately accepted that the game would be copied and resolved that his future games would not share the same fate.

Eurogamer listed Threes as one of the top 10 games of the generation. Tom's Guide listed Threes as one of the top 30 games of the 2010s.
