= GScube =

Hardware tool by Sony

The GScube was a hardware tool released by Sony intended for use in CGI production houses consisting of a custom variant of sixteen PlayStation 2 motherboards running in parallel. The PlayStation 2 (PS2) is a video game console that was manufactured by Sony Computer Entertainment. It was released on March 4, 2000, in Japan followed by North America and Europe later the same year. It was unveiled that same year at SIGGRAPH; the name "GSCube" is short for Graphics Synthesizer Cube. It was used for two projects, Final Fantasy: The Spirits Within and the film incarnation of Resident Evil.

According to some sources, they were all sent back to Sony in Japan and were subsequently dismantled. They were used for prototyping visual rendering in Final Fantasy, The Matrix and Antz, as well as in a flight simulator. Although the GSCube had good rendering capability, they had a major bottleneck in connecting to external computers to transfer content.

== Technical specifications ==
- 16 × Emotion Engine CPUs clocked at 294.912 MHz
- 2 GB of DRDRAM Rambus main memory (16 × 128 MB)
  - (128 MB was a common memory allocation on devkits vs. the 32 MB on shipping units)
- Memory Bus Bandwidth 50.3 GB/s (3.1 GB/s × 16)
- Floating Point Performance 97.5 GFLOPS (6.1 GFLOPS × 16)
- 16 × "Graphics Synthesizer "I-32" Graphics Processors clocked at 147.456 MHz
- 512 MB of eDRAM Video Memory (16 × 32 MB)
  - (The "I-32" Graphics Synthesizer was a custom variant that contained 32 MB of eDRAM instead of the typical 4 MB)
- eDRAM Bandwidth 755 GB/s (47.2 GB/s × 16)
- Pixel Fill Rate 37.7 GB/s (2.36 GB/s × 16)
- Maximum Polygon Drawing Rate 1.2 Gpolygons/s (73.7 Mpolygons/s × 16)
