= R/GA =

Advertising agency based in New York City

R/GA Media Group, Inc.
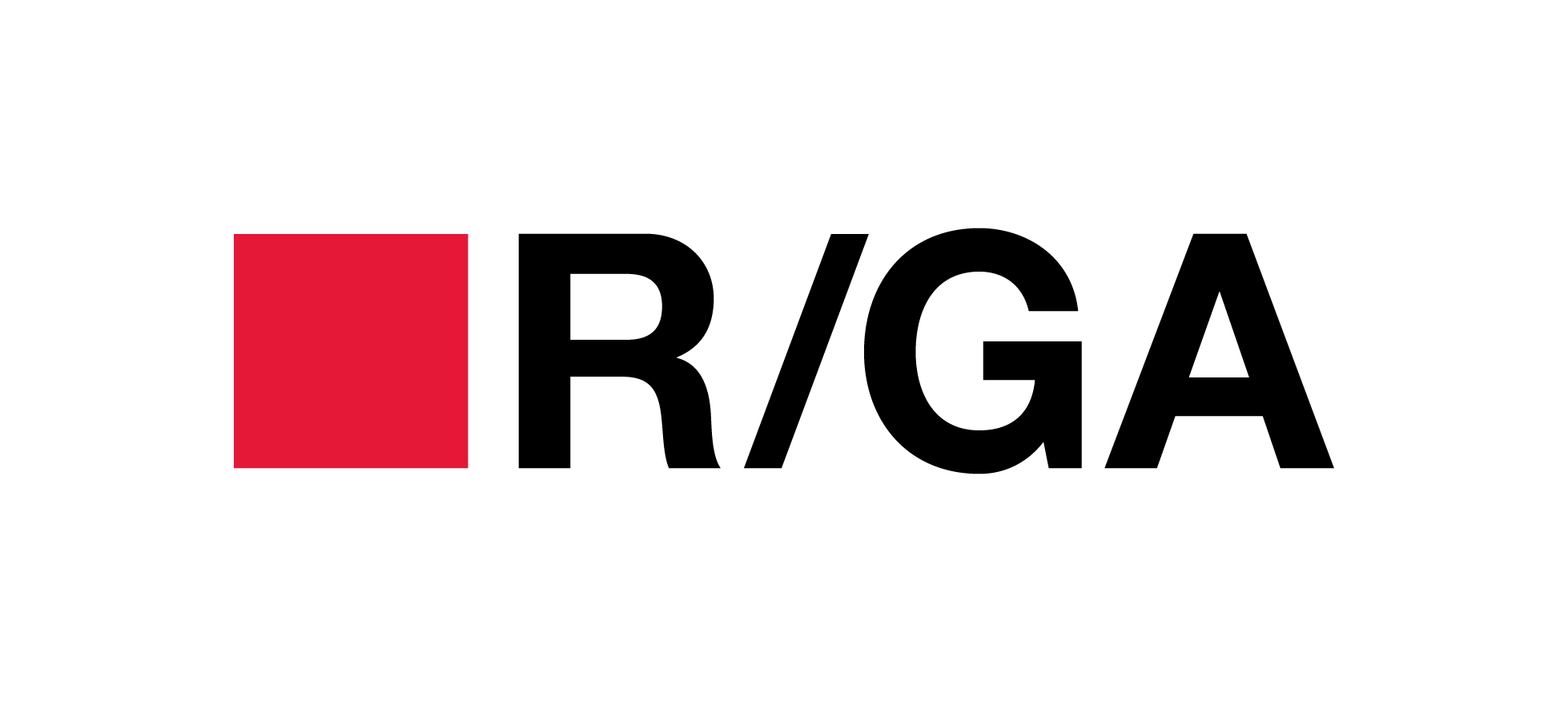
- Logo used since 2019
- Trade name: R/GA
- Type: Subsidiary
- Industry: Innovation; Transformation; Advertising
- Founded: 1977
- Headquarters: New York City, United States
- Key people: Bob Greenberg (Founder + Executive Chairman); Tiffany Rolfe (Global Chair + CCO); Robin Forbes (CEO); Nick Coronges (CTO)
- Number of employees: 2000+
- Website: rga.com

R/GA Media Group, Inc., doing business as R/GA, is an advertising company based in New York City. As a global company, R/GA has teams in ten countries. After 23 years with Interpublic Group, R/GA became an independent agency in 2025 when it spun out of Interpublic Group of Companies with private equity funding.

== History ==
R/GA, formerly R/Greenberg Associates, was founded in 1977, by two brothers, Richard and Robert Greenberg with $15,000 of capital. Richard was the designer, while Robert was the producer and cameraman. It has restructured its business model every nine years due to the CEO's belief in numerology. Over 40 years, the company has evolved from a computer-assisted film-making studio to a digital design and consulting company, as part of a major advertising network.

=== 1977–1985: computer-assisted film making ===
R/GA was founded as a design company that focused on motion graphics, live-action film, and video production. By incorporating computers into the film-making process, R/GA created the first integrated computer-assisted production process. The company became known for creating the opening title sequence for Superman in 1978. R/GA's commercial work also includes trailers, special effects, and promotions for feature films like, Alien, and Ghostbusters.

=== 1986–1994: digital studio ===
R/GA created a digital studio that combined three separate media—print, television commercials, and feature films. During the period R/GA was doing this, its body of work spanned approximately 400 feature films and 4,000 television commercials. In 1986, R/GA won a technical Academy Award, and Richard Greenberg left the company to pursue other interests. In 1993, R/GA Interactive was founded as part of R/GA Digital Studios. Its purpose was to extend R/GA's scope to include interactive content, such as video games.

=== 1995–2004: interactive advertising agency ===
In its third nine-year cycle, R/GA changed into an interactive advertising agency and secured IBM as a client. At the time, IBM was consolidating advertising agencies and selected R/GA to redesign the company's five-million-page website. In 2001, R/GA became the Interactive Agency of Record for Nike.

=== 2004–2011: digital media and products ===
R/GA changed its agency model to account for client's increasing demand for digital media. The agency expanded globally, and built a more diverse offering including mobile, social, digital advertising, and brand development. R/GA developed the Nike+ platform.

=== 2011–2025: digital transformation ===
In 2011, the New York Times reported that R/GAwould begin to offer clients event marketing and data visualization services followed by the additions of consulting and product innovation in 2012. The company also set up a venture studio that develops digital products and services with start-ups; based on various themes from healthcare to retail.. In 2021, R/GA developed Reddit’s five-second Super Bowl advertisement, which gained widespread industry attention for its unconventional format and real-time cultural relevance. In 2022, R/GA won a Grand Prix at the Cannes Lions Festival for the NikeSync digital experience. In the same year, the company was recognized as Webby’s Agency of the year.

== Notable creative work ==
=== Superman (1978) ===
R/GA created the opening title sequence for Superman by visually enhancing each name so it appears to be flying into the screen. The visual imagery and special effects developed for this film launched R/GA (then known as R/Greenberg Associates) as a visual-effects company.

=== Nike+ (2006) ===
R/GA created an online brand platform that gives runners a tool to record, track, and share their running data. In 2007, Nike+ won a number of awards including Titanium and Cyber Grand Prix awards at the Cannes Lions International Advertising Festival. In 2009, Adweek named Nike+ Digital Campaign of the Decade,

=== Beats By Dre (2012-14) ===
R/GA partnered with Beats by Dre to create their music platform and advertising; key campaigns coincided with the 2012 Olympics and 2014 World Cup. The creative work won a number of awards and the brand was sold to Apple Inc. for a reported $3 billion; after the sale, Beats Music became Apple Music.
