= Drop7 =

2009 video game

- Developer: Area/Code Entertainment (later as Zynga New York)
- Publisher: Zynga
- Director: Frank Lantz
- Producers: Demetri Detsaridis, Jacky Tran
- Designers: Frank Lantz, Kevin Cancienne
- Programmers: Kevin Cancienne, Carter Page, Christian Croft, Michael Foster
- Artists: Frank Lantz, Mark Heggen
- Composer: Steve Horelick
- Platforms: iOS, Android
- Release: 2009
- Genre: Puzzle
- Mode: Single-player

Drop7 is a puzzle game developed by Area/Code Entertainment, for Android and iOS.

== Gameplay ==
The game is played with touch controls on a 7x7 square grid. In each round, the player places a disc that falls from the top of the grid. Each disc has a number 1–7, or a blank. Whenever the number of any disc matches the number of contiguous discs in a row or column, that disc disappears and also hits any blank discs it touches. When a blank is hit twice, it turns into a numbered disc. After a number of turns, the round ends and a full row of blank discs emerges from the bottom of the grid. There is no time limit, and discs may be dropped at the player's leisure. The objective is to eliminate discs and score combos for as long as possible until either the grid overflows or the grid is full and it is impossible to place another disc. If the player clears the screen of all discs, then the player is given a 70,000 point bonus.

There are three modes available – "Normal Mode" is the basic way to play. The player will drop a mixture of colored and gray discs, and the levels will come more frequently as the player goes on; "Blitz Mode" starts with the levels coming quickly, but the player won't be given gray discs to drop; "Sequence Mode" is exactly like Normal Mode, except the player (and everyone else in the world) will get the same discs in the same order every time.

== Reception ==
IGN gave the game an overall rating of 8.5/10.

In January 2009, IGN ranked Drop7 #2 on its list of The Top 25 iPhone Games.

In their October 2013 issue, Edge retroactively awarded the game ten out of ten, one of only twenty-three games to achieve the highest score in the magazine's twenty-year history. In 2015, Edge ranked the game 24th on their top 100 greatest video games.
