= Aggro Crab =

Indie video game company

Aggro Crab Games LLC
- Industry: Video games
- Founded: 2019; 7 years ago
- Founders: Nick Kaman; Caelan Pollock
- Headquarters: Seattle, Washington, United States
- Number of employees: 13
- Website: aggrocrab.com

Aggro Crab Games LLC is an American independent video game developer and publisher based in Seattle, Washington, United States. The studio was founded on January 1, 2019, and is commonly known for Going Under (2020), Another Crab's Treasure (2024) and Peak (2025).

== History ==
Aggro Crab was founded by Nick Kaman and Caelan Pollock in 2019. On September 24, 2020, the first game of Aggro Crab, a beat-em-up roguelike named Going Under was released. The project received generally good reviews from critics.

Announced in 2022, Aggro Crab's second game, Another Crab's Treasure was released on April 25, 2024. Developers stated that they wanted to make the game look as little as possible like other games of the Soulslike genre through a more colorful, more humorous approach. The game was received positively by players and critics alike.

For their next game, Aggro Crab decided to revisit the world of Going Under, announcing Going Under 2 in 2025. In June 2025, differences in creative vision caused the new project to lose its funding, resulting in its cancellation. The studio then worked in cooperation with indie-studio Landfall Games to develop a cooperative multiplayer climbing game named Peak. The game was initially developed by two studios in a month-long game jam in Seoul, similar to the development of Landfall's Content Warning the year prior. Peak saw huge success, selling over 100,000 copies in first 24 hours.

On October 2, Aggro Crab announced Crashout Crew, a game described as a "wild co-op adventure". A demo version of the game was released on October 13.

== List of games ==
Year	Title	Platform(s)	Developer(s)	Publisher(s)
2020	Going Under	Windows, Xbox One, PlayStation 4, Nintendo Switch	Aggro Crab	Team17
2021	Subway Midnight	Windows	Bubby Darkstar	Aggro Crab
2024	Another Crab's Treasure	Windows, Xbox Series X/S, PlayStation 5, Nintendo Switch	Aggro Crab	Aggro Crab
2025	Peak	Windows, Xbox Series X/S, PlayStation 5, Nintendo Switch 2	Aggro Crab & Landfall Games	Aggro Crab & Landfall Games
2026	Crashout Crew	Windows, Xbox Series X/S	Aggro Crab	Aggro Crab
