= Crashout Crew =

- Developer: Aggro Crab
- Publisher: Aggro Crab
- Platforms: Windows; Xbox Series X/S
- Release: May 28, 2026
- Modes: Single-player, multiplayer

Crashout Crew is a cooperative video game developed and published by Aggro Crab for Windows on Steam and Xbox Series X/S. In the game, players control forklifts and attempt to manage a shipping warehouse. It was released on May 28, 2026.

== Development ==
The game was first announced in early October 2025. The demo was released on October 13, 2025, as part of Steam Next Fest. The game was released on May 28, 2026.

== Gameplay ==
Up to four players are given the task of delivering a specific number of items into trucks before they drive away. If players get too stressed, then they lose control of their forklift and it drives around erratically. Players get stressed when they hit a wall with their forklift, bump into another player, stand on lava, or get hit by a meteor.

== Reception ==
The game has been widely described as "chaotic" and seen as "multiplayer warehouse mayhem". Writing for TheGamer, Chris Hayner wrote that the game appeared similar to R.E.P.O., a cooperative multiplayer game that released in early 2025.
