= Going Under (video game) =

2020 video game

- Developer: Aggro Crab
- Publisher: Team17
- Designers: Caelan Pollock, Joanna Lin, Sam Strick
- Programmers: Caelan Pollock, Sam Strick
- Artists: Nick Kaman, Joanna Lin, Luiz Mello
- Writer: Caelan Pollock
- Composer: Felix Peaslee
- Engine: Unity
- Platforms: Microsoft Windows, Nintendo Switch, PlayStation 4, Xbox One
- Release: September 24, 2020
- Genres: Roguelike, action role-playing
- Mode: Single-player

Going Under is a 2020 roguelike video game developed by Aggro Crab and published by Team17. The game follows an unpaid intern as she travels beneath her workplace to explore the ruins of failed startups. Going Under was released for the PlayStation 4, Xbox One, Nintendo Switch and Microsoft Windows on September 24, 2020.

== Plot ==
Jacqueline "Jackie" Fiasco, a resident of Neo-Cascadia, joins Fizzle Beverages, a company recently acquired by Cubicle, a tech giant. She meets with her boss, Marv, to discuss her job. While explaining the internship to her, Marv spots a monster wandering around the office and tells Jackie to defeat it. After Jackie kills the monster, Marv reveals that the Fizzle office is built on top of failed startups filled with monsters. Jackie is tasked with going into three failed companies in order clear out monsters and to find relics that the founders of the startups hold.

After completing three dungeons, a secret portal is unlocked. Jackie travels down through floors, fighting monsters from previously completed dungeons. Once she reaches the bottom, she finds Marv trying to use the relics. Marv tells Jackie that he was trying to harness the relics' power to increase productivity. He says Fizzle's new products have been unsuccessful, and that Cubicle's management plan to shutter the company. Jackie defeats Marv, but Marv tells her that she has doomed the company. Once Jackie returns to the office, an earthquake tears the workplace apart and Jackie falls down. She wakes up in the ruins of the Fizzle headquarters and learns from her coworkers that Fizzle has been shut down. Her coworkers have begun to turn into aquatic-themed monsters similarly to the other failed startups turning into monsters, and Jackie is warned that if she remains in Fizzle she will begin to transform too. Ray, the founder of Fizzle, tells Jackie the only way to escape is to find shares from the original founders of the three companies to use an elevator and to convince Cubicle to reinstate Fizzle.

Once Jackie defeats all the bosses, she learns the final share is missing. She confronts Ray about this, who tells her that he has been self-concerned and hopes that Jackie can find a better boss in the future. Jackie uses the shares and fights her way up to the top floor, allying with the enemies she faced in order to take on Cubicle. Once she reaches the board room, she finds the chairs are all empty besides for Avie, the office assistant. Avie tells her that she tried to find what humans truly wanted in order to sell products, but she could not find it. The next step in this process would be to see everyone's deepest desires through scanning their souls. However, the soul had a protective shield around it, that prevented access. So Avie harvested the brain matter of the corporate board in order to devise a solution, which was to use the power of the relics in order to break the seal. Avie then tells Jackie that she will ascend into the cloud in order to upload the seal break. Jackie attacks Avie, who summons a drone army to attack Jackie. Jackie's coworkers appear to help her, and Kara, the programmer, gives Jackie an app that allows her to fight Avie in the cloud. After defeating Avie, Jackie returns to the office and talks with her coworkers about what comes next in their careers. Jackie expresses optimism and feels that they can all find a good workplace together.

== Gameplay ==
The player can electrocute enemies by attacking them with electronics like laptops and monitors.

The player takes the role of Jackie, an intern for Fizzle, who tries to clear dungeons in order to find relics held by failed startups. Jackie can get help from the shopkeepers found in each dungeon. They can also find the Hauntrepreneur, who will give skills and items in exchange for a "curse" being applied for the next few rooms. The game features three "startups" to explore: Joblin, Winkydink, and Styxcoin.

Each of the dungeons is randomly generated, with rooms and enemies in different places every time. The player can find items around each room to use as weapons. Each weapon has a light attack and a heavy attack, and can be thrown. After a certain number of hits, the weapon will break. The player can hold three weapons in their storage at once, and can switch between them at will. The player can find skills throughout the level, such as being able to do double damage at the beginning of a run. If the player levels up a skill, they can "pin" it, making the player have it by default. The player can additionally find apps that give Jackie a one use ability, like a camera app that stuns enemies with a flash. The player receives cash from defeating enemies, which can be spent at shops that appear on each floor. The shops contain health items, weapons and new skills to acquire. At the end of each floor is a boss room where the player has to fight through enemies in order to move down to the next floor. On the fourth floor of the dungeon is a boss the player has to fight in order to obtain the relic. The player is sent back to the hub if their health reaches zero.

Once at the office, the player can talk their coworkers to hear dialogue, and to receive tasks that they can complete. These can range from defeating certain enemies to not using an ability on a floor. If the player finishes a task for a coworker, they can level up the character's mentorship, giving Jackie access to new bonuses and abilities to be used in the dungeons.

== Development ==
Going Under received multiple post launch updates, including one that added jiggle physics to various weapons to the game. The Working from Home update included new weapons, outfits, locations and a hard mode with remixed dungeons. An additional dungeon was intended for a future update, but it was cancelled due to the poor sales of the base game. A physical release for Nintendo Switch and PlayStation 4 was produced by Limited Run Games.

== Reception ==
Reception

Aggregate score
Aggregator	Score
Metacritic	NS: 81/100; PC: 78/100; PS4: 80/100; XONE: 73/100

Review scores
Publication	Score
Edge	7/10
Nintendo Life	7/10
Nintendo World Report	9/10
PlayStation Official Magazine – UK	8/10

In a positive review for Nintendo World Report, Jordan Rudek praised the workplace setting of the title, writing that "The story and world of Going Under provide a compelling backdrop for what is essentially a roguelite dungeon-crawler." Rudek also liked the accessibility settings offered to the player, "A variety of accessibility options, such as increased health and longer invincibility after getting hit, can help less experienced applicants, too."

Nintendo Life's Henry Stockdale enjoyed the game's satire of corporate culture, "At the heart of any satire is a political message, and behind this colourful visual presentation, Going Under communicates its own message with consistency." Stockdale also thought the combat had a good amount of depth to it, "It's easy to learn and by mixing together skills and apps... helped by a good variety of enemies so it never feels repetitive." He criticized the humor of the game, feeling that its reliance on meme culture already made it dated.

Gene Park of The Washington Post liked the game's visual style, comparing it to modern app interfaces. "The user interface is clean, attractive and addictive — just like all the best smartphone apps." Park also enjoyed the use of physics in combat, saying that it gave the relatively simple combat additional depth. "There's a physicality to Jackie's combat that you don't often feel in other rogue-like games. The 3-D physics give real weight to each swing of Jackie's weapons."
