= BattleBit Remastered =

- Developers: SgtOkiDoki, Vilaskis, TheLiquidHorse
- Publisher: SgtOkiDoki
- Engine: Unity
- Platform: Windows
- Release: June 15, 2023 (early access)
- Genre: Massively multiplayer online first-person shooter
- Mode: Multiplayer

BattleBit Remastered is a 2023 massively multiplayer online first-person shooter developed by a team of three indie developers—SgtOkiDoki, Vilaskis, and TheLiquidHorse—and published by SgtOkiDoki for Windows exclusively through Steam. Loosely set during a conflict between the United States and Russia, BattleBit Remastered allows up to 254 players to compete in player versus player matches on large maps. The game is strongly inspired by the Battlefield series by DICE, with similar gameplay mechanics to earlier entries in that series, such as team-oriented character classes and destructible environments.

BattleBit Remastered was released in early access on June 15, 2023 to positive reviews. It was also a financial success, with over 1.8 million copies sold within its first two weeks of release.

== Gameplay ==
BattleBit Remastered is a team-based multiplayer first-person shooter where players, divided into two opposing teams representing the United States Armed Forces and the Russian Armed Forces, battle each other to complete objectives on a large map. Players can choose to join 64-player (32 vs. 32), 128-player (64 vs. 64), and 254-player (127 vs. 127) servers, depending on the matchmaking option chosen in the main menu.

Players are divided into various squads in their team and can choose from one of six classes that have unique loadouts to fulfill certain roles: Squad Leader, tasked with commanding their squad, with the ability to place rally points for their squad to spawn at and are planned to be able to use their binoculars to order airstrikes; Assault, a basic and all-rounded fighter; Medic, tasked with healing and quickly reviving injured teammates; Support, centered around suppressive fire, with the ability to deploy ammunition boxes for teammates to resupply from; Engineer, centered around military engineering and sapping, with access to explosive weapons to destroy enemy structures and vehicles; and Recon, centered around overwatch, reconnaissance, and hit-and-run attacks.

Each class has limited access to certain weapons and equipment, though a diverse range of them exist under various types and subtypes of rifles, submachine guns, machine guns, handguns, grenades, and land mines; shotguns are notably not planned to be added, ostensibly due to their reduced role in modern warfare. Weapons are shared across each team, are unlocked based on the player's rank, and can be modified with attachments that are unlocked as the player gets more kills with them. Each class also has character customization based on the player's rank and team, with different headgear, body armor, utility belts, and backpacks that affect survivability and munitions carried. The game predominantly focuses on infantry combat, but based on the mode and map, players can also use an assortment of military vehicles and aircraft.

Gameplay centers around teamwork, and game mechanics and classes are accordingly designed to encourage this; for instance, while time-to-kill is short, players whose health has depleted enter a time-sensitive downed state instead of being outright killed, and any of their teammates can drag them to safety and revive them provided they have at least one bandage in their inventory, though Medics carry more bandages and can revive quicker. Players can also use explosives and vehicles to destroy certain structures in each map, creating access points to buildings while reducing overall cover and concealment.

Use of voice chat is optional but encouraged; in-game, all voice chat is in "proximity" (can only be heard within a certain distance) and can be heard by players on both teams. Content moderation is highlighted by the game through an automatic warning when joining a server, with punishment for cheating or hate speech.

=== Game modes ===
BattleBit Remastered has multiple game modes that vary based on the server size selected in matchmaking. Each mode has different types of maps and varying vehicle access. Players vote in a blind poll at the end of each match to choose the next map and game mode. Though a total of at least eighteen game modes were planned, only six have been implemented as of Update 1.9.3:

- Conquest: A large-scale mode where both teams fight to capture control points and whittle the enemy team's respawn tickets. As the maps used in Conquest are large, both teams have access to vehicles to help transport and support advances.
- Infantry Conquest: Conquest but only featuring transport-oriented vehicles, so as to focus on infantry combat.
- Domination: Essentially a smaller-scale version of Conquest with fewer control points, no vehicles, and a smaller map.
- Capture the Flag: A capture the flag mode where both teams fight to steal the enemy team's flag while protecting their own.
- Frontlines: A tug of war-esque mode where both teams advance through the map by capturing pairs of control points at a time (called "sectors"), while preventing the enemy team from advancing on them.
- Rush: An attack-versus-defend mode where one team must attack and destroy various military communications stations, while the other team must defend them. It is not available in 254-player servers.
- Invasion: Defenders are tasked with holding specific points on a map while attackers capture them. There is a time limit for both sides to achieve their goals.

== Development ==
BattleBit Remastered was first announced on Steam Greenlight as BattleBit in December 2016 as the first project for SgtOkiDoki, Vilaskis, and TheLiquidHorse. The three indie developers are the game's only creators and their previous experiences were in creating mods. They cited games such as Battlefield, Squad, Insurgency: Sandstorm, Ace of Spades, and Hell Let Loose as inspiration.

The original intent of BattleBit was to provide a milsim experience that would be accessible to players with less-powerful hardware, with their own experiences playing on laptops and older desktop computers shaping their concerns. However, as development continued and beta testing took place, the decision was made to shift towards a more casual but realism-themed experience. Despite the addition of "Remastered" in the game's name, BattleBit Remastered is not actually a remaster or remake of any existing game; rather, its name is an in-joke referencing how frequently development had to restart.

In the year prior to its release, the game's popularity saw exponential increase with over 800,000 Steam users adding the game to their wishlist since January 2022, which was attributed to word-of-mouth marketing as well as streamer exposure to pre-release copies of the game.

Anti-cheat is handled by Easy Anti-Cheat, but is planned to be replaced by a variant of FACEIT designed to be compatible with Linux and thus also the Steam Deck's SteamOS.

== Reception ==
According to gaming website PC Gamer, BattleBit Remastered remains one of the most popular games on Steam in mid-2023, with 1.8 million copies sold within two weeks of its initial release.

The game's overall simplicity was widely singled out for praise, and it was frequently compared to earlier Battlefield entries and as an alternative to Battlefield 2042. Morgan Park of PC Gamer positively described BattleBit Remastered as "An indie FPS that moves like Battlefield, behaves like hardcore milsim Squad, and looks like Roblox", and recommended it to "[m]ultiplayer FPS fans with the same service-game malaise". Patrick Gill of Polygon made similar comparisons and described it as a revival of the "nerdy mechanical depth and absolutely unhinged slapstick sandbox action" seen in shooters from the early 2010s such as Battlefield: Bad Company 2 and Battlefield 3. Eric Van Allen of Destructoid agreed, comparing it to Battlefield 2 as "a piece of the FPS landscape I'd thought lost". Comparing BattleBit Remastered to the Battlefield series, Gabriel Moss of IGN stated BattleBit had "most of the trappings of a proper Battlefield game", but criticized the longer revive system and the unusual vehicle mechanics. Chris Allnutt of the Financial Times noted the game lacked elements common in other shooters such as a detailed plot or a flashy interface, in a positive revive. Ben Sledge of TheGamer summarized it as "a good, old-fashioned team shooter like your mama used to make."

The game's low poly graphics and optimization were highlighted by reviewers. Rosalie Newcomb of PCGamesN suggested the game "could probably run on a toaster". Allnutt noted the game's relatively small size of 2 gigabytes, which he compared to the sizes of contemporary shooters, such as the 125 gigabyte size of Call of Duty: Modern Warfare II. Many commentators compared BattleBit Remastered's visual style to that of Roblox, to the point that the developers had to clarify a lack of relation in the official website's FAQ section.

Map design and the destructible environment mechanic were well-received as factors that could dynamically affect the course of a battle, though Van Allen noted the design of some maps could result in battles becoming deadlocked as players often resorted to simply throwing grenades and launching sporadic charges from secure positions instead of strategizing and coordinating. The teamwork-oriented gameplay and emphasis on voice chat were also noted in various reviews to have improved player relations around the initial release, with squad coordination and "impromptu roleplay" noted among players.

The game's playerbase has "dramatically dropped" since its release in 2023; at its peak, BattleBit had 87,323 players, but by summer 2025 it had lowered to just over 1,000. Joshua Brown of PCGamesN noted this was likely due to a lack of updates and developer communications since early 2024, which had left the game with gameplay, balancing, and performance issues, with many players considering the game "abandoned". Despite this, Brown still recommended BattleBit as a simpler and low-spec alternative to modern titles. A major update to address these issues and refresh the game, "Operation Overhaul", has been in development since 2025.
