= Totally Accurate Battle Simulator =

2019 video game

- Developer: Landfall
- Publishers: Landfall; XD Network (Mobile)
- Engine: Unity
- Platforms: macOS; Microsoft Windows; Android iOS; Xbox One; Nintendo Switch; PlayStation 4
- Release: macOS, Windows; April 1, 2021; Xbox One; October 5, 2021; Nintendo Switch; November 3, 2022; PlayStation 4 September 5, 2023; PlayStation 5 December 17, 2024 iOS, Android; August 7, 2025
- Genre: Strategy
- Modes: Single-player, multiplayer

Totally Accurate Battle Simulator (TABS) is a physics-based strategy video game developed and published by Landfall. An alpha version was initially released in 2016 to a small audience while the developers focused on another game, ClusterTruck. The full version was released in early access for macOS and Windows on April 1, 2019, and received regular updates that improved the performance, addressed technical issues, and added new maps, units, and features. The game left early access and had its full release on April 1, 2021. It was later released for the Xbox One in October 2021, for the Nintendo Switch in November 2022, for the PlayStation 4 in September 2023, for the PlayStation 5 in December 2024, and for Android and iOS in August 2025.

== Gameplay ==
Totally Accurate Battle Simulator is a physics-based battle simulator, where the player creates an army of units to oppose an enemy army. The game encompasses two main modes: Campaign and Sandbox. In the former, the player is given a limited amount of in-game currency to build an army and defeat their opponent; in the latter, there is no currency limit and the player builds both armies. The two opposing armies can be placed on either opposite sides of the map, or one can surround the other, while unit placement is left up to the player. As soon as the player hits "Start", the battle begins and the units, controlled by artificial intelligence, rush forward to attack each other.

Once either army has been defeated, the battle abruptly ends and the game displays the winning side. While an army typically wins by defeating all enemy units, an update released in May 2020 added new winning conditions, such as surviving for a given amount of time or killing a specific enemy unit. During ongoing battles, players can move the camera around the map to get a better view of the fight, and can slow down or freeze time themselves. With the addition of a May 2019 update, players are also able to 'possess' units—controlling them manually from a third- or first-person perspective.

The game features over 130 units across 14 factions, which are mostly themed around different cultures and eras of human history. Such factions include the Tribal Faction (Prehistory), Farmer (Neolithic Revolution), Medieval (Middle/Dark Ages), Ancient (Classical Era), Viking (Viking Age), Dynasty (Ming Dynasty, Sengoku Period, and Joseon), Renaissance (Italian Renaissance), Pirate (Golden Age of Piracy), and Wild West (American Frontier). There are also five fictional factions: Spooky (themed around Halloween), Secret (consisting of hidden units that can be found on each map), Legacy, and Good & Evil (based on storytelling tropes of good and evil and having angelic and demonic themes, respectively). Additional factions, such as Aztec, Napoleonic, World War, Neon, and Desert Kingdom, were planned at various stages during the game's development, but were scrapped before the final release. Many units have special abilities that are unique to them or they share with a few others, such as flight, projectile deflection, and teleportation. The maps are centered around the same themes as the factions and differ in size and geography. In addition to the 22 regular maps, there are 22 blank "Simulation" maps which were designed to test the game's physics and the units' AI. Various Easter eggs are hidden on each map for players to find, including the aforementioned Secret units.

Players can create their own battle scenarios, choosing from any of the available units, maps, and winning conditions. A December 2020 update added the Unit Creator, where players can create their own units, giving them abilities, clothing, and weapons from the already existing TABS units, as well as the spin-offs Totally Accurate Battlegrounds and Totally Accurate Battle Zombielator. Both custom battles and units can be shared with other players via the in-game workshop. The full release of the game in April 2021 added both online and local multiplayer modes, and achievements. An additional update on 20 November 2022 added a map creator, allowing players to create their own battlefields and landscapes.

== Development ==
A player creating armies in the Sandbox mode (version from 2019)

The game was made during a week-long game jam in a Swedish castle, and was developed using the Unity game engine. Landfall released the download for people who signed up to their website in July 2016. The game was released in open alpha in November 2016, while the closed alpha was released in December 2016. The full version was released in early access on Steam on April 1, 2019, for Windows and macOS.

On June 9, 2019, at the E3 convention, Xbox announced via their Indie Developers program that TABS would be coming to Xbox One in the Xbox Game Pass later that year. It was released via Xbox Game Preview on December 20, 2019. On April 1, 2020, downloadable content (DLC) for the game, titled the Bug DLC, was released, adding various "game-breaking bugs". While the DLC was made available for free to all players, it could also be purchased for 5 USD for a limited time, with half the money raised being donated to Doctors Without Borders.

The game left early access for Windows and macOS on April 1, 2021. The Xbox One version was released on October 5, 2021, followed by a Nintendo Switch port on November 3, 2022, with a version for the PlayStation 4 released on September 5, 2023. The PlayStation 5 version was released on December 17, 2024, and a port for iOS and Android was released on August 7, 2025.

Despite players wanting more updates for the game, Landfall put out a statement saying that TABS will not receive any more updates despite themselves wishing they could. The main reason they stated they won't update the game is; "Essentially the code base is really old and complex and even opening the project in unity can sometimes take a full work day. The project is just so big that it keeps crashing."

== Reception ==
The game received generally positive reviews. It has been referred to as a "vibrant and goofy take on chaotic combat", and its "silly graphics and kind of wonky body physics" were told to be part of the "charming appeal of an otherwise realistic simulator". The game has also been noted as "brilliant in its simplicity" and "outstanding". The battles were described as "madness" but with a "clever piece of mathematical symmetry", reminding people about armies of toys they used to build in their childhood.

== Spin-offs ==
Two spin-offs, Totally Accurate Battle Zombielator, which parodies the survival horror genre, and Totally Accurate Battlegrounds, a parody of the battle royale genre, were released on April 1, 2017, and June 5, 2018, respectively.
