= Totally Accurate Battlegrounds =

2018 video game

- Developer: Landfall
- Publisher: Landfall
- Engine: Unity
- Platform: Microsoft Windows
- Release: June 5, 2018
- Genre: Battle royale
- Mode: Multiplayer

Totally Accurate Battlegrounds (TABG) is a multiplayer battle royale video game developed by Swedish studio Landfall, and a spin-off of Totally Accurate Battle Simulator (TABS). Similarly to how TABS parodies the battle simulator genre of video games, TABG is a parody of the battle royale genre, primarily titles such as PlayerUnknown's Battlegrounds and Fortnite, and features exaggerated player and weapon physics. The game was released on Steam on June 5, 2018.

== Gameplay ==
The game plays similarly to other games in the battle royale genre, in which players must traverse a shrinking safe area, collecting weapons, blessings, and grenades along the way in order to fight and eliminate opponents, and aim to be the last remaining player or team. However, the game is differentiated by a physics engine which produces exaggerated character motions when moving or using weapons (including stretching limbs and exaggerated knockback when using guns), the ability to dual-wield some weapons, a self-constructing wall functioning as the game's "storm," and a wide array of weapons directly pulled from or influenced by weapons in the real world. The walls close together as the ring finishes, closing off anything behind it in the darkness, removing them from the match. (Essentially the games "storm").

Totally Accurate Battlegrounds features a multi-tier "blessing" system which players can utilize by collecting rings of various colors (said colors depicting the tier the blessing falls under) and placing them in one of 3 inventory slots. Blessings provide various benefits, some examples of which include increased movement speed, faster weapon firing speed, increased health points, and health regeneration.

== Release ==
Totally Accurate Battlegrounds was initially intended to be released on April 1, 2018, as an April Fool's Day joke, serving as a spin-off of developer Landfall's previous game, Totally Accurate Battle Simulator. However, its release was delayed to June 5, in order to address server problems with the game. Landfall stated that the game would be available for free for 100 hours after its release on Steam, after which it would cost $5.

In March 2020, Landfall announced that they would slowly begin to develop TABG again, but clarified that they were still working full time on Totally Accurate Battle Simulator. In the announcement, they showed off several screenshots of the new map in development. On April 6, 2020, Landfall released a beta version featuring the new map. In the following months, they released multiple temporary betas showcasing improvements to the map, new weapons, new vehicles, and performance optimizations. In April 2021, the game became free-to-play. In February 2022, Landfall announced that they have stopped developing further updates for the game following a steady decrease in the size of the playerbase.

On June 26, 2023, Landfall announced that the TABG servers had been experiencing a DDoS attack. This closed the servers for an indefinite amount of time, until the developers fixed the vulnerabilities with their servers. On August 17, 2023, the servers went back online.

== Reception ==
Kotaku felt that Totally Accurate Battlegrounds was both a parody of and homage to the genre, describing the average match as beginning with "madcap rushes of wacky, wavy-arm-flailing players who scramble for weapons or just flat-out slapfight each other to death", and that its "haphazard" combat "manages to make each new encounter feel surprising and high-stakes". Rock Paper Shotgun said that despite "wacky physics" being a "tired joke", the game did provide several unique features over other games in the genre, including dual-wielding of guns, a rapidly-constructing wall to serve as the barrier for the safe area rather than an encroaching "storm", as well as not depending on microtransactions to obtain cosmetic player skins. However, it was noted that matchmaking times for games were slow due to its smaller player population in comparison to Fortnite and PlayerUnknown's Battlegrounds. As of August 2018, the game was the 18th most popular game on Steam, with over 27,000 players.
