= Stick Fight: The Game =

- Developer: Landfall
- Publisher: Landfall
- Engine: Unity
- Platforms: Microsoft Windows, Mac, Nintendo Switch, PlayStation, Xbox, Android
- Release: September 28, 2017
- Genres: Action, fighting
- Mode: Multiplayer

Stick Fight: The Game is an action fighting multiplayer-only video game developed and published by Landfall Games on Steam on September 28, 2017. Later, the game was ported to Nintendo Switch, PlayStation, Xbox and Android.

== Gameplay ==
The player takes control over a stick figure character of one of four colours: red, yellow, green or blue; each round, they are placed on a different map, with the goal of defeating other three players by controlling physics-based character's body movement, performing various kicks, punches or jumps. Periodically, various weapons with different abilities appear on the map, which can be equipped and used in the fight. Players can also parry each others attacks, fully blocking the damage.

Maps can contain different interactive objects like lasers or spikes that instantly kill the player on contact, or explosive barrels, that deal significant amounts of damage. Several maps contain "bossfights", where one player is given unique abilities and boosts, while other players must defeat them. If any player falls outside the map, it will be counted as defeat. The game also supports the creation of custom maps made by users, as well as modding outside of Steam Workshop.

== Reception ==
The game has been widely noted as "goofy" and "simplistic, but smart", placing players under "ridiculous circumstances". Other reviewers highlighted the incredible speed of the game process, where the death can occur in "the first 5 seconds". In total, Stick Fight was received well, often described as "superb game to waste some time". Some reviewers also stated that it is reminiscent of stick figure animations that appeared in the early 2000's, like Animator vs. Animation by Alan Becker, bringing the nostalgia of "childhood days".
