= Landfall (company) =

Swedish video game company

Landfall Games AB
- Type: Private
- Industry: Video games
- Founded: 2015; 11 years ago
- Founders: Petter Henriksson; Wilhelm Nylund; Philip Westre
- Headquarters: Stockholm, Sweden
- Key people: Wilhelm Nylund (CEO); Petter Henriksson (COO); Tim Käll (CFO); Rebecca Lautner (CBO)
- Number of employees: 11
- Website: landfall.se

Landfall Games AB (commonly known as simply Landfall) is a Swedish independent video game developer and publisher based in Stockholm. It was founded in 2015 and is best known for developing and publishing video games such as Clustertruck (2016), Totally Accurate Battlegrounds (2018), Totally Accurate Battle Simulator (2021), Content Warning (2024) and Peak (2025).

Landfall is known for publishing their games on April Fools' Day. The studio specializes on physics-based games. On their official website, they describe themselves with a quote of Petter Henriksson, the COO of the company: "Small studio staying small. Makes physics games, also other games, sometimes funny. Doing well, now funds things sometimes, only cool stuff."

== History ==
In 2014, Philip Westre and Wilhelm Nylund released their first game called Air Brawl, a "fast-paced multiplayer dogfighting game" they started to develop when they were still Swedish high school students. The game was nominated for the Swedish Game Awards in 2014, and a year after, on June 2, 2015, was published on Steam.

In 2015, after the release of Square Brawl, the development of Clustertruck began. The game was described as a "chaotic physics-based truckformer" and inspired by Nylund, who while traveling home from Gamescom, imagined himself escaping traffic by jumping on trucks to get home faster. The game was developed by the trio of Westre, Nylund and Petter Henriksson with the help of Karl Flodin on sound and music. Clustertruck was released on Steam by American publisher tinyBuild on September 27, 2016 and became a commercial success. The game was often compared to "The floor is lava".

In November 2016, Landfall premiered an alpha-version of Totally Accurate Battle Simulator. Abbreviated as TABS, the game is a physics-based strategy game, where the player can create armies for a limited amount of in-game value to defeat an enemy force. The game was fully released on April 2, 2021 together with another game known as Rounds. TABS received generally positive reviews, and as of August 2025 remains the most popular game by Landfall, having over 120,000 reviews on Steam, of which about 97% are positive. 2018 saw the release of Totally Accurate Battlegrounds, a battle royale game in the style of TABS. The game was released for free on Aprils Fools' Day and attracted "about 3 million" players in the following two days.

On April 1, 2024, Landfall released a co-op survival-horror video game called Content Warning. The game was free to claim on the day of release which was done by 6.6 million Steam users. It reached over 50 thousand concurrent players in the first twelve hours after launch and about 2.2 million sales after 2 months on Steam. Content Warning was a huge success for Landfall, which attracted more players to the company's other games.

On June 17, 2025, Landfall published a new game together with American developer Aggro Crab - Peak - a cooperative climbing game, where the player's goal is to scale a mountain in various environments. The game reached over 100,000 concurrent players in less than one week after its release, and was greeted with very positive reviews on Steam. After the release, Aggro Crab's Twitter account commented on the game's success: "Why did this stupid jam game sell more copies than Another Crabs Treasure I'm gonna crash out".

== List of games ==
Year	Title	Platform(s)
2015	Air Brawl	Windows, macOS, Linux
2015	Square Brawl	Windows, macOS, Linux
2016	Clustertruck	Windows, macOS, Linux, Xbox One
2017	Stick Fight: The Game	Windows, macOS, iOS, Android, PlayStation 4, Xbox One, Xbox Series X/S, Nintendo Switch
2018	Totally Accurate Battlegrounds	Windows
2019	Totally Accurate Battle Simulator	Windows, macOS, PlayStation 4, Xbox One, Nintendo Switch, PlayStation 5, iOS, Android
2021	Rounds	Windows, Xbox One, Xbox Series X/S, PlayStation 5, Nintendo Switch
2022	Knightfall: A Daring Journey	Windows
2023	Landfall Archives	Windows
2024	Content Warning	Windows, Xbox Series X/S, PlayStation 5, Nintendo Switch, Nintendo Switch 2
2025	Haste: Broken Worlds	Windows, macOS, Linux, Playstation 5, Xbox Series X/S, Nintendo Switch 2
2025	Peak	Windows, PlayStation 5, Xbox Series X/S, Nintendo Switch 2
