= Peak (video game) =

2025 video game

- Developers: Aggro Crab; Landfall
- Publishers: Aggro Crab; Landfall
- Engine: Unity
- Platforms: Windows; Nintendo Switch 2; PlayStation 5; Xbox Series X/S
- Release: Windows; 16 June 2025; Nintendo Switch 2, PlayStation 5, Xbox Series X/S; 22 October 2026
- Genre: Action-adventure
- Modes: Single-player, multiplayer

Peak (stylised in all caps) is a cooperative climbing video game developed and published by Aggro Crab and Landfall Games for Microsoft Windows via Steam on 16 June 2025. Console ports for the Nintendo Switch 2, PlayStation 5 and Xbox Series X/S were released on 22 October 2026. Played in a first-person perspective, up to four players must climb a randomly pre-generated mountain through unique environments to reach rescue. Along the way, players can collect and use items to assist in their ascent.

The game was met positively by critics, widely described with the term "friendslop", and was a major financial success, selling over ten million copies. A major update, "The Final Ascent", was released on 11 August 2026, with bugfixes and other maintenance updates coming after. On 22 October 2026, the game was ported to the PS5, Switch 2, and Xbox with online crossplay.

== Gameplay ==
Three players climbing toward a luggage case in the 'Alpine' region

Peak is a co-op climbing video game played from a first-person perspective. Players assume the role of castaway Scouts who must climb a mountain through a series of pre-generated levels in order to reach rescue after surviving a plane crash. The game supports up to four players who can communicate via proximity chat. Every 24 hours at 17:00 UTC, the game rotates level environments and layouts, allowing for repeated replay value.

While climbing, players must maintain their personal stamina bar, which shrinks in capacity when affected by environmental status effects including hunger, injury, weight of held items, poison, extreme temperature. Players can carry and utilise items found in the natural game world as well as in luggage cases littered throughout the map by the Scouts' crashed plane. Many items are consumable, and can impact status effects or provide temporary bonuses like unlimited stamina. Players can also utilise backpacks to increase inventory space and use traversal items such as rope spools and pitons to streamline their ascent.

Players will fall unconscious if their stamina capacity is completely negated by status effects. If an unconscious player's stamina is not restored quickly, they die. Players may resurrect dead teammates through the use of relevant items or special altars found at the end of each level.

Peak is divided into six levels, each a different biome with unique obstacles and items. Level 1 is always a sand beach level called "The Shore", Level 2 rotates between two biome variants, named "Tropics", a jungle, and "Roots", a mushroom forest with zombies; Level 3 rotates between the cold "Alpine" region or as a deserted "Mesa". Levels 4-5 change between Caldera and Kiln, a volcanic region, or Gloom and Citadel, a supernatural bog and booby-trapped stronghold. One of the most notable enemies, the "Scoutmaster", appears when a player travels too far from the rest of the group (~200m above), or when it is summoned through the use of a relevant item.

Upon reaching the sixth biome titled "Peak", players complete the game and unlock harder difficulty. Cosmetic items can be unlocked through completion of in-game achievements (which the game dubs "Accolades"). The "Final Ascent" update introduced an alternate ending that requires collecting 4 gems throughout the game, which will transport players from the "Peak" to a location called "Nadir" where the Scoutmaster's soul is sealed and can be freed by the players.

== Development ==
Peak was originally developed as part of a one-month game jam held in February 2025 in South Korea. Developers planned the project as a small experiment between two studios, a "learning experience." The entire development was very spontaneous, described by one of the employees as "fun, fast and wild cowboy development", but at the same time "the most fun ever had making a game." It was later expanded into a fuller version and officially released on 16 June 2025. The game quickly grew in popularity on the live streaming platform Twitch, and the level of success has been compared to games like Lethal Company and Phasmophobia.

There have been three major updates that have released for the game, adding new biomes, items, cosmetics, and threats. The first update, released on 11 August 2025, added the Mesa biome for the as a map variation for Alpine - third level. The second update, released on 5 November 2025, added a fungal forest biome known as the Roots as a map variation for Tropics. "The Final Ascent" update, released on 11 August 2026, added two new biomes, Gloom - a foggy forest area - and The Citadel, a giant castle, which both act as map variation for Caldera and the Kiln, respectively.

== Marketing ==
=== Merchandising ===
Aggro Crab partnered with Makeship to release two Peak plushies, one based on the player character and another based on Bing Bong, the mascot of the in-universe airline called 'BingBong Airlines' and a plush that can be found in-game. They also have created figurines available on YouTooz. Other merch includes shirts, hats, and a poster available on Fangamer and more shirts, hats, pins, stickers, a notebook, and a free colouring page available at Mighty Merch.

=== Collaborations ===
In March 2026, Peak collaborated with Fortnite to release a cosmetic bundle in the Fortnite Item Shop inspired by the game. In December 2025, Peak collaborated with Bbno$ to release an in-game concert that starred the rapper. For the event, a statue of the rapper was added into the game, holding a bugle item; grabbing the bugle out of the hands of the statue and playing it triggered the event, causing depictions of Bbno$, Ironmouse, and vlogger Vanillamace to appear in the water, and perform pre-recorded songs for the player.

== Reception ==
Reception

Aggregate scores
Aggregator	Score
Metacritic	82/100
OpenCritic	100% recommend (Note: Based on 6 reviews)

Review scores
Publication	Score
Game Informer	9/10
PC Gamer (US)	86/100
The Games Machine (Italy)	8.2/10

Peak received "generally favourable" reviews, according to review aggregator website Metacritic. OpenCritic determined that 100% of critics recommend the game.

PC Gamer rated the game 86/100, commenting that it is a "fantastically crafted game" and "everything I'd want from a co-op game" with "fantastic value for its money." TheGamer described the game as "the best friendslop game I've ever played." Vice described the game as the "best in its class", and since the very announcement they knew it would be "magic." Other reviewers consider Peak one of the best climbing games ever, noting that it is "silly" and fun. Some journalists also compared Peak to Cairn - a different climbing game, focused not on the cooperative work, but on quieter, more deliberate and isolated experience.

=== Sales ===
AGGRO CRAB 💥
(@AggroCrabGames)
tweeted:

why did this stupid jam game sell more copies than another crabs treasure im gonna crash out

22 June 2025

Within the first 24 hours of release, the game sold over 100,000 copies. Sales surpassed one million copies within the first week, outselling Aggro Crab's previous title Another Crab's Treasure. By the ninth day after release, total sales reached two million copies, and surpassed 5 million sales within the first month. In mid-August 2025, it was announced that the game had sold over ten million copies.

The Aggro Crab social media account posted about the game's success, with sarcastic frustration about how the game performed better than Another Crab's Treasure.

=== Awards ===
Year	Award	Category	Result	Ref.
2025	Golden Joystick Awards	Ultimate Game of the Year	Nominated	
2025	Golden Joystick Awards	Best Multiplayer Game	Won	
2025	Golden Joystick Awards	Best Indie Game - Self-Published	Nominated	
2025	Golden Joystick Awards	PC Game of the Year	Nominated	
2025	Golden Joystick Awards	Streamer's Choice	Won	
2025	The Streamer Awards	Stream Game of the Year	Won	
2025	The Game Awards 2025	Best Multiplayer Game	Nominated	
2025	The Steam Awards 2025	Better With Friends	Won	
2026	British Academy Games Awards	Multiplayer	Longlisted	
2026	British Academy Games Awards	New Intellectual Property	Longlisted	
2026	Develop:Star Awards 2026	Best Game	Nominated	
2026	Develop:Star Awards 2026	Best Original IP	Won	
2026	Develop:Star Awards 2026	Best Small Studio (Landfall Games and Aggro Crab)	Won	
