= Clustertruck =

2016 video game

ClusterTruck
- Developer: Landfall
- Publisher: tinyBuild
- Director: Wilhelm Nylund
- Designer: Wilhelm Nylund
- Programmers: Petter Henriksson; Wilhelm Nylund; Philip Örum Westre
- Artist: Wilhelm Nylund
- Composer: Karl Flodin
- Engine: Unity
- Platforms: Linux, macOS, PlayStation 4, Windows, Xbox One, Nintendo Switch
- Release: Linux, Mac, PS4, Win, XONE; September 27, 2016; Switch; March 15, 2018
- Genre: Platform
- Mode: Single-player

Clustertruck is a 2016 platform game developed by the Swedish studio Landfall and published by tinyBuild. It consists of nine worlds in which the player must navigate by jumping on moving trucks to avoid obstacles and the ground, culminating in a boss fight. This concept originated from Landfall's founder, Wilhelm Nylund, picturing himself leaping across trucks to escape traffic.

Clustertruck was released for Linux, macOS, the PlayStation 4, Windows, and the Xbox One on September 27, 2016, followed by a version for the Nintendo Switch on March 15, 2018. While praised for its gameplay, graphics, and original soundtrack, its Nintendo Switch port was primarily criticized for its controls.

== Gameplay ==
In Clustertruck, the player must jump on trucks to reach the goal.

Clustertruck is a platformer game played from the first-person perspective. Across nine worlds with ten levels each, the player navigates to a designated goal by jumping across moving trucks with real-time physics that collide, flip, and tip over. During a level, the player may sprint or slow down time. Touching the ground or any obstacle triggers a game over. Each world introduces a new obstacle; for example, the third world has ice that causes trucks to be slippery, the fourth world adds lasers, and the sixth world adds a boulder that the player must run away from. Clustertruck culminates in a boss fight in the final world. The player may earn bonus points by skipping trucks or remaining airborne, which can be spent on power-ups, such as grappling hooks, double jumps, speed boosts, air dashes, and a jet pack. The player can use the level editor to construct and share custom levels.

With Clustertruck's Twitch integration, its developers and Twitch users can modify gameplay by voting in the chat. Modifications include rickrolling, time manipulation, color changing, on-screen messages, exploding trucks, earthquakes, laser trucks, high and low gravity, and inverted controls.

== Development and release ==
The development of Clustertruck began in 2015 and spanned one year. While traveling home from Gamescom in 2015, Wilhelm Nylund, the lead designer and CEO of Landfall, imagined himself escaping traffic by jumping on trucks to get home faster, inspiring him to develop the prototype of Clustertruck. New features were playtested and discussed within the team on whether it would be implemented. Building it in Unity, Landfall ultimately added power-ups and obstacles that passed. After a few months in development, an early alpha build was released. During the alpha phase, playtesters discovered they could finish levels early by reaching the front of the truck line. They messaged the developers on Discord to make Clustertruck more optimal for speedrunning.

Landfall planned to release Clustertruck by April 2016. This was postponed as its early popularity led the team to extend its development. At PAX South 2016, it was announced that Landfall had signed a publishing deal with tinyBuild. On September 27, 2016, Clustertruck released for Linux, macOS, the PlayStation 4, Windows, and the Xbox One, with an estimated 65,000 sales within its first month of release. In October 2016, Clustertruck was updated with a Halloween-themed map. On March 15, 2018, it was released for the Nintendo Switch.

For an April Fools' Day prank, Landfall created a parody of Superhot called Super Truck in 2016; similar to the original game, trucks would only move forward when the player does so. Permission was obtained from the Superhot development team prior to its production.

== Reception ==
Reception

Aggregate scores
Aggregator	Score			
Aggregator	NS	PC	PS4	Xbox One
Metacritic	74/100	76/100		69/100
OpenCritic		50% recommend		

Review scores
Publication	Score			
Publication	NS	PC	PS4	Xbox One
Destructoid		7.5/10		
HobbyConsolas	74/100			
Nintendo Life	8/10			
Nintendo World Report	7/10			
PC Games (DE)	7/10	8/10	8/10	8/10
Pocket Gamer	3.5/5			

Clustertruck received scores of 76/100 on Metacritic for the PC version, 74/100 for the Nintendo Switch port, and 69/100 for the Xbox One edition. On OpenCritic, it holds a 50% approval rating.

Critics generally praised Clustertruck's gameplay, likening it to the children's game the floor is lava. Other reviewers commended how the gimmicks in each world and stressful gameplay kept it fun. Emily Sowden of Pocket Gamer noted the sudden increase in difficulty, stating that it is "brutal" and "unfair at times" but also "super simple to pick up" for any player. Nintendo Life's Gonçalo Lopes praised it for "masterfully" implementing a combination of casual and hardcore gameplay and giving the player choices on how to beat a level. Nintendo World Report's Donald Theriault felt satisfied after finishing a challenging level, and HobbyConsolas's Alberto Lloret praised how its variety in worlds captivated players. Ian Dallas, for a Game Informer report, highlighted its "weird, surreal energy" of leaping across trucks and called it "the strangest game" since Katamari Damacy. While Peter Bathge of PC Games stated that high score lists incentivized players to purchase power-ups, Theriault felt that the double jump was the only necessary one. Writing for Destructoid, Peter Glagowski found the first world "disappointing" with a "weird", repetitive gimmick, adding on that its boss level was too long, went against its main premise, and "[sucked] the fun out".

Clustertruck was praised for its original soundtrack. Lopes felt the "catchy tunes" fit the chaotic gameplay, and Theriault, while critical that it "isn't all that memorable", appreciated how the music did not restart with each new level attempt. Lopes noted that its use of flat, shaded polygons helped to maintain performance.

The Nintendo Switch port faced criticism for its controls. Some critics stated that turning the camera with the right Joy-Con's analog stick was too sensitive. Bathge found it "almost impossible" to control the player's jump and rotate the camera simultaneously with the same controller. Theriault thought it "ran fine" on the Nintendo Switch, and Lloret argued that its short levels fit with the console's "portable nature" due to their length.
