= Timberborn =

- Developer: Mechanistry
- Publisher: Mechanistry
- Composer: Zofia Domaradzka
- Engine: Unity
- Platforms: macOS; Windows
- Release: September 15, 2021 (early access); March 12, 2026 (full release)
- Genre: City-building
- Mode: Single-player

Timberborn is a 2026 city-building video game developed and published by Mechanistry. Players help a colony of beavers survive resource shortages.

== Gameplay ==
Players control a colony of beavers in a post-apocalyptic wasteland where humans have died out. Players build cities, using dams and irrigation systems to manage water and make the land more habitable. Water wheels and other structures provide power for production chains.

Players must manage seasonal droughts (and later updates add toxic "badwater"), which reduce water supply and can damage crops. This makes resource storage and planning important for survival.

The game includes two factions with different buildings and production styles, encouraging different strategies. New settlements can be built and managed separately, with resource sharing becoming important as colonies expand.

Progression is based on research, unlocking new buildings and upgrades over time.

== Development ==
Timberborn major update release timeline
2019	Alpha
2020	Beta
2021	Demo
2021	Early Access Release
2021	Update 1
2022	Update 2
2022	Update 3
2023	Update 4
2024	Update 5 - Badwater
2024	Update 6 - Wonders of Water
2025	Update 7 - Ziplines & Tubeways
2026	1.0
2026	1.1

The developer, Mechanistry, is based in Poland. Timberborn entered alpha on November 18, 2019 and closed beta on June 18, 2020. The demo of Timberborn released on January 26, 2021. The initial build did not simulate water and featured green land with water levels that dropped during droughts. After researching physics-based simulations of water, Mechanistry realized it could open up many more options. They changed the land to be more of a wasteland, implemented irrigation and dams, and gave beavers the ability to swim. Timberborn entered early access on September 15, 2021. As of May 2025, Timberborn has received seven major updates after its early-access release. The game was scheduled to leave early access and be fully released on March 5, 2026. The release of 1.0 was later delayed to March 12, 2026.

After nearly five years in early access, Timberborn was fully released on March 12, 2026, marking the end of its Early Access development period. Version 1.0 introduced a range of final-release additions and polish improvements, including expanded automation systems, new late-game structures, visual enhancements, quality-of-life improvements, and narrative content delivered through official promotional materials. The full release consolidated all seven major Early Access updates into a complete version of the game.

=== Update 1 ===
The first major update to Timberborn was released on December 17, 2021. The update added new ways to mine and use metal, new water pumps and water wheels, a new tree, the Chestnut, two plants, Cattails and Spadderdocks, a new science building, and new attractions. Update 1 also added new and updated resource-processing buildings. Additionally, it included balance changes and bug fixes.

=== Update 2 ===
The second major update to Timberborn was released on September 14, 2022. It primarily focused on golems, adding golems and the buildings related to them. Update 2 also included terraforming, a new science building, and a battery. The update also included two new features: the ability to migrate populations and a rework of the well-being system with the addition of two buildings and a status. The last addition in the update was negative effects and the things that come with them, including new statuses, buildings, and a new resource, the Dandelion. Additionally, it included balance changes and bug fixes.

=== Update 3 ===
The third major update to Timberborn was released on December 15, 2022. The update primarily focused on storage, adding a few new storage buildings and updating all of the others. Update 3 renamed golems to bots and changed buildings between Folktails and Iron Teeth to make the factions more unique. It added recyclable buildings, allowing resources to be regained. Much like Update 2, Update 3 updated the Settlement and Migration panels. Additionally, it included audio changes, balance changes, and bug fixes.

=== Update 4 ===
The fourth major update to Timberborn was released on May 24, 2023. The update mainly focused on farming, adding seven new crops, Kohlrabis, Canolas, Cassavas, Corn, Eggplants, and Coffee Bushes, two new trees, the Mangrove and Oak, and five buildings. Update 4 also added new monuments. It added two buildings and updated two buildings. Like the two previous updates, Update 4 changed districts again, replacing the District Gate with the District Crossing. It added a new map as well. Additionally, it included balance changes, audio changes, visual changes, and bug fixes.

=== Update 5 - Badwater ===
The fifth major update to Timberborn, Badwater, was released on January 18, 2024. The update focused on the titular badwater, a new toxic substance spilling out of badwater sources that contaminates beavers, only curable with Antidote (Folktails) or Extract (Iron Teeth). When a badtide occurs, even a normal water source releases badwater. With badwater, many related buildings were added. To accommodate for the update, the irrigation system was reworked and all twelve maps were changed. As well as badwater, several new attractions and decorations were released in Update 5. Additionally, it included balance changes, visual changes, and bug fixes.

=== Update 6 - Wonders of Water ===
The sixth major update to Timberborn, Wonders of Water, was released on October 10, 2024. This update overhauled the game's water physics; originally, water simulation used a 2D model, but this update replaced it with a 3D water simulation system. Some existing maps and structures in the game were updated in order to take advantage of these new systems, with several new complementary structures added. Aside from the water changes, this update also added "Wonders" (large, expensive structures which can serve as an end-game objective), official modding support, and a slew of other changes.

=== Update 7 - Ziplines & Tubeways ===
The seventh update, Ziplines & Tubeways, was released on May 8, 2025. It was first available in the Experimental branch on February 5, 2025. This update replaces the 2D land simulation with a 3D system. Additionally, new transportation methods have been introduced for both the Iron Teeth and Folktails. The Iron Teeth now have tubeways, while the Folktails have access to ziplines. Both of these transport methods increase beavers' movement speed in the game.

== Reception ==
Reception

Aggregate score
Aggregator	Score
OpenCritic	94% recommend (Note: Based on 17 reviews.)

Timberborn received positive reception during its Early Access period, with critics praising its distinctive water-based city-building mechanics and the steady expansion of gameplay systems through major updates. Its combination of survival management and engineering-focused design was frequently highlighted as a standout feature within the genre.

Upon its full release in March 2026, the game continued to receive generally favorable reviews. Critics praised its expanded systems, improved faction differentiation, and the depth of its water simulation and infrastructure mechanics. Some reviewers noted that while the game offered substantial strategic depth, its onboarding and early progression could feel challenging for new players.

The game had sold over one million copies by 2023 during its Early Access period, reflecting strong commercial performance prior to its full release.
