= Friendslop =

Video game genre

Friendslop is a slang word, used to describe a subgenre of cooperative indie games oriented around a low barrier of entry and social interaction, emphasizing gameplay in social groups. The name is a portmanteau of friend and the pejorative suffix -slop, as these social games tend to be low-budget, low-cost indie games intended to attract entire friend groups as an online social activity.

The friendslop genre is purported to have originated with the 2018 social deduction video game Among Us, with the popularity of the genre skyrocketing during the COVID-19 pandemic as a means of remotely connecting with friends during the COVID-19 quarantine.

The term "friendslop" originated from a tweet describing "friendfarming" as a contemporary trend in indie games. The popularity of the 2025 co-op survival video game Peak led to a drastic increase in use of the term amongst gaming media and players, shifting to a more descriptive usage, though it continued to be used as a derogatory term to accuse similar games of being cash-ins.

== Elements ==
Common elements of friendslop games include a low entry difficulty, frequently described in relation to Bushnell's Law, that allows people of any gaming skill to participate, and a focus on social interaction. Usually these games will feature a team working towards a common goal, such as climbing a mountain in Peak. Multiplayer team games with extraction gameplay elements like Lethal Company and R.E.P.O. are also often labeled as friendslop games. Proximity chat is common, giving a level of realism to the interactions between players, with some games even allowing their character models' mouths to lip sync with their voices. Many friendslop games also have a focus on physics interactions and utilize low-fidelity 3D graphics. These games are typically considered to be more affordable, usually costing US$20 or less. Another element sometimes used in a description of the term is the fact that the game would be unenjoyable when played alone.

== Reception ==
Jay Castello of Aftermath contended that friendslop was not a real game genre, saying that it had originated with anger at the supposed people who used it as a disposition towards "whimsy and joy", as well as the rising popularity of gameplay outside of grinding and stat padding. However, some developers have embraced the label to describe their games. Paige Wilson, community lead at Aggro Crab, said that the team had loved the term from the moment it was first introduced, and praising the term for bringing new excitement to co-op games. The studio Panic Stations! have also advertised their games as "friendslop," though clarifying that people should only call it that if they wanted to. Stuart Gillespie-Cook of House House, developers of Big Walk, felt that the usage of slop had "connotations of carelessness, which I don’t think any of those games are made with", though he also stated that he appreciated the convenience of an overarching label to refer to the different games within the genre.

Harper Jay MacIntyre of Inverse described friendslop as a response to the loneliness epidemic, giving players an essential space for socialization and communication despite their isolation, and creating "a real path to salvation from divisive and isolating times." She also stated that they showed a real desire from players to play something smaller and more inventive than AAA games, made by teams that engaged with fans. Ash Parrish of The Verge noted that the Nintendo Switch 2's GameChat feature offered significant potential for friendslop games to come to the platform. Chris Allnutt of the Financial Times defined friendslop as playing with friends, rather than the game matchmaking with strangers.

== Notable examples ==
Games that have been quoted as being referred to, or have been directly described, in journalism and media criticism as "friendslop" include:

Year	Title	Ref.
2018	Among Us	
2023	Lethal Company	
2023	Scary Baboon	
2024	Content Warning	
2024	Webfishing	
2025	Guilty as Sock!	
2025	Mage Arena	
2025	Peak	
2025	R.E.P.O.	
2025	RV There Yet?	
2026	Gamble with Your Friends	
2026	Flock Around	
2026	Yapyap	
2026	Meccha Chameleon	
2026	How to Fish	
2026	BOMBANANA!	

== See also ==
- Walking simulator
- Social game
