= Big Walk =

2026 video game

- Developer: House House
- Publisher: Panic
- Designers: Stuart Gillespie-Cook; Nico Disseldorp; Michael McMaster; Jacob Strasser
- Composers: Sam Gill; Luke Neher
- Engine: Unity
- Platforms: macOS; Nintendo Switch 2; PlayStation 5; Windows
- Release: 4 August 2026
- Genre: Adventure
- Mode: Multiplayer

Big Walk is a 2026 cooperative adventure video game developed by Australian studio House House and published by Panic. It is an exploration-focused game in which players trek through an open-world bushland area and solve puzzles, communicating in many different ways.

Following the release of Untitled Goose Game in 2019, developers at House House felt a need for a virtual space during the COVID-19 pandemic lockdowns, creating a prototype of the game in response. The game's full development took six years. Big Walk features a proximity chat system and items which allow players, who appear as colourful segmented humanoid avatars, to communicate. The game's map, plant models and sound design are directly based upon the landscape, flora and fauna of Wilsons Promontory, a national park in Australia. It was released for macOS, Windows, PlayStation 5, and Nintendo Switch 2 on 4 August 2026.

Big Walk received critical acclaim, with praise for its environment, puzzles, creativity, and social interaction. Several critics have discussed the game in relation to the "friendslop" genre, with many differentiating it from the genre on the basis of its tone and design. Big Walk was nominated several times at the Golden Joystick Awards.

== Gameplay ==
Big Walk is a multiplayer cooperative adventure video game in which a group of players walk through an open-world environment. Players form a group of two to twelve in an online lobby, with content adjusting with the size of the group. The lobby host maintains save data, allowing other participants to join or leave.

Each player is represented by a humanoid avatar with a segmented head with eyes that glow in the dark, as well as a torso and legs. The game's tutorial area, which takes the form of a playground, contains various objects and a number of signs which teaches players how to jump, crouch, pick up objects such as cowbells, and use them. Players can learn the controls in any order, and are able to leave into the full game at any time.

Big Walk has a proximity chat system. The volume of players' voices changes depending on their location, becoming inaudible when a short distance away. This distance is shorter than many other co-operative games of the same type, meaning that players can become easily separated from one another. A day-night cycle and darkness at night requires players to use torches and other light sources to see each other. When players are too far to speak to each other, they can communicate through using hand signals, making noise, leaving messages on whiteboards, and using flashlights, laser pointers, megaphones, walkie-talkies, static broadcast stations, and flare guns.

Completion of puzzles requires players to use different methods of communication.

The objective of Big Walk is to complete puzzles, most involving teamwork. As a result of many of the puzzles limiting usual forms of communication such as speech, players must use novel methods to communicate with one another, including miming, singing or transmitting codes. Sound is a recurring theme in several puzzles. Upon completing a puzzle, players are rewarded with a purposely unnamed bulbous object with a shape similar to a butternut squash, which can either be red or purple for easier and harder puzzles respectively. These objects are variably referred to by players as "gourds", "peanuts", "beans", "babies", "heads", "nipples", and "Kongs", the latter in reference to a brand of dog toy. Completion of a number of puzzles unlocks features that allow players to further navigate the environment, including a map room to plot travel, a train, and a ski lift that traverses half of the world. A large amount of the game's soundtrack can only be found at various radio stations which players can find across the game world; in these places, there are collections of speakers that create spatial audio experiences. Players can also take radios with them to play the music while moving. Accessibility features include an ability to use text chat and to fully skip puzzles if it is not possible to complete them.

The game has two different endings. The first, nicknamed the Big Goodbye, is gated off by a large wall. Players must complete puzzles to unlock a black key inside a black tower, and using this key proceed past the wall to a giant black sphere, completing further puzzles there. The second ending requires 100% completion of all puzzles to obtain a white key. This unlocks a hidden theatre where the second ending takes place.

== Development and release ==
Big Walk was developed by Melbourne-based independent studio House House, creators of Untitled Goose Game. Untitled Goose Game had given the studio enough funds to remain afloat through the COVID-19 pandemic lockdowns and afterward. During this time, the developers and their friends used online video games to reduce their isolation from each other. Playing games such as Overwatch, they found inspiration from the waiting lobbies before each match. They wanted an alternative to their large Zoom meetings which would allow for side conversations, and as a solution envisioned a virtual space with proximity chat. They played the survival games Raft and Valheim, though later switched to the platform Roblox on which they played and gained inspiration from Scuba Diving at Quill Lake, the open-world train game Somewhere, Wales, and Theme Park Tycoon 2, developer Michael McMaster having designed a colourful "shape zone" in the latter.

Starting during the COVID-19 pandemic, a prototype for the game was created within one week. Early on, players could be one of two characters, though only one of these remains as the present player character model. The developers initially believed that what they were creating would be a non-commercial project. The full development of Big Walk took six years. House House co-founder Nico Disseldorp said that the development time was initially estimated to only be up to three years, and that "if someone had appeared and told us it'd take six years, we would've pulled the plug". Kalonica Quigley aided with play-testing, later becoming the studio's fifth member and working to design the game landscape alongside developer Jake Strasser. Owing to the COVID-19 lockdowns, team meetings were held in-game.

Big Walk's world is based on Wilsons Promontory.

During development, a small map was initially created using a photo scan of one of the Faroe Islands, though the developers have stated that they wanted something "more local". As such, the completed game's environment is an approximately 1:20 loose scale model of the Wilsons Promontory in south-east Victoria, Australia. Strasser has noted that the promontory had the "isolated video game level feeling that we needed". The team spent time on the promontory and stayed in a cabin at Tidal River, brainstorming, going on walks in the area, and taking reference photos. Strasser's partner proposed to him while on the trip. They used a lidar scan to create a 3D map of the promontory, and based on the research gathered, Quigley created and placed into the game's world 80 to 100 3D models of plants native to the promontory, according to Victoria's ecological vegetation class.

The first puzzle created for the game, according to developer Stuart Gillespie-Cook, was later removed as developers deemed it "un-fun". It involved one player opening doors for another in a tunnel. The large wall which gates off the end of the game was initially created as a way to block off puzzles which had not yet been fully developed, and was added permanently as developers liked the sense of mystery it added.

Sound design was helmed by Vancouver studio A Shell in the Pit. Em Halberstadt spent multiple days recording sounds in Wilsons Promontory such as kookaburras and quartz sand, the latter being recorded by Halberstadt punching the sand on Squeaky Beach with her fists. Halberstadt stated that all of the character sounds were made with a Kong dog toy, whereas the sounds for the bulbous objects were made with a butternut squash. After being recommended to the developers by Halberstadt, Nicholas Zhang joined to work on the technical side of the sound design, implementing features such as an echo when a player shouts from a cliff or when they enter a tunnel. The soundtrack was created in collaboration with artists Sam Gill and Luke Neher under the name AKSFX, the pair having previously created a track in the nightclub expansion for Grand Theft Auto V. The music is diegetic to the world, changing in accordance with the game's day-night cycle.

Big Walk was announced during the Game Awards in December 2023, accompanied by an announcement trailer. An official gameplay trailer was released on 7 June 2025, coinciding with the Steam Day of the Devs showcase. It was released on macOS, Windows, PlayStation 5, and Nintendo Switch 2 on 4 August 2026. Cross-platform play is supported. House House decided not to release Big Walk on Xbox Series X and Series S in accordance with the Palestinian-led campaign group Boycott, Divestment, and Sanctions, which calls to boycott Microsoft and lists Xbox and Microsoft Games as "priority" targets.

Following release, there was criticism that the volume control features made players' voices much quieter than intended "even when very close by". On 8 August, the studio stated they had fixed the issue, which they said was due to individual players' quiet microphone setups, though did not change the in-game distance at which players' voices could no longer be heard. Gillespie-Cook stated in August 2026 that there are "no content plans" for expansions or downloadable content. A mod which turns the game into a virtual reality experience, by indie developer CircuitLord, is available. Development on this mod began as soon as two days after the game's release.

=== Large language model usage ===
In the final stretch of development for the game, House House made use of large language models (LLMs), a form of generative AI, primarily for debugging third-party code. House House did not have an internal AI policy in place while developing the game, which they would later describe as "a failure". They later stated that the "LLMs were used sparingly by House House to help work through difficult technical challenges and bugs", that they "estimate that well under 0.1% of Big Walk's code had anything to do with this usage", and that "generative AI was not used in any other context when making the game". This usage was not disclosed until House House submitted Big Walk to the Independent Games Festival (IGF), as Steam did not require disclosure of AI usage through code or chatbots upon a game's release.

After House House disclosed their usage of LLMs, Big Walk was review bombed on Steam, receiving more than 400 negative reviews. IGF jurist Damon Reece stated that even though the game was "seriously special to [them]", not voting for Big Walk "is pain that has to happen [emphasis in original] to try and steer our culture away" from AI usage. Aftermath reporter Nathan Grayson stated that internet being "hollowed out" by AI companies was a factor that lead to fixing bugs and challenges with AI. However, he stated that doing so would result in an "even-more-hollowed-out" internet and would demotivate people from building alternatives to AI.

== Reception ==
Reception

Aggregate scores
Aggregator	Score
Metacritic	(NS2) 78/100 (PC) 91/100 (PS5) 91/100
OpenCritic	96% recommend

Review scores
Publication	Score
Eurogamer	5/5
Game Informer	9/10
GameSpot	9/10
Nintendo Life	8/10
PC Gamer (UK)	90%
PCGamesN	10/10
The Guardian	4/5

Following its announcement, several publications identified Big Walk as one of the best games of the Day of the Devs showcase. Matt Wales of Eurogamer praised the concept as "wonderfully distinctive". Adam Newell of Destructoid stated in 2025 that the puzzles seemed "wonderful" and "feels like a game where no two play sessions are the same".

Big Walk received "universal acclaim" reviews for the Windows and PlayStation 5 reviews while the Nintendo Switch 2 version received "generally favorable", according to review aggregator website Metacritic. Fellow review aggregator OpenCritic assessed that the game was recommended by 96% of critics.

Critics praised the co-operative gameplay design. Nintendo Life described it as the "purest and most rewarding" co-operative game ever played, commending its puzzle design as clever and its "strict reliance on communication", though noted low frame rates and reduced visual quality when playing on the Nintendo Switch 2.

Several reviewers favourably discussed Big Walk's similarities and differences to "friendslop", described as a genre of multiplayer indie games that centre social interactions and proximity chat as part of their gameplay. Although some wrote its co-operative gameplay and proximity chat bore a resemblance to the genre, critics also expressed that it was uniquely differentiated from other co-operative titles in its tone and design. The New York Times and developer Strasser suggested that the sharp increase in the popularity of these games over the course of Big Walk's development primed audiences for the game. Before the game's release, Rock Paper Shotgun included Big Walk in a proposed "hangout game" genre alongside Webfishing. The Wand Report compared Big Walk favourably to other indie games, such as Peak and A Short Hike. PC Gamer noted that the game was part of a rise in video games experimenting with the friction of basic movement, such as Cairn, Baby Steps, and Death Stranding.

The environment design was also praised, with several reviews describing the open world as realistic. Eurogamer stated its "organic elements" did not feel over-designed and helped encourage players to appreciate the natural beauty of its setting.

House House disclosed their usage of LLMs when Big Walk was being considered by jurors for the Independent Games Festival (IGF). Because nineteen IGF jurors had stated that they would not vote for any game that used generative AI during its development, this revelation caused "fairly intense discussion and disagreement across the judge and jury pools", partially due to its perceived contrast with progressive political stances held by House House.

=== Sales ===
Big Walk sold more than 1 million copies during its first week of release, and 2 million by 25 September.

=== Awards ===
Awards and nominations for Big Walk
Year	Award	Category	Result	Ref.
2026	Golden Joystick Awards	Ultimate Game of the Year	Nominated	
2026	Golden Joystick Awards	Best Audio Design	Nominated	
2026	Golden Joystick Awards	Best Game Trailer (Note: For release date trailer)	Nominated	
2026	Golden Joystick Awards	Best Indie Game	Nominated	
2026	Golden Joystick Awards	Best Multiplayer Game	Nominated	
2026	Golden Joystick Awards	PC Game of the Year	Nominated	
2026	Golden Joystick Awards	Critics' Choice	Won	
2026	The Streamer Awards	Stream Game of the Year	Pending	
2026	The Game Awards 2026	Best Independent Game	Pending	
2026	The Game Awards 2026	Best Family Game	Pending	
2026	The Game Awards 2026	Best Multiplayer Game	Pending	
2026	The Game Awards 2026	Games for Impact	Pending	
