= Sledding Game =

Upcoming sports video game

- Developer: The Sledding Corporation
- Publisher: The Sledding Corporation
- Engine: Unity
- Platform: Windows
- Release: 30 April 2026
- Genre: Casual game
- Mode: Multiplayer

Sledding Game is an early access indie multiplayer sports video game developed by United States-based solo developer Maximilian Porter. Released on Steam and Xbox on April 30, the game focuses on casual cooperative sledding, allowing players to explore a snowy mountain, use chairlifts, perform tricks, race, play minigames, and socialize through proximity voice chat.

Shortly after launch, the game sold more than 100,000 copies and received an "Overwhelmingly Positive" user rating on Steam. Critics' reviews describe it as a charming but underdeveloped "social sandbox", praising its light-hearted atmosphere while criticising its sparse environment and mechanics.

The game has been variously described as friendslop and a "hangout game".
