= Moida Mansion =

2024 video game

- itch.io version cover
- Developer: Lucas Pope
- Platform: Web
- Release: 31 October 2024
- Mode: Single-player

Moida Mansion is a 2024 video game by independent developer Lucas Pope. It is a browser game that imitates the visual design and gameplay of a handheld electronic game. Players are tasked with searching the rooms of Moida Mansion to locate their friends, while avoiding being caught by The Monsta. Pope developed the game after he released similar titles, including a 2023 remake of Papers Please. Following its release, Moida Mansion received praise for its resemblance to LCD handheld game displays and the variety of its puzzles within the limitations of its visual design.

== Gameplay ==
The presentation of Moida Mansion imitates the design of a liquid crystal display on a handheld electronic game.

Moida Mansion is visually presented as an imitation of a handheld game device with an LCD screen featuring gameplay elements and an overlay with pressable buttons. Instructions are presented as a digital instruction manual on the game page. The objective of the game is to locate all four members of the Adventure Club: Cal, Dot, Bek and Ace, who have become trapped inside Moida Mansion in search of their mascot turtle, Dot. Players use two directional arrows to navigate between the rooms of Moida Mansion, and an additional button to climb or descend stairs. A magnifying glass button is used to search objects in each room, which can display visual cues if something is behind them. Searching may uncover a hidden member of the club, a key, secret code or trapdoor to assist in navigation across the Mansion. Occasionally, searching will make a monster named The Monsta appear behind windows or doors and chase the player, requiring them to leave the room to avoid being caught and ending the game. The game is randomised every time it is played, changing the layout of the Mansion and location of Club members and items.

== Development ==
Moida Mansion was created by independent developer Lucas Pope. Pope created the game following a series of aesthetically similar releases including Mars After Midnight in 2024 and an LCD-themed remake of Papers Please in 2023. Pope created the game with separate code from prior efforts, designing it using Nim as an opportunity to learn a new programming language. He stated the LCD design of Moida Mansion was helpful for "quick experimenting" and the "satisfyingly oppressive" restrictions of the format of handheld games. The game was published on 31 October 2024.

== Reception ==
Several critics praised Moida Mansion's likeness to the design of early handheld games, with comparisons made between the game and Tiger Electronics and Game & Watch titles. Shuan Cichaki of Vice praised the "love and care put into tiny details" of the game, citing the "accurate soundbites", the "detailed and period-accurate instruction manual" and animations that "help sell the immersion". Reviewers also discussed the gameplay mechanics and challenge. Describing the game as "oddly compelling", Matt Wales of Eurogamer stated that it "builds an impressive amount of variety from a relatively limited number of visual elements". Maddy Myers of Polygon considered the game to not always be intuitive, but to feature "just the right amount of challenge". Wes Fenlon of PC Gamer stated that the game did not have "much challenge" as the player could easily escape The Monsta, but "was impressed by the variety of puzzle interactions given the simplistic controls".
