= Push Me Pull You (disambiguation) =

Push Me Pull You is a 2016 video game. It may also refer to:

- Pushmi-Pullyu, a character from the children's book series Doctor Dolittle
- Push Me, Pull You (Thomas & Friends), a 2008 episode from the children's television series Thomas & Friends
