= Panic Inc. =

American software company and video game publisher

- Type: Private
- Industry: Software; Video games; Consumer electronics
- Founded: 1997
- Founders: Steven Frank; Cabel Sasser
- Headquarters: Portland, Oregon, U.S.
- Key people: Steven Frank; Cabel Sasser
- Products: Transmit, Coda, Playdate
- Website: panic.com

Panic Inc. is an American software development and video game publishing company based in Portland, Oregon. The company specializes in macOS and iOS applications and began publishing video games in 2016.

Panic was founded by Steven Frank and Cabel Sasser in 1997.

== Products ==
=== Software ===
Panic is known for its flagship app Transmit, as well as its Audion media player, Unison Usenet client, and Nova code editor (a successor to their web development app Coda). The company has won multiple Apple Design Awards for its products.

In 1999, Audion was introduced as a skinnable MP3 media player. One of its competitors, SoundJam MP, was acquired by Apple in 2000 and was further developed into iTunes 1.0, which became available in 2001. Panic retired Audion in 2004 and began distributing it free of charge.

After Audion, Panic focused development on two other software applications. In 2004, they released Unison, a Usenet reader, and Stattoo, a tool that shows "digital statistics" overlaid on the Mac OS X desktop wallpaper. In 2007, the web development application Coda was introduced. In 2019, Panic announced a successor to Coda named Nova.

App	Platform	Type	Ref.
Active development
Transmit	macOS	FTP client	
Nova	macOS	Web development	
Prompt	iOS	Command line	
Panic Pals	iOS	iMessage stickers	
Playdate Sticker Pack	iOS	iMessage stickers	
Discontinued
“Code Editor”	iOS	Web development	
Audion	macOS	Music player	
CandyBar	macOS	Icon customization	
Coda	macOS	Web development	
Desktastic	macOS	Desktop annotation	
Stattoo	macOS	Computer statistics	
Status Board	iOS	Information display	
Transmit	iOS	FTP client	
Unison	macOS	Usenet client	

=== Video games ===
The company published their first video game, Firewatch, on February 9, 2016. Panic published their second game, Untitled Goose Game, on September 20, 2019.

Title	Platform(s)	Developer	Release date	Ref.
Firewatch	PC (Windows, macOS, Linux), PlayStation 4, Xbox One, Nintendo Switch	Campo Santo	9 February 2016	
Untitled Goose Game	PC (Windows, macOS), PlayStation 4, Xbox One, Nintendo Switch	House House	20 September 2019	
Nour: Play with Your Food	PC (Windows, macOS), PlayStation 4, PlayStation 5, Nintendo Switch	Terrifying Jellyfish	12 September 2023	
Thank Goodness You're Here!	PC (Windows and macOS), PlayStation 4, PlayStation 5, Nintendo Switch, Xbox Series X/S	Coal Supper	1 August 2024	
Arco	PC (Windows, macOS), Nintendo Switch	Franek Nowotniak, Max Cahill, José Ramón “Bibiki” García, Antonio “Fáyer” Uribe	15 August 2024	
Despelote	PC (Windows), PlayStation 4, PlayStation 5, Xbox One, Xbox Series X/S, Nintendo Switch	Julián Cordero, Sebastian Valbuena	1 May 2025	
Time Flies	PC (Windows, macOS), PlayStation 5, Nintendo Switch	Playables	31 July 2025	
Herdling	PC (Windows), PlayStation 5, Xbox Series X/S, Nintendo Switch, Nintendo Switch 2	Okomotive	Windows, PS5, Xbox Series X/S, Switch; 21 August 2025; Switch2; 12 November 2026	
Blippo+	Playdate, PC (Windows), Nintendo Switch	Yacht, Telefantasy Studios, Dustin Mierau, Noble Robot	Playdate; 9 May 2025; Windows, Switch; 23 September 2025	
Ratcheteer DX	PC (Windows, macOS), Nintendo Switch	Shaun Inman	5 March 2026	
Big Walk	PC (Windows, macOS), PlayStation 5, Nintendo Switch 2	House House	4 August 2026	

=== Playdate ===
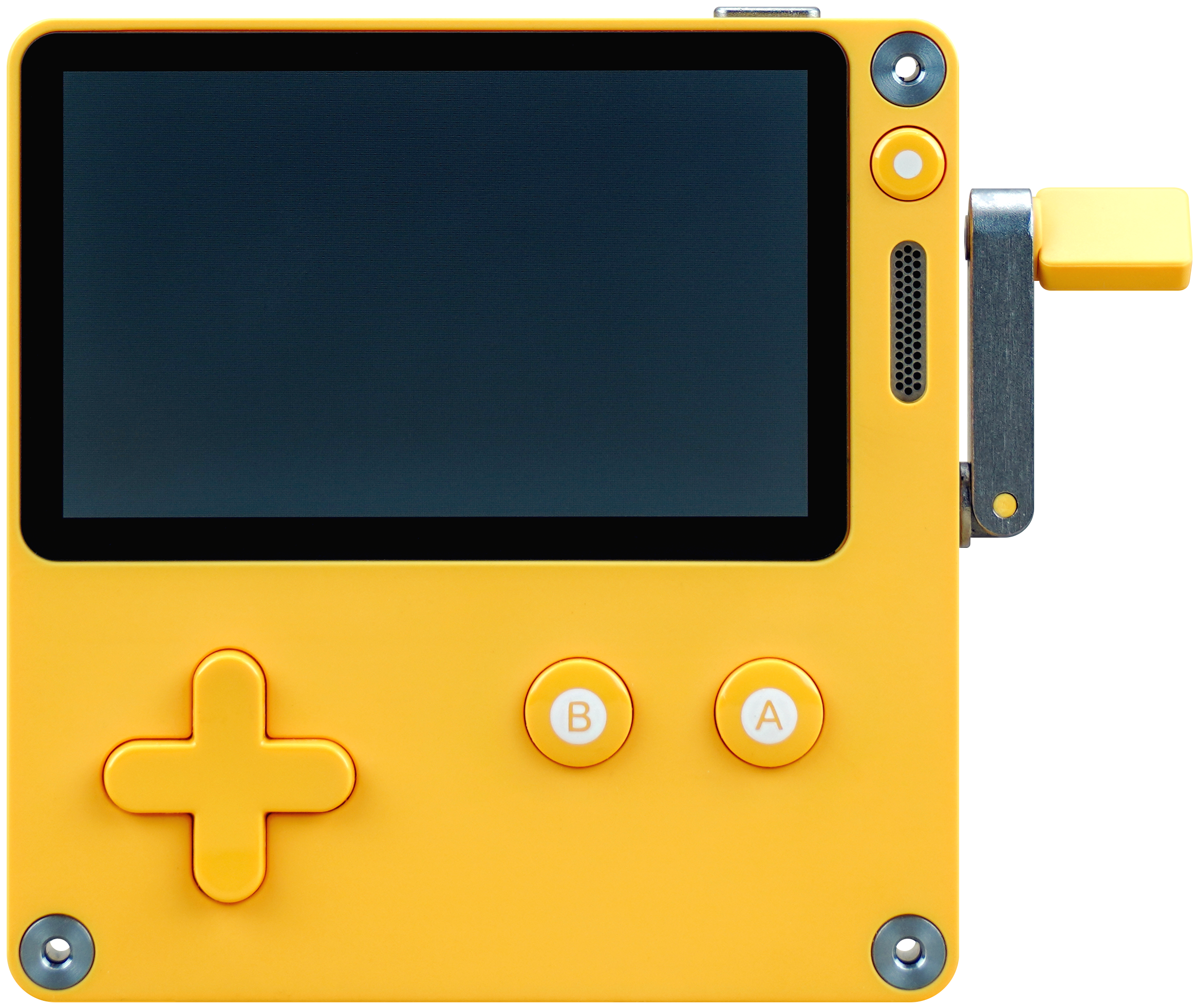
Playdate console with the crank in an open position

On May 22, 2019, Panic unveiled Playdate, a handheld gaming device, designed by Panic in collaboration with the Swedish firm Teenage Engineering. The device features a 400x240 pixel 1-bit screen, a directional pad on the left, two buttons on the right, and a mechanical crank on the right edge of the device.

Games on Playdate are released in "seasons", where there are two new games each week, automatically downloaded to the device when available. Also, there is a store of additional games to buy on demand, the ability to sideload games to the device, and two environments to self develop games. While some video games for Playdate are being produced at Panic, most of the games are created by indie game developers such as Keita Takahashi, Zach Gage, Bennett Foddy, Shaun Inman, and Lucas Pope.

== Awards ==
Year	App	Award	Category	Result	Ref.
2003	Transmit 2	Apple Design Awards	Best Mac OS X User Experience	Runner-up	
2004	Unison 1.0.2a	Apple Design Awards	Best Mac OS X Product	Runner-up	
2004	Unison 1.0.2a	Apple Design Awards	Best Mac OS X User Experience	Won	
2005	Transmit 3	MacWorld	MacWorld Best of Show	Won	
2005	Transmit 3.2	Apple Design Awards	Best Mac OS X Tiger Technology Adoption	Won	
2007	Coda 1	Apple Design Awards	Best Mac OS X User Experience	Won	
2013	Coda 2	Apple Design Awards	Mac OS X	Won	
2021	Nova	Apple Design Awards	Interaction	Nominated	
2025	Thank Goodness You're Here!	Apple Design Awards	Delight and Fun	Nominated	
