= Welcome To The Dark Place =

- Developer: Zeekerss
- Publisher: Zeekerss
- Platform: Windows
- Release: October 24, 2025
- Genre: Adventure game
- Mode: Single-player

Welcome To The Dark Place is a single-player text-based psychological horror video game developed and published by Zeekerss for Windows via Steam. It was first released in October 2025.

== Development ==
The game was first announced in 2019, with some early gameplay trailers being released around the same time. In September 2024, Zeekerss announced that development was continuing on the game, following the success of Lethal Company. It was officially released in October 2025 for free on Steam.

== Gameplay ==
The gameplay consists mostly of selecting text options to move through the world, interact with the environment and other beings, and react to events. The bulk of the game is spent exploring an expansive game world by moving in the four cardinal directions—North, South, East, and West—in steps. Because of the large size of the explorable area and the difficulty of navigating through it by text, the game encourages the player to draw a map while playing, either physically or by using the game's built-in map-drawing feature. In the absence of visuals, sound is the main sensory element used, reflecting the noise of the environment surrounding the player and allowing the player to "Listen." when in tense situations or before opening doors.

The main objective is to escape from the "Dark Place." The game has many "endings," most of which result in the death or presumed death of the protagonist.
