= Dan Golding =

Australian academic, composer and writer

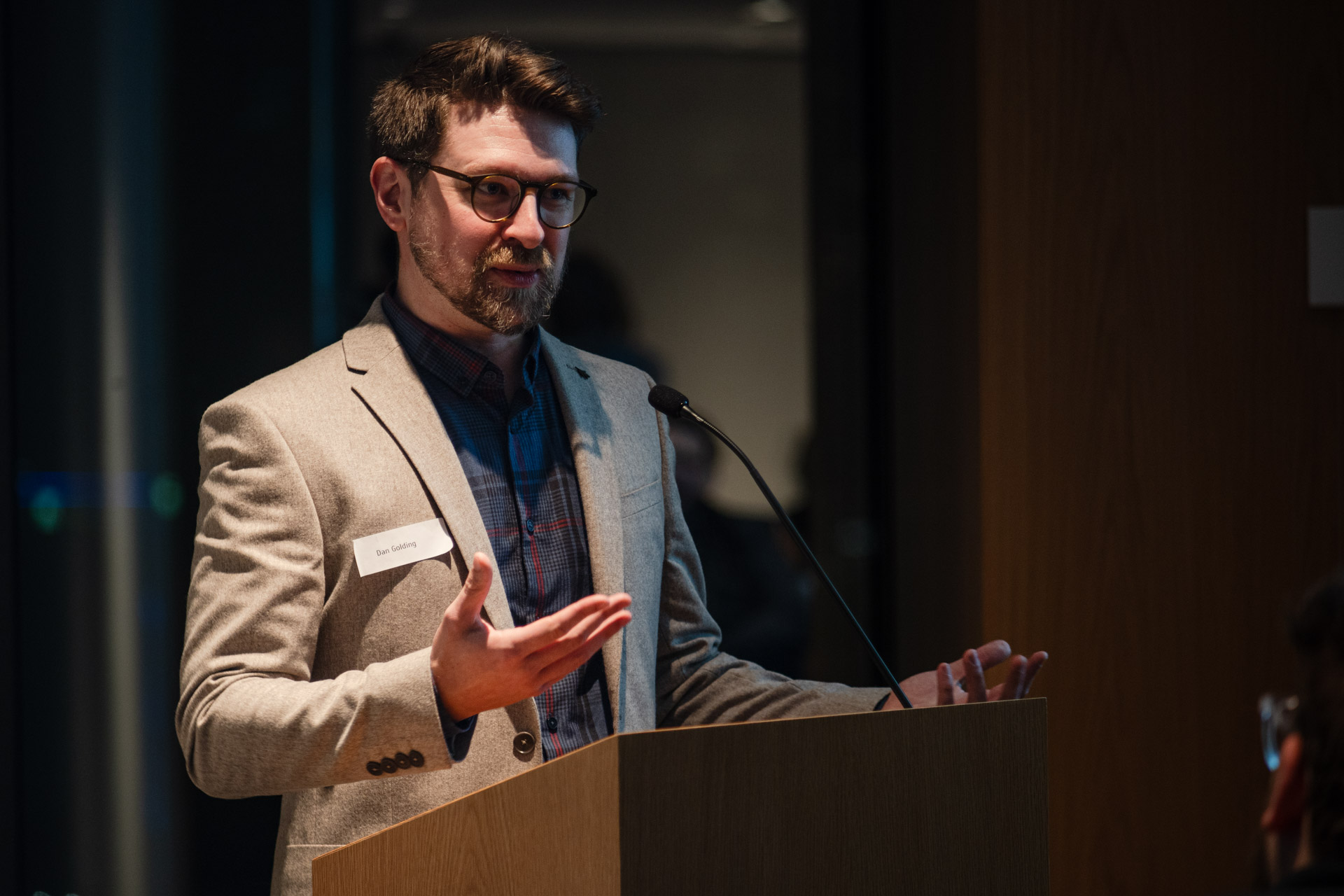
- Golding speaks at the launch of the Melbourne Press Club's 2024 Mentoring Program

Background information
- Born: Daniel Golding; Melbourne, Victoria, Australia
- Occupations: Composer, academic, writer
- Years active: 2016–present
- Website: dangolding.com

Daniel "Dan" Golding is an Australian writer, composer, broadcaster and academic.

== Early life and education ==
Golding holds a PhD from the University of Melbourne.

== Academic career ==
As of 2025 Golding is Professor and Chair of Media and Communication at Swinburne University of Technology in Hawthorn, Victoria.

== Writing ==
Golding is the author of Star Wars After Lucas, and the co-author of Game Changers. Golding and his work has been featured on The Conversation, BoingBoing, Australian Broadcasting Corporation, and in Wired. His 2019 book, Star Wars after Lucas: A Critical Guide to the Future of the Galaxy, was reviewed on The Verge and in Leonard. As a writer, Golding won "the Lizzie" for Best Games Journalist at the 11th Annual IT Journalism Awards for work published with Crikey.

== Music ==
Golding is the creator of the soundtracks for Untitled Goose Game, The Haunted Island, and Push Me Pull You. His soundtrack for The Haunted Island won the APRA AMCOS award for best music at the 2019 Australian Game Developer Awards. Untitled Goose Game was nominated for audio awards at the 2020 Independent Games Festival Awards, the Game Developers Choice Awards, and the British Academy Games Awards.

In March 2020, Golding's soundtrack album for Untitled Goose Game was released by House House and Universal Music Australia. In 2022, Orchestra Victoria performed his music for Untitled Goose Game, dynamically responding live to gameplay. In 2023, the Australian federal government's National Cultural Policy cited the performance as bringing "together multiple genres and art forms and new audiences."

Golding was the director of Australia's Freeplay Independent Games Festival from 2014 to 2017, and from 2006 to 2009 was a member of the Dili Allstars.

== Broadcasting ==
Golding is the host of the weekly Screen Sounds program on ABC Classic radio. He is a co-host of the Art of the Score podcast. He has created video essays about film music, including A Theory of Film Music in response to a video by Every Frame a Painting. The dialogue between the two was described by Fandor as "an extraordinary case study in how popular video essayists and academically trained scholars can bring out the best from each other".

In 2015, Golding presented A Short History of Videogames, a four-part documentary series for ABC Radio National. With Linda Marigliano, Golding co-hosted the documentary series What Is Music for ABC Television and Triple J.

== Works ==
=== Videogame soundtracks ===
| Year | Title | Details | Awards |
|---|---|---|---|
| 2016 | Push Me Pull You | Developer: House House | |
| 2018 | Frog Detective 1: The Haunted Island | Developer: Worm Club | APRA AMCOS Australian Game Developer Award for Best Music (won) |
| 2019 | Untitled Goose Game | Developer: House House Label: Decca (Universal Music Australia) on digital, iam8bit on vinyl | Best Original Soundtrack, Cast or Show Album (nominated) APRA AMCOS Australian Game Developer Award for Best Music (nominated) |
| 2019 | Frog Detective 2: The Case of the Invisible Wizard | Developer: Worm Club Publisher: Super Hot | |
| 2022 | Brendan Keogh's Putting Challenge | Developer: Brendan Keogh Publisher: Paper House Games | |
| 2022 | Frog Detective 3: Corruption at Cowboy County | Developer: Worm Club Publisher: Super Hot | APRA AMCOS Australian Game Developer Award for Best Music (nominated) |
| 2023 | Mars First Logistics | Developer: Shape Shop | |

=== Books ===
| Year | Title | Publisher | ISBN |
|---|---|---|---|
| 2016 | Game Changers: From Minecraft to Misogyny, the Fight for the Future of Videogames | Affirm Press | 9781925344509 |
| 2019 | Star Wars After Lucas: A Critical Guide to the Future of the Galaxy | University of Minnesota Press | 9781517905422 |
