= Transmit (file transfer tool) =

macOS file transfer application

- Developer: Panic
- Stable release: 5.11.5 / February 12, 2026; 48 days ago
- Operating system: macOS
- Type: File transfer tool
- License: Proprietary
- Website: www.panic.com/transmit

Transmit is a file transfer client program for macOS developed by Panic Inc. Transmit is trialware; after a seven-day trial period, the product can only be used for seven-minute sessions until it is purchased. Transmit was originally built as an FTP client but now supports a number of protocols including SFTP, WebDAV, and Amazon S3 and cloud services including Google Drive, Dropbox, and OneDrive.

The app was called "Transit" at introduction in 1998, but had to be changed due to a conflict with an existing product. Transmit was originally developed for Classic Mac OS, but that version has been discontinued and made freeware.

Transmit for iOS was released in 2014 but removed and retired from the Apple app store in 2018.

== History ==
On February 16, 2005, Transmit 3 was released. The app was previewed to attendees of Macworld Expo the month prior in January 2005.

On April 27, 2010, Transmit 4 was released. The app was almost completely rewritten, had a brand new interface, over 45 new features, and was up to 25 times faster. Transmit 4 supported iDisk and the former Dashboard. It also introduced the ability to mount servers as disks in Finder, but this feature was later removed in Transmit 5.6.

On June 10, 2016, Panic began beta testing Transmit 5, touting improved performance and new features. Transmit 5 was released the following year on July 18, 2017.

== Awards ==
Transmit is the recipient of a number of awards, including:

- Apple Design Award, 2005 for "best Mac OS X Tiger technology adoption, for its use of features like Automator, Mac sync, Spotlight, Dashboard and more."
- MacWorld Expo Best of Show (among 12 winners), 2005
