= Meccha Chameleon =

2026 multiplayer video game

- Steam header
- Developers: Lemorion_1224; Haganeiro
- Engine: Unreal Engine 5
- Platforms: Windows; Nintendo Switch 2
- Release: Windows: WW: June 10, 2026; Nintendo Switch 2: WW: September 9, 2026
- Genres: Casual, friendslop
- Mode: Multiplayer

Meccha Chameleon (Note: Japanese: めっちゃカメレオン, Hepburn: Metcha Kamereon; stylized in all caps; lit. 'Super Chameleon') is a multiplayer casual video game developed by Japanese indie game developers Lemorion_1224 and Haganeiro. It was released for Windows on June 10, 2026, and for Nintendo Switch 2 on September 9, 2026. Players control white bipedal characters playing the role of hunters or chameleons. The chameleons can paint themselves to match their surroundings and hide from the hunters, while the hunters must find all the chameleons before time expires.

Meccha Chameleon was developed in two months. It received positive reviews upon release, praising its gameplay. It won the Movement Award at the 2026 Japan Game Awards and won the most awards, alongside Resident Evil Requiem, in the 2026 Golden Joystick Awards. It was a commercial success, selling more than 20 million copies by August 2026 and reaching a peak of over 340,000 concurrent players on Steam. It has been described as one of the fastest and best-selling video game of 2026, and its popularity was credited to its low base price and word-of-mouth marketing. It also spawned various clones. The developers released maps in collaboration with Japanese YouTuber Hikakin and indie games such as Garten of Banban and The Exit 8.

== Gameplay ==
A player in "infection" mode trying to hide as a balloon, with various tools on the left side

Meccha Chameleon is a hide-and-seek video game where players play as white bipedal player characters who are split into two groups, hunters and chameleons. Hunters need to find chameleons, while chameleons hide and blend into their surroundings by painting their characters. Chameleons can hide as a blobby, cubic character,, Macho, Octopus, or Polygon, and either as a petite (half the normal size), normal,, or plump (twice the normal size) character.

The player can use different coloring tools, such as a color picker and an eyedropper, and choose different poses, such as curling up or lying down. The chameleons can also create clones or select different sizes of the chosen character shape to help them hide. The hunters must find the chameleons before the timer runs out.

The game features four modes: Infection, where a chameleon becomes a hunter upon being caught; Double, where everyone hides in the beginning, then everyone hunts, so whoever finds the most people, or finds everyone first, wins;, Reverse Chicken Race, where each player is given time to paint themselves. After the timer ends, each player's paint job is displayed on a pedestal, and hunters try to find the player after the observation time ends, and Team Battle, where the player team up and take turns as the hider and seeker.

Chameleons can taunt hunters by producing a whistling sound, which helps the hunters locate the hiders. There is a setting called forced taunting that forces a taunt after a certain period. The chameleons can use a free camera mode to explore the map or spectate the hunter.

The game has both public and private lobbies. Lobbies support up to 24 players, depending on the internet connection of the host, and the recommended number of players is 2 to 12. The official map list includes Hide-and-Seek Mansion, Indoor Country, Sewer, Backrooms, Penguin Hotel, Sugarland, and Osaka. Custom maps can be played by installing mods from the Steam Workshop, such as Art Gallery, The Market, Swimming pool!, and Viking Market.

== Development ==
Meccha Chameleon was developed by Japanese indie game developer Lemorion_1224 with the help of Haganeiro. The two previously developed games for Fortnite using Epic Games' Unreal Editor for Fortnite before moving to Steam. Lemorion's other games include the Penguin Hotel series and Link Penguins.

The game was conceived after the two developers played various Fortnite games with hide-and-seek style mechanics. The game was Lemorion's idea after he remembered an artist on television painting themselves to blend into the surroundings. He handled the development of graphics, planning, background music, models, and maps, while Haganeiro handled system management and effects. Components and assets are reused, including the back-end systems, from Penguin Hotel and Link Penguins.

The game was created in two months, but counting the development of the reused assets, the total development period lasted four to five months. It was developed on Unreal Engine, and uses Epic Games' Epic Online Services, a free multiplayer networking tool, for matchmaking purposes. According to Lemorion, the Hide-and-Seek Mansion map took the most time in development, while the entire development of modeling and designing the locale lasted one month.

According to Lemorion, they focused on "avoiding complex controls for the user" (ユーザーに複雑な操作を要求しない) and "ensuring the system itself did not become overly complicated" (複雑なシステムにしない). A two-hour play test was performed by 100 randomly selected users from various countries. Following the feedback from the play test, the two added three more maps two weeks before release.

== Release ==
Meccha Chameleon was announced on May 15, 2026, and released on Windows via Steam on June 10, 2026. It was made available on the cloud gaming service GeForce Now on June 27. Two weeks after its release, Lemorion started work on porting it to Nintendo Switch 2. Meccha Chameleon was released for Nintendo Switch 2 on September 9, following a Nintendo Direct announcement.

=== Malware incident ===
On July 23, an independent researcher named Feint posted a report that a Steam Workshop map titled "Laser Tag Neon" contained a remote access trojan. According to Feint, the investigation started because a friend had briefly seen a command prompt window open while downloading the map. The map was quickly removed, although other maps were uploaded to replace it, such as "Chroma Grid Arena". The game itself contained no malware; although some of the maps contained within the Steam Workshop were malicious.

On July 25, Lemorion confirmed the official Meccha Chameleon Discord server had been hacked. He later clarified the malicious Workshop item had infected the computer of a system engineer who was trying to patch the vulnerability. This let the hackers bypass two-factor authentication and ban all of the server staff. The server was restored less than a day later.

On July 26, the 3.1.0 update was released to fix bugs and patch out the aforementioned vulnerability. According to the development team, the patch removed the ability for maps to execute unrelated files, such as the malware that the malicious Steam Workshop maps had contained.

== Marketing ==
On July 11, 2026, the map "HIKAKIN Museum" was added as a collaboration with the Japanese YouTuber Hikakin. It features various games decoration related to Hikakin and Seikin. The map "Banban's Kindergarten" was added on July 25 as a collaboration with the video game Garten of Banban. On July 28, Lemorion announced on X a collaboration with the 2023 video game The Exit 8, adding the "Exit 8" map on August 1 based on the underpass from The Exit 8.

== Reception ==
Reception

Review scores
Publication	Score
IGN	8/10
PC Gamer (US)	82/100

Meccha Chameleon was described by Sam Woods of TheGamer as "2026's biggest viral sensation", while Elie Gould of PC Gamer praised its gameplay that gave it the potential to "become one of the giants in [the friendslop] genre". Edwin Evans-Thirlwell of Rock Paper Shotgun said that "one of the game's loveliest qualities is that, strictly speaking, you don't need to play it to play it."

It was described as one of the fastest and best-selling game of 2026, outselling games like Resident Evil Requiem, Forza Horizon 6, and Crimson Desert. It debuted in first place on the Japanese Steam sales charts, beating Forza Horizon 6 and Final Fantasy VII Remake Intergrade. It reached second place on the global Steam sales chart. By August 11, it was estimated by Inven Global to have earned around US$119 million. On its release day, it received 20,000 concurrent players on Steam and by June 15, it had over 90,000 concurrent players. Its all-time peak was over 340,535 players on June 22, making it the 44th most concurrently played game in Steam's history.

Despite not spending on marketing, Meccha Chameleon gained significant traction on social media due to various viral short-form videos and content from streamers, as well as its low base price and word-of-mouth marketing. Seungjin Kang of Inven Global described it as popular on streaming platforms, saying that its "high-quality, novel art and camouflage mechanics have resonated with live-streaming audiences". By July 27, it surpassed 18 million hours of viewing time on Twitch. As of August 14, Meccha Chameleon had a "Very Positive" rating on Steam from over 73,000 reviews. Fans also recreated the game's character by 3D printing and placing it in random public places in real life. Google also added an easter egg where when searching for the game on both Japanese and English on Google Search, the blob figure will show up hiding around the page.

Due to its popularity, Meccha Chameleon spawned various clone games such as Scribble Hunt, whose Korean name (메챠 카멜레온; mecha kamelleon) translates to "Meccha Chameleon". Another one is the iOS game Chameleon Kakurenbo - chameleon online (カメレオンかくれんぼ - chameleon online), which is a 2D clone of Meccha Chameleon developed by Taishi Nakai. It also spawned various Roblox clones such as [BACKROOMS] Chameleon and Paint Or Seek, which received nearly 50,000 and 37,000 concurrent players, respectively. Additionally, its popularity led to various conspiracy theories, such as claims that the developers paid streamers before Meccha Chameleon's release to boost popularity and claims that the developers are funded by wealthy backers, pointing out the cost of running servers for more than 200 thousand simultaneous players. Haganeiro dismissed the rumors, adding that Meccha Chameleon uses Epic Games' Epic Online Services for its hosting needs.

=== Sales ===
Meccha Chameleon sold 500,000 copies in the first two days after release. On August 12, it reached 20 million copies sold. Game producer Taira Nakamura of Sega, commenting on two million copies sold in five days despite having no promotion, called it an "unthinkable achievement for the game industry and game companies". The Nintendo Switch 2 port sold over 100,000 copies on its release date. It sold 300,000 copies by September 16.

== Accolades ==
Meccha Chameleon won multiple awards. It won the Movement Award in the Japan Game Awards 2026. It won two categories at the Thailand Game Awards 2026. It won the most awards, alongside Resident Evil Requiem, at the 2026 Golden Joystick Awards, winning Best Multiplayer Game, Best Indie Game - Self-Published, Streamers' Choice Award, and Developers' Choice Award; it was the first indie game to have won four categories in the award's history.

Year	Ceremony	Category	Result	Ref.
2026	Japan Game Awards	Movement Award	Won	
2026	Thailand Game Awards	Best Multiplayer Game	Won	
2026	Thailand Game Awards	Best Indie Game	Won	
2026	Golden Joystick Awards	Best Indie Game – Self-published	Won	
2026	Golden Joystick Awards	Best Multiplayer Game	Won	
2026	Golden Joystick Awards	Streamer's Choice	Won	
2026	Golden Joystick Awards	Developer's Choice	Won	
2026	Golden Joystick Awards	PC Game of the Year	Nominated	
2026	The Streamer Awards	Stream Game of the Year	Won	
2026	The Game Awards	Best Multiplayer Game	Pending	

== See also ==
- List of best-selling PC games
- Prop Hunt
