= Zeekerss =

American video game developer (born 2002)

- Born: March 2, 2002 (age 24)
- Occupation: Video game developer
- Notable work: Lethal Company; Welcome To The Dark Place

Zeekerss (born March 2, 2002) is an American video game developer who is best known for his work on Lethal Company. He began developing games on Roblox, prior to working on games for the Windows platform.

== Career ==
Zeekerss began his game development career on the online video game platform Roblox in 2012. He then began creating games for Itch.io and Steam. He released It Steals, his first game on Steam, in July 2020. It is a single-player horror game that was also released on Itch.io for $5. He released The Upturned, a comedy horror game, in March 2022.

=== Lethal Company ===
On October 23, 2023, Zeekerss released Lethal Company in early access. The first-person horror game was an immediate success, becoming one of the most successful games of 2023. Zeekerss first announced the game on his Patreon in 2022. In August 2023, he began small playtests of the game, before its eventual release in October. By March 2024, the game had sold an estimated 9.4 million copies. He continued to update the game, with one major update introducing vehicles to the game. After the release of R.E.P.O., a game described as similar to Lethal Company, Zeekerss stated that he was inspired to continue work on the game. He released the update, version 70, in June 2025.

=== Welcome To The Dark Place ===
Zeekerss began work on Welcome To The Dark Place in 2019. He announced that he would be taking a temporary break from Lethal Company in September 2024. He released the game on October 24, 2025.

== Ludography ==
Year	Title	Platform(s)	Ref.
2020	It Steals	Windows	
2021	Dead Seater	Windows	
2022	The Upturned	Windows	
2023	Lethal Company	Windows	
2025	Welcome To The Dark Place	Windows	
