= Time Flies (video game) =

2025 video game

- Developer: Playables
- Publisher: Panic
- Platforms: Windows, Mac, Nintendo Switch, PlayStation 5
- Release: 31 July 2025
- Genre: Adventure
- Mode: Single-player

Time Flies is a 2025 video game developed by Playables and published by Panic. It is a puzzle and adventure video game in which players must complete a bucket list of activities in the lifespan of a housefly against a time limit for each level. The time limit length in seconds is adjusted by players' self-selected countries of origin, correlating to the years of the average human lifetime in that country. The game was developed by Swiss designer and animator Michael Frei and programmer Raphaël Munoz, who expressed interest in creating a game based on interesting bucket lists. Upon release, the game received positive reviews, with critics praising its themes of life and death as impactful and humorous, and enjoyed its visual design and gameplay objectives, although several critiqued its short length.

== Gameplay ==
Gameplay screenshot, showing a phonograph that players can interact with as a fly by landing upon.

Playing as a housefly, the objective of Time Flies is to complete the items of a bucket list within the fly's lifespan. All items on the list must be completed; when the time limit elapses, the fly dies and the items reset. The game features four levels, with players required to complete all tasks to progress to the next level. The level ends if the timer lapses, or players die from an environmental hazard. Objectives are given vague names, including 'Get Rich', 'Start a Revolution', or 'Go With The Flow', requiring players to explore the level and experiment with objects to identify how to complete them. Players begin a level by selecting a country, and are given a fixed amount of seconds to complete the level, corresponding with the life expectancy of the selected country according to World Health Organization data. Clocks are placed throughout levels, allowing for additional seconds of time by rewinding the hands. Players control the fly using the arrow keys, and physically interact with the game world by bouncing off, landing, or walking on objects. When players hover close to items they can interact with, the camera zooms in on this object, and the timer pauses. Twelve puzzle pieces are hidden throughout the game for players to collect.

== Development and release ==
Time Flies was developed by independent developer Playables, the studio of Michael Frei and Mario von Rickenbach, in collaboration with programmer Raphaël Munoz from Aprobado Studio. The game is the first from the studio to involve traditional gameplay mechanics and goals, after creating several games including Plug & Play in 2015 and Kids in 2019. Development began during the COVID-19 pandemic, with Frei stating the game's concept emerged from "thinking about what we wanted to do with our lives once we'd emerged from our rooms". Several concepts were explored, including a platform video game and browser game, instead focusing on designing a "very simple game" with minimal input to reflect how a fly would interact with the world. The concept of gameplay affected by life expectancy arose as Frei monitored World Health Organization data to understand the impact of the pandemic. The designers researched the concept of bucket lists and what people place on them, designing the game world around the most interesting items they found on those people's lists. The visual design, hand-drawn by Frei on a mouse and laptop trackpad, was based on the Macintosh title Glider, the first game Frei ever played. The game's sound was sourced from audio libraries from previous projects and recording and sharing sounds using Zoom.

Playable announced Time Flies at the Double Fine Day of the Devs digital showcase in June 2022, alongside the release of an announcement trailer. The game's release was announced with a trailer in July 2025, which occurred on 31 July of that year for Nintendo Switch, PlayStation 5, and PC.

== Reception ==
Reception

Aggregate scores
Aggregator	Score	
Aggregator	NS	PS5
Metacritic	80/100	74/100
OpenCritic	76% recommend (Note: Based on 25 reviews)	76% recommend (Note: Based on 25 reviews)

Review scores
Publication	Score	
Publication	NS	PS5
Game Informer	7.25/10	
Nintendo Life	8/10	
Nintendo World Report	9/10	
Push Square		7/10
The Guardian	4/5	4/5
PlayStation Universe		8.5/10
Siliconera	7/10	

Time Flies received a nomination for the best "Bite-Sized Game" at the 2025 Indie Game Awards. The game received "generally favorable" reviews, according to review aggregator website Metacritic. Fellow review aggregator OpenCritic assessed that the game received strong approval, being recommended by 76% of critics. Critics found poignancy in the game's themes around life and death, with several describing the game as personally affecting or existential in nature. Although acknowledging the game could be interpreted as nihilistic, Giovanni Colantonio of Polygon found the game's tone as optimistic and life-affirming, stating it was about "being undeterred by life's limitations". Sarah Thwaites of The Guardian similarly stated that "many of us will struggle to achieve some of the fly's loftier ambitions, unless we reorient what those ambitions mean to us – something that Time Flies insists we contemplate". The Verge praised the game's inclusion of sincere objectives as personally relevant and emotionally impactful.

The gameplay objectives and tone of Time Flies were also praised. Nile Bowie of Nintendo Life enjoyed the "distinctive comedic tone" of the tasks, saying that their open-ended nature allowed players to "poke around and figure things out on [their] own". Similarly, Stephen Talby of Push Square found the tasks to have "slapstick comedic value" and lead to "surreal and hilarious outcomes", finding the stages showcased "lots of fun little interactions" with objects in the level. Willem Hilhorst of Nintendo World Report considered the addition of "little tricks and secrets" to the gameplay", as well as puzzle pieces and achievements, to offer replayability. The visual design of Time Flies also met positive reception, with many critics highlighting its minimalist and monochrome qualities. Tony Colton of PlayStation Universe highlighted the game's attention to detail, stating that the game's animation "really sells the authenticity of traversing the world as a fly". However, several critics expressed disappointment at the game's short length, as it can be beaten within two hours. Although considering the game did not overstay its welcome, Brian Shea of Game Informer lamented "the experience was over just as I started feeling at home with the mechanics and puzzle conventions".
