= RV There Yet? =

2025 video game

- Developer: Nuggets Entertainment
- Publisher: Nuggets Entertainment
- Engine: Unreal Engine
- Platforms: Windows; Xbox Series X/S; Nintendo Switch 2; PlayStation 5
- Release: Windows; October 21, 2025; Xbox Series X/S; June 30, 2026; PS5, Switch 2; October 29, 2026
- Genres: Action, adventure, indie
- Modes: Single-player, multiplayer

RV There Yet? is a cooperative adventure video game developed and published by Nuggets Entertainment, a Swedish game studio. It was released for Windows on October 21, 2025, and gained popularity on the Steam storefront. The game was later released on Xbox Series X/S and Windows via the Microsoft Store on June 30, 2026, and for Nintendo Switch 2 and PlayStation 5 on October 29, 2026.

In RV There Yet?, players control a rear wheel drive RV and attempt to navigate it through challenging terrain while returning from a camping trip. Players face various obstacles such as bears that damage the RV and hurt players.

== Development ==
The game was developed using Unreal Engine by the Swedish studio Nuggets Entertainment, based in Skövde, Sweden. The name "RV There Yet?" is a pun on the saying "Are we there yet?" RV There Yet? began as a game jam project in the summer of 2025. Following the game jam, it was expanded into a full release, retaining its chaotic physics-based cooperative gameplay and humorous “dad-core” aesthetic.

== Reception ==
Reception

Aggregate score
| Aggregator | Score |
|---|---|
| Metacritic | 72/100 |

In the first week of release, RV There Yet? sold 1.3 million copies. In December 2025, the game surpassed 4.5 million copies.

RV There Yet? received "mixed or average" reviews from critics, according to the review aggregation website Metacritic. Gamereactor described RV There Yet? as more than a conventional game, calling it "a metaphor for… the road that never ends, the repetition, the lack of direction." The review highlighted the game's viral appeal and unique humor, noting that it reflects contemporary players’ fascination with watching chaotic journeys unfold rather than reaching a destination. The reviewer concluded that while the game lacks a clear objective, it succeeds in creating a memorable, engaging experience.

== Awards and nominations ==
| Year | Award | Category | Result | Ref. |
|---|---|---|---|---|
| 2025 | The Steam Awards 2025 | Sit Back and Relax | Won | |

== See also ==
- Friendslop
