= Helsing's Fire =

2010 video game

- Developer: Ratloop
- Publisher: Clickgamer.com
- Platform: iOS
- Release: iPhone; July 10, 2010 iPad; December 15, 2010
- Genre: Puzzle
- Mode: Single-player

Helsing's Fire is a 2010 puzzle video game developed by Ratloop and published by Clickgamer.com. The protagonist, monster hunter Van Helsing, and his assistant Raffton battle Dracula and his minions by revealing monsters using a torch and defeating them with tonics. Developed over the course of 6 months by Ratloop co-founder Lucas Pope and programmer Keiko Ishizaka, the game was originally designed to be a roguelike action game, but eventually turned into a puzzler.

The game was released in 2010 for iOS. It was reviewed positively by critics, who praised the game's torch/tonic puzzle mechanic, visuals, and dialogue between Van Helsing and Raffton; reception towards the game's difficulty was mixed. The game won the "Best Mobile Game" award at the 2011 Independent Games Festival.

== Gameplay ==
Helsing's Fire is a puzzle video game with a top-down perspective, set in London. The protagonist, monster hunter Van Helsing, and his assistant Raffton battle Dracula and his minions using torches and magical tonics. In each level, the player must reveal monsters using their torch while avoiding blocks and walls that obstruct the torch's rays of light. Once revealed, monsters can be defeated by using tonics corresponding to their color (red, blue, or green). Monsters are initially immobile, but gain the ability to move and shoot back at the player in later stages. Different monsters impact gameplay: for example, a werewolf hit by a tonic turns into a maiden, who the player should avoid harming.

The game contains three campaigns with 180 stages in total as well as boss battles; later stages increase in difficulty. The puzzles in the levels are randomly generated. Players are scored by how fast they complete the level. Helsing's Fire has two additional modes besides the campaigns: a "Bounties" mode, and an endless mode where the player completes as many timed puzzles as possible before either running out of time or failing to complete a puzzle.

Even when you could play Helsing’s Fire on your iPad, Until 10 July 2010, Helsing’s Fire had had an HD version of the game (called Helsing’s Fire HD). The gameplay is the same with the exception of the display being optimised for iPads, unlike the original version.

== Development ==
Helsing's Fire was developed by Ratloop co-founder Lucas Pope and programmer Keiko Ishizaka, his wife. The game was developed by them over the course of 6 months part-time, with additional work for updates and an HD version. The game was originally a roguelike action game; Pope said that he "had a much easier time designing the puzzle elements" and that Helsing's Fire eventually turned into a puzzler. The developers then focused on the vampire theme, then on Helsing and Raffton, the game's characters. Pope had been creating app prototypes to familiarize himself with the iPhone SDK; the light/shadow concept arose from his prototyping work. He initially wanted to simplify the art creation by using vector-like graphics, but added textures and hand-drawn sprites after feedback from friends.

The game was released on July 10, 2010 for iPhone and was published by Clickgamer.com, a subsidiary of Chillingo. A post-launch update added a new campaign (in addition to the original 90 stages), a new partner for Helsing, and new items.

== Reception ==
Reception

Aggregate score
Aggregator	Score
Metacritic	83/100

Review scores
Publication	Score
The A.V. Club	A−
Edge	7/10
Eurogamer	9/10
GamePro	5/5
Gamezebo	3/5
GameZone	8.5/10
IGN	7/10
Pocket Gamer	3.5/5
TouchArcade	5/5
Common Sense Media	5/5

Helsing's Fire received "favorable" reviews according to the review aggregator Metacritic. Reviewers praised the game's light/tonic puzzle mechanic and dialogue between Helsing and Raffton. Describing the gameplay as "unique", James Pikover of GameZone found it entertaining for both short and long sittings. Ryan Rigney of GamePro opined that the game was consistently enjoyable by introducing new mechanics throughout its first 90 stages, and complimented the boss fights as "unique and challenging". Tim Rattray of Slide to Play considered the game to have good replay value with an endless mode, leaderboards, and puzzles for each level changing depending on the set difficulty. He also praised the game's dialogue as "quick and witty"; Rigney described it as "amusing" and with "a quasi Sherlock Holmes vibe".

Critics also praised Helsing's Fire's visuals: Levi Buchanan of IGN complimented the design of the rays of light, while Rattray praised various details like the "character reactions, comic-esque onomatopoeia, and enemy animation that ensues when they are in the light". The game's Victorian era-style art design was described as "fresh and fun to behold" by Winda Bendetti of MSNBC. Reception towards the game's difficulty was mixed. Writers for The A.V. Club asserted that the earlier stages "hold your hands"; Buchanan blamed the random puzzle generation for the lack of difficulty. Pocket Gamer's Jon Jordan opined that the "more thought-provoking and carefully designed puzzles" of the last 30 levels of the first campaign were "replaced with situations that require less thinking and faster fingers", and claimed that "there's plenty of potential to craft a much more challenging experience based on this design".

The game sold 60,000 units in its first week; sales tapered off significantly after its initial release.

Helsing's Fire won the "Best Mobile Game" award at the 2011 Independent Games Festival, with honorable mentions for the "Excellence in Visual Art" and "Excellence in Design" awards.
