= Playdate (console) =

Video game console

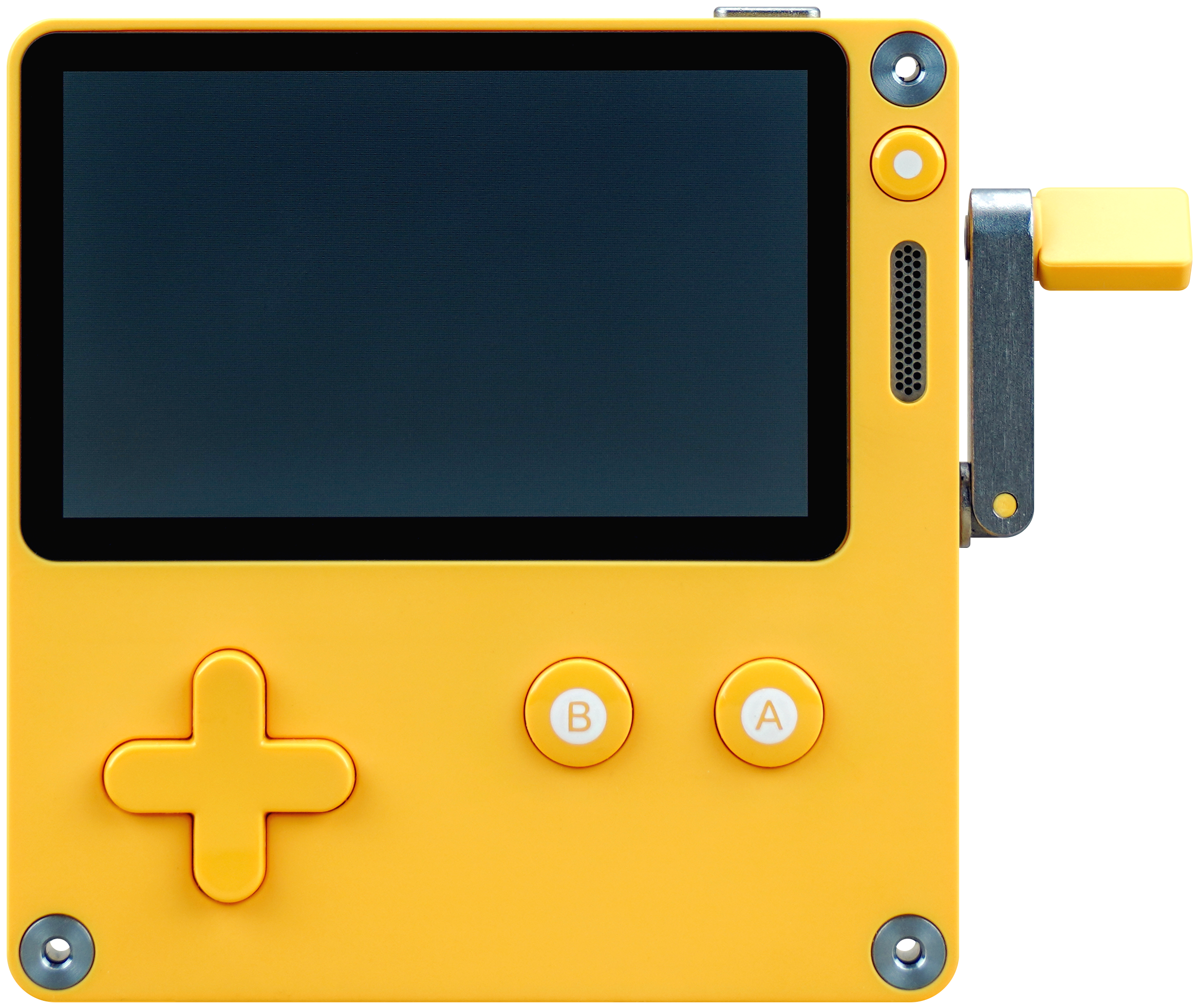
- Playdate with the crank in the open position
- Codename: Asheville
- Developer: Panic Inc.
- Type: Handheld game console
- Released: April 19, 2022
- Introductory price: US$179 (Note: Price increased to US$199 on April 7, 2023 and to US$229 on March 20, 2025.)
- Units sold: >70,000
- System on a chip: STM32F746
- CPU: ARM Cortex-M7F @ 168 MHz (Note: 180 MHz in early units)
- Memory: 16 MB RAM; 8 KB L1 Cache
- Storage: 4 GB eMMC
- Display: 2.7-in, 400×240, 1-bit, 173 ppi
- Input: D-pad; 4 × buttons (A, B, Sleep, Menu); Accelerometer; Crank; Microphone
- Connectivity: Wi-Fi (b/g/n) @ 2.4 GHz; Bluetooth 4.2; USB-C; Headphone/mic jack
- Dimensions: 76×74×9 mm (2.99×2.91×0.35 in)
- Weight: 86 g (3 oz)
- Website: play.date

The Playdate is a handheld video game console developed by Panic Inc. The device features a mechanical crank and a black-and-white screen. The console was announced in May 2019 and was released in April 2022. Many of the Playdate's games are released digitally in seasons, with the first season included with the purchase of the console. The console was well-received at its release, with critics praising its unique hardware.

== Hardware ==
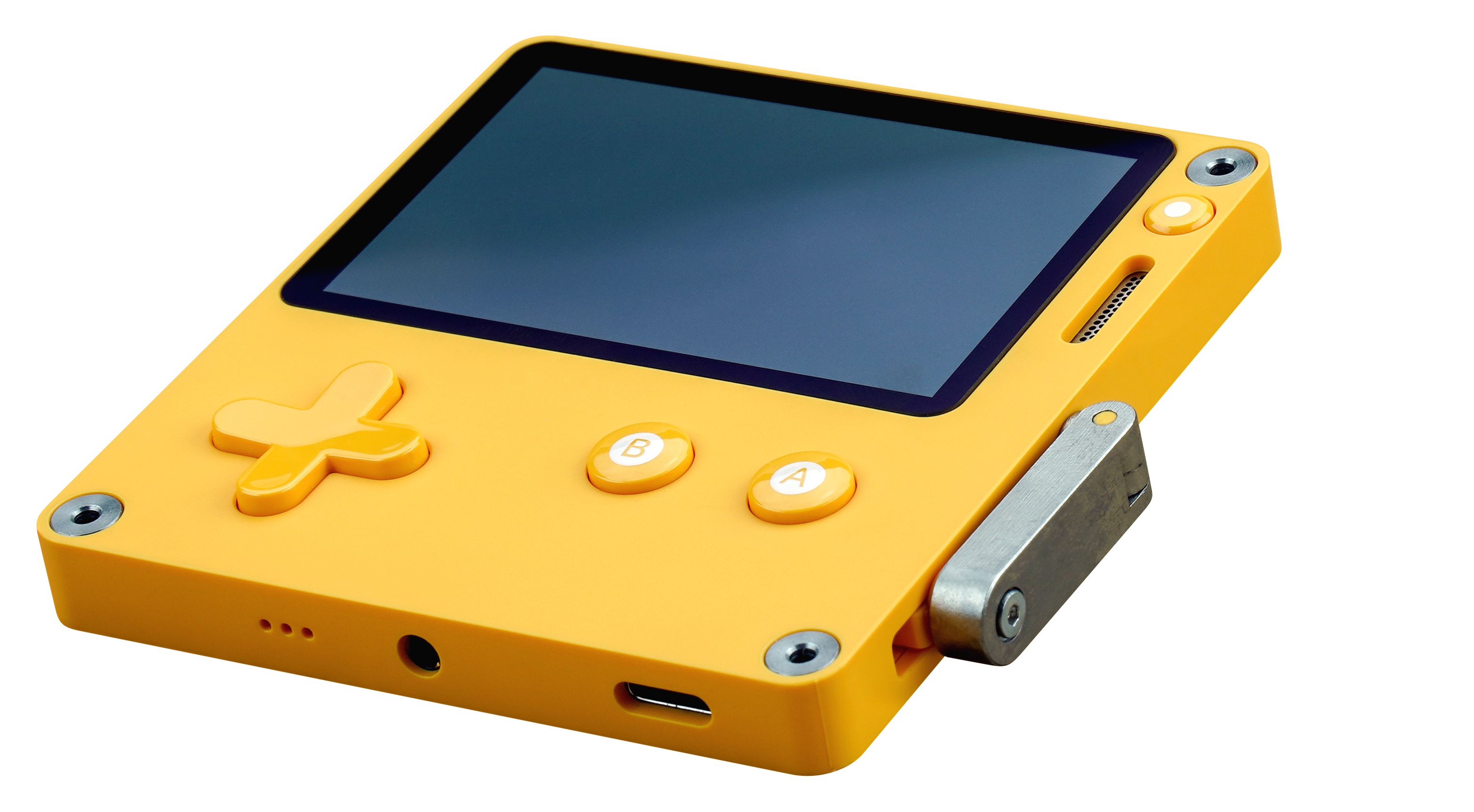
Playdate with the crank tucked away into the side slot

The device is compact, square, and yellow, featuring a black-and-white binary display and various input controls: a D-pad, two game buttons (A and B), a foldable mechanical crank used for gameplay in select titles, a sleep switch, and a menu button. Designed in collaboration with Swedish consumer electronics company Teenage Engineering, it incorporates a Memory LCD screen made by Sharp that visually resembles e-paper. This technology enables each pixel to retain its state (black or white) without constant refreshing, resulting in faster refresh rates, lower power consumption, and a wide 170° viewing angle.

Internally, the Playdate operates on two microcontrollers. The STM32F746, powered by an ARM Cortex-M7F CPU clocked at 168 MHz with an 8 KB L1 cache, manages the console’s core functions, including firmware, graphics, and audio. The processor uses an external 16 MB low-power pseudo-static RAM chip on the motherboard. The ESP32-D0WDQ6 handles Wi-Fi and Bluetooth connectivity. The Playdate includes 4 GB of eMMC flash storage for games and system data.

The device also includes built-in Wi-Fi connectivity, a mono speaker, a microphone, and a headphone jack with microphone input support. While it contains the necessary hardware for audio over Bluetooth, current software revisions do not yet support this feature.

=== Accessories ===
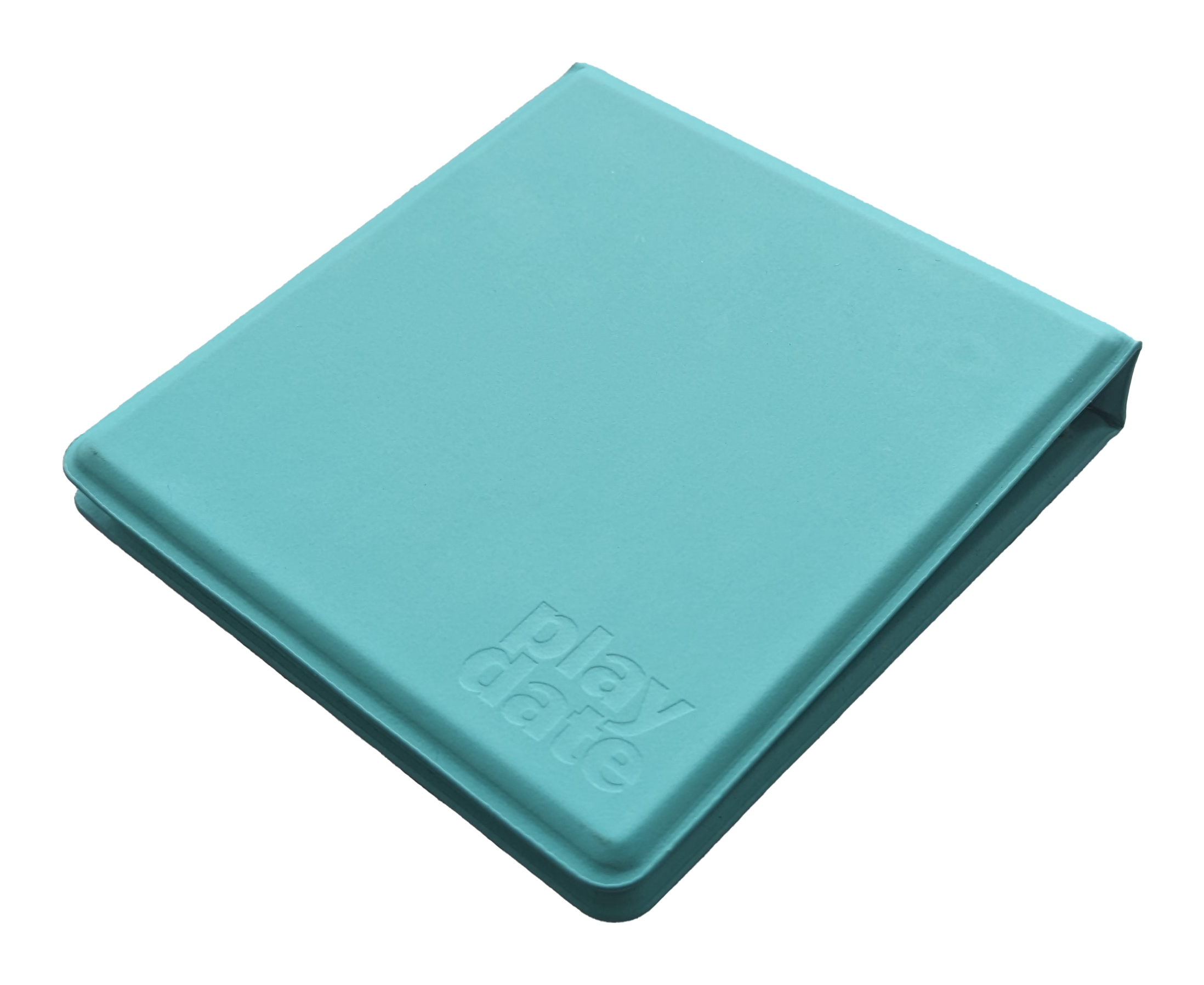
A Playdate cover in Aqua

Panic has announced two accessories for the device. A purple cover was released simultaneously with the device's 2022 launch, and later offered in aqua and yellow. Panic also released a cover that mimics the look of a pizza box.

A yellow "stereo dock" that charges the Playdate and functions as a speaker and a penholder was announced in 2021, but in 2024 the device was shelved.

== Games ==
=== Distribution ===
Playdate comes with Season One: a collection of 24 games. Every week, two new games of Season One appear on the user's console. The price of Season One is included in the price of the console. The order of released games was unknown until the week they were released, and were revealed to players when they automatically downloaded.

On March 7, 2023, the Catalog on-device and on-web store was added. Playdate owners can purchase and download games directly from the device.

On October 31, 2024, Panic announced that Season Two would be released in 2025.

On April 16, 2026, Panic announced Season Three set for release later that same year.

=== Developers ===
Games for the Playdate have been produced by Panic as well as indie game developers such as Keita Takahashi, Zach Gage, Bennett Foddy, Lucas Pope, Shaun Inman, and Chuck Jordan. Panic stated that they were interested in games created by underrepresented developers and that there were games from women and LGBTQ developers in Playdate's first season.

Games are created using an openly available proprietary software development kit (SDK) that includes a simulator and debugger. The SDK is compatible with both C and Lua programming languages. It is available for macOS, Windows, and Linux. Simpler tile-based games can be created using Pulp, a more-approachable game development tool from Panic. The device is an open system and allows sideloading additional games that are not part of a season.

=== Accolades ===
The game YOYOZO, developed by Matt Sephton, was included in Ars Technica's "Best Video Games of 2023" list, appearing alongside titles such as Super Mario Bros. Wonder, The Legend of Zelda: Tears of the Kingdom, Baldur's Gate 3, and others.

=== List ===
Several games were released outside of the seasons, such as Mars After Midnight in 2024.

==== Season 1 (2022) ====
No.	Title	Developer(s)	Release date	Ref.
1	Casual Birder	Diego Garcia	April 18, 2022	
2	Whitewater Wipeout	Chuhai Labs	April 18, 2022	
3	Crankin's Time Travel Adventure	uvula	April 25, 2022	
4	Boogie Loops	May-Li Khoe, Andy Matuschak	April 25, 2022	
5	Lost Your Marbles	Sweet Baby Inc.	May 2, 2022	
6	Pick Pack Pup	Nic Magnier, Arthur Hamer, Logan Gabriel	May 2, 2022	
7	Flipper Lifter	Serenity Forge	May 9, 2022	
8	Echoic Memory	Samantha Zero	May 9, 2022	
9	Omaze	Gregory Kogos	May 16, 2022	
10	DemonQuest 85	Crooked Park	May 16, 2022	
11	Zipper	Bennett Foddy	May 23, 2022	
12	Hyper Meteor	Vertex Pop	May 23, 2022	
13	Questy Chess	Dadako	May 30, 2022	
14	Executive Golf DX	davemakes	May 30, 2022	
15	Saturday Edition	Wild Rose	June 6, 2022	
16	Star Sled	Panic	June 6, 2022	
17	Spellcorked!	Jada Gibbs, Nick Splendorr, Ryan Splendorr	June 13, 2022	
18	Inventory Hero	Panic	June 13, 2022	
19	Snak	stfj	June 20, 2022	
20	Sasquatchers	Chuck Jordan	June 20, 2022	
21	Forrest Byrnes: Up in Smoke	Nels Anderson	June 27, 2022	
22	Battleship Godios	TPM.CO Soft Works	June 27, 2022	
23	b360	Panic	July 4, 2022	
24	Ratcheteer	Shaun Inman, Matthew Grimm, Charlie Davis	July 4, 2022	

==== Season 2 (2025) ====
Season Two is a US$39 bundle of 12 games which premiered from May 29 to July 3, 2025. As with Season One, Season Two's games were delivered to the console in batches of two per week. In addition to these games and unannounced prior to Season Two's premiere, all subscribers gain access to a black-and-white version of Blippo+, an episodic, 11-week-long video series documenting the world and people of Blip, a faraway planet with technology similar to the Playdate, as they discover Earth through a "bend" in space.

No.	Title	Developer(s)	Release date	Ref.
—N/a	Blippo+	YACHT, Telefantasy Studios, Dustin Mierau	May 29, 2025	
1	Fulcrum Defender	Subset Games	May 29, 2025	
2	Dig! Dig! Dino!	Dom2D, Fáyer	May 29, 2025	
3	Wheelsprung	Nino van Hooff, Julie Bjørnskov	June 5, 2025	
4	The Whiteout	Scenic Route Software	June 5, 2025	
5	Otto's Galactic Groove!!	Team Otto	June 12, 2025	
6	Long Puppy	indiana-jonas	June 12, 2025	
7	Shadowgate PD	Pixel Ghost	June 19, 2025	
8	CatchaDiablos	Amano	June 19, 2025	
9	Tiny Turnip	Luke Sanderson	June 26, 2025	
10	Chance's Lucky Escape	Goloso Games, Julia Minamata	June 26, 2025	
11	Black Hole Havoc	Cosmic Bros	July 3, 2025	
12	Taria & Como	Popseed Studio Inc, JuVee Productions	July 3, 2025	

== Reception ==
=== Pre-release ===
On May 22, 2019, Panic announced Playdate. Initial impressions were centered around how unusual the device was, from the crank and its 1-bit screen to its odd method of delivering games to players. About the crank, TechCrunch noted, "It's not necessary for every game, though, so don't worry if it seems too weird."

A year before the Playdate announcement, Panic co-founder Cabel Sasser sent an email to an indie video game event, also named Playdate, suggesting that the organizers consider tweaking or changing its name to avoid future confusion. The following day, Sasser retracted the request, stating "My intention was always to find a way for our Playdates to co-exist [...] but we remain fine with you using the name Playdate." On January 29, 2020, the team behind the event (now named "Playdate Pop Up") announced that Panic was joining the event as a sponsor and would assist the event in petitioning for nonprofit status. In the end, the LA Zinefest event was cancelled due to the COVID-19 pandemic.

=== Release ===
Playdate was initially set for release in early 2020, but preorders were delayed until July 29, 2021. Panic sold through its initial order of 20,000 units set to ship in 2021 within the first 20 minutes of its preorder. Playdates started shipping to customers on April 18, 2022.

Playdate was generally well-received upon its release, with criticism notably around the lack of a backlit screen and long shipping times. The Verge praised its initial library of games, stating "even in this crowded landscape, Playdate offers something entirely unique." IGN's review stated, "the screen's lack of a backlight can be a frustrating limitation. But you know what? The Playdate charmed me and I am now fully under its spell." Input Mag wrote, "It really seems like every opportunity Panic found to do something special, it took it."

On the system's launch date, Panic confirmed to The Verge that the Playdate has sold more than 53,000 units to-date, with 27,000 of those units shipped. Panic expected fulfillment of their existing 26,000 preorders by the end of 2023. Later, on May 1, Panic announced via Twitter that 53,368 Playdates had been pre-ordered so far, with 20,000 games downloaded from their on-device store Catalog. On February 13, 2024, Panic tweeted that over 70,000 Playdates had been sold.
