= Yapyap =

2026 video game

- Developer: Maison Bap
- Publisher: Maison Bap
- Composer: Jonas A. Sjögren
- Platforms: macOS; Windows
- Release: February 3, 2026
- Mode: Multiplayer

Yapyap (stylized in all caps) is a cooperative horror video game developed and published by Maison Bap. It was released on February 3, 2026, for macOS and Windows.

== Development ==
Developer Maison Bap is based in Vancouver, Canada. The game was first playable through a free demo in October 2025. It was available as a part of the Steam Next Fest. Yapyap was officially released on 3 February 2026. After it hit 500,000 sales, the development team stated that they would continue to polish the game before adding new features.

== Gameplay ==
Up to five players work together to use their microphone to cast voice activated magical spells, to destroy objects in a procedurally generated tower. The goal is to survive three nights per round, meeting a destruction quota. Gold can be acquired while destroying objects in the towers, and is used to purchase wands at an item shop. The wands have different voice activated spells associated with their type.

Additionally, enemies can be found in each tower. All can be fought off using spells, with the exception of The Jester.

== Reception ==
The game sold over 500,000 copies in its first week.
