= Guilty as Sock! =

2025 video game

- Steam edition cover
- Developer: Demon Max
- Publisher: Demon Max
- Platforms: Windows; MacOS
- Release: May 29, 2025; 9 months ago
- Genre: Party
- Mode: Multiplayer

Guilty as Sock! is a 2025 party video game developed and published by Demon Max.

== Gameplay ==
Guilty as Sock! is a party video game for three to nine players. Set in a fictional courtroom, the game is played through online multiplayer, with voice chat being a requirement for all. A case, the details of which are decided by the prosecutor, is revealed to all players at the start of the game, based on which they interact with each other throughout.

Each player takes a role, such as the judge, attorney, prosecutor, witness, bailiff, journalist, or jury. Each role, played in first person as a sock puppet, has a unique ability used to impact gameplay. The prosecutor and attorney each have a set of randomly-selected evidence cards, which they use to prove or disprove the defendant's innocence and sway the judge, who has the power to silence lawyers, declare verdicts, and instruct other players. The other roles, which are optional, add additional elements to gameplay. For example, the bailiff may assault other players, while the journalist may create and submit new evidence. Each player has, in addition to their role power, several paper balls they may throw at others to temporarily stun them.

There is no limit to the duration of a game, which ends when the judge declares a verdict.

== Development and release ==
Guilty as Sock! was created by indie developer Demon Max and released for Windows and MacOS through Steam on May 29, 2025, following a brief period in demo.

== Reception ==
Guilty as Sock! received positive reviews upon release. Its extensive player interaction received praise from critics, with Elie Gould of PC Gamer describing it as "the perfect arena" for "unsettled beef".
