= Lethal Company =

Video game

- Developer: Zeekerss
- Publisher: Zeekerss
- Engine: Unity
- Platform: Windows
- Release: October 23, 2023 (early access)
- Genre: Survival horror
- Modes: Single-player, multiplayer

Lethal Company is an upcoming cooperative survival horror video game developed and published by American developer Zeekerss for Windows. It was released in early access in October 2023 and gained popularity on the Steam storefront.

In Lethal Company, players obtain and sell scrap from abandoned, industrialized exomoons while avoiding traps, environmental hazards, monsters, which are often referred to as "anomalies", "entities", or "creatures", and the hostile fauna. As employees of "The Company", players must sell enough scrap to meet a series of increasing profit quotas until they inevitably fail and the game starts over.

== Gameplay ==
A player using a walkie-talkie in a forest

Lethal Company is a cooperative video game for up to four players played in first-person perspective. Set in a retro-futuristic setting, players work as contracted employees of "The Company". They can communicate with each other through the in-game proximity chat, as well as proximity text chat. Players are tasked with visiting abandoned moons to collect as much scrap as possible. Each moon has one facility, either a factory, mansion, or mine, containing procedurally-generated rooms, alongside valuable scrap, hazardous traps, and malicious creatures. Players must work quickly and return to their ship before midnight, or the autopilot will leave without them. If there are no living players on board the ship as it leaves the planet, all collected scrap will be lost. Collected scrap is sold at the Company moon, 71-Gordion, to obtain Company credits. The most valuable of the scrap will be cash registers, bee hives, gold bars, and the rarest item in the game, a Zed-Dog. At the end of each deadline, if the players sell enough scrap to reach the required quota, they will begin another three-day cycle with a higher profit goal. Failure to meet the Company's quota results in players being ejected into space; this constitutes a game over.

Players may only carry four items at a time (five if counting the equipment slot), including one item requiring both hands. Two-handed scrap items, while typically the most valuable, prevent one from performing certain actions when held, like climbing ladders and picking up more items. All carriable scrap requires one free item slot each. There is a fifth slot that is reserved for carrying one-handed equipment that can be accessed by pressing tab. This is separate from the four slots used for holding scrap, as scrap cannot be put into the slot. Players can use their ship's onboard computer terminal to navigate to moons and spend their earned Company credits on equipment and humorous ship accessories, such as a shower or toilet. Furniture also contributes to a hidden 'luck' value which has the chance to decrease the player's quota depending on how much furniture is on the ship. The terminal may also be used to view the positions of other players, open security doors, or temporarily disable landmines and turrets inside the facility.

The game offers twelve playable moons, including the Company's moon where collected scrap is sold. Moons differ in which and how many monsters spawn, as well as the amount and value of scrap available. Players must spend credits to access the most dangerous and lucrative moons. Moons may randomly have dangerous weather conditions or hazards such as fog, quicksand, lightning storms, flooding, or solar eclipses that hinder players' progress.

Players encounter a variety of creatures while exploring. Most are found inside each moon's facility, but some will spawn outdoors. Most entities are hostile towards the players, though some creatures, like the Spore Lizard, Backwater Gunkfish and Hoarding Bug, will remain passive until provoked. The game's monsters include the Thumper, a two-legged beast that can reach high speeds but is bad at making tight turns, and the Bracken, a humanoid creature that stalks its prey before snapping its neck, but runs away when spotted. One of the most dangerous enemies is the Jester, an invincible creature inside a giant jack-in-the-box. It wanders harmlessly until it spots a player, whereupon it will begin following them before stopping to turn its crank. After popping open, it will hunt and kill all players in the facility until all players are outside.

== Development ==
Zeekerss previously developed games on the game creation platform Roblox. Lethal Company was released in early access for Microsoft Windows on October 23, 2023, with development initially planned to be completed within 6 months. Zeekerss expressed a desire for content updates to evoke the feeling of breaking into an "alien zoo" and unleashing all the animals.

== Reception ==
Lethal Company has received critical acclaim on the online storefront platform Steam, topping the platform's Global Top Seller list and having 100,000 concurrent players in November 2023. Its popularity has been attributed to social media and compared to the similar horror game Phasmophobia.

Kelsey Raynor of VG247 noted that the game "...might not look like much given its grisly cel-shaded graphics, but fans are wholly obsessed with Lethal Company, and its gruesome aesthetic is clearly just another part of its charm." Gabriel Moss of IGN said that "Lethal Company already instills a sense of wonder", and that the game's co-op loot hunts "manage to transcend its limited content and missing systems." PCGamesN included Lethal Company on its listing of best horror games available on PC.

According to an approximate estimate by Push To Talk, Lethal Company has sold more than 10 million copies as of January 2024.

The player avatar has appeared in the online video game Fortnite as "The Employee", which was added to the game in June 2024 alongside additional cosmetics and an emote based on Lethal Company.

=== Awards ===
| Award | Date | Category | Result | Ref. |
|---|---|---|---|---|
| The Steam Awards | January 2, 2024 | Game of the Year | Nominated | |
| The Steam Awards | January 2, 2024 | Better With Friends | Won | |
| The Streamer Awards | February 17, 2024 | Stream Game of the Year | Won | |
| 20th British Academy Games Awards | April 11, 2024 | EE Player's Choice Award | Nominated | |
| Golden Joystick Awards | November 21, 2024 | Best Early Access Game | Won | |
| The Vtuber Awards | December 14, 2024 | Stream Game of the Year | Won | |

== See also ==
- SCP Foundation
