= Mars After Midnight =

2024 video game

- Developer(s): Lucas Pope
- Platform(s): Playdate
- Release: March 12, 2024
- Genre(s): Simulation
- Mode(s): Single-player

Mars After Midnight is a 2024 management video game developed and published by Lucas Pope. The player controls an alien running late-night community support groups on off-colony Mars. The game launched in March 2024 as a Playdate exclusive.

== Gameplay ==
The player using the Playdate's crank to wind the peephole open

Each day the player needs to pick what kind of support group they will run the following night, such as Cyclops Anger Management. Then, they are given a choice of different locations on colony to put up flyers. Finally, they choose a snack that will appeal to the people in the group. After sleeping, the player works as a doorman, opening the peephole to check if the alien at the door was invited. They can discern this based on audio cues and visual signs that serve as clues. The player can buy new recipes for food from a traveling salesman occasionally during sessions. A tool named the Blab-o-Dex is later given to the player to help them understand Martian speech.

== Development ==
Developer Lucas Pope desired to develop a game for the Playdate upon its announcement in 2019. Pope announced Mars After Midnight in 2021, describing the game at the time as, "Papers Please, -lite, with no border checkpoint, no desk, no paperwork, on Mars." He wrote that the Playdate's small screen size inspired the mechanic of looking through a peephole. For the Martians, he created various facial elements and randomly combined them in order to create each one.

== Reception ==
Edge liked Mars After Midnight, summarizing: "Proof that you can build a credible, engaging, enveloping setting within the boundaries of a tiny black- and-white display and just 55Mb of storage space. As harmonious a marriage of hardware and software as you'll find in a crossplatform age, what could have been a disposable side project instead cements Pope’s status as one of videogames' smartest designers". GamesRadar+ enjoyed Mars After Midnight, calling attention to the presentation, "It's also a visual delight too, with creative alien designs and inventive silliness throughout, combined with a chip tune soundtrack that's going to earworm itself into your consciousness". Digital Trends wrote that the game justified the console to them, saying, "I don't know what the future of the Playdate will be, but I think it will thrive in the little box Panic created for itself if Mars After Midnight is any indication". While liking the simulation elements, Siliconera felt that the sessions could get repetitive during long play sessions: "The nature of this means that Mars After Midnight can feel a bit tedious".
