= Lucas Pope =

American video game designer (born 1970s)

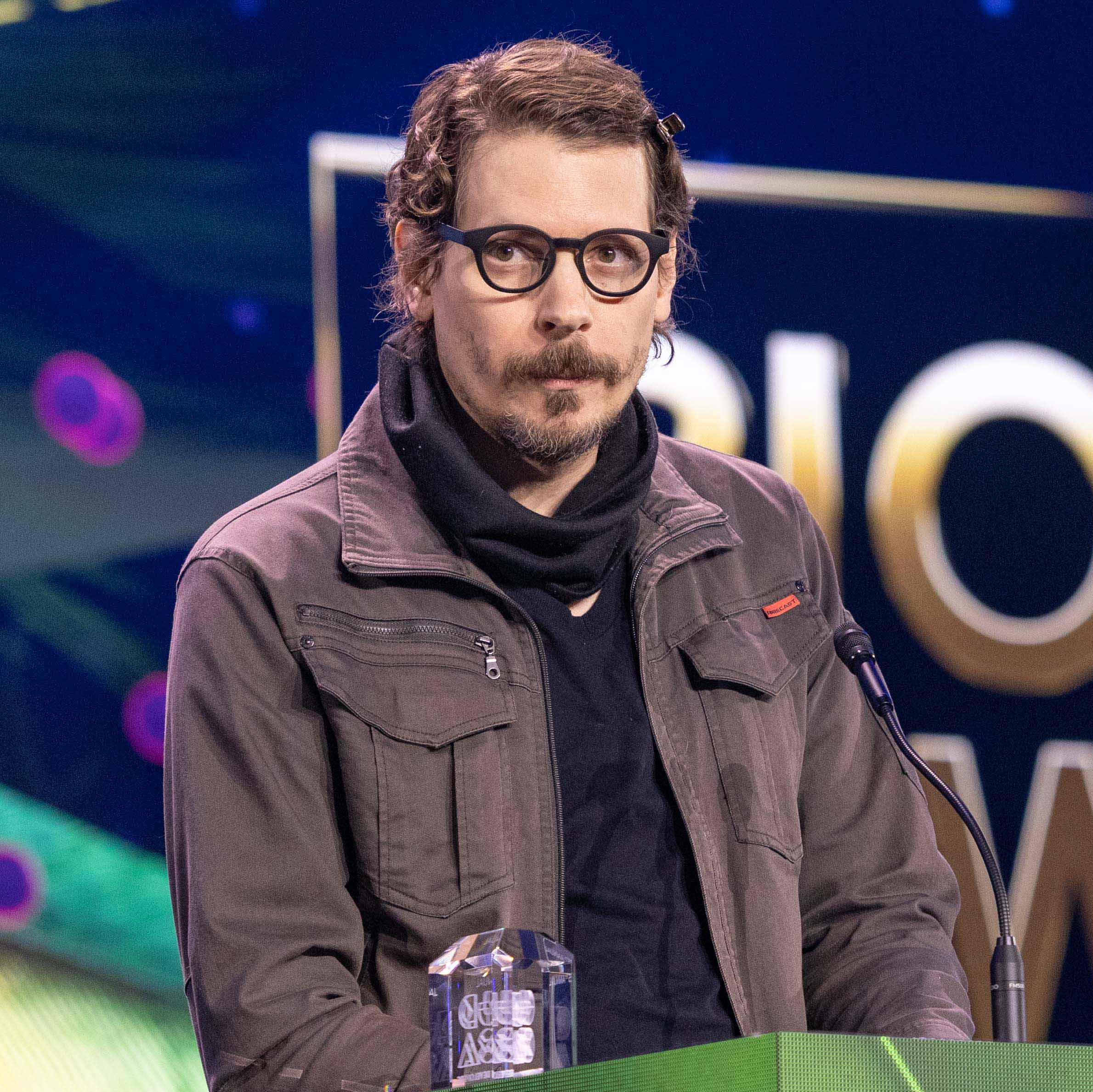
- Pope at the 2025 Game Developers Choice Awards
- Born: 1977 or 1978 (age 48–49)
- Occupation: Video game designer
- Notable credits: Papers, Please; Return of the Obra Dinn
- Spouse: Keiko Ishizaka
- Children: 2

Lucas Pope (born 1977 or 1978) is an American video game designer. He is best known for experimental indie games, notably Papers, Please and Return of the Obra Dinn, both of which won the Seumas McNally Grand Prize alongside other awards and are considered among the greatest video games of all time.

== Early life ==
Pope grew up in Virginia. His father was a handyman, which gave Pope access to a well-stocked array of parts and tools that led to an interest in mechanical engineering. When he got to high school, he met a friend who was interested in robotics; the two of them would take retail robot kits, take them apart, and reconnect them to their own computers to see how to control them. Inspired to continue into the mechanical and robotics field, Pope attended Virginia Tech to study mechanical engineering. He found that the reality of the field was less desirable than what he wanted, but took strong interest in the computer programming side of his coursework. During this period, he got involved with the Quake community and helped to develop mods for Quake and other games, principally working on the art used for the characters in the mods.

== Career ==
=== Early titles (1997–2007) ===
Pope collaborated with other video game modders, including working on an officially-sanctioned Quake mod by Sony Pictures to promote Anaconda. Pope and another set of modders decided to form their own studio, Ratloop, releasing the total Quake conversion mod Malice in 1997. Ratloop struggled with distribution through retail channels. While Walmart would help distribute their game, the chain required Ratloop to have 5,000 copies ready to ship within 24 hours at any time, requiring Ratloop to secure a publisher to help.

==== Gearhead Garage ====
After a first failed 3D game, Ratloop decided to develop a car repair game, Gearhead Garage. It was successful enough to be picked up by Activision for retail distribution. Snap-On Gearhead Garage: The Virtual Mechanic is a PC game in which players repair and customize late model cars and trucks. It was created by Mekada, endorsed by Snap-on Tools, and published in 1999 by Head Games (subsequently acquired by Activision). There is no feature for driving the cars but Gearhead Garage introduced an entirely new "bolt-em up" paradigm. The appeal is reminiscent of taking things apart in real life—players can completely disassemble the engine, repair the individual parts, reassemble them, and then exhibit the completed result in their 3D "car lot". The game also features a series of "jobs", wherein the player fixes vehicles owned by fictional characters. This allows them to earn money to buy custom items from the catalog, auction, or junkyard.

==== Experimental games ====
The success of Gearhead Garage gave Ratloop sufficient funds to try a number of experimental games, something which had interested Pope. However, none of these were published, and facing competition from other studios, particularly from Eastern Europe, that could make games at substantially lower prices, Ratloop became dormant.

Pope left Ratloop and joined Realtime Associates in 2003. While at Realtime, he was part of the team that developed the game Re-Mission, a 2006 shooter whose goal was to encourage children with cancer to take their chemotherapy medication.

=== Naughty Dog (2007–2010) ===
Pope moved to Santa Monica and got a job with Naughty Dog in 2007. While Pope did not have a strong programming background, he felt that Naughty Dog had hired him because of his interest in developing the tools and interfaces needed to help in programming their games. Pope's strength in developing GUI tools mitigated Naughty Dog's weakness at that time, with Pope stating that at the time of his hiring, "there was no full-time GUI tools guy at all...Just command-line, back-end tools people." Pope had been hired about halfway through the development of Uncharted: Drake's Fortune, and continued to work on the sequel Uncharted 2: Among Thieves. He credited the director of the sequel Bruce Straley for teaching him how to focus a game's design around core concepts to make the game fun, even if this meant sacrificing work that had already been completed. Former Naughty Dog president Christophe Balestra said of Pope's work on their design tools: "We were desperate to find a good tools programmer. He was part of the people who saved the day." Specifically, Pope developed GUI tools for the games' menus systems, save systems, level layout to assist level designers, and a system to organize sound and text files for various languages.

After Uncharted 2 had shipped in 2009, Naughty Dog was set to continue onto the next sequel, Uncharted 3: Drake's Deception, but Pope wanted to spend more time on his love of experimental games. In the interim between games, he and his wife Keiko Ishizaka spent two weeks developing Mightier, a small game based around creating 3D levels from camera scans of a 2D drawing, and its title a play on the phrase "The pen is mightier than the sword". They submitted Mightier to the Independent Games Festival (IGF) where it was nominated for one of the awards, and which led to Valve contacting Pope about putting Mightier up on Steam as a free game.

=== Independent (2010–present) ===
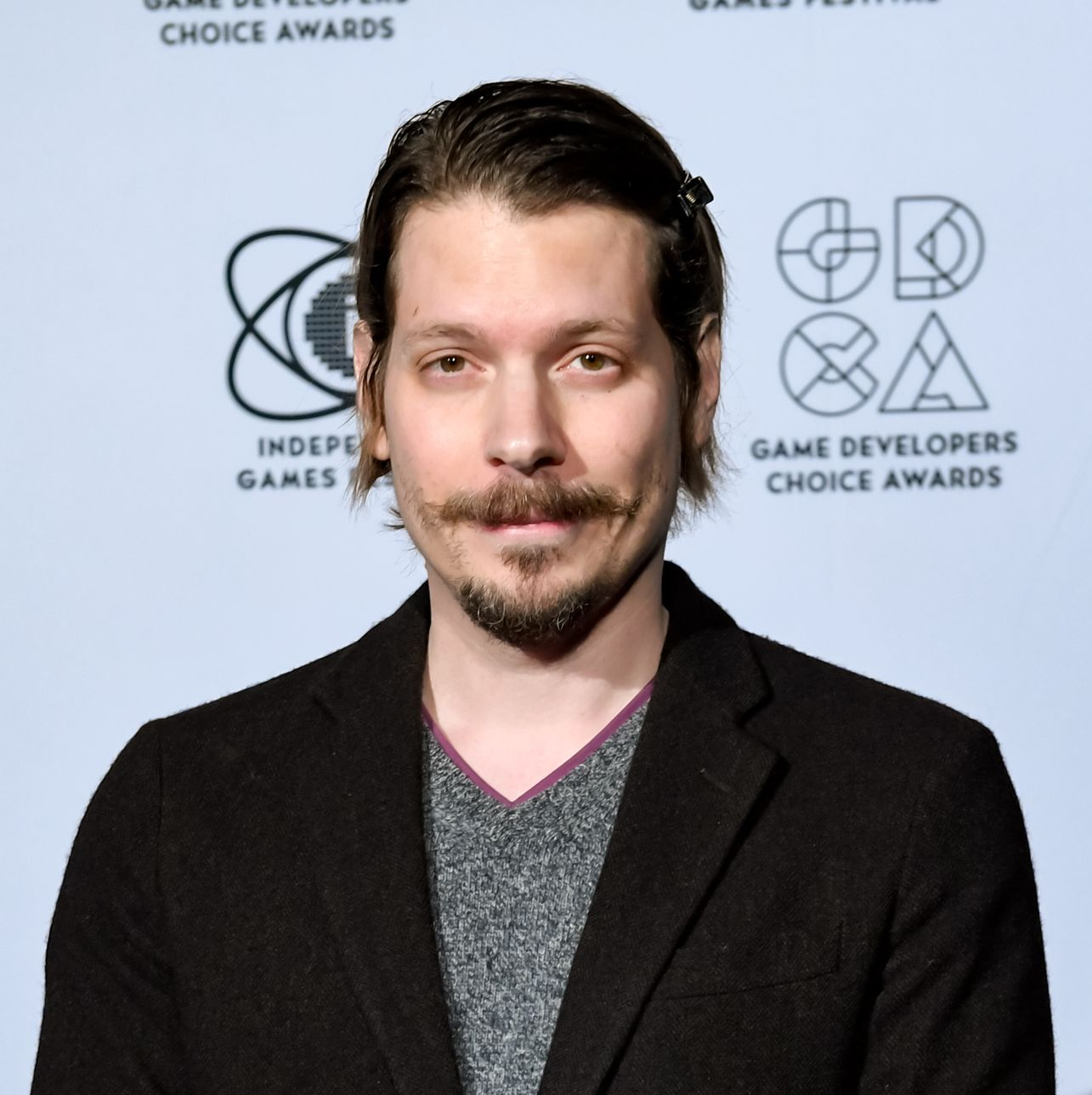
Pope at the 2019 Game Developers Choice Awards

Both Pope and Ishizaka decided to quit their current jobs in 2010 and moved to Saitama, Japan, in close proximity to Ishizaka's family, and continue to pursue small independent game development. Over the next few years, the two worked on a number of experimental games. One of their first was a mobile game called Helsing's Fire, which won the 2011 IGF for Best Mobile Game. Another title was The Republia Times in 2012 which he had come up with originally as part of a Ludum Dare game jam. He helped to port Rocketbirds: Hardboiled Chicken, a game developed by members of Ratloop, to the PlayStation 3. This work required him and Ishizaka to temporarily live in Singapore for about a year with frequent trips to the United States. During these travels, Pope came upon an idea for a game involving a passport inspector, which served as the inspiration for Pope's breakout game, Papers, Please, released first in 2013. Papers, Please was critically praised, winning several awards including several Game Developers Choice and IGF awards (including the Seumas McNally Grand Prize for best indie game) as well as a British Academy (BAFTA) Games Award for Best Simulation Game. For Pope and his wife, Papers, Please was financially successful; the game had sold about 1.8 million copies by August 2016, and through 2018, still sold enough that Pope was not worried about his financial security as he was developing his next game, Return of the Obra Dinn.

Obra Dinn's development had started shortly after Pope had completed all the work on Papers, Please, and took about four and a half years, principally due to Pope's expanded narrative. On its release in 2018, it received similar high praise as Papers, Please, and was nominated for and won several awards from the Game Developers Choice, IGF, Peabody, and D.I.C.E. Awards (including a second Seumas McNally Grand Prize), as well as being named one of the top games of 2018.

In March 2024, Pope released Mars After Midnight exclusively for the Playdate system. In the game, players manage a community center among aliens on Mars. The character art for the Martians is procedurally generated, and the voices are synthesized using a system Pope developed. Pope said that he created the game with his children in mind. Wes Fenlon, writing for PC Gamer, called the game "pleasant." After Mars After Midnight's release, Pope has stated he intends to return to develop games for PC.

In April 2026, Pope revealed that he no longer feels comfortable talking about his ongoing projects over fears his unreleased work "would be slurped up by AI".

== Personal life ==
Pope and his wife Keiko Ishizaka live in Saitama, Japan, with two children. They met while both working at Realtime and continued their relationship while Pope was at Naughty Dog and Ishizaka was at nearby 2K Games.

== Ludography ==
Year	Title (Note: List sourced from Pope's website.)	Platforms	Notes
2009	Mightier	Windows	Developed at Ratloop
2010	Helsing's Fire	iOS	Developed at Ratloop
2012	The Republia Times	Browser	
2012	6 Degrees of Sabotage	Browser	Ludum Dare 23 entry
2013	Papers, Please	Windows, macOS, Linux, iOS, Android, PSVita	
2014	The Sea Has No Claim	Browser	Ludum Dare 29 entry
2015	Unsolicited	Browser	Ludum Dare 33 entry
2018	Return of the Obra Dinn	Windows, macOS, PS4, Xbox One, Switch	
2023	LCD, Please	Browser	Celebrating 10 years of Papers, Please
2024	Mars After Midnight	Playdate	
2024	Moida Mansion	Browser	
