= Push Me Pull You =

2016 video game

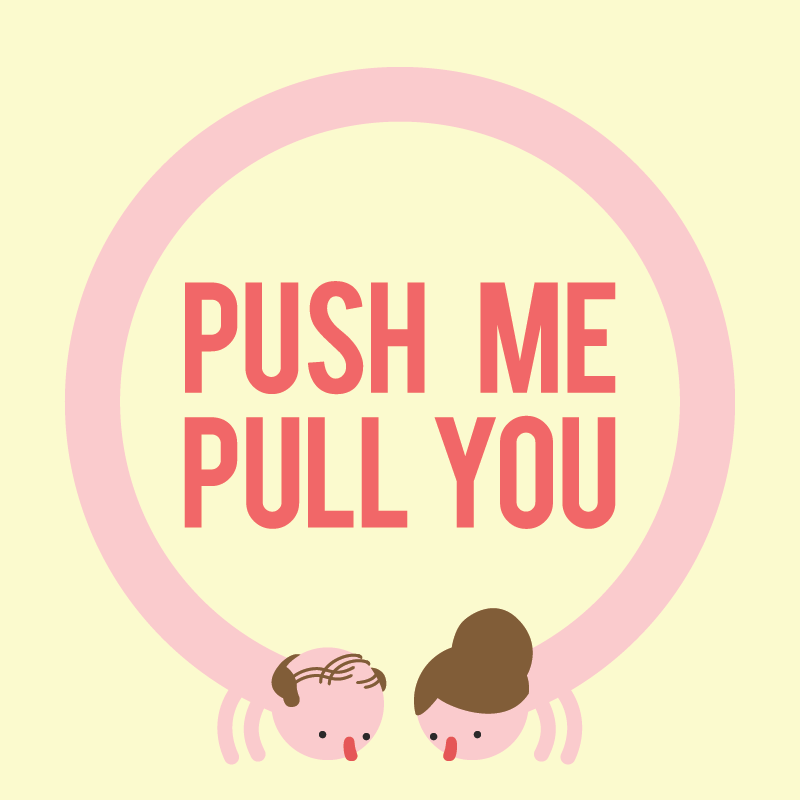
- Developer: House House
- Composer: Dan Golding
- Platforms: PlayStation 4, macOS, Linux, Windows
- Release: PlayStation 4; May 3, 2016; Windows, Mac, Linux; July 12, 2016

Push Me Pull You is a 2016 video game based on wrestling, developed by the Australian company House House. It was originally released in 2016 for PlayStation 4, Windows, Mac, and Linux.

== Gameplay ==
Videos of gameplay

In a game of Push Me Pull You, two teams of sausage-like bodies with heads at both ends face off in a circle for territorial control of a ball. The game has two- and four-player modes. There is a hidden option to swap the human heads for those of dogs.

== Development ==
Push Me Pull You was developed by four friends from Melbourne as the indie developer House House. They have said that the game is about friendship and wrestling. The game was named for the two-headed llama pushmi-pullyu from Doctor Dolittle, and was originally planned for release in 2014. It was exhibited at Game Developers Conference 2014 and the 2015 PlayStation Experience. The game was announced for the PlayStation 4 in November 2015. Push Me Pull You was finally scheduled for release for PlayStation 4 on May 3, 2016, and for Microsoft Windows, OS X, and Linux later in the year.

== Reception ==
On review aggregator Metacritic, the game received "generally favorable reviews" on PlayStation 4, with a score of 75 out of 100, based on 4 reviews. Sam Machkovech of Ars Technica said that the game was the best among its contemporary wave of "couch sports" games: non-combat multiplayer with elements similar to old sports video games. He added that the game's aesthetic was reminiscent of Adult Swim. Jamin Warren of Kill Screen wrote that the game's core gameplay has a "Koonsian quality of both innocent and grotesque". Alice O'Connor of Rock, Paper, Shotgun called the game "David Cronenberg's Wrestleball". Andrew Tarantola from Engadget compared Push Me Pull You to a combination of Greco-Roman wrestling, capture the flag, Human Centipede, and soccer. Writing for Polygon, Megan Farokhmanesh and Allegra Frank praised the game as "one of the most fast-paced, unique, and entertaining additions" entries in the local multiplayer genre.
