= House House =

Australian video game developer

House House Pty Ltd
- Formerly: House House Games Pty Ltd
- Industry: Video games
- Founded: 5 August 2014; 12 years ago
- Founders: Nico Disseldorp; Jake Strasser; Stuart Gillespie-Cook; Michael McMaster
- Headquarters: Melbourne, Australia
- Website: househouse.com

House House Pty Ltd is an Australian independent video game developer based in Melbourne. They are known for their video games Push Me Pull You (2016), Untitled Goose Game (2019), and Big Walk (2026). Untitled Goose Game cleared one million copies in its first three months on sale, according to publisher Panic. The game went on to win Game of the Year at both the 23rd Annual D.I.C.E. Awards and the 20th Game Developers Choice Awards. Big Walk cleared the same 1 million figure in six days, also according to Panic. The indie studio comprises four people: Nico Disseldorp, Jake Strasser, Stuart Gillespie-Cook, and Michael McMaster.

== History ==
The studio was incorporated as House House Pty Ltd on 5 August 2014 following early collaborations in Melbourne's experimental game-jam scene. Their first video game, Push Me Pull You, released for PlayStation 4 on 3 May 2016 and for computer systems on 12 July 2016. In 2017, a gameplay trailer for Untitled Goose Game went viral, which led to the company signing a publishing deal with Panic Inc. The 90-second prototype clip amassed more than two million Twitter views within its first week, sparking global media attention. Panic's role was limited to funding and marketing support while House House retained full intellectual-property rights. The game was later released on 20 September 2019, to critical acclaim, on the platforms Nintendo Switch, Microsoft Windows and macOS, with ports for the PlayStation 4 and Xbox One which released on 17 December 2019. Untitled Goose Game was a commercial success, topping the download charts for the Nintendo Switch in Australia, the United Kingdom, and the United States. Publisher co-founder Cabel Sasser confirmed on 31 December 2019 that total sales had passed one million copies. The title's "honk-to-stealth" conceit generated a flood of memes and mainstream press coverage, including a Time feature that called it a "viral phenomenon." At the 2019 Australian Game Developer Awards, the game won Game of the Year and Best Sound Design.

In January 2020, House House confirmed they were giving 1% of all profits to the Pay the Rent movement, in recognition that they make their video games on "stolen Wurundjeri land."

House House's latest project, the open-world co-operative adventure Big Walk, was first announced at The Game Awards in December 2023, and was described as "a cooperative walker-talker about getting lost with friends". Kalonica Quigley joined House House as its first new employee and fifth member after the release of Untitled Goose Game and during Big Walk's development; the studio has remained at this small size. On 6 June 2025, the launch window was shifted to 2026 after further gameplay reveals at Day of the Devs: Summer Game Fest Edition. Big Walk released on August 4, 2026 to positive reviews from critics, and Panic stated that it had sold over 1 million copies in its first six days.

== Development and technology ==
All House House titles are developed in the Unity engine, a choice the team credits for enabling rapid prototyping by a four-person staff. For Big Walk the studio experimented with proximity voice chat, physical communication props, and a diegetic soundtrack by AKSFX, as detailed in its Day of the Devs 2025 presentation.

== Philanthropy ==
In January 2020, House House pledged to donate at least 1% of all future revenue to Indigenous organisations through Australia's Pay the Rent movement. Initial beneficiaries included the Wurundjeri Tribe Council, Warriors of Aboriginal Resistance, and the Seed Indigenous Youth Climate Network.

== Video games ==
Year	Title	Platform(s)	Publisher(s)
2016	Push Me Pull You	Linux, macOS, PlayStation 4, Windows	House House
2019	Untitled Goose Game	macOS, Nintendo Switch, PlayStation 4, Windows, Xbox One	Panic Inc.
2026	Big Walk	macOS, Windows, PlayStation 5, Nintendo Switch 2	Panic Inc.

== Awards and recognition ==
Year	Award	Category	Title	Result
2019	Australian Game Developer Awards	Game of the Year; Best Sound Design	Untitled Goose Game	Won
2020	23rd Annual D.I.C.E. Awards	Game of the Year; Outstanding Achievement for an Independent Game; Outstanding Achievement in Character (The Goose)	Untitled Goose Game	Won
2020	20th Game Developers Choice Awards	Game of the Year	Untitled Goose Game	Won
