= Proximity chat =

Type of web conferencing

Proximity chat or spatial chat or positional chat is a type of Internet platform that overlays video teleconferencing software on a virtual world environment, so that users can navigate freely and have conversations among small groups.

A distribution of small groups across a virtual world map can be more informal than a many-to-many session, and to some extent this format is a functional replacement for breakout rooms. Some of the platforms employ a retrogaming aesthetic similar to a 2D overworld, while others work from a blank virtual world or one built up of a collage of photos placed by the user.

Proximity chat has been included in many multiplayer video games. One popular software for implementing this functionality in games without built-in proximity chat is Mumble. Global voice chats, especially those of an MMO-style video game hosting hundreds of players, tend to become cluttered. A proximity chat would allow teams of players to coordinate in-game without having to use external calling applications like Discord or Microsoft Teams.

== Usages ==
Several video games use this method to encourage teamplay or to enhance atmosphere and immersion. In the video game Hell Let Loose, a World War II FPS game, proximity chat is only allowed between friendly players as a means to emulate real-life combat before the widespread usage of squad-based radio communication. Other games like Phasmophobia use a tighter proximity chat, where players become muffled if in the next room or down a hallway. This feature adds immersion to simulate the feelings of isolation and horror inherent in the game. There are also games which value cooperation between players, such as Peak in which players and their friends climb mountains and other obstacles to reach the end of the game together.

In 2021, the children's game platform Roblox introduced a proximity chat feature for verified users over the age of 13. This feature prompted complaints by privacy advocates, since verification involves submitting a selfie and government-issued ID to the company, which has a prior history of data leaks. Users have also expressed skepticism that the verification system has properly excluded younger users. Users and the parents of users have also complained, as inappropriate content such as slurs, sexual content, and illegal conduct such as drug deals have been documented as being audible on the platform.

== See also ==
- Chat room
- Metaverse
