= Brotato =

2023 video game

- Developers: Blobfish Games (Note: Android and iOS versions ported and published by Erabit Studios); Evil Empire
- Publisher: Blobfish Games
- Director: Thomas Gervraud
- Programmer: Kilian Diener
- Composer: Adonai
- Engine: Godot
- Platforms: Windows; Android; iOS; Nintendo Switch; Nintendo Switch 2; PlayStation 4; PlayStation 5; Xbox One; Xbox Series X/S
- Release: Windows; June 23, 2023; Android, iOS; March 28, 2023; Switch; August 3, 2023; PS4, PS5, Xbox One & Series X/S; January 30, 2024; Nintendo Switch 2; November 20, 2025
- Genres: Roguelite, shoot 'em up
- Modes: Single-player, multiplayer

Brotato is a 2023 top-down shoot 'em up roguelike video game developed by French independent developer Thomas Gervraud under the studio name Blobfish Games. Later development was taken over by Evil Empire under Blobfish's oversight.

It was initially released in early access on Steam in 2022, during which it sold over one million copies; by 2025, it had sold over 10 million copies. Brotato has garnered positive reviews from both critics and players and has since been ported to multiple platforms.

== Gameplay ==
Players control one of several potatoes from a top-down perspective. Many of these characters are unlocked as the player progresses through the game and possess different starting attributes. The objective is to defeat as many waves of enemies as possible using the potato. After each wave, players can upgrade and enhance various attributes and weapons, which can be purchased with materials collected during gameplay. Brotato is classified as a shoot 'em up. Shooting is automatically managed by the computer, although players have the option to change this setting to enable manual aiming.

== Development and release ==
Brotato is the fourth game developed by Blobfish, a one-man indie studio based in Lyon, France (now in Zurich, Switzerland) during its development. It entered early access on Steam for Windows on September 27, 2022, followed by the full release on June 23, 2023.

The Android and iOS ports, developed and published by Erabit Studios, were released on March 28, 2023. On mobile devices, Brotato is available in both free-to-play and premium versions. The Nintendo Switch version was released on August 3, 2023. Versions for PlayStation 4, PlayStation 5, Xbox One, and Xbox Series X/S were released on January 30, 2024, and became available via Xbox Game Pass at launch.

The game's first DLC titled "Abyssal Terrors" and an update which added local co-op gameplay were released in October 2024.

Blobfish announced in September 2025 that they will be transferring ongoing development work on Brotato to Evil Empire, with Blobfish still overseeing the game's direction.

== Reception ==
Reception

Aggregate score
Aggregator	Score
Metacritic	PC: 76/100

Rock Paper Shotgun, which reviewed the game during early access, compared it to "a hit Flash game on Newgrounds in 2006". While they appreciated the retro gameplay, they noted that death occurred a bit too easily. TouchArcade remarked that although it initially appears to be a simple clone of Vampire Survivors, it incorporates roguelike elements and is more strategic, thereby establishing a distinct identity. Screen Rant described the game mechanics as addictive, quick, and easily accessible, providing ample freedom for strategy and experimentation. The website included it in their list of the best indie games of 2022. Digital Trends referred to it as a "smart evolution of the Vampire Survivors formula" that emphasizes more dynamic character builds.

It was one of the most popular roguelite games on Steam in 2022 and 2023, receiving "overwhelmingly positive" reviews from users. As of September 2022, it had sold over a million copies, and it was nominated for "Best Steam Deck Game" at the 2023 Steam Awards.
