= The Steam Awards =

Annual awards event hosted by Valve

- Awarded for: User-voted favorites on Steam
- First award: December 31, 2016; 9 years ago
- Website: store.steampowered.com/steamawards/

The Steam Awards are an annual user-voted award event for video games published on Valve's Steam service. Introduced in 2016, game nomination and voting periods are concurrent with Steam's annual autumn and winter holiday sales, centered around the holidays of American Thanksgiving and Christmas.

== Format ==
The Steam Awards are selected in two phases. In the first phase, Valve selects a number of categories, atypical of those used in gaming awards, and allows any registered Steam user to select one game available on Steam for that category. Valve subsequently reviews the nominations and then selects the top five games for final voting. These nominations are then presented to Steam users, giving them the opportunity to vote in each category. Following this, Valve announces the winners. Game nomination and voting periods are concurrent with Steam's annual autumn and winter holiday sales, centered around the holidays of Thanksgiving and Christmas.

== Awards ==
=== 2016 ===
The nomination process took place from November 23–29, 2016. The voting took place from December 22–30, 2016, with the winners announced on December 31. The awards received around 15 million nominations.

The 'Villain Most In Need Of A Hug' Award	The 'I Thought This Game Was Cool Before It Won An Award' Award
Portal 2; Borderlands 2; Dead by Daylight; Far Cry 3; Far Cry 4	Euro Truck Simulator 2; Paladins; Starbound; Stardew Valley; Unturned
The 'Test of Time' Award	The 'Just 5 More Minutes' Award
The Elder Scrolls V: Skyrim; Age of Empires II HD; Sid Meier's Civilization V; Team Fortress 2; Terraria	Counter-Strike: Global Offensive; Fallout 4; Rocket League; Sid Meier's Civilization VI; Terraria
The 'Whoooaaaaaaa, dude!' Award	The 'Game Within A Game Award' Award
Grand Theft Auto V; BioShock Infinite; Doom; Metal Gear Solid V: The Phantom Pain; The Witcher 3: Wild Hunt	Grand Theft Auto V; Garry’s Mod; The Stanley Parable; Tabletop Simulator; The Witcher 3: Wild Hunt
The 'I'm Not Crying, There's Something In My Eye' Award	The 'Best Use Of A Farm Animal' Award
The Walking Dead; Life Is Strange; This War of Mine; To the Moon; Undertale	Goat Simulator; ARK: Survival Evolved; Blood and Bacon; Farming Simulator 17; Stardew Valley
The 'Boom Boom' Award (community created)	The 'Love/Hate Relationship' Award (community created)
Doom; BroForce; Just Cause 3; Keep Talking and Nobody Explodes; Kerbal Space Program	Dark Souls III; Darkest Dungeon; Dota 2; Geometry Dash; Super Meat Boy
The 'Sit Back and Relax' Award (community created)	The 'Better With Friends' Award (community created)
Euro Truck Simulator 2; Abzu; Cities Skylines; Mini Metro; Viridi	Left 4 Dead 2; Don't Starve Together; Gang Beasts; Golf with Your Friends; Magicka

=== 2017 ===
The nomination process took place from November 22–28, 2017. The voting took place from December 20, 2017, to January 2, 2018, with the winners announced on January 3.

The 'Choices Matter' Award	The 'Mom's Spaghetti' Award
The Witcher 3: Wild Hunt; Dishonored 2; Divinity: Original Sin 2; Life Is Strange: Before the Storm; The Walking Dead: A New Frontier	PlayerUnknown's Battlegrounds; Alien: Isolation; The Evil Within 2; Outlast 2; Resident Evil 7: Biohazard
The 'Labor of Love' Award	The 'Suspension of Disbelief' Award
Warframe; Crusader Kings II; Path of Exile; Team Fortress 2; Titan Quest	Rocket League; Goat Simulator; Saints Row IV; South Park: The Fractured but Whole; Wolfenstein II: The New Colossus
'The World Is Grim Enough Let's Just All Get Along' Award	The 'No Apologies' Award
Stardew Valley; Abzû; Cities: Skylines; Slime Rancher; To the Moon	The Witcher; HuniePop; Gothic II; Mount & Blade: Warband; Rust
The 'Defies Description' Award	The 'Cry Havoc And Let Slip The Dogs Of War' Award
Garry's Mod; Antichamber; Doki Doki Literature Club; Pony Island; The Stanley Parable	Just Cause 3; Broforce; Middle-earth: Shadow of War; Red Faction: Guerrilla; Total War: Warhammer II
The 'Haunts My Dreams' Award	The 'Soul of Vitruvius' Award
Counter-Strike: Global Offensive; Dark Souls III; Dota 2; Factorio; Sid Meier's Civilization VI	Rise of the Tomb Raider; Bayonetta; Hellblade: Senua's Sacrifice; I am Bread; Nier: Automata
The 'Whoooaaaaaaa, Dude! 2.0' Award	The 'Best Soundtrack' Award (community created)
The Evil Within 2; Antichamber; CPU Invaders; Hotline Miami; Luna	Cuphead; Crypt of the NecroDancer; Nier: Automata; Transistor; Undertale
The 'Even Better Than I Expected' Award
Cuphead; Assassin's Creed Origins; Call of Duty: WWII; Hollow Knight; Sonic Mania

=== 2018 ===
The nomination process began on November 21, 2018. Finalists were revealed in December, with the winners announced during a live broadcast on Steam.tv on February 8, 2019. 2018 Steam Awards introduced the "Game of the Year" category.

The "Game of the Year" Award	The "VR Game of the Year" Award
PlayerUnknown's Battlegrounds; Assassin's Creed Odyssey; Hitman 2; Kingdom Come: Deliverance; Monster Hunter: World	The Elder Scrolls V: Skyrim VR; Beat Saber; Fallout 4 VR; Superhot VR; VRChat
The "Labor of Love" Award	The "Best Developer" Award
Grand Theft Auto V; Dota 2; No Man's Sky; Path of Exile; Stardew Valley	CD Projekt Red; Bandai Namco Entertainment; Bethesda; Capcom; Digital Extremes; Klei; Paradox Interactive; Rockstar Games; Square Enix; Ubisoft
The "Best Environment" Award	The "Better With Friends" Award
The Witcher 3: Wild Hunt; Dark Souls III; Far Cry 5; Shadow of the Tomb Raider; Subnautica	Tom Clancy's Rainbow Six Siege; Counter-Strike: Global Offensive; Dead by Daylight; Overcooked! 2; Payday 2
The "Best Alternate History" Award	The "Most Fun with a Machine" Award
Assassin's Creed Odyssey; Civilization VI; Fallout 4; Hearts of Iron IV; Wolfenstein II: The New Colossus	Rocket League; Euro Truck Simulator 2; Factorio; Nier: Automata; Space Engineers

=== 2019 ===
The nomination process began on November 26, 2019. Finalists were revealed starting on December 11, 2019, with one category a day. Unlike previous years, eligibility for awards was restricted by release date, with only games released after November 2018 able to be nominated, except for the "Labor of Love" category. Users were able to vote from December 19–31, with the winners announced on the final day.

The "Game of the Year" Award	The "VR Game of the Year" Award
Sekiro: Shadows Die Twice; Destiny 2; Devil May Cry 5; Resident Evil 2; Star Wars Jedi: Fallen Order	Beat Saber; Blade and Sorcery; Borderlands 2 VR; Five Nights at Freddy's: Help Wanted; Gorn
The "Labor of Love" Award	The "Better With Friends" Award
Grand Theft Auto V; Counter-Strike: Global Offensive; Dota 2; Tom Clancy's Rainbow Six Siege; Warframe	DayZ; Age of Empires II: Definitive Edition; Dota Underlords; Ring of Elysium; Risk of Rain 2
The "Most Innovative Gameplay" Award	The "Outstanding Story-Rich Game" Award
My Friend Pedro; Baba Is You; Oxygen Not Included; Planet Zoo; Slay the Spire	A Plague Tale: Innocence; Disco Elysium; Far Cry New Dawn; Gears 5; GreedFall
The "Best Game You Suck At" Award	The "Outstanding Visual Style" Award
Mortal Kombat 11; Code Vein; Hunt: Showdown; Mordhau; Remnant: From the Ashes	Gris; Astroneer; Katana Zero; Subnautica: Below Zero; Total War: Three Kingdoms

=== 2020 ===
The nomination process began on November 25, 2020, with winners announced on January 3, 2021. Nominees for each category were announced daily starting on December 17, 2020, with voting commencing between December 22 and January 3.

Game of the Year Award	VR Game of the Year
Red Dead Redemption 2; Death Stranding; Doom Eternal; Fall Guys; Hades	Half-Life: Alyx; Phasmophobia; Star Wars: Squadrons; The Room VR: A Dark Matter; Thief Simulator
Labor of Love Award	Better With Friends
Counter-Strike: Global Offensive; Among Us; No Man's Sky; Terraria; The Witcher 3: Wild Hunt	Fall Guys; Borderlands 3; Deep Rock Galactic; Risk of Rain 2; Sea of Thieves
Outstanding Visual Style Award	Most Innovative Gameplay Award
Ori and the Will of the Wisps; Battlefield V; Black Mesa; Marvel's Avengers; There Is No Game: Jam Edition 2015	Death Stranding; Control; Noita; Superliminal; Teardown
Best Game You Suck At Award	Best Soundtrack Award
Apex Legends; Crusader Kings III; FIFA 21; GTFO; Ghostrunner	Doom Eternal; Halo: The Master Chief Collection; Helltaker; Need for Speed Heat; Persona 4 Golden
Outstanding Story-Rich Award	Sit Back and Relax Award
Red Dead Redemption 2; Detroit: Become Human; Horizon Zero Dawn; Mafia: Definitive Edition; Metro Exodus	The Sims 4; Factorio; Microsoft Flight Simulator; Satisfactory; Untitled Goose Game

=== 2021 ===
Nominees were announced on December 22, 2021, with voting commencing until January 3, 2022.

Game of the Year	VR Game of the Year
Resident Evil Village; Cyberpunk 2077; Forza Horizon 5; New World; Valheim	Cooking Simulator VR; Blair Witch VR; I Expect You to Die 2: The Spy and the Liar; Medal of Honor: Above and Beyond; Sniper Elite VR
Labor of Love	Better With Friends
Terraria; Apex Legends; Dota 2; No Man's Sky; Rust	It Takes Two; Back 4 Blood; Crab Game; Halo Infinite; Valheim
Outstanding Visual Style	Most Innovative Gameplay
Forza Horizon 5; Bright Memory: Infinite; Little Nightmares 2; Psychonauts 2; Subnautica: Below Zero	Deathloop; 12 Minutes; Inscryption; Loop Hero; Moncage
Best Game You Suck At	Best Soundtrack
Nioh 2; Age of Empires 4; Battlefield 2042; Naraka: Bladepoint; World War Z: Aftermath	Marvel's Guardians of the Galaxy; Demon Slayer: Kimetsu no Yaiba – The Hinokami Chronicles; Guilty Gear: Strive; Nier Replicant; Persona 5 Strikers
Outstanding Story-Rich Game	Sit Back and Relax
Cyberpunk 2077; Days Gone; Life Is Strange: True Colors; Mass Effect: Legendary Edition; Resident Evil Village	Farming Simulator 22; Dorfromantik; Potion Craft: Alchemist Simulator; Townscaper; Unpacking

=== 2022 ===
The nomination process took place from November 22–29, 2022. Nominees were announced on December 18, 2022, with the voting process taking place from December 22–29 while the winners were announced on January 3, 2023.

Game of the Year	VR Game of the Year
Elden Ring; Call of Duty: Modern Warfare II; Dying Light 2 Stay Human; God of War; Stray	Hitman 3; Among Us VR; Bonelab; Green Hell VR; Inside the Backrooms
Labor of Love	Better With Friends
Cyberpunk 2077; Deep Rock Galactic; Dota 2; No Man's Sky; Project Zomboid	Raft; Call of Duty: Modern Warfare II; Monster Hunter Rise; MultiVersus; Ready or Not
Outstanding Visual Style	Most Innovative Gameplay
Marvel's Spider-Man: Miles Morales; Bendy and the Dark Revival; Cult of the Lamb; Kena: Bridge of Spirits; Scorn	Stray; Dome Keeper; Mount & Blade II: Bannerlord; Neon White; Teardown
Best Game You Suck At	Best Soundtrack
Elden Ring; FIFA 23; GTFO; Total War: Warhammer III; Victoria 3	Final Fantasy VII Remake Intergrade; Hatsune Miku: Project DIVA MegaMix+; Metal: Hellsinger; Persona 5 Royal; Sonic Frontiers
Outstanding Story-Rich Game	Sit Back and Relax
God of War; A Plague Tale: Requiem; Marvel's Spider-Man; The Stanley Parable: Ultra Deluxe; Uncharted: Legacy of Thieves Collection	Lego Star Wars: The Skywalker Saga; Disney Dreamlight Valley; Dorfromantik; PowerWash Simulator; Slime Rancher 2
Best Game on the Go
Death Stranding Director's Cut; Brotato; Marvel Snap; Vampire Survivors; Yu-Gi-Oh! Master Duel

=== 2023 ===
The nomination process took place from November 21–28, 2023. Nominees were announced on December 17, with the voting process taking place from December 21, 2023 to January 2, 2024. Journalists highlighted some winners, such as Red Dead Redemption 2 (awarded for ongoing support despite the game receiving no major updates since 2020) and Starfield (awarded for innovation despite being received poorly on Steam); some suspected the votes were sarcastic or ironic, while others considered them a symptom of fan voting. Some Pizza Tower fans criticized that The Last of Us Part I—a remake of a 2013 game—won Best Soundtrack.

Game of the Year	VR Game of the Year
Baldur's Gate 3; EA Sports FC 24; Hogwarts Legacy; Lethal Company; Resident Evil 4	Labyrinthine; F1 23; Ghosts of Tabor; Gorilla Tag; I Expect You To Die 3
Labor of Love	Better With Friends
Red Dead Redemption 2; Apex Legends; Deep Rock Galactic; Dota 2; Rust	Lethal Company; Party Animals; Sons of the Forest; Sunkenland; Warhammer 40,000: Darktide
Outstanding Visual Style	Most Innovative Gameplay
Atomic Heart; Cocoon; Darkest Dungeon II; High on Life; Inward	Starfield; Contraband Police; Remnant 2; Shadows of Doubt; Your Only Move Is HUSTLE
Best Game You Suck At	Best Soundtrack
Sifu; EA Sports FC 24; Lords of the Fallen; Overwatch 2; Street Fighter 6	The Last of Us Part I; Chants of Sennaar; Hi-Fi Rush; Persona 5 Tactica; Pizza Tower
Outstanding Story-Rich Game	Sit Back and Relax
Baldur's Gate 3; Lies of P; Love is all Around; Resident Evil 4; Star Wars Jedi: Survivor	Dave the Diver; Cities: Skylines II; Coral Island; Potion Craft; Train Sim World 4
Best Game on Steam Deck
Hogwarts Legacy; Brotato; Diablo IV; Dredge; The Outlast Trials

=== 2024 ===
The nomination process took place from November 27 to December 4, 2024. Nominees were announced on December 17, with the voting process taking place from December 19 to December 31.

Game of the Year	VR Game of the Year
Black Myth: Wukong; Balatro; Helldivers 2; S.T.A.L.K.E.R. 2: Heart of Chornobyl; Warhammer 40,000: Space Marine 2	Metro Awakening VR; Blade and Sorcery; Davigo; Five Nights at Freddy's: Help Wanted 2; Maestro
Labor of Love	Better With Friends
Elden Ring; Baldur's Gate 3; Dota 2; No Man's Sky; Stardew Valley	Helldivers 2; Palworld; Satisfactory; Sons of the Forest; Warhammer 40,000: Space Marine 2
Outstanding Visual Style	Most Innovative Gameplay
Silent Hill 2; Hades II; Metaphor: ReFantazio; Neva; Nine Sols	Liar's Bar; Balatro; Helldivers 2; Satisfactory; S.T.A.L.K.E.R. 2: Heart of Chornobyl
Best Game You Suck At	Best Soundtrack
Black Myth: Wukong; Dragon Ball: Sparking! Zero; The Finals; Ghost of Tsushima: Director's Cut; Tekken 8	Red Dead Redemption; Fate/stay night Remastered; Frostpunk 2; Horizon Forbidden West: Complete Edition; Silent Hill 2
Outstanding Story-Rich Game	Sit Back and Relax
Black Myth: Wukong; Final Fantasy XVI; Ghost of Tsushima: Director's Cut; Mouthwashing; S.T.A.L.K.E.R. 2: Heart of Chornobyl	Farming Simulator 25; House Flipper 2; Tiny Glade; TCG Card Shop Simulator; Webfishing
Best Game on Steam Deck
God of War Ragnarök; Balatro; Deep Rock Galactic: Survivor; Hades II; Warhammer 40,000: Rogue Trader

=== 2025 ===
The nomination process took place from November 24 to December 1, 2025. Nominees were announced on December 18, with the voting process taking place from December 18, 2025 to January 3, 2026.

Game of the Year	VR Game of the Year
Hollow Knight: Silksong; ARC Raiders; Clair Obscur: Expedition 33; Dispatch; Kingdom Come: Deliverance II	The Midnight Walk; Pavlov; Emissary Zero; F1 25; Le Mans Ultimate
Labor of Love	Better With Friends
Baldur's Gate III; Helldivers II; No Man's Sky; Rust; Dota 2	Peak; Split Fiction; R.E.P.O.; Schedule One; Battlefield 6
Outstanding Visual Style	Most Innovative Gameplay
Silent Hill f; My Little Puppy; Final Fantasy VII Rebirth; ENA: Dream BBQ; Doom: The Dark Ages	ARC Raiders; Europa Universalis V; Mage Arena; Escape from Duckov; Blue Prince
Best Game You Suck At	Best Soundtrack
Hollow Knight: Silksong; Where Winds Meet; Path of Exile 2; Elden Ring Nightreign; Marvel Rivals	Clair Obscur: Expedition 33; Deltarune; Rift of the NecroDancer; Marvel's Spider-Man 2; Tokyo Xtreme Racer
Outstanding Story-Rich Game	Sit Back and Relax
Dispatch; The Last of Us Part II Remastered; Dying Light: The Beast; Kingdom Come: Deliverance II; No, I'm Not a Human	RV There Yet?; Megabonk; Chill with You: Lo-Fi Story; Slime Rancher 2; PowerWash Simulator 2
Best Game on Steam Deck
Hades II; Digimon Story: Time Stranger; Ball x Pit; CloverPit; Deep Rock Galactic: Survivor
