= Your Only Move Is Hustle =

2023 turn-based fighting video game

- Developer: Ivy Sly
- Publisher: Ivy Sly
- Platform: Windows
- Release: February 2, 2023
- Genres: Fighting, turn-based strategy
- Modes: Single-player, multiplayer

Your Only Move Is Hustle is a 2023 turn-based fighting game developed and published by Ivy Sly. Released for Microsoft Windows on February 2, 2023, the game combines traditional two-dimensional fighting game mechanics with turn-based strategy.

== Gameplay ==
Your Only Move Is Hustle is a two-dimensional fighting game in which players select actions from a list of available moves, including attacks, movement, and defensive maneuvers. Unlike conventional fighting games, combat pauses while players choose their actions, allowing them to preview potential outcomes before committing to a move. The selected actions are then executed simultaneously.

== Reception ==
GameSpot included the game in its list of the best PC games of 2023. The game was also nominated for the Most Innovative Gameplay award at the 2023 Steam Awards.

PC Gamer described the game as a turn-based reinterpretation of the fighting genre, highlighting the ability to create elaborate combat sequences without requiring the reflexes typically associated with fighting games.
