= Codename: Ocean Keeper =

2025 survival roguelike video game

Ocean Keeper: Dome Survival
- Developer: RetroStyle Games
- Publisher: RetroStyle Games
- Platforms: Windows, macOS, Linux
- Release: Early access: 2024; Full release: May 2025
- Genres: Roguelike, survival
- Mode: Single-player

Ocean Keeper: Dome Survival, initially titled Codename: Ocean Keeper, is a survival roguelike video game developed by the Ukrainian studio RetroStyle Games. It combines "bullet-heaven" gameplay in the style of Vampire Survivors with underwater mining. Released in early access in 2024, it received a 1.0 release in May 2025.

== Gameplay ==
The player controls a mech spider on the floor of an ocean planet, alternating between top-down combat against waves of sea creatures and underground sequences in which they leave the mech to dive into caves and mine resources. Resources are used to upgrade weapons and the mech between runs.

== Development and release ==
Ocean Keeper is the first PC title developed by RetroStyle Games, a studio otherwise known for art outsourcing. In an interview with Game*Spark, the developers said the concept came from imagining a roguelike set entirely underwater, and described the game as a science-fiction successor to their earlier mobile title Last Pirate: Survival Island. A demo appeared during Steam Next Fest in June 2024, the game entered early access later that year, and the 1.0 version was released in May 2025 for Windows, macOS and Linux.

== Reception ==
In a preview of the demo, Destructoid praised the concept but criticised the repetitive combat audio.
