= Deep Rock Galactic: Rogue Core =

Upcoming video game

- Developer: Ghost Ship Games
- Publishers: Ghost Ship Publishing; Coffee Stain Publishing
- Director: Mikkel Martin Pederson
- Designer: Mike Akopyan
- Composer: Sophus Alf Agerbæk-Larsen
- Series: Deep Rock Galactic
- Engine: Unreal Engine 5
- Platform: Windows
- Release: 20 May 2026 (early access)
- Genres: First-person shooter, roguelite
- Modes: Multiplayer, single-player

Deep Rock Galactic: Rogue Core is an upcoming cooperative roguelike first-person shooter game developed by Ghost Ship Games and published by Ghost Ship Publishing and Coffee Stain Publishing. It is the second spin-off of 2020 video game Deep Rock Galactic, following Deep Rock Galactic: Survivor in 2025. It was launched in early access for Windows on May 20, 2026.

Like its predecessor, Rogue Core is set on the alien planet Hoxxes IV, on which the titular Deep Rock Galactic corporation has established deep mining operations. The player controls an elite dwarven crisis specialist known as a Reclaimer, who has been employed by the company after they mysteriously lost contact with all mining facilities. On each mission, the player and up to three teammates venture into an abandoned mine overrun with alien enemies known as Corespawn, whom they must fight off while progressing into deeper levels and unlocking new weapons and abilities. Players must ultimately defeat a boss battle at the deepest level to successfully reclaim the facility.

The early access launch has received generally positive reviews. It has been praised by critics for its faithfulness to the original game's strengths while branching out into a new subgenre. Reviews were initially mixed at launch due to issues regarding upgrade negotiation, which have since been addressed in updates. It is expected to remain in early access for 18 to 24 months from launch.

== Gameplay ==
Deep Rock Galactic: Rogue Core is a cooperative first-person shooter featuring fully destructible, procedurally generated cave systems in which players must mine valuable resources and complete mission objectives while fighting hordes of alien enemies. Its fundamental gameplay closely mirrors the original Deep Rock Galactic, but differs with the inclusion of roguelike elements. The game has five playable classes—Guardian, Spotter, Falconer, Slicer, and Retcon—who each have unique special abilities, but unlike in Deep Rock Galactic, do not have individual weapon loadouts. Weapons, equipment and other abilities are instead unlocked over the course of a mission, starting from scratch each time.

In teams of up to four, players select a mission from aboard the Ramrod—a spaceship serving as the game's lobby—then board a drop pod to be launched into planet Hoxxes IV. They arrive at the first level of an underground mining facility, which the company has lost contact with following a mysterious event called the Greyout. Barrier drones must be assembled to breach the Greyout barrier and gain access to the facility. Inside, each player is given a choice of one weapon, one traversal tool (such as a zipline launcher or grappling hook), and one grenade type. Many of the available equipment options are directly carried over from Deep Rock Galactic. They must then follow a large cable through procedural cave systems leading to a freight elevator, which they must activate to progress to the next level.

Along the way, players must avoid environmental hazards and fight off hordes of hostile wildlife native to the planet. The primary family of enemies is known as the Corespawn; crawling humanoid creatures from the planet's core who have overtaken the mining facilities. Each enemy variant has different modes of attack as well as weak spots that can be targeted to deal extra damage.

Each mission level has a time limit to reach the elevator, and enemy difficulty scales with the amount of time elapsed. To keep up with the rising difficulty, players have several ways to increase their power with new upgrades and equipment. The primary mode of upgrading is by mining Expenite—a valuable, glowing green mineral with "transformative properties" that the facilities were built to extract. Players may use their pickaxe to mine deposits of Expenite found naturally in the cave walls, or find quantities of it throughout the facility structures by operating heavy equipment in various mini events.
