= ENA: Dream BBQ =

- Developer: ENA Team
- Publisher: Joel G
- Engine: Unity
- Platforms: Linux; macOS; Windows
- Release: March 27, 2025
- Genres: Exploration; adventure; puzzle
- Mode: Single-player

ENA: Dream BBQ is a 2025 episodic exploration adventure game developed by ENA Team and published by Joel Guerra. It follows ENA, (Note: Pronounced /ˈɛnə/, EH-nə) a humanoid being who explores various environments while interacting with other characters, completing in-game tasks, navigating mazes, and solving puzzles in an effort to reach the Boss, a mysterious figure central to the narrative.

The game's first chapter, titled "Lonely Door", was released for Linux, macOS, and Windows on March 27, 2025. More chapters are in development and are planned to be released as downloadable content. The game was widely described as surreal by reviewers.

== Gameplay ==
ENA: Dream BBQ is an exploration adventure game (Note: ENA: Dream BBQ has been described as either an exploration or adventure game, or both, by reviewers. Some reviewers say it is an adventure game while others say it is an exploration game (or similar). Viraaj Bhatgnar of Game Rant says it is both an exploration and adventure game.) set in the first person. The player controls a humanoid named ENA and, while exploring different areas, is presented with various objectives through her, which are accessible through the game's interface. Throughout the story, the gameplay incorporates character interaction, maze navigation, puzzle solving, and platforming. A minigame is included as a segment within a certain task assigned during gameplay. Tasks become available following interactions with specific non-player characters.

== Plot ==
ENA, together with her employer, Froggy

The game's main protagonist, ENA, is a humanoid with two distinct personalities. Her body is divided into two sides: her red "salesperson" side, and her white "meanie" side. Throughout the game, ENA's appearance may radically change.

=== Chapter 1 – "Lonely Door" ===
The game begins in the Red Outworld, where ENA finds a blue bed that sends her to the Hub. There, she encounters Froggy, her employer, who tells her she must find the Boss. (Note: Throughout the game, numerous characters claim to be the Boss. However, some of the characters retract their statement and ENA denies the characters' claims of being the Boss in all cases.) Smoke fills the Hub, Froggy allergically reacts, and ENA is tasked with clearing it. She finds the Receptionist, who says the way to clear the smoke is by finding a Genie. After the conversation, ENA enters the Lonely Door and arrives at the Uncanny Streets. She encounters the Shaman, who says the Genie is on a floating island. To get there, she must create a Humanboard, which requires access to the Northern Gorge beyond a bridge. ENA meets Hoarder Alex, who tasks her with blocking the vision of a man overlooking him, likely planning to steal his items.

After blocking the man's vision, ENA crosses the bridge, finds a witch and after reuniting her with her sisters, receives the Motherboard and brings it to the Shaman, who turns it into the Humanboard, which is used to reach the Floating Island. Upon reaching the island, ENA enters a portal and is sent to the Orb, where she is eaten by a gray head, sending her to the Core. She crosses a river and enters the Bathroom to find Theodora, the Genie of the Lonely Door, who grants her an aspiration. She chooses the aspiration of removing the smoke, (Note: Theodora allows ENA to choose one of five different aspirations, although she will only fulfill the one to remove the smoke, as other aspirations are rejected.) accesses the Smoke Room, and destroys the Smoke Machine. After leaving the room, she enters the Outworld, an abstracted Uncanny Streets. She finds the Lonely Door and tries exiting, but it is closed. She is then covered with crystal-like growths, after which a mannequin emerges from her body and is pulled into an abyss by a giant hand. A mannequin in the Hub turns into ENA, resurrecting her.

==== Alternate routes ====
ENA can instead go to the Purge Event, which Froggy describes as a "dangerous and illegal party". To access the Purge Event, she finds the head of the Taxi Driver by solving a maze. She then enters the nearby taxi, which the Taxi Driver picks up and places in a new part of the Uncanny Streets, where the Purge Event can be found. At the Purge Event, after talking with one of the special characters who serve as a trigger, she is transported into a labyrinth, where she is transformed into a whistle-like creature. After finishing the labyrinth, ENA enters the Core, where the further events are the same.

If ENA falls into the white river in the Core, she is taken to the Lost Village. The village consists of a group of buildings, where she finds and enters the right building, which takes her to a long corridor leading to a broken body of Theodora, who is said to be "the former Genie of these lands". After talking to the Theodora, ENA is taken to the Smoke Room and the path to the ending will be the same as other routes.

== Development ==
The game is based on the web series ENA (sometimes stylized and formatted as ƎNA), created by Peruvian animator Joel Guerra and published on the video-sharing platform YouTube in 2020. Set in abnormal environments, the retro-style animated series follows ENA, whose voice and face shifts with her emotional state. The animated series is inspired by the webcore aesthetic and was influenced by the 1998 game LSD: Dream Emulator. The titular character was inspired by Pablo Picasso's painting Girl before a Mirror and works by Brazilian artist Romero Britto. (Note: Joel G (June 4, 2020). ENA. Archived from the original on April 21, 2025 – via YouTube. Video description.) The series partnered with Fangamer to produce official merchandise of the project in the US. By 2023, Guerra's YouTube channel accumulated 900,000 subscribers.

ENA: Dream BBQ was announced on September 23, 2021. The initial release date for the first chapter was planned for December 2022, but was later postponed to 2023 for further development of the game. The official trailer of the game was shown on January 28, 2023. The first chapter of ENA: Dream BBQ, titled "Lonely Door", was launched for PC via Steam on March 27, 2025. The game has voice acting in various languages besides English, including Greek, Italian, Japanese, and Russian. Some in-game characters are inspired by different aspects of certain cultures, such as that of France, Korea, and Peru.

The first chapter of the game can be played for free, but there is also a Supporter Edition Upgrade that can be bought as downloadable content. The Supporter Edition includes unlockable additional content to the game, such as pre-production animations, in-development screenshots, developer commentary, and concept art. The content can be accessed by obtaining hidden collectable items, spread throughout the game. The Supporter Edition does not include access to future chapters of ENA: Dream BBQ, which are planned to be purchasable separately.

On February 24, 2026, Joel Guerra published a trailer for the upcoming animated project Dating Oblivion on his YouTube page. He said that development for the next chapter of ENA: Dream BBQ is still ongoing in 2026.

== Reception ==
ENA: Dream BBQ has been widely described by critics and journalists as surreal. Dominic Tarason of PC Gamer wrote that the game preserved the "kaleidoscopic blend of aesthetics and animation styles" from the original ENA series and described its world as being more immersive and its characters as more remarkable, but felt the description of "walking simulator" would be too reductive of the experience. Characterizing the game as "essentially an interactive acid trip", PCGamesN's Jamie Hore noted that the experience had a mix of platforming, puzzle solving, and some exploration, which made it difficult to determine the game's genre.

Upon launch, the concurrent player count reached almost 11,000 players. It was greeted with an "overwhelmingly positive" response, a designation for the highest quality games on Steam, collecting over 18,000 reviews less than a month after its release, with 98% of reviews being positive. Viraaj Bhatnagar of Game Rant wrote that the reviews showed the game was "one of the most well-received titles overall in 2025". Video game consultant Jordan Oloman wrote Postmode that "Dream BBQ is an ode to imaginational indulgence, and by far the best game I’ve played this year", rating the game 10/10. Yusuke Sonta of Automaton Media stated that the game's popularity soon resembled that of the animated series, and the multi-language voice cast helped users enjoy the game despite language barriers. According to Russian internet journal VGTimes, ENA: Dream BBQ was the eighth-most subscribed game on Steam with almost 30,000 followers as of March 27, 2025. On March 30, 2025, Undertale and Deltarune developer Toby Fox recommended the game on Bluesky.

=== Awards ===
Year	Award	Category	Result	Ref.
2026	The Steam Awards 2025	Outstanding Visual Style	Nominated	
