= Kill the Brickman =

2025 video game

- Developer: Doonutsaur
- Publisher: Poncle
- Platforms: Windows, Xbox One, Xbox Series
- Release: WW: 21 August 2025
- Genre: Puzzle
- Mode: Single-player

Kill the Brickman is a 2025 video game developed by Doonutsaur and published by Poncle for Windows, Xbox One and Xbox Series. It is a brick breaker themed puzzle game in which players use a firearm to shoot bricks across a series of levels. The game was the first to be developed the studio, and the first title published by Poncle, also an independent developer. Upon release, Kill the Brickman received generally favorable reviews, with praise directed to the game's offbeat tone and innovations on the brick breaker genre, and criticism to its pacing and progression.

== Gameplay ==
Gameplay

Kill the Brickman is a brick breaker title in which the objective of the game is to eliminate a certain number of descending blocks from the screen in a level. Enemy blocks damage the player, reducing the eight lives of the player; when the lives reach zero, the game is over. Players fire projectiles from the bottom of the screen from a firearm: the clips of the weapon affect the number of shots and their effects, and the bullet type affects the strength, rebound and damage of the shot. Players are required to eliminate the required number of blocks within a set number of turns. The game features four missions, divided across ten stages, featuring a boss every five stages. The appearance of blocks in a stage is randomly configured. Before starting a stage, players an accept a choice of offers that provide an additional benefit during the game. Stages may have additional win conditions, such as to eliminate specific blocks, or featuring buildings with positive or negative effects.

== Development and release ==
Kill the Brickman is the first title developed by Doonutsaur, a United States based development team. The game was also the first published by Poncle, a UK development studio that created Vampire Survivors, with the studio providing support and advice to Doonutsaur during the development process. Poncle designer Luca Galante stated the decision to enter publishing came from a desire to create "genuine games" that support independent developers with smaller projects. The game was announced at the Gamescom Xbox showcase in 2025, and was released on 21 August 2025. In September 2025, Doonutsaur provided an update titled Bricktackular that introduced additional features, including a save feature available during runs of the game, dynamic difficulty modes and support for the Steam Deck.

== Reception ==
Reception

Aggregate score
| Aggregator | Score |
|---|---|
| Metacritic | 79/100 |

Review scores
| Publication | Score |
|---|---|
| The Games Machine (Italy) | 7.5/10 |
| GameReactor | 8/10 |
| Vandal | 7/10 |

Kill the Brickman received "generally favorable" reviews, according to review aggregator platform Metacritic. Describing the game as "one of those simple ideas that's breathtakingly executed and gorgeously presented", Eurogamer commended the game's "eccentric" premise and addictive gameplay. Polygon praised the game's "genuinely enjoyable" premise and "weird" tone, but felt the game's handling on a controller was "clunky" and uncomfortable, had slow pacing, with the author stating they "never felt challenged nor felt the urge to experiment with the game's systems". Vandal stated the game was an "interesting twist" on the brick-breaker genre and "oozes originality", but "lacks balance between roguelike elements and strategy".
