= Vampire Crawlers =

2026 roguelike deck-building game

- Cover art for Vampire Crawlers
- Developers: poncle; Nosebleed Interactive
- Publisher: poncle
- Composers: Yoko Shimomura; Daniele Zandara; Filippo Vicarelli; Michael Coviello
- Series: Vampire Survivors
- Engine: Unity
- Platforms: Nintendo Switch; Nintendo Switch 2; PlayStation 5; macOS; Windows; Xbox Series X/S; iOS; Android
- Release: Windows, macOS, Switch, Switch 2, PS5, Xbox Series X/S: WW: April 21, 2026; iOS, Android: WW: October 12, 2026
- Genre: Roguelike deck-builder
- Mode: Single player

Vampire Crawlers: The Turbo Wildcard from Vampire Survivors is a 2026 roguelike deck-building game co-developed by poncle and Nosebleed Interactive and published by poncle. It is a spin-off of poncle's Vampire Survivors, adapting the action roguelike game into a deck-building one.

== Gameplay ==
Vampire Crawlers is a roguelike deck-building game based on characters, weapons and other concepts from Vampire Survivors. Players start in a village and select one of several combatants ("crawlers") which starts with a basic deck of cards that favor certain weapons or abilities. The player can then select to travel to one of several regions each representing a dungeon, several which have multiple levels with different difficulties.

On entering a dungeon, the game switches to a simple first-person view of the dungeon similar to early computer role-playing games. The player has a map showing all encounters on the dungeon floor include a boss that blocks the exit to the next floor. Beating encounters earns the player experience points, and as they level up, they get the option to add a new card to their deck. New cards also can be found in chests through a dungeon, along with gold, healing items, and other treasures. Each dungeon has a fixed number of floors, and on beating the boss on the final floor, the crawler is intentionally killed by a powerful demon, returning them to town with the gold they had collected. Completion of a specific dungeon typically also provides a permanent reward such as a new card type they can find, a new region to explore, or an artifact or tarot card that changes how the game is played. Other rewards like new characters can come from completing achievements in the game.

Combat follows typical rules for card-based games; each round, the player receives a random draw of cards from their deck, each card with a mana cost to play out of a limited set of mana for that turn. Once the player completes their turn, any remaining monsters will attack the player. Cards include attack cards that can damage enemies, armor cards that help protect the player from damage, and passive ability cards that increase the player's combat attributes for that combat. There are also cards that represent the crawler selected, which also provide temporary boosts. Though cards can be played in any manner, there are opportunities to play cards to generate damage or boosting multipliers. The game is designed that players can either play cards slowly in a thoughtful approach, or as quickly as the player wants, including the ability to play all available cards within their current mana limit. Cards can have the ability to be set with gems that provide additional abilities when the card is played, such as doing double damage, providing armor, or creating a one-time clone of the card. Like in Vampire Survivors there are also Evolution gems that can be used to upgrade an attack with a buff card as to make a completely new and more powerful attack card.

== Development ==
Luca "poncle" Galante released Vampire Survivors in October 2022 as a solo project, wherein its success, critically and financially, allowed Galante to establish poncle as a studio. Though the studio had initially established "poncle presents" as a publishing label to support other indie titles, by April 2026, the studio had shifted focus to both spin-offs and licensed variations of Vampire Survivors, along with new intellectual properties.

Galante felt that there was much he could reuse from Vampire Survivors in terms of the characters, weapons, and other assets to develop more games. Early on, there were five separate projects in development, with poncle working with other indie studios to create prototypes for game in other genres related loosely to the content from Vampire Survivors, include a role-playing game. One of the directions Galante said he wanted to do was to "take an existing genre and try to remove everything I usually find frustrating about it".

The prototype that became Vampire Crawlers stood out to Galante, as British studio Nosebleed Interactive, "immediately understood the idea, the concept, and so that's the one that progressed", according to Galante, as well as the one that "naturally, organically went faster than any other". For Vampire Crawlers, Galante saw the opportunity to bring the Vampire Survivors approach to the roguelike deck-building genre and specifically speeding up the game instead of waiting for battle animations to play out. He also wanted to expand the game to involve more exploration and a area to explore so that the player had "the feeling that you are moving through a world where a large variety of things could happen, instead of just navigating menus", according to Galante. Galante said the card combat system was the core of the game, "everything else is an accessory; it's an excuse to justify the combat system." The village, Galante said, was "branching out too much", and kept its role in the game simple and easy to expand as the player progressed.

The game was first announced in November 2025. It was released in full on April 21, 2026 for Nintendo Switch and Switch 2, PlayStation 5, Windows and Xbox Series X/S. Galante is also planning a release on mobile platforms, with the iOS port released on October 12, 2026.

== Reception ==
Reception

Aggregate scores
Aggregator	Score
Metacritic	NS: 81/100; PC: 83/100; XSXS: 87/100
OpenCritic	93% recommend (Note: Based on 41 reviews)

Review scores
Publication	Score
Destructoid	9/10
GameSpot	8/10
PC Gamer (US)	50/100

Vampire Crawlers received "generally favorable" reviews according to review aggregator website Metacritic. Review aggregator OpenCritic assessed that the game received "mighty" approval, being recommended by 93% of critics with an average rating of 84/100.
