= Ghosts of Tabor =

2024 video game

- Developer: Combat Waffle Studios
- Publishers: Beyond Frames Entertainment (until 2026); Neem Interactive (since 2026)
- Platforms: Meta Quest 2; Meta Quest 3; Meta Quest 3S; Pico 4; Pico Neo 3; PlayStation VR2
- Release: Early access 2023; Official release February 8, 2024; May 7, 2025 (PSVR2)
- Genre: Extraction shooter
- Modes: player versus player; player versus environment

Ghosts of Tabor is a 2024 extraction shooter developed by Combat Waffle Studios and originally published by Beyond Frames Entertainment, now Neem Interactive. It was released to Meta Quest on February 8, 2024, with it still being listed as early access on Steam as of 2026. The game follows the same style as most extraction shooters, with the two main modes being player versus player (PVP) and player versus environment.

== Gameplay ==
Ghosts of Tabor is a virtual reality extraction shooter where players must explore the environment and find loot, which can consist of weapons, ammunition, consumables, and keycards. During matches the players can encounter enemies who will try to kill them, and they must be taken out. These enemies can also carry loot with them. Every player has a base where they can store gear that they found from raids that can then be used in future raids. The game features two main modes, which are player versus player (PVP) and player versus environment (PVE).

== Release ==
Ghosts of Tabor was announced in late 2022, and it was released on Meta Quest into early access in 2023 and later fully released on February 8, 2024. The game was shown off at UploadVR Showcase Winter 2023 via a trailer. Before fully releasing on Meta Quest, Ghosts of Tabor generated over $3 million in revenue, it was later reported that it then passed $20 million in revenue and then later, $30 million.

It was reported that the game had 100,000 players across Steam and App Lab. It was later released on PICO 4 in May 2024. In May 2025, it was released on PlayStation VR2. In October 2025, a Terminator DLC was released for Halloween. In December 2025, a DLC was released in collaboration with Tom Clancy's Splinter Cell. In July 2026, it was announced that Ghosts of Tabor would be going back to an older build titled "Ghosts of Tabor: Legacy", which is a 2024 build. On July 29, 2026, Beyond Frames Entertainment, the original publishers for Ghosts of Tabor, sold the rights to Neem Interactive in a deal for $1 million alongside three other titles, Silent North, and GRIM.
