= Mage Arena =

Upcoming video game

- Developer: jrsjams
- Publisher: jrsjams
- Engine: Unity
- Platform: Windows
- Release: July 24, 2025 (early access)
- Genre: Action game
- Mode: Multiplayer

Mage Arena is an upcoming cooperative player versus player video game developed and published by jrsjams for Windows via Steam.

== Development ==
The game was first released in early access on July 24, 2025. The game was initially released at a discount price due to the number of bugs present in the game, but the developer plans to increase the price to its original value in the future.

== Gameplay ==
Gameplay screenshot.

In the game, players use voice activated magical spells to fight against other players. The players are divided into two teams: "Sorcerers" and "Warlocks." Examples of common spells include "Fireball", that creates a large projectile, "Freeze", which spawns a small projectile that freezes the hit target, "Magic Missiles", which spawns 3 small projectiles, and "Wormhole", which creates portals that the player can freely travel. Players can unlock new spells during battles by locating Torn Pages, which can be found around the map. Each player or team has a base that contains a flag, the objective being to capture the flag. When a flag is captured, players of that team can no longer respawn.

Players can also craft items using materials from around the map, such as logs, rocks, toads, and crystals. One item is Excalibur, a sword that is able to defeat enemies in one hit.

== Reception ==
In the first week following the game's early access release, the peak player count reached over 16,000 active users, as well as over 2,600 reviews in the first five days. The game gained popularity largely due to websites like TikTok, where videos about Mage Arena achieved millions of views.

=== Awards ===
Year	Award	Category	Result	Ref.
2026	The Steam Awards 2025	Most Innovative Gameplay	Nominated	
