= Viridi =

2015 video game

- Developer: Ice Water Games
- Publisher: Ice Water Games
- Composer: Michael Bell
- Engine: Unity
- Platforms: iOS, Android, Mac OS X, Microsoft Windows
- Release: PC: August 20, 2015 iOS / Android: June 20, 2016
- Genre: Simulation
- Mode: Single-player

Viridi is a simulation video game developed by Ice Water Games. The game was released onto Microsoft Windows and OS X on August 20, 2015, and onto iOS and Android on June 20, 2016. The game tasks players to look after a pot of succulents. The game takes on a freemium model, meaning the game is free-to-play, but contains microtransactions.

== Gameplay ==
Gameplay screenshot.

In Viridi, the player is tasked with looking after a pot full of different varieties of succulents in real-time, while a snail circumnavigates the edge of the pot. The camera angle is changed by dragging the mouse on PC or swiping on mobile. Moving the camera enables the player to view their other succulents. The succulents eventually become "thirsty", requiring the player to water them to become "sated". If watered too much, they become "overwatered" and if the watering continues, they will become "waterlogged" and will die. The player is able to sing to the succulents, resulting in faster growth. The snail can also be sang to and watered, changing its emotion from "wow cute" to something else, including "pleased", and "wet", respectively. Weeds start to grow in the pot and the player is able to remove them by clicking on them.

Microtransactions are included in the game. The shop contains different species of succulents and additional pots and backdrops that the player can purchase. All of the succulents cost $0.99, but depending on the type, the quantity changes with the most being ten and the least being two. Along with the pot full of succulents awarded at the start of the game, each week, a free seedling is given to the player.

== Development and release ==
Ice Water Games initially conceived Viridi as an up-front purchase, giving players access to new plants as they met goals in-game. However, fearing that this made the game "just another chore" instead of a relaxing experience, the developers changed to the free-to-play model as an alternative means of distributing plants over time. "People would play just to unlock the next plant," explained technical lead Kevin Maxon, "which was antithetical to the spirit of the game: we want people to love the plant they have."

Viridi was released onto Steam for Microsoft Windows and OS X on August 20, 2015, and was released onto iOS and Android on June 20, 2016.

Two days before the game's Steam release, on August 18, 2015, the original soundtrack became available on the Steam website as DLC. It contains 16 instrumental tracks from the game in WAV format, which were composed, performed, and mixed by Michael Bell.

== Reception ==
Viridi received mixed reviews from critics. Janine Hawkins of Waypoint called it "a slow burn of a game as much as it is a small, meditative window to somewhere and something else." Rock, Paper, Shotgun's Philippa Warr was critical of the game's payment model, saying that the presence of a real-money shop interfered with Viridi's purpose as a safe haven.

As of 1/9/2017, it has received an overall satisfaction rating of 89% from 4,185 users on Steam, earning a "Very Positive" status. The game was also nominated for the community-created "Sit Back and Relax" award in the 2016 Steam Awards.

== See also ==
- Eidolon, another game by the same developers
