= Slime Rancher =

2017 video game by monomi Park

- Developer: Monomi Park
- Publisher: Monomi Park (Note: Console version by Skybound Games, Mobile version by Playdigious)
- Director: Nick Popovich
- Designer: Chris Lum
- Artists: Ian McConville; Victoria Joh
- Composer: Harry Mack
- Engine: Unity
- Platforms: Windows; macOS; Linux; Xbox One; PlayStation 4; Nintendo Switch; iOS; Android
- Release: PC, Xbox One; August 2, 2017; PlayStation 4; August 22, 2018; Nintendo Switch; August 12, 2021; Android, iOS; May 26, 2026
- Genre: Farm life sim
- Mode: Single-player

Slime Rancher is a farm life sim video game developed and published by American indie studio Monomi Park. The game was released as an early access title in January 2016, with an official release on Windows, macOS, Linux and Xbox One on August 2, 2017. A PlayStation 4 version was released on August 22, 2018, and a Nintendo Switch version was released on August 12, 2021. A DLC named Secret Style Pack' was released on June 19, 2019 which added additional cosmetic appearances. A sequel, Slime Rancher 2, was released in early access on September 23, 2022, for Windows and Xbox Series X/S and was officially released on 23 September 2025. A feature film adaptation is in development.

== Gameplay ==
The game is played in an open world and from a first-person perspective. The player controls a character named Beatrix LeBeau, a rancher who moves to a planet far from Earth called the Far Far Range to live the life of a "slime rancher", which consists of constructing her ranch and exploring the world of the Far Far Range in order to collect, raise, feed, and breed slimes. Slimes are gelatinous living organisms of various sizes and characteristics. To progress she has notes left by the former owner of the ranch that help her on her journey through the Far Far Range.

The game's main economic aspect revolves around feeding slimes the appropriate food items so that they produce "plorts", which can then be sold in exchange for Newbucks, which can be used to purchase upgrades to the rancher's equipment or farm buildings. With the exception of the basic pink slime, slimes will only eat one of the three types of food; fruit, veggie, or meat. Each slime also has a favorite food, which will lead the slime to produce twice the amount of plorts when eaten. The player moves the character around a variety of environments and is able to collect a variety of slimes, food items, and plorts by sucking them up with their vacuum tool (called a "Vacpack", a portmanteau of vacuum and backpack). They can only store a limited number of items and item types at a time and must unload their collected items before being able to collect more. The player must buy and upgrade various enclosures to house their collected slimes and farms for storing their food. Upgrades can also be aesthetic upgrades to the character's home, Vacpack, and the ranch itself.

In-game screenshot showing the VacPack nozzle, a few "Pink" slimes, and a "plort" (lower-left)

Two types of slimes can be combined and enlarged by feeding a slime a plort from another species, making them noticeably larger, combining their physical characteristics, and allowing them to produce two plorts when fed, one plort of each of their base slimes. They also share the favorite food of each of their base slimes. These hybrid slimes are known as "Largos". However, if a Largo slime consumes a plort different from either species of slime it is made of, it becomes an aggressive malevolent black slime called the "Tarr", which converts attacked slimes around it to Tarrs, as well as being able to damage the player. The player can pump fresh water from ponds and springs to splash and disintegrate the Tarrs.

There are different kinds of slimes in the game, each species differing in traits, ranging in complexity from simple ears, colors, wings, and tails, to the ability to teleport or grab items via a vine that emerges from the ground. Some of the types of slimes available in game include docile, harmful, non-farmable, and feral. Most slimes also have a "Gordo" version of themselves, which can be found in various hidden areas across the Far Far Range. These Gordos are extremely large and cannot move around like regular or Largo slimes. Players can shoot food items at them until they explode (50 of their food type, or 25 of their favorite food), leaving behind normal versions of the Gordo slime's species and crates containing random loot and either a teleporter or "slime key" which allow access to new areas or shortcuts between known areas.

== Development ==
Development of Slime Rancher started in Popovich's apartment. As Popovich was an artist and designer rather than a programmer, he relied on other people's code to create a prototype of the game. He eventually enlisted technical director Mike Thomas to help with the programming. They worked on the game for eight hours a day, a practice Popovich used with employees of Monomi Park to avoid crunch.

The game was initially due to enter early access after a year but was delayed by six months.

== Reception ==
Slime Rancher

Aggregate score
Aggregator	Score
Metacritic	PC: 81/100; XONE: 80/100; PS4: 69/100

Review scores
Publication	Score
Destructoid	8.5/10
Game Informer	8.5/10
PC Gamer (UK)	65%
New Game Network	77/100

The Early Access version of the Slime Rancher received generally positive reviews. Heather Alexandra from Kotaku noticed some bugs, but gave the game a positive review, saying that "I'm not usually a fan of games with catharsis but when I return to my bright and goofy farm at the end of the day? I can't help but smile as wide as my slimy little friends."^{[sic]} Steve Neilsen from Games Mojo awarded it 4.5 out of 5 stars, stating that "Slime Rancher is fun and addictive game, with a fun premise and cute creatures. The cartoon style graphics look amazing, and gameplay is clever and full of cute."

The full release of the game received generally favorable reviews according to review aggregator Metacritic, with reviewers saying it had the ability to keep you hooked for hours. Reviewers also said it was relaxing and cathartic, but quite repetitive, and that it successfully taps into the addictive nature of farming simulators.

By May 2017, the game had sold over 800,000 copies. By February 28, 2019, the game had sold 2 million copies. By January 14, 2022, the game had sold over 5 million copies.

In Game Informer's Reader's Choice Best of 2017 Awards, the game tied in third place along with Forza Motorsport 7 for "Best Microsoft Game", while it came in second place for "Best Simulation Game". The website also gave it the award for the latter category in their Best of 2017 Awards.

=== Accolades ===
Award nominations for Slime Rancher
Year	Award	Category	Result	Ref.
2017	Golden Joystick Awards	Best Indie Game	Nominated	
2017	Golden Joystick Awards	Xbox Game of the Year	Nominated	
2017	The Game Awards 2017	Best Debut Indie Game	Nominated	
2018	National Academy of Video Game Trade Reviewers Awards	Game, Original Action	Nominated	
2018	National Academy of Video Game Trade Reviewers Awards	Game, Simulation	Nominated	
2018	14th British Academy Games Awards	Debut Game	Nominated	

== Film adaptation ==
In August 2023, Deadline reported that a film adaptation of the video game was in the works within Dmitri M. Johnson and Mike Goldberg's Story Kitchen.

== Sequel ==
Slime Rancher 2 released in early access on September 22, 2022, with a version 1.0 full release for Xbox Series X/S and Windows via the Microsoft Store, and PlayStation 5 released on September 23, 2025.
