= Pico 4 =

Virtual reality headset

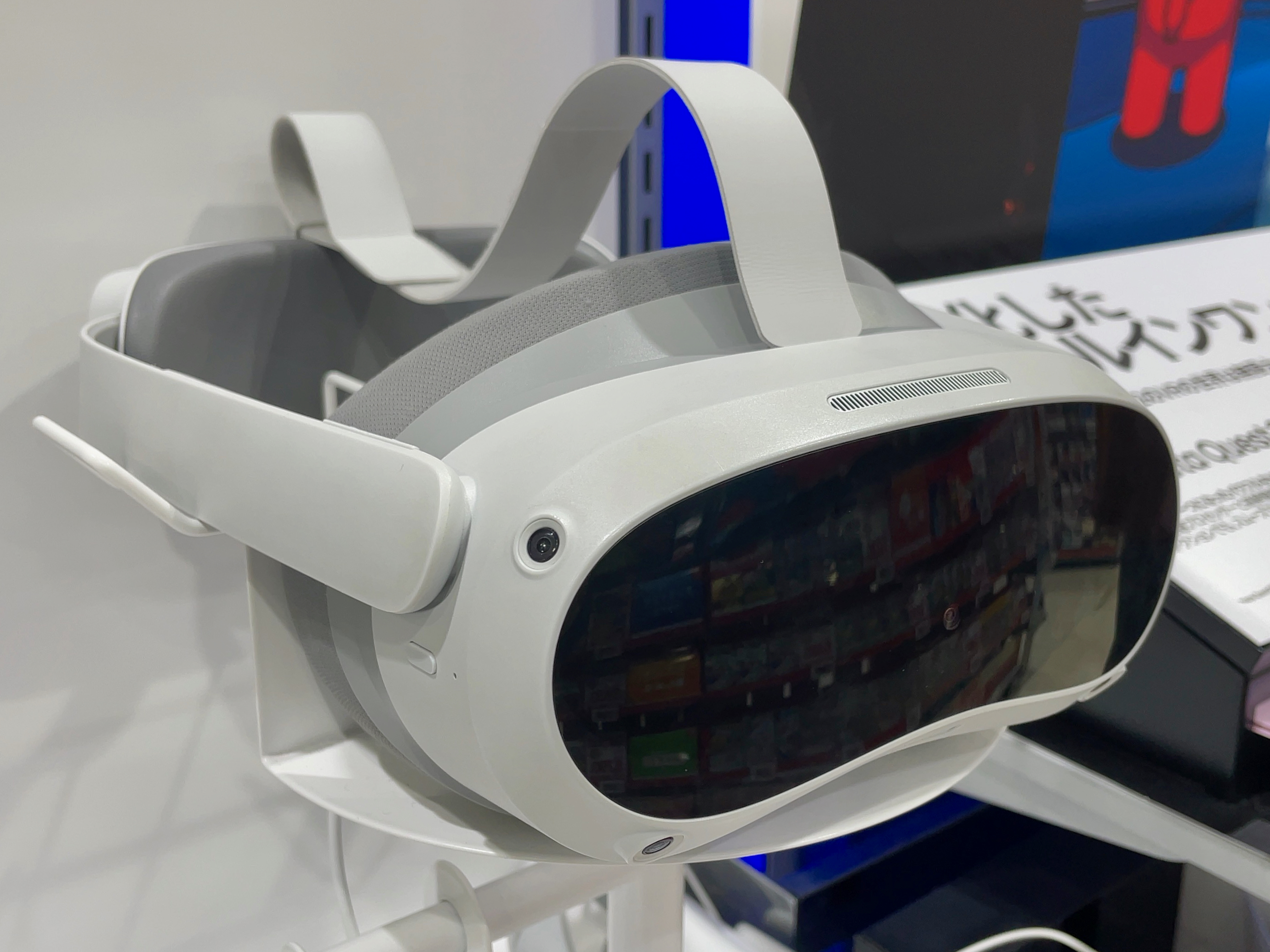
- Pico 4 headset
- Developer: ByteDance
- Type: Virtual reality headset
- Released: October 18, 2022
- Introductory price: €429 (128 GB) €499 (256 GB)
- System on a chip: Qualcomm Snapdragon XR2
- Memory: 8 GB LPDDR4
- Storage: 128 GB; 256 GB
- Display: LCD 2160 x 2160 per eye @ 90 Hz
- Graphics: Adreno 650 @ 587 MHz (Up to 902 GFLOPS FP32)
- Connectivity: USB-C; Bluetooth 5.1; Wi-Fi 6
- Power: Lithium-ion battery 5300 mAh
- Weight: 586 g
- Predecessor: Pico Neo 3
- Successor: Pico 4 Ultra
- Website: Official website

Pico 4 (stylized as PICO 4) is a standalone virtual reality headset developed and manufactured by Pico Immersive, a division of ByteDance. It was unveiled on September 22, 2022, and released on October 18, 2022 as a successor to the Pico Neo 3. It was positioned as a competitor to other standalone VR headsets such as the Meta Quest 2.

It is designed for virtual reality gaming and is available for purchase in Europe and East Asia, but is currently unavailable in the United States.

== History ==
The Pico 4 was officially announced by Pico Interactive on 22 September 2022. It was initially released in China, followed by a broader launch in European markets in October 2022.

The headset was part of ByteDance's expansion into the consumer virtual reality market, competing directly with Meta’s Quest lineup.

== Specifications ==
=== Hardware ===
The Pico 4 uses the Snapdragon XR2, a system on a chip by Qualcomm. It is a derivative of the Snapdragon 865 that is designed for VR and augmented reality devices. It includes 8 GB of LPDDR4 RAM. It includes either 128 GB or 256 GB of internal storage.

The headset uses dual LCD displays with a resolution of 2160 × 2160 pixels per eye, and supports a refresh rate of up to 90 Hz, and provides an approximate field of view of 105 degrees. The refresh rate defaults to 72Hz, but can be switched to 90Hz via experimental settings.

The headset uses pancake lenses, which reduce the distance between the display and lenses, resulting in a thinner visor compared to Fresnel lens designs.

The device employs inside-out tracking using multiple onboard cameras, enabling six degrees of freedom (6DoF) tracking without external sensors. It ships with two motion controllers that include infrared tracking rings. It also features hand tracking.

=== Software ===
The Pico 4 runs an Android-based operating system and uses the Pico Store as its primary digital distribution platform.

It supports a range of VR applications including games, fitness apps, and media playback. The headset is also compatible with PC VR via streaming solutions, allowing it to run titles from platforms such as SteamVR.

== Pico 4 Ultra ==
On September 2, 2024 ByteDance released the Pico 4 Ultra for €549. It has the new Snapdragon XR2 Gen 2 chip (same as in the Meta Quest 3), 12 GB of RAM, 45W charging speed and spatial video capture.

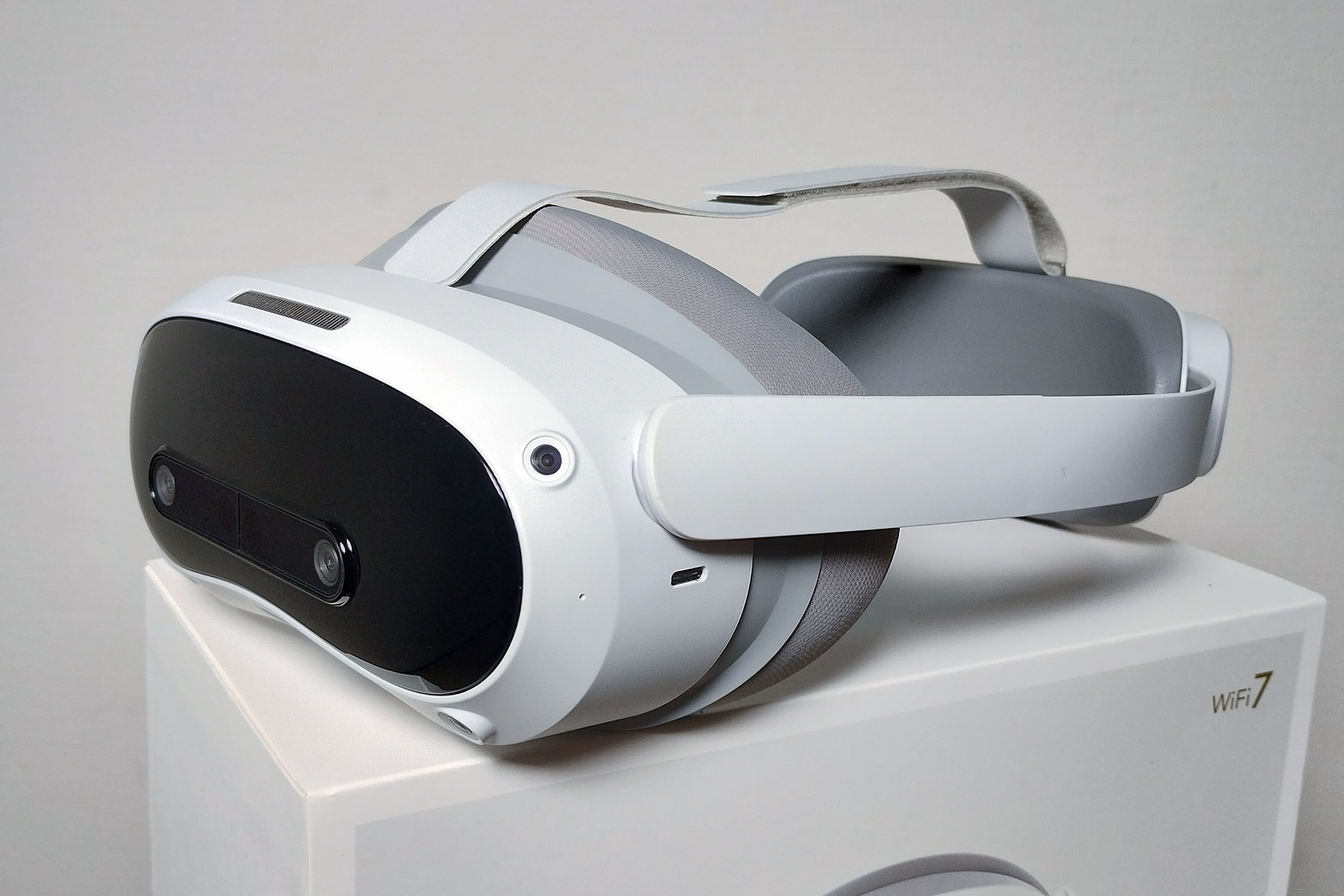
Pico 4 Ultra

== Reception ==
PC Gamer writer Katie Wickens noted that Pico 4 has sharp visual quality, lower price compared to Meta Quest 2 while still retaining similar or higher performance than the Quest 2, accurate tracking, easy IPD and headset adjustment, and good color passthrough. They also pointed out that the headset is slightly front-weighted and also struggled to stream wirelessly. Finally, they mentioned that getting a Pico 4 headset may be difficult for citizens in the U.S.

IGN Southeast Asia writer Syazwan Bahri claims that the Pico 4 headset “blew his socks away,” adding that the headset offers comfort with balanced weight, since the headset has its battery embedded in the strap adjuster of the headband while all the other hardware is stored in the goggle. The writer also mentions that the padded foam helped secure the headset firmly without feeling restrictive. However, the writer stated that Pico 4 lacked content in the store and also mentions the company’s efforts in growing the store. He also mentioned that although battery was not as much of an issue, battery life could have some room for improvement.

== See also ==
- Virtual reality headset
- Meta Quest 2
