= List of cel-shaded video games =

This is a list of video games that use the technique of cel shading, organized alphabetically by name. See lists of video games for related lists.

Game	System(s)	Developers(s)	Publisher	Released
2XKO	Windows, PlayStation 5, Xbox Series X/S	Riot Games		2025
Adventure Time: Pirates of the Enchiridion	Windows, PlayStation 4, Xbox One, Nintendo Switch	Climax Studios	Outright Games	2017
Afro Samurai	Xbox 360, PlayStation 3	Namco Bandai Games	Namco Bandai Games	2008
Akiba's Beat	PlayStation 4, PlayStation Vita	Acquire		2016
Akiba's Trip	PlayStation Portable, Windows, Nintendo Switch, PlayStation 4	Acquire		2011
Akiba's Trip: Undead & Undressed	PlayStation 3, PlayStation Vita, PlayStation 4, Windows, Nintendo Switch	Acquire		2013
American Idol	Windows, PlayStation 2	Hothouse Creations	Codemasters	2003
Antichamber	Windows, OS X, Linux	Demruth	Demruth	2013
Ape Escape: Pumped & Primed	PlayStation 2	Japan Studio	Sony Computer Entertainment	2004
Aqua Teen Hunger Force Zombie Ninja Pro-Am	PlayStation 2	Creat Studios	Midway Games	2007
Astral Chain	Nintendo Switch	PlatinumGames	Nintendo	2019
Atelier Totori: The Adventurer of Arland	PlayStation 3	NIS America		2011
Avatar: The Last Airbender	GameCube, PlayStation 2, Wii, Xbox	THQ Studio Australia	THQ	2006
Auto Modellista	GameCube, PlayStation 2, Xbox	Capcom		2003
Battle Stadium D.O.N	GameCube, PlayStation 2	Eighting	Namco Bandai Games	2006
Battlefield Heroes	Windows	Electronic Arts		2009
Ben 10: Protector of Earth	PlayStation 2, PlayStation Portable, Wii, Nintendo DS	High Voltage Software	D3 Publisher	2007
Bendy and the Ink Machine	Windows, macOS, Linux, PlayStation 4, Xbox One, Nintendo Switch, Android, iOS	Kindly Beast		2017
Black & Bruised	GameCube, PlayStation 2	Majesco		2003
Bleach GC: Tasogare Ni Mamieru Shinigami	GameCube	Sega		2005
Bleach: Blade Battlers	PlayStation 2	Sony Computer Entertainment		2006
Bleach: Blade Battlers 2nd	PlayStation 2	Sony Computer Entertainment		2007
Bleach: Erabareshi Tamashii	PlayStation 2	Sony Computer Entertainment		2005
Bleach: Heat the Soul	PlayStation Portable	Sony Computer Entertainment		2005
Bleach: Heat the Soul 2	PlayStation Portable	Sony Computer Entertainment		2005
Bleach: Heat the Soul 3	PlayStation Portable	Sony Computer Entertainment		2006
Bleach: Heat the Soul 4	PlayStation Portable	Sony Computer Entertainment		2007
Bleach: Shattered Blade	Wii	Sega		2006
Blood+: One Night Kiss	PlayStation 2	Namco Bandai Games, Grasshopper Manufacture	Namco Bandai Games	2006
Bombastic	PlayStation 2	Shift	SCEI	2002
Bomberman Generation	GameCube	Game Arts	Majesco	2002
Bomberman Jetters	GameCube	Hudson Soft	Majesco	2002
Bomberman Online	Dreamcast	h.a.n.d., Hudson Soft	Sega	2001
Bomb Rush Cyberfunk	Microsoft Windows, Nintendo Switch, PlayStation 4, PlayStation 5, Xbox One, Xbox Series X/S	Team Reptile	Team Reptile	2023
Breath of Fire: Dragon Quarter	PlayStation 2	Capcom		2003
Broken Sword: The Serpent's Curse	OS X, Windows, Linux, iOS, Android, PS Vita	Revolution Software		2013
Call of Duty: Black Ops 4	PlayStation Network, Battle.net, Xbox Live	Activision		2018
Call of Juarez: Gunslinger	PlayStation Network, Windows, Xbox Live Arcade	Ubisoft		2013
Cartoon Network Racing	PlayStation 2, Nintendo DS	Eutechnyx	The Game Factory	2006
Catherine	PlayStation 3, Xbox 360	Atlus		2011
Cel Damage	GameCube, Xbox, PlayStation 2, PlayStation 3, PlayStation 4, PlayStation Vita, Xbox One, Nintendo Switch	Pseudo Interactive	Electronic Arts	2001
Chants of Sennaar	Nintendo Switch, PlayStation 4, Windows, Xbox One	Rundisc	Focus Entertainment	2023
Club Penguin	cross-platform	Disney Online Studios Canada		2005
Cowboy Bebop: Tsuioku no Serenade	PlayStation 2	Bandai		2005
Crackdown	Xbox 360	Microsoft Studios		2007
Crackdown 2	Xbox 360	Microsoft Studios		2010
Crackdown 3	Xbox One, Windows	Sumo Digital, Reagent Games, Ruffian Games, Cloudgine	Microsoft Studios	2019
Crayon Shin-chan: Saikyou Kazoku Kasukabe King Wii	Wii	Banpresto (JP); 505 Games (EU)		2006 (JP); 2008 (EU)
Crimson Tears	PlayStation 2	DreamFactory	Capcom	2004
Curious George	PlayStation 2, GameCube, Xbox, Windows	Monkey Bar Games	Namco	2006
Dance Dance Revolution Extreme	PlayStation 2	Konami		2002
Dance Dance Revolution Extreme 2	PlayStation 2	Konami		2005
Dance Dance Revolution Ultramix	Xbox	Konami		2003
Dance Dance Revolution Ultramix 2	Xbox	Konami		2004
Dance Dance Revolution Ultramix 3	Xbox	Konami		2005
Dance Dance Revolution Ultramix 4	Xbox	Konami		2006
Dark Chronicle	PlayStation 2	Level-5	Sony Computer Entertainment	2002
Dawn of Mana	PlayStation 2	Square Enix		2006
Digimon World Data Squad	PlayStation 2	Namco Bandai Games		2006
Donut County	iOS, macOS, Windows, PlayStation 4, Nintendo Switch, Xbox One, Android	Ben Esposito	Annapurna Interactive	2018
Dragon Ball FighterZ	Windows, PlayStation 4, Xbox One, Nintendo Switch, PlayStation 5, Xbox Series X/S	Arc System Works	Bandai Namco Entertainment	2018
Dragon Ball Online	Windows, Xbox	Namco Bandai Games		2008
Dragon Ball Z: Budokai series	PlayStation 2, GameCube, PlayStation Portable	Dimps	Infogrames	2002
Dragon Ball Z: Budokai Tenkaichi series	PlayStation 2, Wii, PlayStation Portable	Spike	Bandai	2005
Dragon Ball Z: Burst Limit	PlayStation 3, Xbox 360	Dimps	Bandai	2008
Dragon Ball Z: Ultimate Tenkaichi	PlayStation 3, Xbox 360	Spike	Namco Bandai Games	2011
Dragon Ball: Raging Blast	PlayStation 3, Xbox 360	Spike	Namco Bandai Games	2009
Dragon Ball: Raging Blast 2	PlayStation 3, Xbox 360	Spike	Namco Bandai Games	2010
Dragon Ball: Revenge of King Piccolo	Wii	Media.Vision	Namco Bandai Games	2009
Dragon Quest IX: Sentinels of the Starry Skies	Nintendo DS	Square Enix		2010
Dragon Quest Monsters: Joker	Nintendo DS	Square Enix		2006
Dragon Quest VIII: Journey of the Cursed King	PlayStation 2	Square Enix		2004
Dragon Quest: Monster Battle Road	Arcade	Square Enix		2007
Dragon's Lair 3D: Return to the Lair	GameCube, Windows, PlayStation 2, Xbox	Ubisoft		2002 (NA); 2004 (EU)
Drake of the 99 Dragons	Xbox, Windows	Majesco		2003
Drift City	Windows, iOS, Android	NPluto		2007
Duel Masters	PlayStation 2	High Voltage Software	Atari	2004
Dynasty Warriors: Gundam 3	PlayStation 3, Xbox 360	Namco Bandai		2010 (JP); 2011 (EU/NA)
Ed, Edd n Eddy: The Mis-Edventures	PlayStation 2, GameCube, Xbox, Windows	Artificial Mind & Movement	Midway Games	2005
Erementar Gerad: Matoe, Suifu no Ken	PlayStation 2	Kadokawa Shoten		2005
El Shaddai: Ascension of the Metatron	PlayStation 3, Xbox 360	Ignition Tokyo	UTV Ignition Games	2011
Elsword	Windows	Nexon		2007
Ennichi no Tatsujin	Wii	Namco Bandai Games		2006
Escape Dead Island	PlayStation 3, Xbox 360, Windows	Deep Silver, Koch Media, Fatshark		2014
Eternal Sonata	Xbox 360, PlayStation 3	Namco Bandai Games		2007
EyeToy: Play 2	PlayStation 2	Sony Computer Entertainment		2005
EyeToy: Play 3	PlayStation 2	Sony Computer Entertainment		2005 (EU); 2007 (NA)
The Fairly OddParents: Breakin' da Rules	GameCube, PlayStation 2, Xbox	Blitz Games	THQ	2003
The Fairly OddParents: Shadow Showdown	GameCube, PlayStation 2	Blitz Games	THQ	2004 (NA); 2005 (EU)
Family Guy Video Game!	PlayStation 2, PlayStation Portable, Xbox	High Voltage Software	2K Games	2006
Family Guy: Back to the Multiverse	PlayStation 3, Xbox 360, Windows	Heavy Iron Studios	Activision	2012
Fat Princess	PlayStation 3, PlayStation Portable	Sony Computer Entertainment		2009
Fire Emblem: Path of Radiance	GameCube	Nintendo		2005
Fire Emblem: Radiant Dawn	Wii	Nintendo		2007 (NA); 2008 (EU)
Fire Emblem: Shadow Dragon	Nintendo DS	Nintendo		2008 (JP/EU); 2009 (NA/AUS)
Fire Emblem Warriors	Nintendo Switch, New Nintendo 3DS	Nintendo		2017
Firefall	Windows	Red 5 Studios		2011 (closed beta)
FreeStyle Street Basketball	Windows	JCEntertainment		2004
FreeStyle 2: Street Basketball	Windows, Steam	JCEntertainment		2014
Frog Detective 2: The Case of the Invisible Wizard	Windows, macOS	Thomas Bowker, Grace Bruxner	Worm Club, SUPERHOT PRESENTS	2019
Fullmetal Alchemist 2: Curse of the Crimson Elixir	PlayStation 2	Square Enix		2004 (JP); 2005 (NA)
Fullmetal Alchemist 3: Kami o Tsugu Shōjo	PlayStation 2	Square Enix		2005
Fullmetal Alchemist: Dream Carnival	PlayStation 2	Bandai		2004
Fur Fighters: Viggo's Revenge	PlayStation 2	Bizarre Creations	Acclaim Entertainment	2001
Furi	Windows, Xbox One, PlayStation 4, PlayStation 5, Nintendo Switch	The Game Bakers		2016
Futurama	PlayStation 2, Xbox	Fox Interactive, Vivendi Games		2003
Ganbare Goemon: Tōkai Dōchū Ōedo Tengu ri Kaeshi no Maki	Nintendo DS	Konami		2005
Genshin Impact	Windows, iOS, Android, PlayStation 4, PlayStation 5, Nintendo Switch	miHoYo	miHoYo	2020
Gintama: General Store Tube: Tsukkomi-able Cartoon	Wii	Namco Bandai		2007
GioGio's Bizarre Adventure	PlayStation 2	Capcom		2002
Go! Go! Hypergrind	GameCube	Atlus		2003
Grabbed by the Ghoulies	Xbox	Rare	Microsoft Studios	2003 (NA/EU); 2004 (JP)
Grand Chase	Windows	Nexon		2003
Grand Theft Auto: Chinatown Wars	Nintendo DS, PlayStation Portable, iOS, Android, Fire OS	Rockstar Games		2009
Gravity Rush	PlayStation Vita, PlayStation 4	Team Gravity	Sony Computer Entertainment	2012
Gravity Rush 2	PlayStation 4	Team Gravity	Sony Computer Entertainment	2017
The Grim Adventures of Billy & Mandy	Wii	Midway Games (NA/EU); Red Ant Enterprises (AU)		2006 (NA); 2007 (EU/AU)
GT Pro Series/GT Cube	Wii, GameCube	Ubisoft (NA/EU/AU); MTO (JP)		2006 (NA/EU/AU)
Guilty Gear Xrd -SIGN-	Arcade, PlayStation 3, PlayStation 4	Sega (Arcade); Arc System Works (JP); Aksys Games (NA)		2014 (Arcade/JP/NA)
Gunbuster	PlayStation 2	Bandai		2005
Gungrave	PlayStation 2	Red Entertainment		2005
Gurumin: A Monstrous Adventure	Windows, PlayStation Portable, Nintendo 3DS	Nihon Falcom		2005
Harvest Moon: Save the Homeland	PlayStation 2	Victor (JP); Natsume Inc. (NA)		2001
The Haunted Island, a Frog Detective Game	Windows, macOS	Thomas Bowker, Grace Bruxner	Worm Club, SUPERHOT PRESENTS	2018
Hi-Fi Rush	Windows, Xbox Series X/S	Tango Gameworks	Bethesda Softworks	2023
Honkai: Star Rail	Windows, iOS, Android PlayStation 5	MiHoYo	MiHoYo	2023
MiSide	Windows	AIHASTO	IndieArk Shochiku	2024
The Idolmaster	Arcade, Xbox 360	Namco Bandai Games		2005
InuYasha: Feudal Combat	PlayStation 2	Bandai		2005
Jackie Chan Adventures	PlayStation 2	Atomic Planet Entertainment	Sony Computer Entertainment	2004
Jeanne d'Arc	PlayStation Portable	Level-5	Sony Computer Entertainment	2007
Jet Set Radio/Jet Grind Radio	Dreamcast, PlayStation 3, Windows, Xbox 360, PlayStation Vita, iOS, Android, Java ME	Smilebit	Sega	2000
Jet Set Radio Future	Xbox	Smilebit	Sega	2002
Journey	PlayStation 3	thatgamecompany	Sony Computer Entertainment	2012
Jumper: Griffin's Story	PlayStation 2, Wii, Xbox 360	Redtribe	Brash Entertainment	2008
Kekkaishi	Nintendo DS	Namco Bandai Games		2005
Karous	Arcade, Dreamcast, Wii	MileStone		2007
killer7	GameCube, PlayStation 2, Windows	Grasshopper Manufacture	Capcom	2005
Killer Is Dead	PlayStation 3, Xbox 360, Windows	Grasshopper Manufacture	Kadokawa Games	2013
Kirby Battle Royale	Nintendo 3DS	Nintendo		2017 (JP/EU); 2018 (NA)
Klonoa 2: Lunatea's Veil	PlayStation 2	Namco (JP/NA); Sony Computer Entertainment Europe (EU)		2001
The Legend of Korra	Microsoft Windows, PlayStation 3, PlayStation 4, Xbox 360, Xbox One	PlatinumGames	Activision	2014
The Legend of Zelda: Breath of the Wild	Wii U, Nintendo Switch	Nintendo EPD	Nintendo	2017
The Legend of Zelda: Tears of the Kingdom	Nintendo Switch	Nintendo EPD	Nintendo	2023
The Legend of Zelda: Phantom Hourglass	Nintendo DS	Nintendo EAD	Nintendo	2007
The Legend of Zelda: The Wind Waker	GameCube, Wii U	Nintendo EAD	Nintendo	2002
The Legend of Zelda: Spirit Tracks	Nintendo DS	Nintendo EAD	Nintendo	2009
Lego Dimensions (only the worlds based on 2D-animated franchises)	PlayStation 4, PlayStation 3, Xbox One, Xbox 360, Wii U	Traveller's Tales	Warner Bros. Interactive Entertainment	2015
Lethal Company	Windows	Zeekerss		2023
Lollipop Chainsaw	PlayStation 3, Xbox 360	Grasshopper Manufacture	Kadokawa Games	2012
Looney Tunes: Space Race	Dreamcast, PlayStation 2	Infogrames Entertainment, SA		2000
Love Live! School Idol Festival: After School Activity	Arcade, PlayStation 4	KLabGames, Square Enix	Square Enix	2016 (Arcade/JP); 2021 (PS4/JP/SEA/NA)
Mabinogi	Windows	Nexon Co. Ltd.		2004 (KO); 2005 (JP); 2008 (NA)
MadWorld	Wii	PlatinumGames	Sega	2009
Mario Strikers: Battle League (Hyper Strikes only)	Nintendo Switch	Next Level Games, Nintendo		2022
Mario & Luigi: Brothership	Nintendo Switch	Acquire	Nintendo	2024
Mega Man Network Transmission	GameCube	Capcom		2003
Mega Man X7	PlayStation 2	Capcom		2003
Mega Man X: Command Mission	GameCube, PlayStation 2	Capcom		2004
Metal Gear Acid 2	PlayStation Portable	Konami		2006
Monster Rancher 3	PlayStation 2	Tecmo		2001
Musashi: Samurai Legend	PlayStation 2	Square Enix		2005
Naruto: Clash of Ninja	GameCube	Takara Tomy (JP); D3 Publisher (NA)		2003 (JP); 2006 (NA)
Naruto: Clash of Ninja 2	GameCube	Takara Tomy (JP); D3 Publisher (NA); Nintendo (EU)		2003 (JP); 2006 (NA/EU)
Naruto: Gekitō Ninja Taisen! 3	GameCube	Takara Tomy		2004
Naruto: Gekitō Ninja Taisen! 4	GameCube	Takara Tomy		2005
Naruto: Rise of a Ninja	Xbox 360	Ubisoft		2007
Naruto: Ultimate Ninja	PlayStation 2	Namco Bandai (JP); Namco Bandai (NA/EU); Atari (AU)		2005 (JP); 2008 (NA/EU/AU)
Naruto: Ultimate Ninja 2	PlayStation 2	Namco Bandai (JP); Namco Bandai (NA/EU); Atari (AU)		2004 (JP); 2007 (NA/EU/AU)
Naruto: Ultimate Ninja 3	PlayStation 2	Namco Bandai (JP); Namco Bandai (NA/EU); Atari (AU)		2005 (JP); 2008 (NA/EU/AU)
Naruto: Ultimate Ninja Storm	PlayStation 3	Namco Bandai		2008 (NA/EU/AU); 2009 (JP)
Need for Speed Unbound	PlayStation 5, Xbox Series X/S, Microsoft Windows	Criterion Games	Electronic Arts	2022
NEO: The World Ends with You	PlayStation 4, Nintendo Switch, Microsoft Windows	h.a.n.d.	Square Enix	2021
Mahō Sensei Negima!? Neo-Pactio Fight!!	Wii	Marvelous Entertainment		2007
Ni no Kuni: Dominion of the Dark Djinn	Nintendo DS	Level-5		2013 (NA/EU); 2010 (JP)
Ni no Kuni: Wrath of the White Witch	PlayStation 3, Nintendo Switch, PlayStation 4, Microsoft Windows, Xbox One, Xbox Series X/S	Level-5		2013 (NA/EU); 2011 (JP)
Ni no Kuni II: Revenant Kingdom	Nintendo Switch, PlayStation 4, Microsoft Windows, Xbox One, Xbox Series X/S	Level-5		2018
Nicktoons Unite! (Nintendo DS version only)	Nintendo DS	Climax Action	THQ	2006
No More Heroes	Wii	Grasshopper Manufacture	Marvelous Entertainment	2007
No More Heroes 2: Desperate Struggle	Wii	Grasshopper Manufacture	Marvelous Entertainment	2010
No More Heroes: Heroes' Paradise	PlayStation 3, Xbox 360	feelplus	Marvelous Entertainment	2010
Ōkami	PlayStation 2, Wii, PlayStation 3, Microsoft Windows, PlayStation 4, Xbox One, Nintendo Switch	Clover Studio	Capcom	2006
Ōkamiden	Nintendo DS	Mobile & Game Studio, Inc.	Capcom	2010
Ollie King	Arcade	Amusement Vision	Sega	2004
One Piece: Grand Adventure	GameCube, PlayStation 2	Namco Bandai (JP); Namco Bandai (NA/KO); Atari (EU)		2006
One Piece: Grand Battle!	GameCube, PlayStation 2	Namco Bandai Games (JP/NA); Atari (EU)		2005
One Piece: Pirates' Carnival	GameCube, PlayStation 2	Namco Bandai Games		2005 (JP); 2006 (NA)
One Piece: Unlimited Adventure	Wii	Namco Bandai Games		2007 (JP); 2008 (NA)
Open Roads	Windows, Nintendo Switch, Xbox One, PlayStation 4, Xbox Series X/S, PlayStation 5	Open Roads Team	Annapurna Interactive	2024
Penny Arcade Adventures: On the Rain-Slick Precipice of Darkness	Windows, OS X, Linux, Xbox 360, PlayStation 3	Hothead Games		2008
Persona 5	PlayStation 3, PlayStation 4	Atlus		2016 (JP); 2017 (NA)
Persona 5 Tactica	Nintendo Switch PlayStation 4, Xbox One, Xbox Series X/S, PlayStation 5, Microsoft Windows	P-Studio	Sega	2023
Pokémon Battrio	Arcade	AQ Interactive	Takara Tomy	2007
Pokémon Omega Ruby and Alpha Sapphire	Nintendo 3DS	Game Freak	Nintendo	2014
Pokémon Sun and Moon	Nintendo 3DS	Game Freak	Nintendo	2016
Pokémon Ultra Sun and Ultra Moon	Nintendo 3DS	Game Freak	Nintendo	2017
Pokémon X and Y	Nintendo 3DS	Game Freak	Nintendo	2013
PK: Out of the Shadows	PlayStation 2, GameCube	Ubisoft Montreal	Ubi Soft	2002
Prince of Persia	Xbox 360, PlayStation 3, Windows, OS X	Ubisoft		2008
Punch-Out!!	Wii	Next Level Games	Nintendo	2009
Radiata Stories	PlayStation 2	Square Enix		2005
Radirgy	Arcade, Dreamcast, GameCube, PlayStation 2	MileStone		2006
Radirgy Noa	Arcade, Wii, Xbox 360, Windows	MileStone		2009
Rec Room	Windows, PlayStation 4	Against Gravity		2016
Red Steel 2	Wii	Ubisoft		2010
Robotech: Battlecry	GameCube, PlayStation 2, Xbox	TDK Mediactive		2002
Rogue Galaxy	PlayStation 2	Level-5	Sony Computer Entertainment	2005 (JP); 2007 (NA/EU/AU)
Romance of the Three Kingdoms XI	Windows, PlayStation 2	Koei		2006–2007
Runaway: A Road Adventure	Windows, Nintendo DS, Wii	Péndulo Studios, S.L.		2001
Runaway 2: The Dream of the Turtle	Windows, Nintendo DS, Wii	Péndulo Studios, S.L.		2006
Runaway: A Twist of Fate	Windows, Nintendo DS, Wii	Péndulo Studios, S.L.		2009
Sable	Windows, Xbox One, Xbox Series X/S	Shedworks	Raw Fury	2021
Saiyuki Reload Gunlock	PlayStation 2	Bandai		2004
Scooby-Doo! Unmasked	GameCube, PlayStation 2, Xbox	Artificial Mind & Movement	THQ	2005
SD Gundam Force: Showdown!	PlayStation 2	Namco Bandai Games		2004
SD Gundam Gashapon Wars	GameCube	Namco Bandai Games		2005
Sea of Thieves	Xbox One, Microsoft Windows	Rare	Microsoft Studios	2018
The Secret Saturdays: Beasts of the 5th Sun	Wii, PlayStation 2	High Voltage Software	D3 Publisher	2009
Seven: The Days Long Gone	Windows, PlayStation 4	IMGN.PRO, Fool's Theory		2017
Shaman King: Funbari Spirits	PlayStation 2	Namco Bandai Games		2004
Sheep, Dog 'n' Wolf	Windows, PlayStation	Infogrames Entertainment, SA		2001
A Short Hike	Windows, macOS, Linux, Nintendo Switch	Adam Robinson-Yu	Adam Robinson-Yu	2019
Shijō Saikyō no Deshi Kenichi: Gekitō! Ragnarok Hachikengō	PlayStation 2	Capcom		2007
Shin Megami Tensei: Digital Devil Saga	PlayStation 2	Atlus (JP/NA); Ghostlight (EU)		2004 (JP); 2005 (NA); 2006 (EU)
Shin Megami Tensei: Digital Devil Saga 2	PlayStation 2	Atlus (JP/NA); Ghostlight (EU/AU)		2005 (JP/NA); 2007 (EU/AU)
Shin Megami Tensei: Nocturne	PlayStation 2	Atlus		2003 (JP); 2004 (NA); 2005 (EU)
The Simpsons Game	Xbox 360, PlayStation 3, Wii, PlayStation 2, PlayStation Portable, Nintendo DS	EA Redwood Shores	Electronic Arts	2007
Sly 2: Band of Thieves	PlayStation 2	Sucker Punch Productions	Sony Computer Entertainment	2004 (NA); 2005 (EU); 2006 (JP)
Sly 3: Honor Among Thieves	PlayStation 2	Sucker Punch Productions	Sony Computer Entertainment	2005
Sly Cooper and the Thievius Raccoonus	PlayStation 2	Sucker Punch Productions	Sony Computer Entertainment	2002 (NA); 2003 (JP/EU)
Sly Cooper: Thieves in Time	PlayStation 3, PlayStation Vita	Sanzaru Games	Sony Computer Entertainment	2013
Sonic Shuffle	Dreamcast	Sega	Sega	2000
Spider-Man: Shattered Dimensions	PlayStation 3, Xbox 360, Wii, Windows	Beenox	Activision	2010
SpongeBob SquarePants: Creature from the Krusty Krab	GameCube, PlayStation 2, Wii	Blitz Games	THQ	2006
Steambot Chronicles	PlayStation 2	Irem (JP); Atlus (NA); 505 Games (EU/AU)		2005 (JP); 2006 (NA/EU/AU)
Steamboy	PlayStation 2	Namco Bandai Games		2005 (JP); 2006 (NA)
Strong Bad's Cool Game for Attractive People	Wii, Windows	Telltale Games		2008
Suikoden Tactics	PlayStation 2	Konami		2005 (JP/NA); 2006 (EU)
Super Dragon Ball Z	Arcade, PlayStation 2	Bandai		2005
Super Dragon Ball Z	Arcade, PlayStation 2	Banpresto (Arcade), Namco Bandai Games (PlayStation 2)		2006
Super Mega Baseball	PlayStation 3, PlayStation 4, Xbox One	Metalhead Software		2015
Super Paper Mario	Wii	Nintendo		2007
Superman: Shadow of Apokolips	GameCube, PlayStation 2	Atari		2003
Tales of Symphonia	GameCube	Namco		2004
Tales of the Tempest	Nintendo DS	Namco Bandai Games		2006
Tales of Vesperia	Xbox 360, PlayStation 3	Namco Bandai Games		2008
Tatsunoko vs. Capcom	Arcade, Wii	Capcom		2008
Taz: Wanted	Windows, PlayStation 2, GameCube, Xbox	Blitz Games	Infogrames	2002
Teenage Mutant Ninja Turtles	Windows, GameCube, PlayStation 2, Xbox	Konami		2003
Teenage Mutant Ninja Turtles 2: Battle Nexus	Windows, GameCube, PlayStation 2, Xbox	Konami		2004 (NA); 2005 (EU/AU)
Teenage Mutant Ninja Turtles 3: Mutant Nightmare	GameCube, PlayStation 2, Xbox	Konami		2005 (NA); 2006 (EU)
Teenage Mutant Ninja Turtles: Mutants in Manhattan	Windows, PlayStation 3, PlayStation 4, Xbox 360, Xbox One	PlatinumGames	Activision	2016
Teenage Mutant Ninja Turtles: Mutant Melee	Windows, GameCube, PlayStation 2, Xbox	Konami		2005
Tokimeki Memorial 3	PlayStation 2	Konami		2001
Tomodachi Life: Living the Dream	Nintendo Switch	Nintendo	Nintendo	2026
Tony Hawk's American Sk8land	Nintendo DS, Game Boy Advance	Activision		2005
Tony Hawk's Downhill Jam	Nintendo DS	Activision		2006
Trails in the Sky 1st Chapter	Nintendo Switch, Nintendo Switch 2, PlayStation 5, Windows	Nihon Falcom	GungHo	2025
Transformers: Devastation	Windows, PlayStation 3, PlayStation 4, Xbox 360, Xbox One	PlatinumGames	Activision	2015
Travis Strikes Again: No More Heroes	Nintendo Switch, Windows, PlayStation 4	Grasshopper Manufacture	Grasshopper Manufacture	2019
Ueki no Hōsoku: Taosu ze Roberuto Jūdan!!	PlayStation 2	Bandai		2006
Ultimate Spider-Man	GameCube, PlayStation 2, Xbox, Nintendo DS, Windows	Treyarch	Activision	2005
Under the Skin	PlayStation 2	Capcom	Capcom	2004
Untitled Goose Game	macOS, Windows, Nintendo Switch, PlayStation 4, Xbox One	House House	Panic	2019
Up (Wii version only)	Wii	Heavy Iron Studios	THQ	2009
Valkyria Chronicles	PlayStation 3, Windows	Sega		2008
Victorious Boxers: Revolution	Wii	AQ Interactive (JP/AU); Xseed Games (NA); Ubisoft (EU)		2007 (JP/NA); 2008 (EU/AU)
Viewtiful Joe	GameCube, PlayStation 2	Capcom	Capcom	2003
Viewtiful Joe 2	GameCube, PlayStation 2	Clover Studio	Capcom	2004
Viewtiful Joe: Double Trouble!	Nintendo DS	Clover Studio	Capcom	2005
Viewtiful Joe: Red Hot Rumble	GameCube, PlayStation Portable	Clover Studio	Capcom	2005
vSide	Windows, OS X	ExitReality		2006
Wacky Races: Starring Dastardly and Muttley	PlayStation 2, Dreamcast	Infogrames Sheffield House	Infogrames	2000
Warsow	Windows, Linux, OS X	Warsow team		2005
White Night	Linux, Windows, PlayStation 4, OS X, Xbox One, Android, IOS, Nintendo Switch	OSome Studio	Activision	2015
Wild Arms 3	PlayStation 2, PlayStation 4	Media.Vision	Sony Interactive Entertainment	2002 (JP/NA); 2003 (EU); 2016 (WW)
Woody Woodpecker: Escape from Buzz Buzzard Park	Windows, PlayStation 2	Eko Software	DreamCatcher Interactive	2001
Wrack	Windows	Final Boss Entertainment		2013
X-Men Legends	PlayStation 2, GameCube, Xbox, N-Gage	Raven Software	Activision	2004
X-Men Legends II: Rise of Apocalypse	PlayStation 2, GameCube, Xbox, PlayStation Portable, Windows, N-Gage	Raven Software	Activision	2005
Xiaolin Showdown	PlayStation 2, PlayStation Portable, Xbox, Nintendo DS	BottleRocket Entertainment, Razorback Developments	Konami, Warner Bros. Interactive Entertainment	2006
XIII	GameCube, Windows, PlayStation 2, Xbox, OS X	Southend Interactive, Ubisoft Paris	Ubisoft	2003
Yogurting	Windows	Neowiz		2005
Yanya Caballista: City Skater	PlayStation 2	Cave	Koei	2001
Yo-kai Watch 4	Nintendo Switch, PlayStation 4	Level 5		2019
Yu Yu Hakusho: Dark Tournament	PlayStation 2	Atari		2004 (NA); 2005 (EU)
Yū Yū Hakusho Forever	PlayStation 2	Banpresto		2005
Zack & Wiki: Quest for Barbaros' Treasure	Wii	Capcom		2007
Zatch Bell! Mamodo Battles	GameCube, PlayStation 2	Namco Bandai		2005
Zatch Bell! Mamodo Fury	GameCube, PlayStation 2	Namco Bandai		2004 (JP); 2006 (NA)
Zenless Zone Zero	Windows iOS Android PlayStation 5	MiHoYo	MiHoYo	2024
Zineth	Windows, MacOS	Arcane Kids		2012

== See also ==
Note: These franchise(s) below have significant numbers of titles with cel-shaded graphics.

- Atelier (Multi-decade JRPG & crafting hybrid series, started in 1997)
- Dragon Quest (Multi-decade franchise with JRPGs & other genres, started in 1986. Cel-shaded graphics approximately first seen in Dragon Quest VIII: Journey of the Cursed King (2004).)
- Hyperdimension Neptunia ( with JRPGs & other genres, started in 2010)
- Katamari Damacy (Multi-decade action puzzle franchise, started in 2004)
