= Frog Detective 2: The Case of the Invisible Wizard =

2019 comedy video game

- Developers: Grace Bruxner; Thomas Bowker
- Designer: Grace Bruxner
- Composer: Dan Golding
- Series: Frog Detective
- Engine: Unity
- Platforms: Windows, macOS
- Release: December 9, 2019
- Genres: Adventure, Comedy
- Mode: Single-player

Frog Detective 2: The Case of the Invisible Wizard is a 2019 comedy adventure video game by independent Australian developers Grace Bruxner and Thomas Bowker. Gameplay revolves around the player's role as Frog Detective, a detective frog who is tasked with solving a mystery.

The game was met with a positive reception.

Second in the Frog Detective series, it is the sequel to The Haunted Island, a Frog Detective Game from 2018, and a final instalment, Frog Detective 3: Corruption at Cowboy County, was released in 2022. The trilogy was re-released together as The Entire Mystery in 2023.

== Plot ==
Frog Detective 2: The Case of the Invisible Wizard begins with Frog Detective receiving a call from the Supervisor. He informs Frog Detective that a new resident has moved into the town of Warlock Woods. The residents of the town decided to greet the newcomer with a welcoming parade. However, someone destroyed the parade decorations and no one knows who did it. Right before the Detective leaves, the Supervisor informs him that the new resident is actually an invisible wizard; which means no one knows what she looks like, and people are excited to find out, and the reason they were planning a parade was because they were hoping to coerce her into becoming visible.

Mary tries to extort Frog Detective, in exchange for the phone number of someone she claims to have seen who committed the crime. After doing various tasks, Frog Detective earns the money and gives it to Mary. She reveals it is the phone number of the postman, who may have seen the crime. Frog Detective calls the number and learns that the parcel the mailman was delivering at the time was for someone named Lola, who does not seem to live in the town. He saw someone drop something at the entrance to the town. Once Frog Detective goes to the entrance of the town, they find a pair of glasses, with the name "The Invisible Wizard" engraved on them.

Frog Detective decides to return the glasses to the Wizard. Frog Detective returns the glasses to the Wizard, who reveals that they are Lola. The Wizard reveals that they were the one who destroyed the parade because they didn't have their glasses, causing them to stumble around, not being able to see anything. The Detective then has the choice to lie, and say "Evil guy" did it, or the truth that Lola did. Either way, the townsfolk have a party. Frog Detective then gets a call from the Supervisor, who thanks him on finishing the case. If Frog Detective had lied, he tells the Supervisor that "Evil guy" is not real, and the Wizard was the true culprit. Either way, the Supervisor reveals that he has a new crime, that he wants Frog Detective to solve with Lobster Cop, and then tells Frog Detective to head to the train station. After Frog Detective leaves, a mysterious figure steals his notebook. Frog Detective gets on the train, which leads to Cowboy County.

== Gameplay ==
The Case of the Invisible Wizard is the sequel to The Haunted Island. The gameplay of The Case of the Invisible Wizard is mostly the same as in The Haunted Island. Players tend to spend most of their time conversing with other characters, but this game adds a new feature: the notebook, which allows players to keep track of their progress. Players receive a magnifying glass, which has no use besides making things slightly bigger.

== Development ==
The Case of the Invisible Wizard was partially funded by the creators of Superhot. Developer Grace Bruxner said that Superhot noticed her "cool frog game and were like 'hmmm... what if..... money?????'" and she "was like '...ok fine'". Their other source of income was Film Victoria, a Melbourne-based government organisation, which offered a release grant for up to AU$30.000 for games close to release.

== Reception ==
Reception

Aggregate score
| Aggregator | Score |
|---|---|
| Metacritic | 81/100 |

Review score
| Publication | Score |
|---|---|
| Destructoid | 8.5/10 |

According to review aggregator Metacritic, the game received "generally favorable reviews". Destructoid's Kevin Mersereau said the game is "so dang wholesome and smile-inducing."

The game's writing and humor was praised by reviewers. GameSpot's David Wildgoose said that the writing is "sharp", and "goofy without slipping into wackiness, and facetious without sliding into sarcasm." Mersereau said that compared to The Haunted Island, the jokes in The Case of the Invisible Wizard are a lot funnier.
