= Frog Detective 3: Corruption at Cowboy County =

2022 comedy video game

- Developers: Grace Bruxner; Thomas Bowker
- Designer: Grace Bruxner
- Composer: Dan Golding
- Series: Frog Detective
- Engine: Unity
- Platforms: Windows, macOS
- Release: October 26, 2022
- Genre: Adventure
- Mode: Single-player

Frog Detective 3: Corruption at Cowboy County is a 2022 adventure game by independent Australian developers Grace Bruxner and Thomas Bowker. Gameplay revolves around the player's role as Frog Detective, a detective frog who is trying to solve a comedic mystery. It was met with a positive reception.

Third in the Frog Detective series, it is the sequel to The Haunted Island, a Frog Detective Game from 2018 and Frog Detective 2: The Case of the Invisible Wizard from 2019. The trilogy was re-released together as The Entire Mystery in 2023.

== Gameplay ==
Players chat with the residents of a Western town to solve a mystery. By solving the residents' issues, which generally involves doing fetch quests, players learn more about potential suspects. It is played from a first-person perspective.

== Plot ==
After the events of the last game, Frog Detective arrives at Cowboy County, where he calls his Supervisor, learning that the hats owned by the town's citizens have been stolen and that Frog Detective must work with Lobster Cop and the quiet sheriff Mason Mole. Frog Detective learns that Lobster Cop has uncovered a possible point of interest in the town's graveyard but must find several things first.

While searching the town, he meets the townsfolk including Susy Rabbit, a girl who left something in a bank, Pistol, an artist searching for his next muse, and a trio of kind outlaws led by a sloth named Sherman who falls for Frog Detective and as does he. Eventually Frog Detective is able to find everything needed and finds the hats were buried behind the crypt. Before he can give the hats back, Mason Mole and Lobster Cop show evidence of Frog Detective burying the hats, making it look like he stole them, and they then make it seem he did it because normal hats cannot fit his oddly-shaped head. Everyone believes he did it, and he is sentenced to one year in the a jail cell called the "bad room".

Frog Detective is allowed to have a computer and uses it to write to his blog, claiming that he has been framed in order to prove his innocence. One of his blog readers, Mystery Monkey (the leader of the ghost hunters from the first game) learns this and decides to prove his innocence. He talks to superior about Frog Detective's jailing and the superior mentions Mason Mole. Mystery Monkey recalls a mole appearing on the island during the first game and the superior reveals that a mole was spotted in the town from the second game. Mystery Monkey investigates Frog Detective's office and uses powder finding several footprints leading to Lobster Cop's desk and finds several letters and photos revealing that Lobster Cop and Mason Mole were friends and the two had planned to set up Frog Detective for a crime and that Lobster Cop hadn't solved any cases recently.

Monkey and Superior arrive in Cowboy County and prove Frog Detective's innocence. Lobster Cop explains that he felt threatened by Frog Detective's detective skills that his own career began to falter thereby, so he pretended to solve cases hoping the superior wouldn't notice. He and Mason Mole apologizes for everything. They accept their apologies and the superior fires them both but suggests the two become post men. Superior then hires Monkey as the "number 1 detective", making Frog Detective his sidekick, much to the eponymous Frog Detective's excitement; a party commences to celebrate.

Two weeks later, on Frog Detective's birthday. Mystery Monkey says that a new case has commenced. Lobster Cop (who is now going by "Lobster Postie") gives him a package revealing a small hat specially designed to fit his head.

== Reception ==
Frog Detective 3 received positive reviews on Metacritic. PC Gamer, Rock Paper Shotgun, and Adventure Gamers praised its humor. PC Gamer said the fetch quests never devolve into busywork. Rock Paper Shotgun described it as "earnest, good-natured fun" and recommended it to fans of the first two games. Adventure Gamers criticized the lack of voice acting and felt Frog Detective 3 could be repetitive, but they recommended it to casual gamers.
