= Tank Beat =

2006 video game

- North American cover art
- Developer: Milestone Inc.
- Publishers: JP: Milestone Inc.; NA: O3 Entertainment; PAL: Midas Interactive
- Platform: Nintendo DS
- Release: JP: November 30, 2006; NA: May 24, 2007; EU: October 5, 2007; AU: October 25, 2007
- Genre: Artillery/Strategy
- Modes: Single-player, multiplayer

Tank Beat (タンクビート, Tanku Bīto), known in PAL regions as Tank Battles, is an artillery/strategy game for the Nintendo DS that was developed by Milestone Inc.

== Overview ==
In Tank Beat players take control of Vill Katjue, a rookie tank driver lost in the chaos of an invasion. The game features 24 missions as well as skirmish modes.

The game is played with the stylus, with players drawing paths on the touch screen for their tank to follow, dragging the stylus across the screen to rotate the camera, and tapping on enemy units to fire upon them. More than 20 different tanks and combat vehicles such as APCs or missile launchers are available to the player, each differing in speed, defense, firepower, and weapons. Players can also give commands to allied AI-controlled tanks.

The game also supports two to four-player wireless play, and online games through the Nintendo Wi-Fi Connection.

== Reception ==
Reception

Aggregate score
Aggregator	Score
Metacritic	40/100

Review scores
Publication	Score
Eurogamer	4/10
Famitsu	28/40
GameRevolution	D−
GameSpot	3.7/10
GameZone	3.1/10
IGN	4/10
Nintendo World Report	7/10
Wired	5/10

Tank Beat received "unfavorable" reviews according to the review aggregation website Metacritic. The gameplay mechanics were cited to have a "hit or miss" feel, ranging from "great fun" to "old in about two seconds". In Japan, however, Famitsu gave it a score of all four sevens for a total of 28 out of 40.

== Sequel ==
A sequel titled Tank Beat 2 Gekitotsu! Deutsch-gun vs. Rengō-gun (タンクビート2 激突! ドイツ軍vs.連合軍, Tanku Bīto 2 Gekitotsu! Doichi-gun vs. Rengō-gun) was released in Japan on November 29, 2007. It was released in North America on December 2, 2008, renamed as Heavy Armor Brigade and published by UFO Interactive Games.
