= Frog Detective =

Frog Detective is a series of video games made by Australian video game developer Grace Bruxner including:

- The Haunted Island, a Frog Detective Game
- Frog Detective 2: The Case of the Invisible Wizard
- Frog Detective 3: Corruption at Cowboy County
