= Grace Bruxner =

Australian video game developer

- Occupation: Video game developer
- Known for: Frog Detective
- Website: gracebruxner.com

Grace Bruxner is an Australian video game developer. She is primarily known for creating the Frog Detective series of games. Her games have a focus on humour.

== Career ==
Bruxner is Australian. She is the Creative Director of Worm Club. She focuses on creating diorama-like games. She created a game called The Fish Market, about a marketplace run by fish. Another one of her games is called Alien Caseno, about a casino where confused space aliens play games such as "ponker" and "peetser", and incompetently attempt to mimic the betting strategies of the "humens of Erth". Snail Wisdom Simulator, created by Bruxner, tasks the player with asking a snail various questions, and has the gastropod respond using emojis.

Her Frog Detective games are known for their humor and simple art styles.

Her games have been compared to walking simulators, but she rejects the comparison. She created The Haunted Island, a Frog Detective Game, Frog Detective 2: The Case of the Invisible Wizard, and Frog Detective 3: Corruption at Cowboy County. She began work on the Frog Detective series during her final year at university. Some of the inspiration for her Frog Detective games comes from Agatha Christie, who is known for creating Poirot. She secured funding from the creators of Superhot for her second Frog Detective game, The Case of the Invisible Wizard. In 2025, she was taking an indefinite hiatus from creating video games.

For many of her games, she creates innocent worlds, which are embodied by characters such as Frog Detective, who at one point assures a suspect that "gaol isn't real", and confides in his boss that, indeed, he does not even believe in the existence of crime. Her Frog Detective franchise is intentionally lighthearted, and avoids dark topics such as murder, despite being a game about detectives. Some of her games use deadpan humour. By choice, she does not use complex systems or complex mechanics for her games. Many of her characters have character flaws and various neuroses, such as suffering from anxiety or being prone to nervousness. For instance, her character Martin the Sloth, and his anxious, unreasonable and neurotic behaviour, was inspired by how Bruxner perceives parts of her own personality, which she perceives as creating a conflict with her logical thought processes.
