= Karous =

2006 video game

- Developer: MileStone Inc.
- Publishers: Sega (arcade); MileStone Inc. (DC)
- Platforms: Arcade; Dreamcast; Nintendo Wii; Microsoft Windows; PlayStation 4 PlayStation 5 Nintendo Switch
- Release: Arcade: JP: November 15, 2006; Dreamcast: JP: March 8, 2007
- Genre: Vertical-scrolling shooter
- Mode: Single-player
- Arcade system: Sega NAOMI

Karous (カラス, karasu, "crows") is a vertical-scrolling shooter video game developed by MileStone Inc. for the Sega NAOMI platform and released in Japanese arcades on November 15, 2006. The game was later ported to the Sega Dreamcast, becoming the system's last officially licensed title when it was released in Japan on March 8, 2007.

== Gameplay ==
The weapon system is based on Radio Allergy, but it uses a unique D.F.S. bomb system.

Bombs can be used when SP gauge is full. When a bomb is activated, a barrier surrounds the player, which can damage enemies within the barrier. For the duration of bomb activation, the player is invulnerable. Enemies destroyed by the barrier provide more experience points to the player.

The player's shot, sword, shield can be upgraded by using experience items dropped from enemies, with a maximum of 100 levels. Weapon levels also act as score multipliers.

=== Characters ===
- Karous (カラス) – Player's ship pilot
- Shigi (シギ) – Navigator
- Akahara (アカハラ(赤原))
- Hakugan (ハクガン(剥眼))

== Release ==
On April 8, 2008, a Nintendo Wii version of the game was released in Japan, titled MileStone Shooting Collection: Karous Wii. The collection includes both Radirgy and Chaos Field as extras. This collection was released in the United States in February 2009 by UFO Interactive Games under the name Ultimate Shooting Collection.

Ports of the game to PlayStation 4, PlayStation 5, and Nintendo Switch were released on November 27, 2025, exclusively in Japan. This version was later released worldwide for Microsoft Windows on Steam on January 22, 2026.

== Reception ==
Famitsu gave the Dreamcast version a review of 6, 6, 6, 7, while Edge gave it 6 out of 10. The game marks the last official third-party release for the Dreamcast platform.
