= The Haunted Island, a Frog Detective Game =

2018 comedy video game

- Developers: Grace Bruxner; Thomas Bowker
- Designer: Grace Bruxner
- Composer: Dan Golding
- Series: Frog Detective
- Engine: Unity
- Platforms: Windows, macOS, Xbox, Nintendo Switch, PlayStation 5, PlayStation 4
- Release: November 22, 2018
- Genres: Adventure, Comedy
- Mode: Single-player

The Haunted Island, a Frog Detective Game is a 2018 comedy adventure video game created by independent Australian developers Grace Bruxner and Thomas Bowker. Gameplay revolves around the player's role as Frog Detective, a detective frog who is trying to solve a mystery. It received mixed reviews.

First in the Frog Detective series, a sequel entitled Frog Detective 2: The Case of the Invisible Wizard was released in 2019, and a final instalment, Frog Detective 3: Corruption at Cowboy County, was released in 2022. The trilogy was re-released together as The Entire Mystery in 2023.

== Plot ==
The Haunted Island begins with Frog Detective getting a call from his supervisor, who informs him that a ghost has been heard on the island. Frog Detective grabs his magnifying glass and goes to the island, where he meets several people, including Martin, the owner of the island who first heard the ghost, and Larry, who insists he is not the ghost. Larry then informs Frog Detective that the ghost noises are coming from the cave nearby.

Martin also tells Frog Detective that he is planning a dance party the next day with his friend Finley, who lives off the island. However, an explosive device is needed to enter the cave. Frog Detective begins collecting the items needed to create an explosive device from the residents of the island. After collecting all the needed materials, Frog Detective is able to enter the cave. Inside, Frog Detective finds Finley, practicing dancing.

It turns out that the ghostly noises were coming from Finley's radio. Finley and Frog Detective leave the cave and talk to Martin, and they all agree that books should never be trusted. Finley, Frog Detective and Martin then decide to move the contest from the next day to the current day. All the residents of the island then dance and the player is able to choose the winner.

== Gameplay ==
Some of the characters found in The Haunted Island

The Haunted Island's gameplay revolves around collecting the ingredients needed for an explosive device, to see if a ghost is inside a cave. Frog Detective is able to converse with several characters, such as the scientists Fresh X and MysteryMonkey.

== Development ==
The Haunted Island took around five months to develop. Grace Bruxner aimed to subvert the detective genre as she created the game, which she had felt had become largely dominated by media such as Agatha Christie's Poirot and L.A. Noire. She also did research into the cinematography and camera angles of the detective genre to use in The Haunted Island, as she felt that the camera angles used in those pieces of media are extremely serious as compared to The Haunted Island, and using them would create comedy due to the mismatch in tone. Additionally, she aimed to avoid writing characters that relied on offensive stereotypes.

Bruxner claims that she made around 7,000 dollars from the game on its first month on the market. After the game was released, Superhot, the company that created the eponymous Superhot, a first-person shooter video game, gave funding to developer Grace Bruxner for use in developing this game's sequel, Frog Detective 2: The Case of the Invisible Wizard. Superhot said that the funding constituted the "crossover no one asked for".

== Reception ==
Reception

Aggregate score
Aggregator	Score
Metacritic	73/100

Review scores
Publication	Score
Destructoid	8/10
Edge	7/10

The game received "mixed or average" reviews according to Metacritic. Destructoid's Kevin Mersereau called it "pretty gosh darn rad."

The game's humor was praised by critics. Kotaku's Cameron Kunzelman called it "really, really funny", comparing it to a Wes Anderson film. Vice's Danielle Riendeau favorably compared it to Donut County, which they said is "another game that is really funny without trying too hard."

Mersereau praised the game’s graphics, saying that it is "suitably goofy", and "gels wonderfully with the whole aesthetic."

The Haunted Island was nominated for best student game at the Independent Games Festival.
