= MileStone Inc. =

Japanese video game developer company

- Native name: 株式会社マイルストーン
- Industry: Video games
- Founded: April 22, 2003
- Defunct: March 21, 2013
- Fate: Closed
- Headquarters: Suginami, Tokyo, Japan
- Key people: Takashi Fujiya (MileStone Vietnam president)
- Number of employees: 16 (as of October 16, 2006)
- Subsidiaries: MileStone Vietnam Co., Ltd
- Website: Archived home page

MileStone Inc. (Note: In Japanese: (株式会社マイルストーン)) was a Japanese video game developer. The team was composed mostly of ex-Compile developers who left to form their own company. They were best known for shoot 'em up games developed for the Dreamcast and its arcade counterpart, the Sega NAOMI.

== History ==
The company had one subsidiary, MileStone Vietnam Co. Ltd., established on August 1, 2007 as an authorized game software developer by Nintendo of America.

In March 2013, Hiroshi Kimura, the president of MileStone, was arrested for violations of the Financial Instruments and Exchange Act for his activities while selling shares of a new company called MS Bio Energy. Both companies closed as a result.

== Games developed ==
=== Arcade Games ===
| Game | Year | Hardware | Publisher(s) |
|---|---|---|---|
| Chaos Field | 2004 | Sega NAOMI | MileStone |
| Radirgy | 2005 | Sega NAOMI | MileStone |
| Karous | 2006 | Sega NAOMI | MileStone |
| Illvelo | 2008 | Sega NAOMI | MileStone |
| Radirgy Noa | 2009 | Sega NAOMI | Lucky Co., Ltd |

=== Console Games ===
| Game | Year | System | Publisher(s) | JP | NA | EU |
|---|---|---|---|---|---|---|
| Chaos Field | 2004 | Sega Dreamcast | MileStone | Yes | No | No |
| Chaos Field | 2005 | GameCube | Sega (JP); O3 Entertainment (NA) | Yes | Yes | No |
| Chaos Field: New Order | 2005 | PlayStation 2 | MileStone | Yes | No | No |
| Radirgy | 2006 | Sega Dreamcast | MileStone | Yes | No | No |
| Radirgy Generic | 2006 | GameCube | MileStone | Yes | No ^{a} | No |
| Radirgy Precious | 2006 | PlayStation 2 | MileStone | Yes | No | No |
| Me de Unou wo Kitaeru: DS Sokudoku Jutsu | 2006 | Nintendo DS | MileStone | Yes | No | No |
| Tank Beat | 2006 (JP); 2007 (NA/EU) | Nintendo DS | MileStone (JP); O3 Entertainment (NA); Midas Interactive Entertainment (EU) | Yes | Yes | Yes |
| Me de Unou wo Kitaeru: Sokudoku Jutsu Portable | 2007 | PlayStation Portable | MileStone | Yes | No | No |
| Mimi de Unou o Kitaeru DS: Chou-Nouryoku | 2007 | Nintendo DS | MileStone | Yes | No | No |
| Me de Unou o Kitaeru: DS Sokudoku Junior | 2007 | Nintendo DS | MileStone | Yes | No | No |
| Itsu Demo Doko Demo: Onita Atsushi no Seiji Quiz DS | 2007 | Nintendo DS | MileStone | Yes | No | No |
| Heavy Armor Brigade | 2007 (JP); 2008 (NA) | Nintendo DS | MileStone (JP); UFO Interactive Games (NA) | Yes | Yes | No |
| Minna de Flash Anzan DS | 2008 | Nintendo DS | MileStone | Yes | No | No |
| Ultimate Shooting Collection ^{b} | 2008 | Nintendo Wii | MileStone (JP); UFO Interactive Games (NA) | Yes | Yes | No |
| Shokera Renai Otona no Tame no Metabo Dassutsu Training | 2008 | Nintendo DS | MileStone | Yes | No | No |
| Mokushise! Zenko Kutaikai!! Let's! Brass!! | 2008 | Nintendo DS | MileStone | Yes | No | No |
| Motto Me de Unou o Kitaeru DS: Sokudoku Jutsu | 2008 | Nintendo DS | MileStone | Yes | No | No |
| Hula Wii: Hula de Hajimeru - Bi to Kenkou! | 2008 | Nintendo Wii | MileStone | Yes | No | No |
| Arcade Shooter: Ilvelo | 2008 | Nintendo Wii | MileStone | Yes | No ^{a} | No |
| Po-Ka-Zu Wii | 2008 | Nintendo Wii | MileStone | Yes | No | No |
| Mind. Body. Soul.: Nutrition Matters ^{c} | 2009 | Nintendo DS | 505 Games | No | No | No |
| Hula Wii: Motto Jouzu no Fura o Odorou!! | 2009 | Nintendo Wii | MileStone | Yes | No | No |
| Radirgy Noa Wii | 2010 | Nintendo Wii | MileStone | Yes | No | No |
| Project Cerberus | 2010 | PlayStation Portable | Kaga Create | Yes | No | No |
| Twinkle Queen トウィンクル クイーン | 2010 | Nintendo Wii | MileStone | Yes | No | No |
| Radirgy Noa Massive | 2010 | Xbox 360 | MileStone | Yes | No | No |
| Milestone Shooting Collection 2 ^{b} | 2010 | Nintendo Wii | MileStone | Yes | No | No |
| Radirgy Noa Massive ^{d} | 2011 | Microsoft Windows | MileStone | Yes | No | No |
| Ryoume de Unou o Kitaeru: 3D Sokudoku Jutsu | 2011 | Nintendo 3DS | MileStone | Yes | No | No |
| Motto Me de Unou o Kitaeru Sokudoku Jutsu Light | 2011 | Nintendo DS | MileStone | Yes | No | No |

Notes

^a Originally scheduled for release in North America but ultimately canceled
^b Compilation
^c Originally scheduled for release in North America and Europe but ultimately canceled
^d Included as part of the Milestone Sound Collection package.
