= Chaos Field =

2005 video game

- Japanese arcade flyer
- Developer: MileStone Inc.
- Publisher: Able Corporation
- Director: Manabu Matsumoto
- Producer: Hiroshi Kimura
- Programmers: Jirō Hamaya; Manabu Matsumoto; Takahiro Kawachi
- Artist: Ryohei Murakami
- Composers: Kō Hayashi; Daisuke Nagata
- Platforms: Arcade, Dreamcast, GameCube, PlayStation 2
- Release: May 25, 2004: Arcade; JP: May 25, 2004 Dreamcast; JP: December 16, 2004 GameCube; JP: February 24, 2005; NA: December 20, 2005 PlayStation 2; JP: December 21, 2005
- Genre: Shoot 'em up
- Mode: Single-player
- Arcade system: Sega NAOMI

Chaos Field (Note: Japanese: カオスフィールド, Hepburn: Kaosu Fīrudo) is a 2004 vertically scrolling shooter arcade video game developed by MileStone. The game consists entirely of boss battles, featuring five stages with three bosses each. The player can choose to play as one of three characters, each with their own ship that has a unique primary weapon. The player can flip the environment at will between two parallel worlds.

Chaos Field is the first game from MileStone, a company founded by former Compile employees looking to develop high quality shooters similar to those Compile was known for in the past. The game experienced a troubled development cycle due to a lack of organization and the number of employees involved. After its release in Japanese arcades, it was ported to the Dreamcast, PlayStation 2, and GameCube in Japan. The GameCube version was also released in North America, and included a mode that adds small waves of enemies between the bosses. Critics found the game to be overwhelmingly average, a generic shooter lacking in polish and execution.

== Gameplay ==
The player battles a boss

Chaos Field is a vertically scrolling shoot 'em up with consecutive boss battles. The game features five stages, each with three bosses to defeat. The player can choose to play as one of three characters, each with their own ship that has a unique primary weapon: a spread shot, a lock-on laser, or bolts of lightning. Each ship is equipped with a short-range sword that can destroy bullets and inflict damage on enemy ships. Each player ship also has two special abilities, one being a type of homing weapon that locks onto enemies and the other being a deployable shield that absorbs bullets. The specifics of how these special abilities function differs slightly between ships.

The player can flip the environment at will between two parallel worlds, the "order field" and the "chaos field". Gameplay is normal in the order field, but in the chaos field, the player's weapons are more powerful, the special homing weapons can destroy enemy bullets, and enemies will fire more bullets. The player only gets one life per credit, but can take several hits before losing a life. The score can be increased via attack combos and time bonuses.

== Development and release ==
Chaos Field was the first game developed by MileStone Inc., who were desiring to make a shooter of their own. The company was founded by former Compile employees in 2003 after Compile went bankrupt. Most of the staff originally joined Compile because of the company's positive reputation with shooting games like the Aleste series, but were left unsatisfied from Compile's growing focus on other franchises like Puyo Puyo. The team decided to develop the game for Sega's NAOMI arcade platform since they were experienced with it and had a working relationship with Sega. Development was funded by their publisher Able Corporation and by subcontract work on other games. According to sound and art designer Daisuke Nagata, the game experienced a troubled development cycle due to a lack of organization and the number of employees involved. The team had a working prototype by September 2003 but scrapped this iteration and started anew when they determined it did not feel right. This version of the game had the player controlling a giant robot flying through stages set in real Japanese cities.

Chaos Field was first released in Japanese arcades on May 25, 2004. It received a Dreamcast port in December that year, after the console was already discontinued by Sega. The team also had experience with developing for the GameCube and PlayStation 2, and so created ports for those platforms as well. The GameCube version, Chaos Field Expanded, was released in February 2005 in Japan by Sega, with a North American version published by O~3 Entertainment in December that year. This version features an exclusive mode that adds small waves of enemies between the bosses. Also in December, the PlayStation 2 version titled Chaos Field New Order was released in Japan. Chaos Field is included in the Wii compilations Ultimate Shooting Collection (2009) and Milestone Shooting Collection 2 (2010).

== Reception ==
Reception

Aggregate score
| Aggregator | Score | |
| Aggregator | Dreamcast | GameCube |
|---|---|---|
| Metacritic | N/A | 63 / 100 |

Review scores
| Publication | Score | |
| Publication | Dreamcast | GameCube |
|---|---|---|
| Edge | 6 / 10 | N/A |
| Famitsu | 24 / 40 | 24 / 40 |
| GameSpot | N/A | 6.2 / 10 |
| GamesRadar+ | N/A | 3/5 |
| GamesTM | N/A | 6 / 10 |
| IGN | N/A | 6 / 10 |
| Nintendo Power | N/A | 6 / 10 |
| Nintendo World Report | N/A | 4.5 / 10 |

Critics found Chaos Field to be a generic shooter. IGN wrote that "the entire effort screams cookie-cutter design" but that it "manages to deliver an entertaining dose of gameplay within a completely average looking shooter." Gamezilla and GamesRadar also described the game as "standard". Several critics compared the game unfavorably to other shoot 'em ups since it is overly traditional and lacking in distinguishing qualities. In particular, some critics found the game inferior to Ikaruga, another arcade shooter ported to the GameCube. Some critics like IGN only recommended Chaos Field to hardcore fans of the genre who desired to attain the highest scores, and pointed casual players to Ikaruga.

Some journalists criticized the poor execution and lack of features. GamesRadar and GameSpot wrote that the collision detection did not feel right, with GameSpot saying the game "lacks the ultra precise action and feel that's crucial to any truly great shoot-'em-up." Nintendo World Report wrote that the game felt unbalanced and could have been improved with more effort by the developers. Along the same lines, Edge and GamesTM wrote that the game felt rushed and lacked polish. The graphics were criticized as generic and outdated, and the sound effects on the GameCube version were described as almost nonexistent. IGN described the audio and graphical presentation as "decent" without any exceptional qualities. GamesTM wrote that the game lacks the "refinement and accessibility" of other shooters. Some criticized the lack of a two-player mode and online ranking system.
