= Superhot =

2016 video game

- Developer: Superhot Team
- Publisher: Superhot Team
- Director: Piotr Iwanicki
- Producers: Marek Bączyński; Tom Kaczmarczyk
- Designers: Piotr Iwanicki; Panos Rriska
- Programmers: Krzysztof Tracz; Jakub Witczak
- Artists: Marcin Surma; Konrad Kaca
- Writer: Cezary Skorupka
- Composer: Karl Flodin
- Engine: Unity
- Platforms: Linux; Microsoft Windows; OS X; Xbox One; PlayStation 4; Oculus Quest; Stadia; Nintendo Switch
- Release: Windows, OS X, Linux; 25 February 2016; 5 December 2016 (VR); Xbox One; 3 May 2016; PlayStation 4; 21 July 2017; Oculus Quest; 30 April 2019; Nintendo Switch; 19 August 2019; Stadia; 1 June 2020
- Genre: First-person shooter
- Mode: Single-player

Superhot is a 2016 independent first-person shooter video game developed and published by Superhot Team. Though the game follows traditional first-person shooter gameplay mechanics, with the player attempting to take out enemy targets using guns and other weapons, time within the game progresses at normal speed only when the player moves; this creates the opportunity for the player to assess their situation in slow motion and respond appropriately, making the gameplay similar to strategy video games. The game is presented in a minimalist art style, with enemies in red and weapons in black, in contrast to the otherwise white and grey environment.

The game originated as an entry in the 2013 7 Day FPS Challenge, which Superhot Team expanded into a browser-based demonstration that September. Widespread attention from the demonstration prompted the team to develop the full game, using Kickstarter to secure funding to complete the title. Superhot was released for Linux, macOS, and Microsoft Windows in February 2016. Versions for the Xbox One, PlayStation 4, and Nintendo Switch were released in May 2016, July 2017, and August 2019, respectively. A rebuilt version of the game to better support virtual reality, Superhot VR, was released for the Oculus Rift, HTC Vive, and PlayStation VR headset devices. A sequel, Superhot: Mind Control Delete, which utilizes roguelike elements such as procedural generation and permadeath, was released in 2020.

The game was met with positive reception, with reviewers considering the title to be an innovative take on the first-person shooter genre.

== Gameplay ==
In Superhot, time moves slower when the player does not move. The game moves faster when they look around, move or shoot, giving them situational awareness to respond to enemy actions, such as altering their course to avoid the path of oncoming bullets. The game uses a limited palette of colors – whites, blacks, and reds – to aid the player in focusing on key elements.

Superhot sets the player in a minimalistic environment, taking out hostile attackers that are trying to kill them. Weapons picked up by the player have limited ammunition and break easily, requiring the player to rely on defeating enemies to attain new weapons, or making melee kills. Taking a single hit from an enemy bullet kills the player, requiring them to restart the level. Though the game mechanics are typical of most shooters, time only progresses normally when the player moves or fires a gun, otherwise time is slowed; this is described in the game's tagline, "Time Moves Only When You Move".

The game originally was a three-level prototype browser game. In expanding to the full game, Superhot Team created a campaign mode across approximately thirty-one levels, estimated to be as long as Portal. The full game includes additional weapons, such as new kinds of firearms, explosives, melee weapons, and improvised weapons like billiard balls that can be thrown at enemies, and introduces AI enemies that have similar awareness as the player and can dodge the player's bullets. One significant change from the earlier prototype is that the player does not automatically pick up a weapon when they pass over it but must enact a specific control to do so, enabling the player to selectively choose and use weapons, or grab weapons dropped by enemies. The full game enables the player to jump and as long as the jump button or key is held, the player can slow down time to plan and perform actions, enabling aerial gun combat.

In the last portion of the campaign, the player gains the ability to "hotswitch" into an enemy's body, wherein they take control over the target, with the previous body dying. The manoeuvre allows the player to escape projectiles they cannot dodge, but has a cooldown timer that prevents repeated use, and the new body also drops its weapons upon the player entering it.

In addition to the campaign mode, the full release of Superhot includes an "endless" mode, where the player survives as long as they can against an endless wave of enemies. A "challenge" mode allows players to replay the campaign mode levels but under specific restrictions or requirements, such as completing the level within a limited amount of time or only using a specific type of weapon. The final game includes a replay editor to allow users to prepare clips to share on social media websites.

=== Superhot VR ===
A new set of levels was developed for the virtual reality version of the game. The player's avatar reacts to the player's body, head, and hand movements. In keeping with the "time only moves when you move" concept, in-game time only progresses when the player makes deliberate movement with their body; turning their head to assess the situation, or making small twitches to the body do not cause time to progress. The player's avatar can only move in a small space from their location on the level (mapping to how the player moves around themselves); after defeating a small wave of enemies, they grab onto a virtual object to jump them to a new location within the level. Replacing the hotswitch ability is a "mindwave" allowing players to telepathically kill an enemy while unarmed. Following the campaign, the player unlocks a similar endless mode as the non-VR title.

=== Superhot: Mind Control Delete ===
The sequel retains the original time-manipulation mechanics, but wraps the game into a roguelite framing, as well as adding power-ups.

=== Superhot JP ===
A Japanese-themed Superhot title, Superhot JP, began development by GameTomo in 2018 with support of the Superhot developers. It is initially planned for a Japanese release for PlayStation 4 and Windows, but other regions and platforms may follow.

== Plot ==
Release date trailer

The Superhot narrative works in several metanarrative levels: the player plays a fictionalized version of themselves sitting in front of their DOS prompt, getting a message from their friend who offers them a supposedly leaked copy of a new game called superhot.exe, claiming that the only way to access it is with a crack. Launching the game immediately thrusts the player into a series of seemingly unconnected levels via different points of view, all based around killing hostiles, after which the game glitches out and disconnects. After this crash, the player's friend sends an updated version of the .exe file, apparently a new version of the game that fixes the "glitches".

As both the player and their friend play through superhot.exe, it becomes apparent that the player's presence in the game is monitored by whoever is responsible for the game – referring to itself as a "system" – and demands they cease playing via various methods, such as ominous threats showing the player's in-game residence, and altering the player's messages to their friend to urge them to stop playing, eventually harassing the player's friend into giving up on the game and engineering a fallout with them. As the player goes through more and more levels, each apparently targeting specific locales, the system's warnings grow more ominous, telling them the player is unaware of the consequences of their actions, eventually forcing the player to walk to their own in-game house and to their in-game player character, a figure wearing VR headgear, and punch themselves into unconsciousness. Upon doing so, the "game" glitches out, and the player character wakes with a severe head injury. Afterward, the system warns the player once again to stop using Superhot, and forces the player to quit the game entirely.

Inevitably, the player will start up Superhot again, and the system concedes to the player's insistence to keep playing, fully encouraging them to play more and more. Now under the system's sway, the player begins a rampage through city streets, cutting through enemies to get closer and closer to a massive laboratory that houses the system itself. There, it guides the player into uploading itself into the core as numerous enemies attempt to stop the player. Once done, the player becomes part of the core, joining numerous other minds absorbed by the core itself into a transhuman hivemind. The core forces the player to shoot their original body/player character, finally making them one with Superhot.

Post-credits, the core/hivemind informs the player that they are to spread interest in superhot.exe by recommending it to as many people through social media and Steam reviews, specifically instructing the player to use the words "Superhot is the most innovative shooter I've played in years!", the same words the player's friend used to recommend them the game.

== Development ==
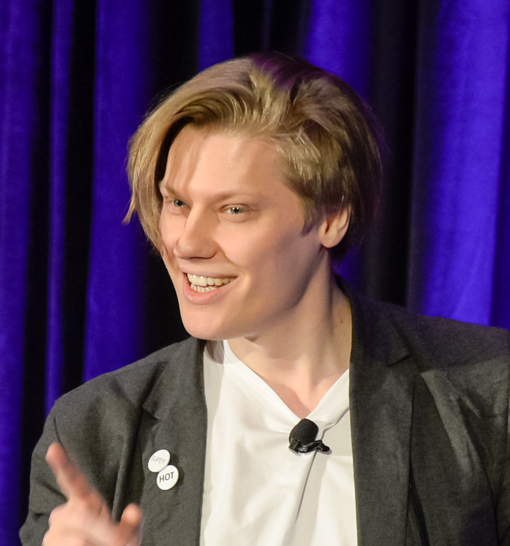
Game designer Piotr Iwanicki presents on Superhot's development at the 2016 Game Developers Conference.

Superhot was originally developed for the 2013 7 Day FPS Challenge, held that August, in which teams of programmers were given a week to develop complete, functional prototypes of games. Superhot's director Piotr Iwanicki stated that he was in part inspired by the Flash game "Time4Cat", in which the player controls a cat trying to collect food on a busy road intersection; time only moves when the player moves the cat. The team also took inspiration from the music video for the 2013 song "Bad Motherfucker" by the Russian band Biting Elbows, which shows a special agent from a first-person perspective escaping from a hostage situation through parkour and gunplay. They combined these ideas for their Challenge prototype. The name of the game is based on how the two words "super" and "hot" best represent the game being "positive" and "intense".

The Challenge prototype only featured three levels across three computers, which, to meet the deadline, the team strung together in three separate applications and called the game episodic. They then refined it and released it as a free browser game in September 2013, whereupon it received extensive attention from players. They also submitted the game through the Steam Greenlight process, and within five days, it was successfully approved for later distribution by Valve, making the game the fastest to be approved through Greenlight at the time. Iwanicki stated that the positive reaction to the web demonstration was a result of players looking for any variation in the standard formula of first-person shooters, which had not really changed since the development of Doom. Iwanicki commented that while some have called Superhot a puzzle game, he feels it is an action game. Unlike a puzzle game where there is typically only one solution and the player is rewarded for finding it, Iwanicki considers Superhot to be about having the time to adjust to one's instincts and improvise a strategy for completing a challenge.

In May 2014, the development team launched a Kickstarter campaign to make Superhot a full release, including improvement of the art design, new levels and challenges, and support for the Oculus Rift virtual reality headset. They had planned on starting a Kickstarter campaign to fund publication after their Steam Greenlight approval, but they first wanted to polish the game more before offering the crowdfunding opportunity. This included tuning some of the gameplay, such as adding a katana that could be used to cut oncoming bullets in half. When they tried to launch the Kickstarter campaign, they found that the platform did not support their native Poland at the time. This gave the team more time to improve the game while locality issues were resolved, and it allowed them to continue building the art assets for the Kickstarter promotion. The Kickstarter campaign met its fundraising goal within the first day of going live, allowing the Superhot team to identify additional stretch goals, including improved animations and replay mode. Luke Spierewka, a programmer on the team, believed the success of their fundraising was in part due to the availability of the browser-enabled demonstration that allowed potential funders to experience the game's concept hands-on. The campaign ended with more than $230,000 in pledged funding, allowing the team to add in New Game Plus mode. Cliff Bleszinski designed a level for the game because he pledged for the Kickstarter tier that allowed a backer to co-design an arena stage.

The art style of Superhot is minimalistic by design, according to art director Marcin Surma. It uses three principal colors: white for the environment, black for objects the player can interact with, and red for enemies. This choice was made during the creation of the demonstration, primarily to allow the team to focus on the gameplay aspects for the 7-day FPS Challenge. Surma, who had not been able to participate in the Challenge but was brought on after their decision to expand the game, maintained this style, as it made it clear to the player what they had to focus on, removing the common distractions found in first-person shooters. Iwanicki believed these design choices made any part of the game immediately "readable" to the player to plan out their strategy, while still providing enough detail to allow the player to imagine other facets of the game's world. Surma also brainstormed the idea of presenting the game in the style of works from MS-DOS and Amiga computer systems in the 1990s; this resulted in the metagame interface that was fashioned after the Norton Commander file manager. Surma thought this approach continued the game's theme of contrast: just as the enemies stand out in stark contrast to the environment, the 3D game stands out similarly from the character-based menu screens.

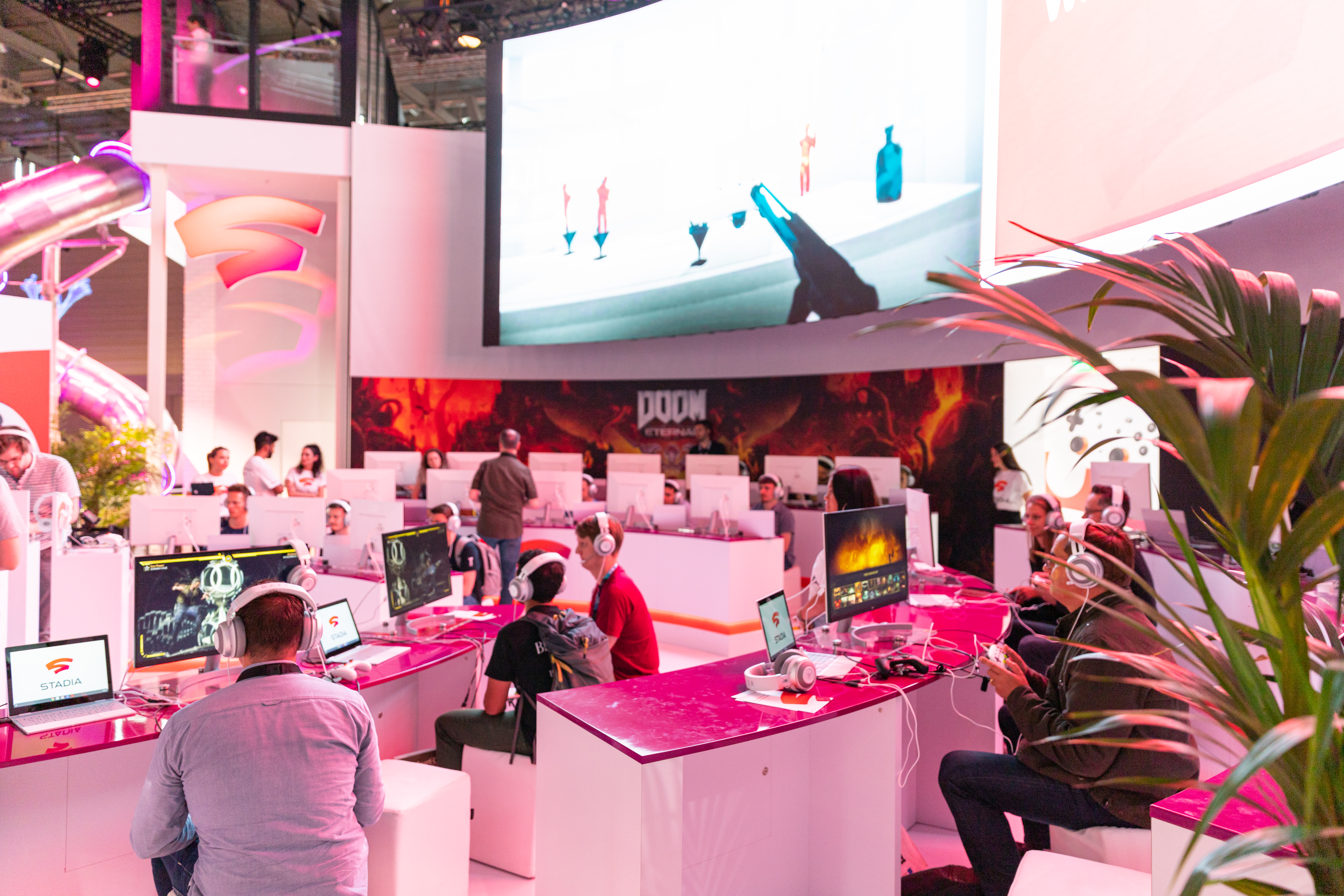
Superhot on display on a large video screen at a Stadia exhibit at Gamescom 2019

At Gamescom, Microsoft announced that Superhot would be available on Xbox One via ID@Xbox. Superhot was released on Microsoft Windows, OS X, and Linux on 25 February 2016, while the Xbox One version was released on 3 May 2016. Physical copies of the game are published and distributed by IMGN.PRO.

Free downloadable content in the form of new levels and a new gameplay feature was released for all versions in 2016.

With the critical success of the game by late 2016, the Superhot team started working on a version for the PlayStation 4. This was released on 21 July 2017. A Nintendo Switch version was released on 19 August 2019.

=== Superhot VR ===
An early prototype of the game using Oculus Rift virtual reality (VR) support was shown during the Electronic Entertainment Expo 2014. The Rift-enabled version included the added gameplay feature of allowing the player to lean the character to the side by leaning their bodies, and rotating the character's view separate from their body's motion. Many journalists that played this demonstration compared the experience to being like the characters of Neo or Morpheus from the film The Matrix, exemplifying the game's use of the Rift as innovative compared to other Rift-enabled games.

After completing the Kickstarter with sufficient funds for the VR-enabled version, the Superhot team realized that they needed to rebuild the game from scratch to provide the best VR experience for Superhot, named Superhot VR. Though they wanted to reuse some of the original levels, factors that they took into design for a normal first-person shooter, such as larger-than-normal hallways to avoid claustrophobia, did not translate well for VR, and it was easier to craft new levels for the VR experience. They also needed to find ways to simulate a player's hitbox, given that the Oculus can only track the player's head and hands. They used this to approximate the player's torso in game. The team worked to assure the gameplay was focused on the VR experience, including tighter integration of the game's story. Developer Tomasz Kaczmarczyk said that, compared to the standard version of the game, the VR-enabled one requires the player to act out all the motions to complete a game level, making the player "feel 100 percent engaged" in the experience. Oculus VR, the company manufacturing the Oculus Rift, helped to fund Superhot VR's development for the Rift in exchange for time-exclusivity. Superhot VR, which requires the Oculus Touch motion-sensing controllers, was released along the Touch devices on 5 December 2016. The Superhot team also developed a version for the HTC Vive, which was released on 25 May 2017. Similarly, support for a PlayStation VR version of Superhot VR was started alongside the PlayStation 4 port of the non-VR game, and was released after the VR release in July 2017.

Oculus VR itself came under criticism in April 2016 after the company decided to apply digital rights management controls on its software that required Oculus games to only be played on the Rift, effectively breaking a user-made patch, called "Revive", to allow these games to have been played on the HTC Vive. Oculus eventually reversed this decision in June 2016, removing the digital rights controls. However, users disappointed with the original limitations took similar issues with Superhot's Oculus Rift exclusivity, with several users giving the game negative reviews on Steam and other storefronts. Superhot's developers noted that without Oculus' help, the VR version of the game would not be as sophisticated as it came out to be, and restated their intentions to port the game to other VR systems.

As released, Superhot VR included an in-game toggle that would skip over scenes that involved the player-character committing self-harm, such as shooting themselves in the head or jumping off a tall building. In July 2021, Superhot Team released a patch that eliminated these scenes completely from the game, stating that, on reflection, "Considering [the] sensitive time we're living in, we can do better than that. You deserve better. All scenes alluding to self-harm are now completely removed from the game. These scenes have no place in superhot virtual reality." The choice to remove these games led to the game getting review bombed on Steam, with some users claiming that Superhot Team was giving in to "snowflakes" and others believing it to be a form of virtue signaling.

=== Card game ===
Superhot Team worked with Manuel Correia to produce a Superhot card game. The game was crowdfunded through a Kickstarter campaign that started in January 2017 and shipped to backers in late 2017/early 2018. It became available for retail purchase on 25 May 2018 after being picked up for publishing by Grey Fox Games.

The game uses a set of cards where most are dual-purpose cards, either treated as obstacles or as a move the player can make; for example a card representing a weapon would be representing an enemy shooting at the player as an obstacle, or a weapon the player has if as a move. Additionally, there are "bullet" cards that are only obstacles. The goal is to use cards in one's hand as moves, using their points to meet or exceed the cost value of the obstacles as to eliminate non-bullet cards from a tableau on the table; once all obstacle cards are eliminated, the player can then use moves to eliminate the bullets. The player can also opt to "gain" an obstacle card for their own deck, making the game have elements of a deck-building card game. If a player exhausts their hand before eliminating all the obstacle cards, any remaining bullets are counted against them, and after four bullets marks, the game is over. There are also additional goal cards that the player must complete during this process. The game has variants for single-player, co-operative and competitive multiplayer games.

== Reception ==
Reception

Aggregate score
Aggregator	Score
Metacritic	NS: 84/100; PC: 82/100; PS4: 83/100; XONE: 83/100

Review scores
Publication	Score
Game Informer	7.75/10
GameSpot	8/10
IGN	7.5/10
PC Gamer (US)	84/100
Polygon	9/10
VideoGamer.com	9/10

Edit on Wikidata

The web demonstration proved popular, drawing attention to the game and aiding in the success of its Kickstarter. The game has been compared thematically to The Matrix film franchise and the Max Payne video game series, and with environments described by Wired UK's Philippa Warr as playing "through Quentin Tarantino's version of the Mad Men opening credits". The "time moves only when you do" mechanic, as described by its creators, has been called the "Braid of first-person shooters", in which the time mechanic makes the shooter more like a strategy game than a shooter.

On its full release, Superhot received "generally favorable" reviews, according to review aggregator Metacritic. Kyle Orland of Ars Technica believed the game had a "short but sweet running time" for its campaign mode with plenty of additional playtime available through the challenge and endless game modes to keep the game interesting. Eurogamer's Christian Donlan considered both the gameplay and the narrative around it working well together to form "that rare piece of charmingly curated violence that dares to provoke difficult thought". Chris Plante of The Verge found that while the narrative was passable, the gameplay and design choices that drive the title away from being a simple first-person shooter, such as the inclusion of a red trail to show the path of bullets that subtly allow the player to identify their source, made Superhot "something wholly original in a genre that has become bereft of originality". Christopher Byrd for the Washington Post called the game a "soulful, artistic shooter", using its metafiction to "[flaunt] its understanding of the discourse around video games".

Landfall Games, the developers of Clustertruck which requires the player to jump and leap between numerous trucks in motion, created a short playable modification of their game for April Fools' Day in 2016 called Super Truck, combining their game's concept with Superhot's time-motion mechanic and art style.

=== Accolades ===
Superhot was listed as an honorable mention for the Nuovo Award for the 2014 Independent Games Festival Awards, while its full release was nominated for the 2016 Seumus McNally Grand Prize and for Excellence in Design awards. Superhot was nominated for Trending Game of the Year, Most Promising Intellectual Property, and Most Fulfilling Community-Funded Game of the Year for the 2017 SXSW Gaming Awards. During the 20th Annual D.I.C.E. Awards, the Academy of Interactive Arts & Sciences acknowledged Superhot's achievements in independent game design by nominating it for the "D.I.C.E. Sprite Award".

Superhot VR was nominated for "Best VR Game" at the Golden Joystick Awards, and for "Best VR/AR Game" at The Game Awards 2017. At IGN's Best of 2017 Awards, it won the award for "Best VR Experience", whereas its other nominations were for "Best Shooter" and "Most Innovative". It was also nominated for "VR Game of the Year" at the 2018 SXSW Gaming Awards, and won the awards for "Gamer's Voice (Virtual Reality Game)" at the SXSW Gaming Gamer's Voice Awards, and for "Best VR/AR Game" at the 18th Annual Game Developers Choice Awards. During the 20th Annual D.I.C.E. Awards, the Academy of Interactive Arts & Sciences awarded Superhot VR with "Immersive Reality Game of the Year", along with a nomination for "Immersive Reality Technical Achievement".

=== Sales ===
According to analyst firm Superdata, in 2017, Superhot VR was the top revenue-grossing VR game for personal computers and 3rd highest for consoles, bringing in US$2.56 million and US$1.06 million in revenues, respectively.

In April 2019, the Superhot Team reported that sales of Superhot VR had surpassed 800,000 units, exceeding sales of the original Superhot game. Within the last two weeks of 2019, Superhot VR brought in more than US$2 million of revenue across all VR platforms.

== Legacy ==
The success of Superhot allowed the Superhot Team to establish a "Superhot Presents" funding system for other small indie games, looking for more quirky titles that need financial assistance. At its launch in August 2019, the Superhot Presents fund was already supporting the Frog Detective series by Worm Club, and Knuckle Sandwich by Andrew Brophy.
